= Virginia Carter =

Canadian physicist and business executive (1936–2024)

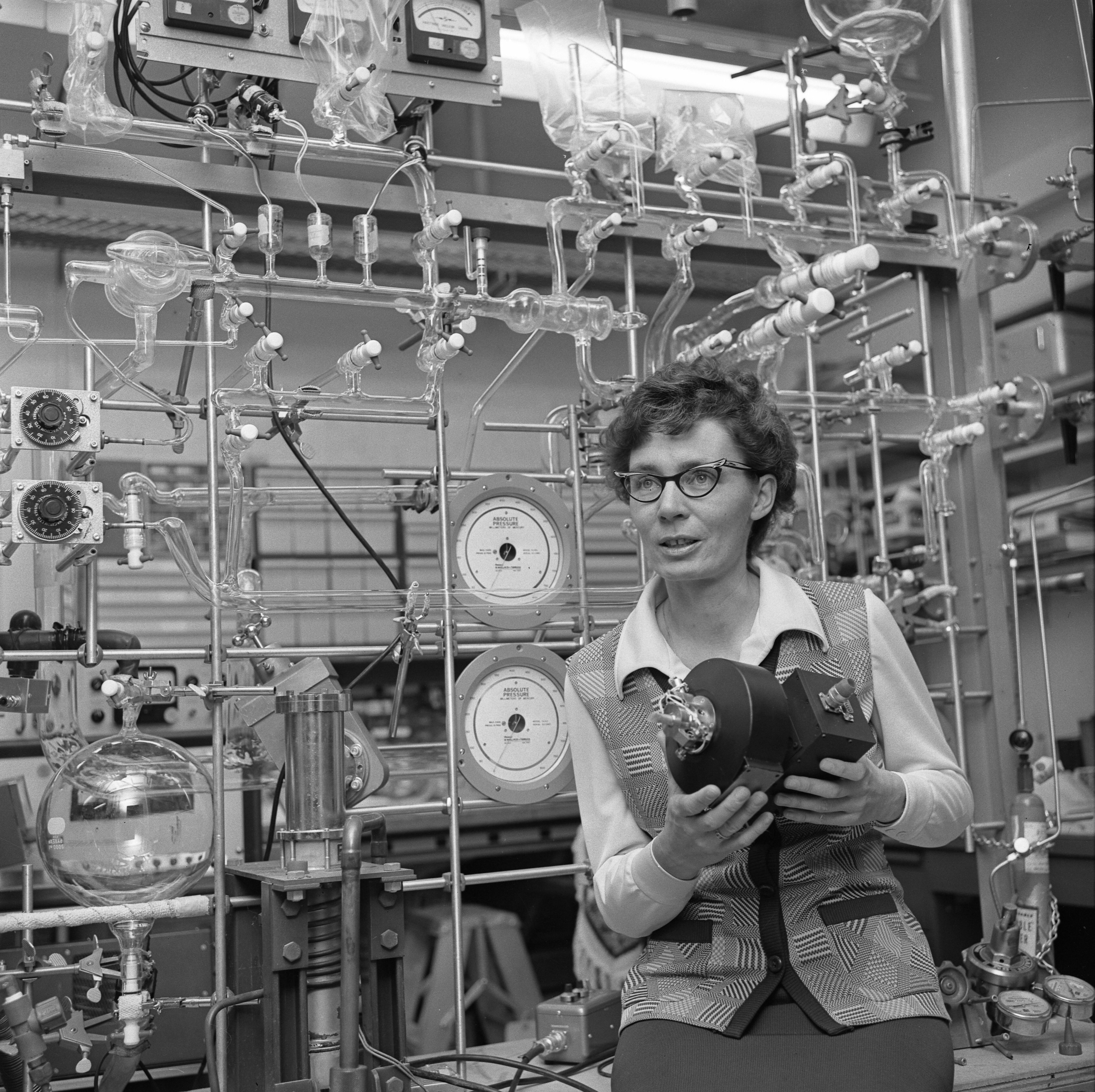
- Virginia Carter in her lab at Aerospace Corp. in Calif., 1972
- Born: 18 November 1936; Arvida, Quebec, Canada
- Died: 17 October 2024 (aged 87); Redondo Beach, California, U.S.
- Education: McGill University (BSc, 1958); University of Southern California (MA)
- Occupations: Physicist; entertainment executive
- Years active: 1962–2002
- Employer(s): Douglas Aircraft Corporation; The Aerospace Corporation; Embassy Television; Tandem Productions; J.O. Crystal
- Known for: Research in vacuum ultraviolet spectroscopy; executive at Embassy Television; executive producer of The Wave
- Awards: Peabody Award; Emmy Award

Virginia Carter (18 November 1936 – 17 October 2024) was a Canadian-born physicist and entertainment executive.

== Life and career ==
Carter was born in Arvida, Quebec on 18 November 1936. She studied math and physics at McGill University and graduated magna cum laude in 1958. She then earned a master's degree from the University of Southern California. She was hired by the Douglas Aircraft Corporation in 1962. She then went to work for The Aerospace Corporation, where she was their sole female physicist. She stayed with Aerospace Corp. for nine years, conducting research on vacuum ultraviolet spectroscopy and high atmospheric conditions.

Carter was a spokesperson for the women's movement in the early 1970s and was president of the National Organization for Women's Los Angeles chapter. She stepped down from the position after she was diagnosed with breast cancer. She also advocated for passage of the Equal Rights Amendment.

Carter met Frances Lear through their common activism in the feminist movement. She introduced Carter to her husband, television producer Norman Lear. Starting in 1973, she became director of creative affairs for him at Tandem Productions. She worked on the sitcoms Maude and All in the Family. In 1976 she was promoted to vice president for creative affairs. Carter, a lesbian, frequently served as a liaison between Lear and gay rights activists who were concerned over material in his shows, such as his depiction of a same-sex couple in Hot l Baltimore.

Carter started a film division at Tandem and was the executive producer for the 1981 film The Wave. The film, based on The Third Wave experiment, won Peabody and Emmy Awards.

After Tandem was sold to Coca-Cola in the 1980s, Carter became president of J.O. Crystal, a firm that manufactures synthetic rubies. She retired from management of the firm in 2002. She also worked with the Population Media Center.

Carter died in Redondo Beach, California on 17 October 2024, at the age of 87.
