= John Dawkins (disambiguation) =

John Dawkins (born 1947) is an Australian former politician.

John or Johnny Dawkins may also refer to:

- John Dawkins (South Australian politician) (born 1954), South Australian politician
- Johnny Dawkins (born 1963), American basketball coach and former player
- Johnny Dawkins, screenwriter of 1981 film The Wave
