= Help! I'm Trapped in My Teacher's Body =

1993 novel by Morton Rhue

Help! I'm Trapped in my Teacher's Body!
- Scholastic edition
- Author: Todd Strasser
- Genre: Fiction
- Publisher: Scholastic Press
- Publication date: 1993
- Media type: Print (paperback)
- ISBN: 0-590-67292-4
- Followed by: Help! I'm Trapped in the First Day of School!

Help! I'm Trapped in My Teacher's Body! is a light-hearted children's science fiction novel by Todd Strasser, first published in 1993. It is the first book in his Help! I'm Trapped... series, many of which have a similar body swap premise.

== Plot summary ==
Jake Sherman is sitting in his sixth grade science class with his friends Josh Hopka and Andy Kent. The class is taught by the boring teacher Mr. Dirksen, who does nothing but lecture the students, and never does anything fun. As he lectures them, Jake and his friends load spitball shooters and shoot them at Mr. Dirksen. Andy and Josh manage to hide their shooters, but Jake is caught by Mr. Dirksen.

After class, Mr. Dirksen talks with Jake. He informs him that he is not going to be given detention, since Mr. Dirksen does not believe it will do any good. He says instead that Jake will, as punishment, carry a heavy box home for him.

After school, Mr. Dirksen and Jake walk home to Mr. Dirksen's house. As they reach it, a storm begins to come in. Mr. Dirksen shows Jake an invention that he is building in his garage. He calls it the Dirksen Intelligence Transfer System, and hopes that it will one day gain the ability to transfer intelligence from one being to another, thus eliminating the need for education or training. As he finishes explaining his invention, a bolt of lightning strikes the house, knocking Jake and Mr. Dirksen unconscious.

Jake wakes up and notices things are very different. He suddenly has an aching back and things look fuzzy. He looks across the garage to see himself looking back at him. The truth suddenly hits him: Mr. Dirksen's machine has caused Jake and his teacher to swap bodies. Mr. Dirksen (in Jake's body) informs Jake that he refuses to leave his student's body, and heads home to Jake's house. Jake (in Mr. Dirksen's body) follows, but is only thrown out of his house when his father does not recognize him and threatens to call the police.

The following day, Jake takes over teaching his science class. He suddenly realizes that, being in Mr. Dirksen's body, he can make the class fun. During the lesson, he teaches the students how to build bombs, much to their excitement, while Jake (Mr. Dirksen) has to write "I will not ask stupid questions in class" 100 times on the chalkboard instead of making the bombs.

While trapped in his teacher's body, Jake attempts to make life miserable for Mr. Dirksen in hopes that he will agree to switch back, but to no avail. Eventually, "Mr. Dirksen's" lessons to his science class prove so exciting that the impressed Principal Blanco praises him for them and declares him a model teacher. To celebrate this, Jake's other teacher, Mrs. Rogers, takes him out to breakfast, where she begins to fall in love with Jake in Mr. Dirksen's body and proposes marriage to him. She invites him to have a romantic dinner at her house where he can discuss the matter.

Jake eventually is able to convince his sister Jessica of his predicament and gets her to help him, but none of her efforts to make the intruder miserable prove effective. Mr. Dirksen, however, learns of a fact that makes him decide to switch back: that if he is Jake, he will have to spend the weekend in a cabin with Andy and Josh.

Jake, Mr. Dirksen, and Jessica head to Mr. Dirksen's home. Mr. Dirksen points out that if there is no bolt of lightning to strike his home, there is no hope of the machine working. Jake attempts to fly a kite up to the power line and run the rope down to the machine, but the kite crashes. Jake then gets the idea to use a baseball instead. He and his sister are not able to do it, so he leaves it up to Mr. Dirksen, who makes Jake promise that if he switches back, Jake will be a model student. Jake agrees, so Mr. Dirksen throws the ball. It succeeds in wrapping around the line. The trio hurry to the garage and attach the line to the machine.

Soon, another lightning bolt strikes the house, knocking Jake and his teacher unconscious. When they wake, they are back in their bodies. Mr. Dirksen agrees to make his classes more exciting from then on and heads to his dinner date with Mrs. Rogers.

In an epilogue, Jake talks with Mrs. Rogers, who reveals that she and Mr. Dirksen are engaged.
