= Nightmare Inn =

Novel series by Todd Strasser

- Author: Todd Strasser (as T. S. Rue)
- Country: United States
- Language: English
- Genre: Young adult horror
- Publisher: HarperPrism
- No. of books: ([[: 1. Nightmare Inn; 2. Room 13; 3. The Pool; 4. The Attic; |List of books]])

Nightmare Inn is a series of young adult horror novels by Todd Strasser, who penned the books using the pseudonym T. S. Rue. It is a brief series that contains only four installments, all of them published in 1993: Nightmare Inn, Room 13, The Pool, and The Attic. The books were distributed by HarperPrism, who released them in both paperback and hardcover editions.

The books were published in the same time period in which R.L. Stine was enjoying phenomenal success with his highly popular Fear Street novels, but Strasser's saga was short-lived; whether this was the intention of the author or the result of poor sales is unknown, but the entire series has been out of print for many years.

HarperCollins included the books in its Nightmares series, a group of novels that have no relation to each other besides their themes of horror. Nightmare Inn, The Pool and The Attic were published in an anthology called Nightmare Inn: Three Books In One.

== Plot overview ==
All the books of the series are set at the same location, the New Arcadia Inn, formerly known as the Arcadia Inn. The resort is luxurious and located in a forest in the northeastern part of the United States. It has a gruesome history of murder and violence from beyond the grave. All the primary characters are teenagers, which is a common format of the young adult novels. Though each book is a stand-alone story, they are all inter-connected by two recurring characters, a young girl named Sarah (who plays an important part in the first novel and is portrayed as a secondary character in subsequent stories) and the inn's caretaker/manager, who is intimately familiar with the hotel's history.
