= Anca Miruna Lăzărescu =

German-Romanian film director (born 1979)

Anca Miruna Lăzărescu (born 1979 in Timișoara) is a German-Romanian film director. For her film work, she has received a nomination for the European Film Award. She directed the international drama series Hackerville (2018) for HBO and TNT Serie as well as the German Netflix series We Are the Wave (2019) and the third season of the Amazon Prime series Hanna.

== Life and career ==
Anca Miruna Lăzărescu studied film directing at the University of Television and Film Munich. During her studies, she directed fictional short films, documentaries and commercials. Meanwhile, she also participated in international script workshops.

For her documentary film The Secret of Deva (2007), she received the prize for best German film at the Sehsuechte International Student Film Festival in Potsdam.

In 2011, she graduated from the Munich film school. Her graduation film Silent River celebrated its world premiere at the Berlin International Film Festival in 2011 and was nominated as best short film for the European Film Award in 2011. The movie screened at over 300 festivals worldwide and won 82 international awards.

Lăzărescus feature-length debut film That Trip We Took With Dad, a historical road movie set in 1968, had its international premiere at the Moscow International Film Festival and its German premiere at the Munich Film Festival in 2016. At the latter, the film received the special prize of the section German Cinema New Talent Award. It won the Bavarian Film Award as the best newcomer production of 2017. Lăzărescu was nominated as best up-and-coming director for the German Film Director Award Metropolis.

Lăzărescu's next feature film, Happiness Sucks, opened the Hof International Film Festival in 2018 and was nominated at the German Film Awards in 2019. On the occasion of the movie's premiere in Hof, German newspaper Die Welt described Lăzărescu as the "great hope of German cinema".

In 2018, Lăzărescu directed the mini-series Hackerville for HBO and TNT, which was awarded the Grimme Award in 2019.

In 2019, Lăzărescu was the lead director for the controversial series We Are the Wave. The Netflix original show, produced by Christian Becker and Dennis Gansel, had its premiere in November 2019, streaming in 190 countries. Again, Lăzărescu was nominated for the Grimme Award. The New York Times included We Are the Wave in its monthly "Best Movies and TV Shows New on Netflix" list.

In 2019, Lăzărescu became jury president of the International Festival of Film Schools Munich, the young talents' edition of the Munich Film Festival. She also teaches as a lecturer at the University of Television and Film Munich.

At the beginning of 2020, Lăzărescu was named one of the "eight emerging German filmmakers to watch in 2020" by Screen International. The same year, Der Spiegel wrote that since We Are The Wave, Lăzărescu has been considered "a candidate for great international material."

In 2021, her new TV movie starring Joachim Król and Martina Gedeck was announced to premiere at the Munich Film Festival.

The same year Lăzărescu directed the third-season finale of the Amazon Prime action drama series Hanna.

She contributed in directing all six episodes of the Swiss-German series Davos 1917, which was be released Christmas 2023.

Lazarescu lead-directed the first Romanian Netflix original Subteran in 2023. The production re-united her with the well-known Romanian actress Ana Ularu, the lead actress of Lazarescu´s short film debut Bucuresti-Berlin (2005).

In October 2026, Lăzărescu presented Carpe Diem at the Hof International Film Festival, marking the first AI-generated film in the event´s history.

Lăzărescu is a member of the German, Romanian and European Film Academy.

== Filmography ==
=== Documentary film ===
- D!ve (2004)
- Fremde Kinder (2005) (TV movie)
- The Secret of Deva (2007)
- One Day Today Will Be Once (2009) (Short film)

=== Short film ===
- Bucuresti-Berlin (2005)
- Silent River (2011)
- Carpe Diem (2026)

=== Feature film ===
- Breathless: Dominance of the Moment (2009)
- That Trip We Took With Dad (2016)
- Glück ist was für Weicheier (2018)
- Endlich Witwer – Forever Young (2021)

=== Television ===
- Hackerville (2018)
- We Are the Wave (2019)
- Hanna (2021)
- Herzogpark (2022)
- Davos 1917 (2023)
- Subteran (2023)
