= Help! I'm Trapped... =

Series of 17 children's books

Help! I'm Trapped... is a series of 17 books written by Todd Strasser, published by Scholastic Press. With worldwide sales of over 10 million copies, the plots mainly center around a group of children and a machine that has the power to switch bodies.

The first of the series, Help! I'm Trapped in My Teacher's Body, was published in 1993.

== Characters ==
- Jake Sherman is the protagonist of the series, who constantly switches bodies due to accidents or pure selfishness. Although lacking good integrity, he is shown to make the right choices when necessary.
- Josh Hopka is one of Jake's best friends. Mischievous and facetious, he always sticks by Jake's side.
- Andy Kent is Jake's other best friend and he is shown to be bit scatterbrained. Like Josh, he hangs out with Jake whenever necessary.
- Jessica Sherman is Jake's older sister, who is against using the DITS, and tries to help Jake whenever he is in trouble.

== Books ==
#	Title	Original published date	ISBN
01	Help! I'm Trapped in My Teacher's Body	September 1993	0-590-67292-4
When twelve-year-old Jake discovers that he and the dorkiest teacher in school, Mr. Dirksen, have switched bodies, he enlists the aid of his skeptical sister, Jessica, to help him set things right.
02	Help! I'm Trapped in the First Day of School	September 19, 1994	0-590-48647-0
Plotting plenty of tricks for the new school year, Jake Sherman thinks he will rule the eighth grade, until he discovers that he has to relive the first day over and over again, and makes each day zanier than the last.
03	Help! I'm Trapped in Obedience School	September 1995	0-590-97514-5
When Jake Sherman shows off a really weird machine to his pals, it accidentally goes off, turning his best friend into man's best friend: the Sherman family dog.
04	Help! I'm Trapped in My Gym Teacher's Body	January 1996	0-590-67987-2
A freak accident causes Jake Sherman to switch bodies with Mr. Braun, the muscle-bound gym teacher, and Jake is challenged to find a way out of his bizarre dilemma.
05	Help! I'm Trapped in the President's Body	1996	0-590-92166-5
When the president of the United States visits Jake Sherman's school, a crazy mistake involving a body switching machine turns Jake into a very reluctant commander-in-chief.
06	Help! I'm Trapped in My Sister's Body	January 1997	0-590-92166-5
With his on-line pal Sumi coming for a visit, Jake Sherman, worried because he has led her to believe that he is a star athlete, exchanges bodies with the only athlete in the family, his sister, Jessica.
07	Help! I'm Trapped in the First Day of Summer Camp	May 1997	0-590-02965-7
Jake Sherman's terrible first day at summer camp gets even worse when he discovers that he is doomed to live through it again and again.
08	Help! I'm Trapped in Obedience School Again!	September 1997	0-590-12996-1
When he switches bodies with his sister's dog, Lance, Jake roots through the garbage, devours dog food, and has to put up with the affections of a little dog named Foo-Foo.
09	Help! I'm Trapped in Santa's Body!	November 1997	0-613-07952-3
When Jake Sherman finds Santa Claus in his backyard, Santa, tired of the demands, the schedules, and the weather at the North Pole, hands Jake an envelope, and suddenly Jake finds himself in a red suit at the mall being swarmed by small children and babies.
10	Help! I'm Trapped in an Alien's Body!	March 1998	0-590-03215-1
Jake Sherman has switched bodies again, this time with a funny-looking alien, who is from a planet where aliens sit around and watch TV and eat junk food all day long. This sounds good to Jake but the alien has run off with Jake's body.
12	Help! I'm Trapped in My Principal's Body	September 1998	0-590-12072-7
A bully is beating up students in Jake Sherman's eighth grade class and it looks as if no one can stop him, until Jake causes his buddy Josh to switch bodies with the principal.
13	Help! I'm Trapped in a Movie Star's Body	October 1998	0-590-97803-9
When a cool movie star comes to Jeffersonville to shoot a film, he jumps at the chance to change places with Jake and live like a normal kid for awhile. Soon Jake is riding around in a limo, signing autographs, and being a good actor, but then gets into trouble.
14	Help! I'm Trapped in My Lunch Lady's Body	March 1999	0-590-97805-5
Burp It Up middle school has some brand-new Vend-A-Lunch machines. They might put the lunch ladies out of business, but that does not bother Jake Sherman and his best friends, until they switch bodies with three lunch ladies by mistake.
11	Help! I'm Trapped in My Camp Counselor's Body!	July 1, 1999	0-590-03272-0
Jake Sherman is in trouble again. This time he has made a huge mistake concerning summer sleepaway camp. His best friends Andy and Josh want to kill him and now it is up to Jake to get them out of this mess especially after finding out that his back-to-nature counselor is not who he seems.
15	Help! I'm Trapped in a Professional Wrestler's Body	February 2000	0-613-21693-8
When Jake and his friends land ringside seats for Wrestle Insanity, Andy foolishly switches bodies with Brainiac Bloom just before the match begins, and it is up to Jake to save him from Neutron Newman, the Human Bomb.
16	Help! I'm Trapped in a Vampire's Body	October 1, 2000	0-439-21034-8
At first it seems that there will be no bad effects when the intelligence transfer equipment malfunctions near Vlad, the night-shift custodian, until the night of Jake's Halloween party, when Jake finds himself slowly turning into a vampire.
17	Help! I'm Trapped in a Supermodel's Body	February 2001	0-439-21035-6
By winning a contest, Jake Sherman lands a job as supermodel Lanny Shanks' personal assistant, but when Jake accidentally activates the DITS, he must ward off the advances of Principal Blanco.
