= Craig Haney =

American social psychologist

Craig Haney is an American social psychologist and a professor at the University of California, Santa Cruz, noted for his work on the study of capital punishment and the psychological impact of imprisonment and prison isolation since the 1970s. He was a researcher on The Stanford Prison Experiment.

== Education ==
Haney obtained his B.A from the University of Pennsylvania and his M.A., Ph.D. in Psychology and J.D. from Stanford Law School.

== Career ==
In 1971, while at Stanford, Haney collaborated with Philip Zimbardo in conducting what is known today as The Stanford Prison Experiment, for which Haney served as a principal researcher. This experience help to set in course Haney's subsequent career and work with prison systems. It ingrained in Haney that “context matters, prisoners are people, mistreatment has consequences”, and perpetuated his passion about the psychological impact of incarceration, and his advocacy for humanization and reform.

Haney is a Distinguished Professor of Psychology and the UCSC Presidential Chair (for a three-year term which runs from 2015 until 2018) at the University of California Santa Cruz where he has been a member the faculty for some 39 years. He was selected as the university's Distinguished Faculty Research Lecturer in 2014. He has taught Psychology and Law I & II, Social Justice, Society, and Policy, and Graduate Research Methods, and The Social Context. His work with graduate students involves applied research on criminal justice topics including: the effects of imprisonment, criminogenic social histories, the effects of death qualification, and the impact of pretrial publicity on legal decision making. Teaching awards include, in 2015, his second Excellence in Teaching award bestowed by the UC Santa Cruz faculty senate.

== Publications ==
Haney has published five books, numerous research articles, and entries in law reviews, including:

- Death By Design: Capital Punishment as a Social Psychological System (Oxford University Press, 2005), which received the Herbert Jacobs Prize from the Law and Society Association as “the most outstanding book on law and society” published that year.
- Reforming Punishment: Psychological Limits to the Pains of Imprisonment (American Psychological Association, 2006), which was nominated for a National Book Award.
- The Growth of Incarceration in the United States: Exploring the Causes and Consequences (National Academies Press, 2014), for which he was a co-author along with other members of the National Academies charged with studying the causes and consequences of high rates of incarceration in the United States.
- Prisons Worldwide (Praeger Publishers, 2016), three volumes co-authored with Lynne Haney.
- Criminality in Context: The Psychological Foundations of Criminal Justice Reform (American Psychological Association, 2020).

Haney has also written for the Huffington Post.

== Testimony and media ==
Haney has served as an expert witness in several influential United States Federal Court cases related to the prison environment and punishment, including: Toussaint v. McCarthy (1984), Madrid v. Gomez (1995), Coleman v. Brown (1995), and Ruiz v. Johnson (1999). Moreover, Haney's work was influential in the United States Supreme Court 5–4 ruling of Brown v. Plata (2011), which upheld a lower court ruling that the California prison population be reduced. Commenting on this last case, Haney stated: "When prisons are unduly painful, they become harmful and the system begins to break down and fail." He noted further, "Prisoners can carry the consequences of that harm back out into the free world once they're released. I was very gratified to see the Supreme Court embrace that concept”.

In 2012, Haney testified before the Subcommittee on the Constitution, Civil Rights and Human Rights of the U.S. Senate Committee on the Judiciary at a hearing on “Reassessing Solitary Confinement”.

In 2014, he spoke on the National Public Radio program, Fresh Air with Terry Gross, about the impacts of solitary confinement.

In 2018, Haney was interviewed by Oprah Winfrey on a 60 Minutes segment that addressed the psychological consequences of long-term isolation.
