= Give a Boy a Gun =

2000 novel by Todd Strasser

- Cover of first edition
- Author: Todd Strasser
- Language: English
- Publisher: Simon & Schuster Children's Publishing
- Publication date: September 1, 2000
- Publication place: United States
- Media type: Print
- Pages: 208
- ISBN: 978-0689811128

Give a Boy a Gun is an epistolary novel for young adults by Todd Strasser, first published in 2000. The novel describes the events and social circumstances that lead up to, and form the aftermath of, a fictional school shooting. The story is presented in the form of segments of transcribed post-incident interviews with students, parents, teachers, and community members, compiled by Denise Shipley, a journalism student who is the stepsister of one of the shooters. The interviews provide a variety of viewpoints on the incident – some sympathetic, others hostile. Interspersed through the book are footnotes providing statistical information about guns and gun violence.

The plot has some similarities to the real-life Columbine High School massacre of April 20, 1999, although Strasser began research on the book before the Columbine shooting. The book was the first book relating to school shootings published after Columbine.

== Summary ==
Brendan Lawlor and Gary Searle are students at Middletown High School. Gary has lived in town since second grade, while Brendan is a new arrival. The two quickly become friends. They are subjected to verbal and physical bullying by football players at Middletown, which teachers and parents fail to notice, downplay, or outright ignore.

As time passes, both boys become darker and angrier, experimenting with explosives and withdrawing from most social activities. Eventually the boys begin to obsess over the possibility of acting on their violent impulses. Gary experiments with developing a powerful homemade bomb. Gary and Brendan steal semi-automatic guns from a neighbour. Meanwhile, students are excited about an upcoming dance to be held in the school's gym.

On the night of the dance, Brendan leaves a cryptic message for his friend Emily, warning her not to attend because there will be trouble. Masked, Brendan and Gary enter the gym just after the dance begins. They shoot out the lights before restraining the attendees with cable ties. Gary booby-traps the doors with bombs so they will explode if anyone tries to open them.

The pair approach the football team's quarterback, Sam, who has been one of their main tormentors. After some debate, they decide to shoot out his kneecaps so he will be unable to play football ever again. Gary and Brendan fire their guns randomly around the gym, scaring students and injuring others. Another football player, Dustin, manages to get free and unties some others. After Gary's on-and-off girlfriend Allison shows up, Gary commits suicide while Brendan is beaten into a coma by some of the students freed by Dustin. Brendan suffers irreversible brain damage from the beating and those responsible are arrested and put on trial for attempted murder.

The book ends with Denise Shipley, Gary's stepsister, wondering if Gary knew if there were other options besides violence. She swears she will always treat others with respect and teach others to do the same. She also shares her belief that semi-automatic weapons should be outlawed and handguns should be only in the hands of law enforcement.

== Characters ==
- Gary Searle – one of the shooters, highly intelligent for his age, screen-name "Dayzd"
- Brendan Lawlor – the other shooter, and leader, screen-name "Terminx"
- Ryan Clancy – a friend of both Gary's and Brendan's, screen-name "Rebooto"
- Allison Findley – Gary's on-and-off girlfriend and Brendan's friend, screen-name "Blkchokr"
- Cynthia Searle – Gary's mother
- Emily Kirsch – a former friend of Brendan's
- Brett Betzig – a friend of Brendan's from Springfield
- Julie Shore – a friend of Brendan's from Springfield
- Beth Bender – Middletown High School counselor
- Paul Burns – a football player at Middletown High School
- Sam Flach – a football player at Middletown High School
- Deidre Bunson – a "popular" girl at Middletown High School
- Ruth Hollington – Gary's fourth-grade teacher at Middletown Elementary School
- Stuart McEvoy – Gary's sixth-grade teacher at Middletown Middle School
- Katherine Sullivan – Brendan's sixth-grade teacher at Springfield Middle School
- Kit Conner – a neighbor of the Lawlors' in Springfield
- Dick Flanagan – Brendan's ninth-grade English teacher at Middletown High School
- F. Douglas Ellin – a biology teacher at Middletown High School
- Julia Reingold - Brendan's teacher from Middletown middle school
- Allen Curry – principal of Middletown High School
- Jack Phillips – a neighbor of Brendan's
- Chelsea Baker – a new girl (exchange student)
- Dustin Williams – a neighbor of Brendan's and football player
- Denise Shipley – Gary‘s older stepsister
