= Ron Jones (teacher) =

American writer and pedagogist (born 1941)

- Born: 1941 (age 84–85)
- Education: Stanford University
- Occupations: Educator, writer
- Website: ronjoneswriter.com

Ron Jones (born 1941) is an American writer, pedagogist, and former teacher in Palo Alto, California. He is best known for his classroom exercise called "The Third Wave" and the book he wrote about the event, which inspired the made-for-TV movie The Wave and other works, including a theatrical film in 2008. The original TV movie won the Emmy and Peabody Awards. His books The Acorn People and B-Ball have also been made into TV dramas. Jones lives in San Francisco, California where he regularly performs as a storyteller.

== Career ==
In April 1967, while working as a teacher at Cubberley High School in Palo Alto, Jones created a project with his 15-year-old World History students in which they experienced the growth of a fascist movement, called The Wave. Jones intended for this to be only a week-long exercise. He had a designed lesson plan which included a salute, a slogan, and a secret "police" force. The experiment was ended by Jones after complaints from teachers and parents. Jones then revealed that it was an exercise intended to give students a direct experience of how easily they could be misled into behaving like fascists, drawing parallels to the rise of the National Socialist movement in Germany.

Jones says that he was refused tenure at Cubberley High School as a result of his anti-war activities two years after the experiment. There were large student protests against this decision.

Jones has spent the past 30 years working with people with mental disabilities and has written a number of books.

== Personal life ==
Jones was raised on 46th Avenue in the Sunset District during the 1940s and 1950s.

He lives in the Haight Ashbury of San Francisco, with his wife Deanna. He is Jewish.

== The Wave ==
1967 – "The Third Wave," a classroom simulation. Jones created a week-long project for his sophomore History class at Cubberley High School in Palo Alto that was studying Nazi Germany. The experiment was designed to explore the question of how was it that the people of Germany could allow the rise of Fascism under National Socialism and claim ignorance of the atrocities that were committed by them to neighbors and friends. Jones called the classroom experiment "The Third Wave" which simulated how a movement aimed at eliminating democracy can be created, even in a free society.

1976 – "Take as Directed", a short story by Jones about the experiment was first published in the CoEvolution Quarterly (and a few years later in "The Next Whole Earth Catalog". In the 1981 book No Substitute for Madness, it was retitled "The Third Wave".

1981 – The Wave, a TV movie produced by Norman Lear's T.A.T. Communications, starring Bruce Davison, which appeared as an ABC Afterschool Special.

1981 – The Wave, The Classroom Experiment That Went Too Far, a novelization of the TV movie by Todd Strasser (published in Europe under the pseudonym Morton Rhue).

2003 – Finix a musical based on the book and the movie starring Ethan Freeman premiered in Vienna. The musical was written as part of an anti violence campaign.

2008 – Die Welle (The Wave), a German film, directed by Dennis Gansel. This retelling takes place in a German classroom of 2008.

2010 – The Wave, A musical by Jones, directed by Cliff Mayotte, dramaturgy by David Ford. Performed at The Marsh in San Francisco by the Marsh Youth Theater's (MYT's) Teen Troupe.

2010 – Lesson Plan, a documentary film by Philip Neel and Mark Hancock, and featuring Jones. It is distributed by Journeyman. Neel and Hancock were both original Third Wave class members. The film has won a number of awards.

2011 – The Third Wave, a full-length play, script by Jones and Joseph Robinette.

2019 – The Invisible Line, a documentary about The Third Wave class, produced by The History Channel in Germany.

2019 – We Are The Wave, the German Netflix 6-part miniseries inspired by The Wave. This new version takes place in the present day.

== Awards ==
- Christian Book of the Year for The Acorn People
- 1985 American Book Award for Say Ray
- When God Winked and Fellini Grinned, a self-published book, was recommended by Oprah Winfrey on her show about autism.

== Other books ==
- B-Ball: The Team That Never Lost a Game. Random House Children's Books. 1991. ISBN 978-0-553-29404-0.
- The Acorn People. Bantam Books. 1990. ISBN 978-0-553-27385-4.
- Say Ray. Bantam. 1984. ISBN 978-0-553-24349-9.
- Kids Called Crazy. Bantam Books. 1982. ISBN 978-0-553-20689-0.
- No substitute for madness: a teacher, his kids, & the lessons of real life. Island Press. 1981. p. 3. ISBN 978-0-933280-06-9. "Ron Jones (author)."

== Other movies based on Jones writings ==
- The Acorn People, starring Cloris Leachman, LeVar Burton, Ted Bessell
- One Special Victory, starring John Larroquette Inspired by the Jones book "B-Ball" noted above.

== See also ==
- Jane Elliott: Blue Eyes/Brown Eyes Experiment
