= The Acorn People =

1976 book by Ron Jones

- 1977 cover (publ. Bantam Books)
- Author: Ron Jones
- Publication date: January 1, 1976

The Acorn People is a non-fiction book for middle grade readers first published in 1976. It is a memoir by author, educator and storyteller Ron Jones about a summer he spent at a camp for disabled children. It was adapted for television in 1981.

== Summary ==
Ron Jones looks forward to his summer at Camp Wiggin, where he will work as a camp counselor. Although he knows the children who attend Camp Wiggin are disabled, he assumes he will still be able to have fun enjoying the outdoors, hiking, swimming and boating at the camp. He gets very discouraged in the beginning and says some pretty harsh things. When he arrives and meets the children, however, he is at first appalled at how severely disabled they are. Once he gets to know the children, he really starts to fall for them and even gets attached to the camp. When the camp ends, he is even discouraged to see the children leave.

Then Jones meets his group of children—a group called "The Acorn People." They have given themselves this name because of the acorn necklaces they make at camp. Over time, they teach their counselor that despite their disabilities, they are just like everyone else on the inside and that they are capable of accomplishing much more than he previously understood. Jones comes to care for and love these children as much as the full-time staff at Camp Wiggins.

The Acorn People was honored as the Christian Book of the Year.

== Main characters ==
This story begins at Camp Wiggens, a camp that is suited to handicapped children. Ron Jones is a camp counselor and is also in charge of five of the campers along with a man named Dominic. Ron didn't expect Camp Wiggens to be such hard job, as he took the job thinking that the children were not so severely disabled.

- Benny B: An African American child who has no use of his legs because of polio. He is alert and perceptive and known as a speed freak; he is brave, determined, and excitable with a great perspective.
- Spider: Has no arms or legs. Amazingly, he can swim; swimming very close to how a dolphin swims. He also came up with the name "The Acorn People."
- Martin: The most able-bodied person at camp, he is partially blind and usually sways in a rhythm. Very likable and outgoing
- Aaron Gerawlski (A.K.A.) Arid. Smells awful, he has no bladder or the normal means to pull waste.
- Thomas Stewart has muscular sclerosis and weighs about 35 pounds. His body goes limp when he is picked up and he has no muscle control.
