= Boot Camp (novel) =

2007 novel by Todd Strasse

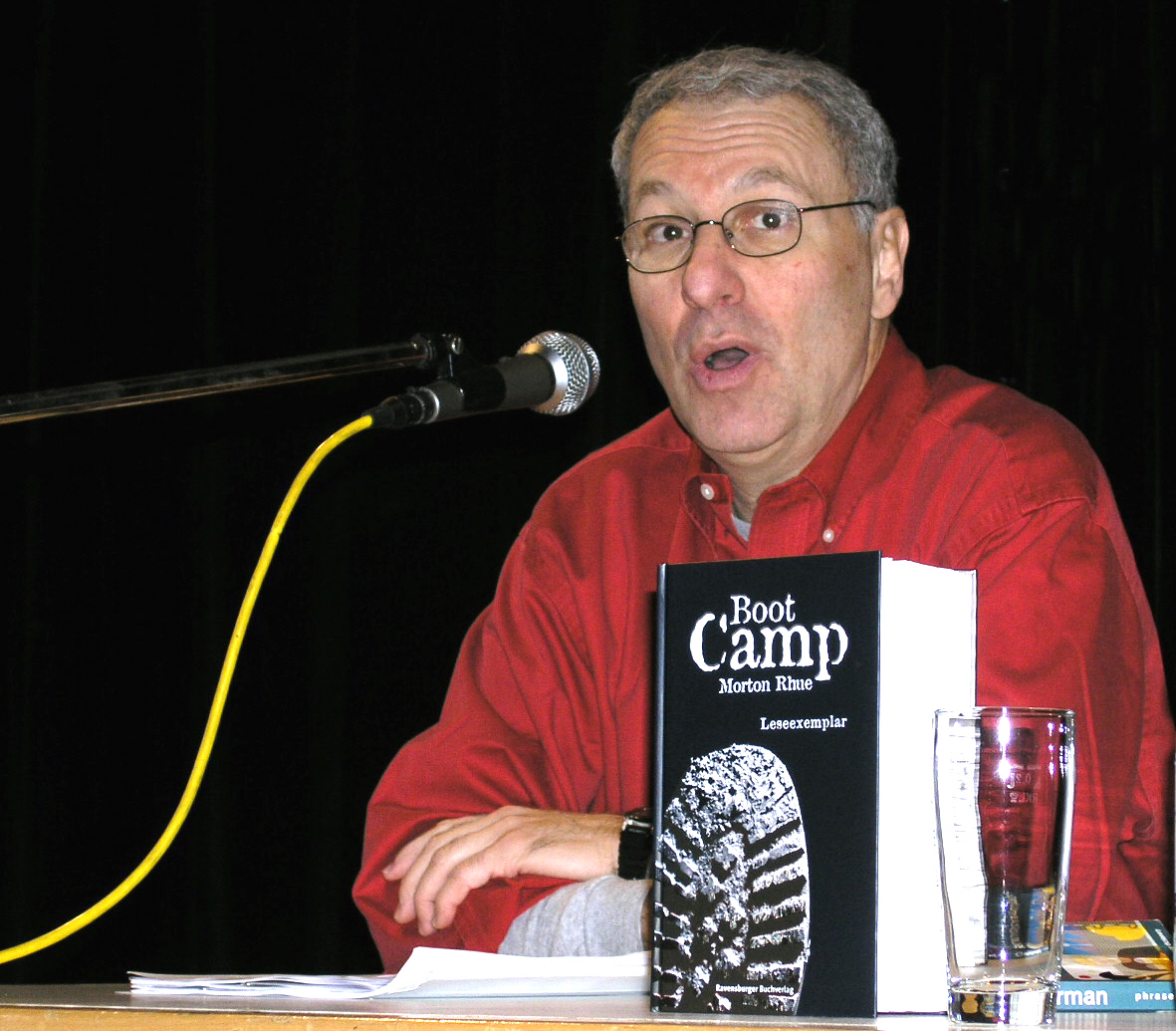
- Todd Strasser (aka "Morton Rhue") reading from his novel Boot Camp in the High School of Langenau/Germany
- Language: English
- Genre: Young adult novel
- Publisher: Simon & Schuster Children's Publishing
- Publication date: 02 May 2007 (1st edition)
- Media type: Print (Hardcover)
- Pages: 235 (Hardcover edition)
- ISBN: 1-4169-0848-X

Boot Camp is a young adult novel by Todd Strasser about a boy who is subjected to physical and psychological abuse when his parents send him to a boot camp.

== Plot ==
A fifteen-year-old boy named Garrett is taken by a pair of bounty hunters and sent to a boot camp in upstate New York called Lake Harmony. Upon his arrival, he learns that his parents have sent him to the facility because he refused to stop having intimate relationships with his former math teacher that was eight years older than him named Sabrina, along with other things including being disobedient, staying out all night, not going to school, stealing money, and occasionally smoking pot. Garrett, a bright and clever kid, feels his actions are justified and does not believe he belongs at Lake Harmony, but he is not allowed to leave until he has admitted his "mistakes" and conforms to the facility's standards of behavior. Staff members are authorized to use "any force necessary" to alter his behaviour, including physical and psychological abuse.

After attempting to talk his way out with no success, he realizes escape is his only option. He escapes Lake Harmony with two friends, Pauly and Sarah, after using chemicals to start a fire. They reach the Canada–US border to escape from legal recapture, and their pursuers' boat begins to sink. He lets his friends out on the other side of the border, and then rescues his pursuers, who bring him back to Lake Harmony, where he is beaten senseless repeatedly. The director demotes all campers, based on the camp's privilege system, and blames Garrett, so he is beaten yet again by the campers and staff. Ultimately, he is reformed. He begins to believe in the treatment, feeling no remorse when those around him are abused. When his parents come to pick him up with an investigator, the investigator asks if he was beaten. He breaks down and says that he was, but deserved it. It is possible that these events caused him to suffer from PTSD, as he appears to suffer from a mental breakdown when admitting what has occurred.

== Reception ==
Kirkus Reviews wrote "Strasser explores the intriguing topic of militaristic boot camps, described as a secret prison system with 4,000 to 10,000 teens, but he undermines his effort with implausible characters and tedious violence." where as Publishers Weekly found "Strasser paints his protagonist as heroic, sympathetic and rational (“The product Lake Harmony delivers is the child you always knew you had... not the one you got stuck with”), and when he is ultimately broken—bodily and spiritually—the tragedy is all the more profound. Strasser offers no easy answers, and nimbly navigates a host of moral gray areas."

== Awards and nominations ==
- American Library Association Quick Pick for Reluctant Readers
- Georgia Peach Book Award for Teen Readers
- New York Public Library Book for the Teen Age
- Abraham Lincoln Illinois High School Book Award
