= The Third Wave (experiment) =

1967 social experiment on the spread of Nazism

The Third Wave was an experimental movement created by American high school history teacher Ron Jones in 1967 in Palo Alto, California to explain how the German population could have accepted the actions of the Nazi regime during the rise of the Third Reich and the Second World War.

While Jones taught his students about Nazi Germany during his senior level Contemporary World History class, he found it difficult to explain how the German people could have accepted the actions of the Nazis. He decided to create a fictional social movement as a demonstration of the appeal of fascism. Over the course of five days, Jones – a member of the Students for a Democratic Society (SDS), and sponsor of the Cubberley United Student Movement – conducted a series of exercises in his classroom emphasizing discipline and community, intended to model certain characteristics of the Nazi movement.

As the movement grew outside his class and began to number in the hundreds, the experiment had spiralled out of control. He convinced the students to attend a rally where he claimed that the classroom project was part of a nationwide movement and that the announcement of a Third Wave presidential candidate would be televised. Upon their arrival, the students were presented with a blank channel. Jones told his students of the true nature of the movement as an experiment in fascism, and he presented to them a short film discussing the actions of Nazi Germany.

The project was adapted into a book; an American film, The Wave, in 1981; and a critically acclaimed German film, Die Welle, in 2008.

== Background ==
The experiment took place at Cubberley High School in Palo Alto, California, during the first week of April 1967. (Note: In which was published on Friday, April 7, reports of "strange happenings in Mr. Jones' Contemporary History classes" are mentioned. "It has something to do with the Gestapo and curved hands..." This confirms that the movement was active, but not yet finished in the week starting on April 3, 1967. In published on April 21, the experiment is dated "two weeks ago", which also puts the experiment in the first week of April – it specifically calls out "...Wednesday, April 5, the last day of the movement.") Jones, finding himself unable to explain to his students how the German people could have claimed ignorance of The Holocaust, decided to demonstrate it to them instead. He started a movement called "The Third Wave" and told his students that the movement aimed to eliminate democracy. Jones postulated that democracy's focus on individuality was against mankind's "authoritarian" nature, which he aimed to emphasize with the movement's motto: "Strength through discipline, strength through involvement."

Although the experiment was not well documented at the time, it was briefly mentioned in two issues of the Cubberley High School student newspaper, The Cubberley Catamount. A contemporary issue of the paper contains a more detailed account of the experiment, published just days after its conclusion. Jones wrote a short story about the experiment, first published 1976, some nine years after its conclusion. Subsequent articles by other authors followed, some featuring interviews with Jones and the students involved.

== Chronology ==
=== First day ===
The experiment began with simple alterations such as proper seating. He wrote "Strength Through Discipline" on the classroom's chalkboard, then enforced strict classroom discipline while speaking about the importance of discipline. Students were expected to sit at attention before the second bell, had to stand up to ask or answer questions and had to do so in three words or fewer, and were required to preface each remark with "Mr. Jones". He drilled them on their adherence to these rules. Jones intended only a one-day experiment.

=== Second day ===
Jones decided to continue the experiment after observing his students' strict adherence to the previous day's rules. He added "Strength Through Community" to the chalk board, and named his movement "the Third Wave". Jones based the name of his movement on the supposed fact that the third in a series of waves is the strongest. Jones created a salute involving a cupped right hand reaching up close to the right shoulder. He ordered class members to salute each other both in and outside of the class. Jones then assigned each of his students an individual assignment, such as designing a Third Wave banner, stopping non-members from entering the class, or recruiting their friends to join the movement. He told students that those who complied and participated would receive an A grade, students who participated but did not agree would receive a C, and students who tried to revolt would get an F..

=== Third day ===
Students from across the school joined the movement. The class expanded from its initial 30 students to a total of 43. Jones added "Strength Through Action" to the chalkboard. Students were issued a member card. Jones instructed the students on how to initiate new members. By the end of the day the movement had over 200 participants. Jones instructed three students to report to him when other members of the movement failed to abide by the rules. He was surprised when around twenty of the students made such reports. A student who expressed concern for Jones's safety volunteered to become his bodyguard. He issued membership cards and also banned students from congregating in more than groups of 3.

=== Fourth day ===
Jones decided to terminate the movement, as it was slipping out of his control as a student who was his bodyguard followed him into the staffroom and a teacher tried to throw him out. The students had become more and more involved in the project. Jones announced to the class that this movement was a part of a nationwide movement and that on the next day a presidential candidate of the Third Wave would announce its existence to the public. He ordered students to attend a noon rally on Friday to witness the announcement. Jones also ordered four students to banish three girls dissenting students to the school library and to prevent them from attending the rally to emphasize loyalty to the movement's precepts.

=== Fifth and final day ===
The students all arrived at 11:50 a.m. Jones had convinced a number of his friends to pose as reporters, and asked the students to demonstrate what they had learned in the minutes before the televised address would supposedly begin. He then led them in shouting chants of "Strength through discipline! Strength through community! Strength through action!" He turned on the TV placed in the middle of the room. Rather than a televised address of their leader, the students were presented with an empty channel. After a few minutes of waiting, Jones announced that they had been a part of an experiment in fascism and that they all had willingly created a sense of superiority, much as German citizens had done in the period of Nazi Germany. He then apologized to them for how far it all had gone, and played them a film about the Nazi regime to conclude the experiment.

== Documentaries ==
Lesson Plan, which retold the story of the Third Wave through interviews with the original students and teacher, debuted at the Mill Valley Film Festival on October 10, 2010. It was produced by Philip Neel and Mark Hancock, two of Jones's own former students.

A German documentary entitled The Invisible Line (Die Geschichte der Welle) debuted on television on December 19, 2019. This also featured interviews with Jones and former students.

=== Dramatizations ===
- The events of the experiment were adapted into a 1981 US TV special, The Wave. This formed the basis for the Young Adult novelization of the same name written by Todd Strasser, under the pseudonym of Morton Rhue. The special and novelization updated the setting to the modern day.
- It Can't Happen Here, the 86th book in the Sweet Valley Twins series, features a substitute teacher who conducts an experiment similar to The Third Wave. The title references a novel of the same name.
- In 2001, a musical adaptation written by Olaf Pyttlik premiered at the Royal Manitoba Theatre Centre in Canada.
- The 2008 German film Die Welle transferred the experiment to a modern-day German classroom. The film received critical acclaim.
- In 2010, Jones staged a musical called The Wave, written with some of the students in the class.
- The events were adapted into a non-musical stage play in 2011 by Joseph Robinette and Ron Jones.
- In 2020, a Netflix miniseries called We Are the Wave premiered in Germany. The show is about high school students, and their own activism.

== See also ==
- Jane Elliott, who created the "Blue eyes/Brown eyes" exercise
- Unethical human experimentation in the United States
