= The Wave (novel) =

1981 novel by Todd Strasser/Morton Rhue

- First edition
- Author: Todd Strasser
- Language: English
- Genre: Young adult novel
- Publisher: Dell
- Publication date: 1981
- Publication place: United States
- Media type: Print (paperback)
- Pages: 143
- ISBN: 0-440-99371-7

The Wave is a 1981 young adult novel by Todd Strasser under the pen name Morton Rhue (though it has been reprinted under Todd Strasser's real name). It is a novelization of a teleplay by Johnny Dawkins for the movie The Wave, a fictionalized account of the "Third Wave" teaching experiment by Ron Jones that took place in an Ellwood P. Cubberley High School history class in Palo Alto, California. The novel by Strasser won the 1981 Massachusetts Book Award for Children's/Young Adult literature.

== Plot ==
The setting of the book is Gordon High School in Spring 1969. The plot revolves around history teacher Mr. Ben Ross, his high school students, and an experiment he conducts in an attempt to teach them what it may have been like living in Third Reich Germany. Unsatisfied with his own inability to answer his students' earnest questions of how and why, Mr. Ross initiates the experiment (The Wave) in hopes that it answers the question of why the Germans allowed Adolf Hitler and the Nazi Party to rise to power, acting in a manner inconsistent with their own pre-existing moral values.

Ross considers this and plans an experiment: the next day, he starts to indoctrinate the class using the slogan STRENGTH THROUGH DISCIPLINE, ordering them around in ways such as sitting in a specific way, and telling how to answer questions. The class reacts well to this, embracing the sense of empowerment it gives them, and they continue their newly disciplined behavior into a second day of class, surprising Ross. He decides to take the experiment further and create a group, The Wave, adding two more slogans—STRENGTH THROUGH COMMUNITY and STRENGTH THROUGH ACTION—which leads to further rules of conduct, a symbol, a salute, and an organizational structure.

Laurie Saunders, a student in Mr. Ross's class early in the week, starts to think that The Wave is having too much of an impact. Laurie receives a letter for the school paper, of which she is editor in chief, detailing how members try to recruit others with bullying. That weekend, the football team is unable to win against Clarkstown, as their newfound drive does not compensate for a lack of proper training and planning. Laurie's boyfriend David is confused by this turn of events, as the football team had joined the Wave, while Laurie and her staff on The Grapevine plan a special issue of the paper devoted exclusively to The Wave and the negative impact it has had on the school. While some thank her, especially the teachers and the principal, others do not. David, who has been in The Wave since the beginning, tries to get her to stop bad-mouthing it. He eventually shoves her to the ground and this makes him realize how dangerous The Wave really is. Now united in the belief that The Wave must be stopped, Laurie and David go to Ben's home to convince him to terminate the program. He tells them he will do exactly that, but that they must trust his moves the next day.

He calls a Wave meeting in the auditorium and requests that only Wave members be present. They gather in a similar fashion to the Nazi rallies, even equipped with banners and armbands emblazoned with the Wave. Ben tells The Wave members that they are only one in many schools across the nation that is involved in the Wave, and that they are about to see the leader of the whole organization and that he is going to speak to all of them on television to create a National Wave Party for Youths. Everyone is shocked when Mr. Ross projects the image of Adolf Hitler. He explains that there is no leader, and that there is no National Wave Party. If there were a leader, it would be the man on the projection screen. He explains how their obedience led them to act like Nazis. The shocked students drop all their Wave-branded trinkets and items, and slowly leave the room. As Ben turns to leave, the one person who really flourished in the Wave, Robert, is standing alone, upset that The Wave ended. During The Wave, he was finally accepted as an equal, no one picked on him, and he had friends, but his new-found social status is now worthless without The Wave.

== Characters ==
- Laurie Saunders: Main protagonist of the novel, straight A student and head of her high school newspaper, The Gordon Grapevine. Initially supports the Wave but as the novel progresses she begins to see it for what it really is, a mini revival of the Third Reich. Because Laurie sees the Wave for what it is that she chooses to distance herself from it and all those who are involved which subsequently causes her to be branded as an "enemy".
- Amy Smith: Laurie's long time friend, in constant competition with Laurie, which puts a strain on their friendship; a strain which finally comes to a boil when the Wave is in full swing and Laurie is no longer "special."
- Robert Billings: Class loser who is more often the butt of many jokes. Described as creepy and weird, "he was a heavy boy with shirttails perpetually hanging out and his hair always a mess". Robert Billings's sloppy appearance and lack of interest towards his studies stems from the fact that he lives in the shadow of his older brother, Jeff Billings, who was the quintessential model student. It is through the Wave that Robert is able to step out of his brother's shadow and establish his own personality (even though the Wave is all about unity), hence why Robert is really the only one who actually stands to lose something after the downfall of the Wave.
- David Collins: Laurie's boyfriend, described as "a tall, good-looking boy who was a running back on the football team". He winds up getting in too deep with the Wave and carries it out from the classroom and onto the football field in an attempt to unite their losing team.
- Ben Ross: High school history teacher who tends to get engrossed in his work "to the point where he tended to forget that the rest of the world existed". Some of the many things in which Ben Ross would devote his attention to were: American Indians, bridge, and even the Third Reich. His personality is best described as obsessive to the point of insanity, mainly due to the incredible time and effort he puts into a particular field of interest. He's described as a young, good-looking and charismatic new teacher, his excitement being 'contagious' so his students can't help but go along with him. He also has a hard time getting the entire class interested in the lessons, and also has trouble getting them to come in on time and hand in neat assignments. Devises The Wave to show what life in Nazi Germany was like, but he gets caught up in it as well. Initially it is met with great success, but soon goes too far.
- Carl Block: Investigative reporter for The Gordon Grapevine, he is a perpetually funny "tall, thin guy with blond hair."
- Alex Cooper: Music reviewer for The Gordon Grapevine and friend to Carl Block. Is "stocky and dark."
- Brad: A boy who enjoys bullying Robert Billings.

== Recognition ==
Strasser's novel won the 1981 Massachusetts Book Award for Children's/Young Adult Literature.

== See also ==
- The Wave (TV special)
- The Wave (2008 film)
- We Are the Wave (TV series)
- The Wave Home – Official website of The Wave: story history, FAQ, links, etc. by original Third Wave students
