= We Are the Wave =

2019 German mini TV series

- Promotional poster
- Genre: Drama; Mystery
- Based on: The Wave by Todd Strasser
- Written by: Jan Berger; Ipek Zübert; Kai Hafemeister; Thorsten Wettcke; Christine Heinlein
- Directed by: Anca Miruna Lăzărescu; Mark Monheim
- Starring: Ludwig Simon; Luise Befort; Michelle Barthel; Daniel Friedl; Mohamed Issa
- Composer: Heiko Maile
- Country of origin: Germany
- Original language: German
- No. of seasons: 1
- No. of episodes: 6

Production
- Executive producer: Dennis Gansel
- Producer: Christian Becker
- Cinematography: Jan-Marcello Kahl
- Editor: Ann-Carolin Biesenbach
- Camera setup: Single-camera
- Running time: 45–54 minutes
- Production companies: Rat Pack Filmproduktion; Sony Pictures Film und Fernseh Produktion

Original release
- Network: Netflix
- Release: 1 November 2019

We Are the Wave (German 'Wir sind die Welle') is a German coming-of-age drama television series that is loosely based on the 1981 novel The Wave by Todd Strasser. The series premiered on Netflix on 1 November 2019.

== Synopsis ==
The series takes place in the fictitious German city of Meppersfeld. It tells the story of a group of teenagers who decide to fight together against injustice and social problems.

Lea, a high school student from a wealthy family, is bored and frustrated by her privileged life. She doubts her parents' way of life, who consider themselves to be cosmopolitan and environmentally aware. Lea feels that she wants to do more than them in order to create a better world. When Tristan, a new classmate, comes to Meppersfeld and quickly makes friends with the outsiders Zazie, Rahim and Hagen, Lea's interest is aroused.

Tristan uses the personal circumstances of the very different teenagers in order to inspire them for a common fight against grievances and injustices. Rahim and his family, for example, are regularly attacked racially. In addition, his family is threatened with the loss of their apartment because an investor wants to renovate the building into expensive luxury apartments. Hagen's parents who are organic farmers lost their economic livelihood after waste sludge from a local paper mill contaminated their fields. Zazie is bullied by classmates and feels oppressed by sexist gender stereotypes she doesn't match. After a short hesitation, Lea also joins the group, which meets in the afternoon on an abandoned factory site to plan the next steps together.

Driven by Tristan, the actions of the group, which is soon to be called "The Wave", are becoming increasingly radical and risky. What begins as an idealistic and playful revolt against the establishment, soon gets a threatening momentum. Central is the conflict between Lea, who believes in peaceful forms of protest and resistance, and Tristan, who considers Lea's optimism naive and is vehemently opposed to opening the group to other members.

As the story progresses, it becomes clear that Tristan has personal motives for his radicalism and is planning a terrorist action against a major gun manufacturer (his mother was killed in an aid mission in Africa by soldiers who came into possession of German weapons through illegal arms exports). In the showdown, Lea can prevent Tristan's attack in the last moment. With a media-effective action, Lea manages to inflict great economic damage on the weapons manufacturer, who has violated numerous legal requirements.

== Cast and characters ==
=== Main ===
- Ludwig Simon as Tristan Broch, the new boy at school with a troubled past, leader of The Wave and Lea's love interest
- Luise Befort as Lea Herst, a wealthy girl who is fed up of her life, member of The Wave and Tristan's love interest
- Michelle Barthel as Zazie Elsner, a student who is constantly bullied, member of The Wave, Hagen's love interest, has a crush on Tristan and was once bullied by Lea
- Daniel Friedl as Hagen Lemmart, an antisocial boy, member of the Wave and has a crush on Zazie
- Mohamed Issa as Rahim Hadad, an Arab who is bullied because of his race; member of The Wave, and Paula's love interest

=== Recurring ===
- Milena Tscharntke as Sophie, Lea's best friend
- Leon Seidel as Rahim's bully
- Bela Lenz as Rahim's bully
- Robert Schupp
- Stephan Grossmann
- Kristin Hunold as Kim, Zazie's bully
- Sarah Mahita as Paula, Rahim's love interest
- Luis Pintsch
- Bianca Hein as Rike Herst, Lea's mother
- Christian Erdmann as Andreas Herst, Lea's father
- Jascha Baum as Luis
- Nicole Johannhanwahr as Hagen's mother
- Stefan Lampadius as Teacher Fleisser
- Livia Matthes as Nikki, Tristan's old friend
- Daniel Faust as drug dealer
- Leander Paul Gerdes
- Manuel Klein as Giese

== Episodes ==
No.	Title	Directed by	Written by	Original release date
1	"Do You Know That Feeling?"	Anca Miruna Lăzărescu	Jan Berger	November 1, 2019
2	"What’s Wrong with You?"	Anca Miruna Lăzărescu	Jan Berger, Ipek Zübert	November 1, 2019
3	"What's Next?"	Mark Monheim	Jan Berger, Kai Hafemeister	November 1, 2019
4	"You’re Destroying Everything!"	Mark Monheim	Jan Berger, Kai Hafemeister, Christine Heinlein, Thorsten Wettcke, Ipek Zübert	November 1, 2019
5	"The 99%!"	Anca Miruna Lăzărescu	Jan Berger, Kai Hafemeister, Thorsten Wettcke, Ipek Zübert	November 1, 2019
6	"It's the Only Way"	Mark Monheim	Jan Berger, Kai Hafemeister, Thorsten Wettcke, Ipek Zübert	November 1, 2019

== Production ==
On April 18, 2018, Netflix announced the series as part of its event See What's Next in Rome, which at that time still bore the working title The Wave. The shooting of the first season lasted from 11 February 2019 to 6 May 2019, and took place in several cities in North Rhine-Westphalia, including Cologne, Hürth, Leverkusen, Düren, Euskirchen, Neuss, Wuppertal, Solingen, Gelsenkirchen-Ückendorf & Hassel, Remagen and Bonn.

The series is produced by Rat Pack Filmproduktion in collaboration with Sony Pictures Film und Fernseh Produktion. The scripts are by Ipek Zübert, Kai Hafemeister and Thorsten Wettcke under the head-authorship of Jan Berger. The series is directed by Anca Miruna Lăzărescu and Mark Monheim. Executive Producer is Dennis Gansel.
