= The Wave (1981 film) =

American TV movie

- Genre: Drama
- Based on: Account by Ron Jones
- Screenplay by: Johnny Dawkins
- Directed by: Alexander Grasshoff
- Starring: Bruce Davison (Ben Ross)
- Country of origin: United States
- Original language: English

Production
- Executive producer: Virginia L. Carter
- Producer: Fern Field
- Cinematography: Hanania Baer
- Editor: Mario Di Mambro
- Running time: 46 mins.
- Production company: T.A.T. Communications Company

Original release
- Network: ABC
- Release: October 4, 1981

The Wave is a made-for-TV movie directed by Alex Grasshoff, based on The Third Wave experiment put on by teacher Ron Jones to explain to his students how the German populace could accept the actions of the Nazi regime. It debuted October 4, 1981, and aired again almost two years later as an ABC Afterschool Special. It starred Bruce Davison as the teacher Ben Ross, a character based on Jones.

== Summary ==
Ben Ross, a school social studies teacher, shows his class a film about the Holocaust. They question how the German people would have allowed genocide to occur. Unable to explain the question for himself, Ross decides to find out through a social experiment. He begins in an innocuous fashion with advice on proper posture and a few classroom rules for better efficiency. The students take up the rules with enthusiasm. Ross continues the next day by introducing The Wave, which he describes as a youth movement with a secret salute and membership card. Robert, an unpopular student, is given the role of monitor over the other students, a position which fills him with pride.

David, a student, thinks that the Wave's rules will help his football team. With the popular football players now on board, the Wave's popularity spreads across the school. By the end of the week, Robert has developed confidence and authority and reports unorthodox behavior to Ross and the other Wave members. David's girlfriend Laurie is unnerved and Ross's wife Christy (who also teaches at the same school) worries that Ross has introduced a concept he cannot control.

The next day, a pep rally has turned into a Wave event. Two hundred more students join. Laurie writes an exposé for the school paper. David breaks up with her and friends reject her. Other students are bullied by members and voice concerns to parents and administrators, who in turn complain to Ross. Ross begs for enough time to complete the experiment.

The exposé is published. The Wave denounces the school paper and singles out Laurie for attack. Fearing for her, David warns her to stop speaking out, then gets violent enough to push her to the ground. David realizes now how far things have gone. David and Laurie visit Ross at his home later that evening and beg him to speak out against the movement. Ross says he agrees the experiment is out of control. He promises them that he will put an end to it.

The following day, Ross tells students that the Wave is a real youth movement taking place in schools all over the country. The movement's leader will give a televised speech tomorrow. The eager Wave students assemble in the auditorium – including David and Laurie. Ross exposes them both as traitors to the cause and has them escorted out, much to their shock and disbelief. He then begins the event by standing in front of the stage where two TV monitors are set up. The monitors are energized, but only display white noise. After this continues for a moment, a student stands up and asks if Ross is lying about the existence of the movement's leader.

Ross assures the student and the rest that there is – and much to the students' shock and horror – the monitors suddenly display a film of Adolf Hitler leading a Nazi rally. Ross tell them that this is their leader and that the experiment proves how quickly a group can give up their individual beliefs. The stunned students throw away their armbands and leave. Robert, who has been given his first sense of belonging by the movement, is left in tears. Ross takes Robert away to comfort him.

== Cast ==
- Bruce Davison as Ben Ross (the history teacher)
- Lori Lethin as Laurie (sometimes spelled Lauree)
- John Putch as David
- Johnny Doran as Robert
- Pasha Gray as Amy
- Wesley Pfenning as Christy Ross (Ben Ross's wife)
- Marc Copage as Eric (credited as “Student”)
- Robert DeLapp as Brad
- Matthew Dunn as Brian
- Teri Ralston as Mrs. Saunders
- Larry Keith as Mr. Saunders
- Jamie Rose as Andrea T

== Production team ==
- Director: Alexander Grasshoff
- Teleplay: Johnny Dawkins; based on an account by Ron Jones
- Executive Producer: Virginia L. Carter
- Producer: Fern Field
- Editor: Mario Di Mambro
- Cinematography: Hanania Baer
- Music: John Anderson
- Art Direction: Cary White

== Awards ==
The TV film won a 1982 Emmy for Outstanding Children's Program, and a 1981 Peabody Award and a 1981 Young Artist Award for Best Television Special – Family Enjoyment.

Writer Johnny Dawkins was nominated for a 1982 Humanitas Prize in the 60-minute category, and a 1983 Writers Guild of America Award for Best Children's Show.

== Related works ==
Todd Strasser's novelization of the same name was released the same year. It originally appeared under Strasser's pseudonym of Morton Rhue. Ron Jones's article and the TV movie's screenplay were the basis of the 2008 German film Die Welle.
