= Todd Strasser =

American novelist

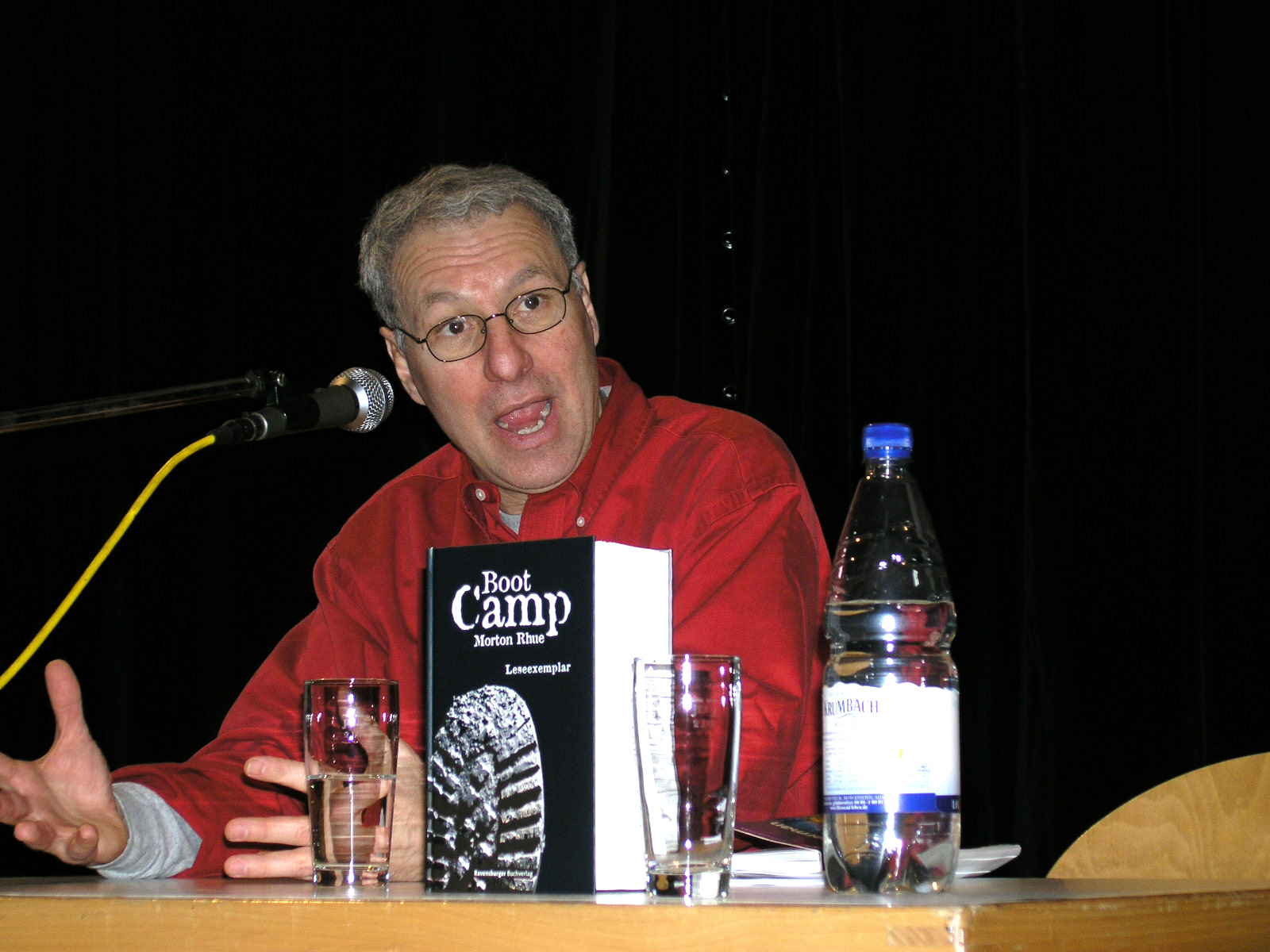
- Strasser in 2006
- Born: May 5, 1950 (age 76); New York City, US
- Education: College
- Alma mater: Beloit College
- Occupations: Writer, journalist
- Writing career
- Pen name: Morton Rhue; T. S. Rue
- Period: 1979–present (as writer)
- Genres: Children's and young adult fiction, novelizations, romans
- Subject: Literature
- Notable works: Fallout, The Wave, Price of Duty, Give A Boy A Gun
- Website: toddstrasser.com

Signature
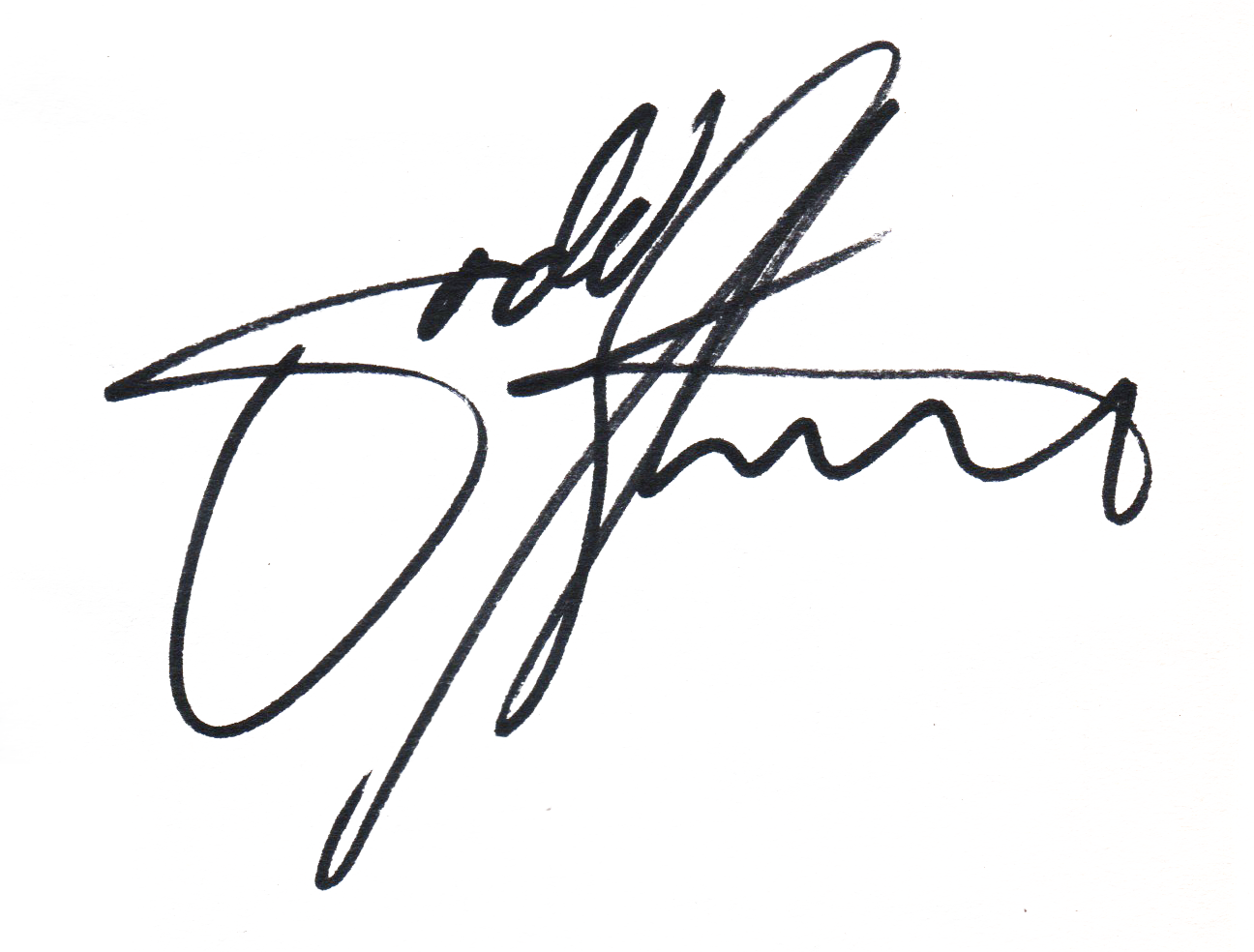

Todd Strasser (born May 5, 1950) is an American writer of more than 140 young-adult and middle grade novels and many short stories and works of non-fiction, some written under the pen names Morton Rhue and T.S. Rue.

== Biography ==
Strasser was born in New York City. He studied literature and creative writing at New York University and Beloit College, then worked as a reporter for the Middletown Times Herald-Record newspaper, and as a copywriter for Compton Advertising in New York City.

His first novel was Angel Dust Blues (1978). He is the father of two children, and an avid tennis player and surfer. Under the pen name Morton Rhue, he wrote the novelisation of the movie The Wave, which became a bestseller. He also wrote such novels as Boot Camp, No Place, No Home, Ghetto Kidz, and Asphalt Tribe. Strasser's newest novels are Price of Duty and Summer of '69. Price of Duty shows how the military uses promises of heroics, teamwork, and excitement to entice young people to enlist despite the life and death risks. The book has received uniformly outstanding reviews and was named an Amazon Young Adult Book of the Month for July, 2018, as well as a 2018 New York Public Library Best Book for Teens.

Summer of '69 is Strasser's autobiographical novel/memoir about his life during the summer of Woodstock, the war in Vietnam, and the first man to set foot on the Moon. It was written for adults and mature teens and explores the culture, drug use, sexual mores, and music of the 1960s, as well as his own problems with the military draft and the rupture to his family caused by a nearly forgotten tragedy many years before. Reviewing for Booklist, Ilene Cooper wrote: "Drugs, sex, and rock 'n' roll, those hallmarks of the summer of 1969, are all here, but there's so much more... The story captures the mood and spirit of the times …The best part transcends eras: Lucas' introspection as he contemplates his place in the world.”

== Themes ==
Strasser often writes about themes such as nuclear war, Nazism, bullying at schools, homelessness, and school shootings. His novel The Wave, written under the pen name Morton Rhue, is a novelization of the teleplay by Johnny Dawkins for the 1981 television movie The Wave. Both the novel and the television movie are fictionalized accounts of the "Third Wave" teaching experiment by Ron Jones in a Cubberley High School history class in Palo Alto, California. The novel has been translated into more than a dozen languages and is read in many schools around the world.

His 2014 novel, Fallout, is part memoir and part speculative fiction featuring nuclear war that results from the 1962 Cuban Missile Crisis. A review in The New York Times called it "Exciting, harrowing ... Superb entertainment ... It thrums along with finely wrought atmosphere and gripping suspense."

Strasser's works have sometimes proved to be controversial. Recently, his novel American Terrorist was withdrawn from publication in the United States after an uproar about it caused by a brief description of the book which appeared on Goodreads. The novel has been published in Germany under the title Dschihad Online, and in France with the title Djihad Online.

Strasser is the author of the Time Zone High trilogy, How I Changed My Life, How I Created My Perfect Prom Date, and How I Spent My Last Night on Earth. How I Created My Perfect Prom Date was adapted for the feature film Drive Me Crazy, starring Adrian Grenier and Melissa Joan Hart.

Other novels for young adults include The Accident, which became the television movie Over the Limit, as well as Angel Dust Blues, Friends Till the End, and A Very Touchy Subject. The latter also became a television movie, entitled Can a Guy Say No? Another novel, Workin' For Peanuts, was adapted to a television movie with the same title.

A trilogy of mystery thrillers for older young adult readers includes Wish You Were Dead, Blood on My Hands, and Kill You Last.

Strasser has also written a number of young adult series, including Impact Zone (about surfing), Drift X (about drift car competitions), and Here Comes Heavenly (about a punk nanny with magical powers).

His books for middle-graders include CON-fidence, The Diving Bell, and Abe Lincoln for Class President. His series for middle graders include the 17-book Help! I'm Trapped... collection, as well as the Don't Get Caught, Against the Odds, and Camp Run-A-Muck books. He wrote Is That a Dead Dog in Your Locker?, Is That a Sick Cat in Your Backpack?, Is That a Glow-In-The-Dark Bunny in Your Pillow Case?, Is That an Angry Penguin in Your Gym Bag?, and Is That an Unlucky Leprechaun In Your Lunch?

His Kids' Books series of E-books includes The Kids' Book of Gross Facts and Feats (two volumes), The Kids' Book of Weird Science, The Kids' Book of Stupendously Stupid Stunts, The Kids' Book of Really Dumb American Criminals, The Kids' Book of Amazing Sports Facts and Feats, The Kids' Book of Funny Animal Jokes, and others.

Strasser has published articles and short stories in The New Yorker, Esquire, and The New York Times.

== Awards and honors ==
Fallout (2013)

1. 2014 American Library Association Best Fiction for Young Adults
2. 2014 American Library Association Quick Pick for Reluctant Young Adult Readers
3. 2014 National Council for the Social Studies Notable Tradebook for Young People
4. 2014 International Reading Association Young Adults' Choice
5. 2014 Bank Street Teacher's College Best Children's Books of the Year

No Place (2014)

1. 2015 National Council for the Social Studies Notable Tradebook for Young People

If I Grow Up (2009)

1. 2010 National Council for the Social Studies Notable Tradebook for Young People

Boot Camp (2007)

1. 2008 American Library Association Quick Pick for Reluctant Young Adult Readers
2. 2015 American Library Association Popular Paperback for Young Adults

Can't Get There From Here (2004)

1. 2005 American Library Association Best Fiction for Young Adults
2. 2005 American Library Association Quick Pick for Reluctant Young Adult Readers
3. 2006 International Reading Association Young Adults' Choice
4. 2010 American Library Association Popular Paperback for Young Adults

Give A Boy A Gun (2001)

1. 2002 International Reading Association Young Adults' Choice
2. 2006 American Library Association Popular Paperback for Young Adults

Wish You Were Dead (2009)

1. 2011 American Library Association Quick Pick for Reluctant Young Adult Readers
2. 2011 Tayshas (Texas Library Association): Summer Reading List
3. 2012 New York Public Library: Books for the Teen Age.
4. 2012 Illinois: Abraham Lincoln H.S. Book Award
5. 2012 Voice of Youth Advocates Summer Reading List

== Bibliography ==
=== Help! I'm Trapped ===
1. Help! I'm Trapped in My Teacher's Body (1993)
2. Help! I'm Trapped in the First Day of School (1994)
3. Help! I'm Trapped in Obedience School (1995)
4. Help! I'm Trapped in My Gym Teacher's Body (1996)
5. Help! I'm Trapped in the President's Body (1996)
6. Help! I'm Trapped in My Sister's Body (1997)
7. Help! I'm Trapped in the First Day of Summer Camp (1997)
8. Help, I'm Trapped in Obedience School Again (1997)
9. Help, I'm Trapped in Santa's Body (1997)
10. Help! I'm Trapped in an Alien's Body (1998)
11. Help! I'm Trapped in My Principal's Body (1998)
12. Help! I'm Trapped in My Camp Counselor's Body (1998)
13. Help! I'm Trapped in a Movie Star's Body (1999)
14. Help! I'm Trapped in My Lunch Lady's Body (1999)
15. Help! I'm Trapped in a Professional Wrestler's Body (2000)
16. Help! I'm Trapped in a Vampire's Body (2000)
17. Help! I'm Trapped in a Supermodel's Body (2001)

=== Lifeguards ===
1. Summers Promise (1993)
2. Summer's End (1993)

=== Wordsworth ===
1. Wordsworth and the Cold Cut Catastrophe (1995)
2. Wordsworth and the Kibble Kidnapping (1995)
3. Wordsworth and the Roast Beef Romance (1995)
4. Wordsworth and the Mail-Order Meatloaf Mess (1995)
5. Wordsworth and the Tasty Treat Trick (1996)
6. Wordsworth and the Lip-Smacking Licorice Love Affair (1996)

=== How I... ===
1. How I Changed My Life (1995)
2. How I Created My Perfect Prom Date (1998)
3. How I Spent My Last Night on Earth (1998)

=== Rock 'n' Roll Summer ===
1. The Boys in the Band (1996)
2. Playing for Love (1996)

=== Camp Run-A-Muck ===
1. Greasy Grimy Gopher Guts (1997)
2. Mutilated Monkey Meat (1997)
3. Chopped-Up Birdy's Feet (1997)

=== Against the Odds ===
1. Grizzly Attack (1998)
2. Buzzard's Feast (1999)
3. Gator Prey (1999)
4. Shark Bite (1998)

=== Impact Zone ===
1. Take Off (2004)
2. Cut Back (2004)
3. Close Out (1999)

=== Here Comes Heavenly ===
1. Here Comes Heavenly (1999)
2. Dance Magic (1999)
3. Pastabilities (2000)
4. Spell Danger (2000)

=== Don't Get Caught ===
1. Driving the School Bus (2000)
2. Wearing the Lunch Lady's Hairnet (2001)
3. In the Girl's Locker Room (2001)
4. In the Teacher's Lounge (2001)

=== DriftX ===
1. Slide or Die (2006)
2. Battle Drift (2006)
3. Sidewayz Glory (2006)

=== Mob Princess ===
1. For Money and Love (2007)
2. Stolen Kisses, Secrets, and Lies (2007)
3. Count Your Blessings (2007)

=== Nighttime ===
1. Too Dark to See (2007)
2. Too Scared to Sleep (2007)
3. Too Afraid to Scream (2008)

=== Thrillogy ===
1. Wish You Were Dead (2009)
2. Blood on My Hands (2010)
3. Kill You Last (2011)

=== Crematory Mystery Romance ===
1. Young Hearts Aflame (2022)

=== Standalone books ===
Title	Publisher	Publication date	ISBN	Notes
Angel Dust Blues	Coward, McCann & Geoghegan, Inc.	1979	ISBN 0-698-20485-9/ISBN 978-0-698-20485-0	Todd Strasser's first novel.
Friends Till the End	Delacorte Press	1981	ISBN 0-440-02750-0/ISBN 978-0-440-02750-8	
The Wave	Dell	1981	ISBN 0-14-037188-5	Novelization of the 1981 ABC television film The Wave; Todd Strasser's first novelization.
Rock 'N' Roll Nights	Delacorte Press	1982	ISBN 0-440-07407-X/ISBN 978-0-440-07407-6	
Workin' for Peanuts	Delacorte Press	1983	ISBN 0-440-09401-1/ISBN 978-0-440-09401-2	
Turn It Up!	Delacorte Press	1984	ISBN 0-385-29282-1/ISBN 978-0-385-29282-5	Sequel to Rock 'N' Roll Nights.
The Complete Computer Popularity Program	Delacorte Press	1984	ISBN 0-385-29352-6/ISBN 978-0-385-29352-5	
A Very Touchy Subject	Delacorte Press	1985	ISBN 0-385-29378-X/ISBN 978-0-385-29378-5	
Ferris Bueller's Day Off	Signet Books	June 1986	ISBN 0-451-14535-6/ISBN 978-0-451-14535-2	Novelization of the 1986 Paramount Pictures film Ferris Bueller's Day Off.
Wildlife	Delacorte Press	1987	ISBN 0-385-29560-X/ISBN 978-0-385-29560-4	Sequel to Rock 'N' Roll Nights and Turn It Up!.
The Mall from Outer Space	Scholastic	October 1987	ISBN 0-590-40319-2/ISBN 978-0-590-40319-1	
The Family Man	St. Martin's Press	February 1988	ISBN 0-312-01427-9/ISBN 978-0-312-01427-8	Strasser's first adult fiction.
The Accident	Delacorte Press	1988	ISBN 0-440-50061-3/ISBN 978-0-440-50061-2	Adapted for television as an installment of the series ABC Afterschool Special (Season 18, Episode 5 "Over the Limit") (1990).
Cookie	Signet Books	1989	ISBN 0-451-15991-8/ISBN 978-0-451-15991-5	Novelization of the 1989 Warner Bros. film Cookie.
Pink Cadillac	Signet Books	May 1989	ISBN 0-451-16356-7/ISBN 978-0-451-16356-1	Novelization of the 1989 film Pink Cadillac.
Beyond the Reef	Delacorte Press	September 1989	ISBN 0-385-29782-3/ISBN 978-0-385-29782-0	Illustrations by Debbe Heller.
Moving Target	Fawcett Juniper Books	September 1989	ISBN 0-449-70324-X/ISBN 978-0-449-70324-3	Co-written with Dennis Freeland.
Home Alone	Scholastic	January 1991	ISBN 0-590-44668-1/ISBN 978-0-590-44668-6	Novelization of the 1990 20th Century Fox film Home Alone.
The Diving Bell	Scholastic	May 1992	ISBN 0-590-44620-7/ISBN 978-0-590-44620-4	
Honey, I Blew Up the Kid	Scholastic	1992	ISBN 0-590-55362-3/ISBN 978-0-590-55362-9	Novelization of the 1992 Walt Disney Pictures film Honey, I Blew Up the Kid.
Home Alone 2: Lost in New York	Scholastic	November 1992	ISBN 0-590-45717-9/ISBN 978-0-590-45717-0	Novelization of the 1992 20th Century Fox film Home Alone 2: Lost in New York.
The Good Son	Pocket Books	1993	ISBN 0-671-86751-2/ISBN 978-0-671-86751-5	Novelization of the 1993 20th Century Fox film The Good Son.
Hocus Pocus	Disney Press	1993	ISBN 1-56282-373-6/ISBN 978-1-56282-373-3	Novelization of the 1993 Walt Disney Pictures film Hocus Pocus.
Super Mario Bros.	Hyperion Books	1993	ISBN 1-56282-471-6/ISBN 978-1-56282-471-6	Novelization of the 1993 Hollywood Pictures film Super Mario Bros..
Free Willy	Scholastic	July 1993	ISBN 0-590-46756-5/ISBN 978-0-590-46756-8	Novelization of the 1993 Warner Bros. film Free Willy.
Rookie of the Year	The Trumpet Club	September 1993	ISBN 0-440-40910-1/ISBN 978-0-440-40910-6	Novelization of the 1993 20th Century Fox film Rookie of the Year.
The Three Musketeers	Disney Press	1993	ISBN 1-56282-590-9/ISBN 978-1-56282-590-4	Novelization of the 1993 Walt Disney Pictures film The Three Musketeers.
Freaked	The Trumpet Club	October 1993	ISBN 0-440-40908-X/ISBN 978-0-440-40908-3	Novelization of the 1993 20th Century Fox film Freaked.
Addams Family Values	Pocket Books	December 1993	ISBN 0-671-88036-5/ISBN 978-0-671-88036-1	Novelization of the 1993 Paramount Pictures film Addams Family Values.
The Beverly Hillbillies	HarperPaperbacks	1993	ISBN 0-06-100710-2/ISBN 978-0-06-100710-1	Novelization of the 1993 20th Century Fox film The Beverly Hillbillies.
Walt Disney's Lady and the Tramp	Disney Press	1994	ISBN 1-56282-614-X/ISBN 978-1-56282-614-7	Novelization of the 1955 Walt Disney Animation Studios film Lady and the Tramp.
3 Ninjas Kick Back	Scholastic	March 1994	ISBN 0-590-48450-8/ISBN 978-0-590-48450-3	Novelization of the 1994 film 3 Ninjas Kick Back.
Walt Disney's Peter Pan	Disney Press	1994	ISBN 1-56282-640-9/ISBN 978-1-56282-640-6	Novelization of the 1953 Walt Disney Animation Studios film Peter Pan.
The Pagemaster	Scholastic	November 1994	ISBN 0-590-20243-X/ISBN 978-0-590-20243-5	Novelization of the 1994 film The Pagemaster.
Miracle on 34th Street	Scholastic	November 1994	ISBN 0-590-22506-5/ISBN 978-0-590-22506-9	Novelization of the 1994 20th Century Fox film Miracle on 34th Street.
Richie Rich	Scholastic	December 1994	ISBN 0-590-25092-2/ISBN 978-0-590-25092-4	Novelization of the 1994 Warner Bros. film Richie Rich.
Street Fighter	Newmarket Press	December 1994	ISBN 1-557-04224-1/ISBN 978-1-55704-224-8	Novelization of the 1994 Universal Pictures film Street Fighter.
Please Don't Be Mine, Julie Valentine!	Scholastic	January 1995	ISBN 0-590-48153-3/ISBN 978-0-590-48153-3	
Man of the House	Disney Press	March 1995	ISBN 0-7868-4040-4/ISBN 978-0-7868-4040-3	Novelization of the 1995 Walt Disney Pictures film Man of the House.
Tall Tale: The Unbelievable Adventures of Pecos Bill	Disney Press	April 1995	ISBN 0-7868-4011-0/ISBN 978-0-7868-4011-3	Novelization of the 1995 Walt Disney Pictures film Tall Tale.
Free Willy 2: The Adventure Home	Scholastic	July 1995	ISBN 0-590-25227-5/ISBN 978-0-590-25227-0	Novelization of the 1995 Warner Bros. film Free Willy 2: The Adventure Home.
The Amazing Panda Adventure	Scholastic	August 1995	ISBN 0-590-55205-8/ISBN 978-0-590-55205-9	Novelization of the 1995 Warner Bros. film The Amazing Panda Adventure.
Jumanji	Scholastic	December 1995	ISBN 0-590-67910-4/ISBN 978-0-590-67910-7	Novelization of the 1995 TriStar Pictures film Jumanji.
How I Created My Perfect Prom Date.	Simon & Schuster	September 1996	ISBN 0-689-80482-2/ISBN 978-0-689-80482-3	Originally published as Girl Gives Birth to Own Prom Date; later adapted into the film Drive Me Crazy (1999).
Howl-A-Ween		1996		
Hey Dad, Get a Life!	Holiday House	October 1996	ISBN 0-823-41278-4/ISBN 978-0-823-41278-5	
A Horse Called Farmer		1997		
Abe Lincoln for Class President!		1997		
Home Alone 3	Scholastic	December 1997	ISBN 0-590-95712-0/ISBN 978-0-590-95712-0	Novelization of the 1997 20th Century Fox film Home Alone 3.
Kidnap Kids		1998		
Byte Barkley: Secret Agent K-9		1999		
Y2K-9: the Dog Who Saved the World	Scholastic	1999	ISBN 0-439-14247-4	
Drive Me Crazy		1999		
Give a Boy a Gun	Simon & Schuster	2000	ISBN 0-689-84893-5	
Con-Fidence		2002		
Thief of Dreams	Putnam Juvenile	2003	ISBN 0-399-23135-8	
Can't Get There from Here	Simon & Schuster Children's Publishing	2004	ISBN 0-689-84169-8	
Slide or Die	Simon Pulse	2006	ISBN 1-4169-0581-2	
Cheap Shot		2007		
Boot Camp		2007		
Is That A Glow-in-the-Dark Bunny In Your Pillowcase?		2007		
Is That a Sick Cat in Your Backpack?		2007		
Is That A Dead Dog In Your Locker?		2008		
If I Grow Up		2009		
Is That an Angry Penguin in Your Gym Bag?		2009		
Is That an Unlucky Leprechaun in Your Lunch?		2009		
Famous		2011		
Trailer Girl		2013		
Fallout		2013		
No Place		2014		
The Beast of Cretacea		2015		
The Case of the Murderous Young Millionairess		2016		
American Terrorist		2016	ISBN 1-481-46133-8/ISBN 978-1-481-46134-4	Fictional story about two brothers divided against each other during an FBI sting operation. Removed from print.
Price of Duty		2018		
Summer of '69		2019		
The Good War		2021		

=== Other works ===
- "Young Adult Books: Stalking the Teen." Horn Book Magazine, vol. 62, no. 2 (1986, Mar.-Apr.), pp. 236–239.
