= Martin Moszkowicz =

German film producer (born 1958)

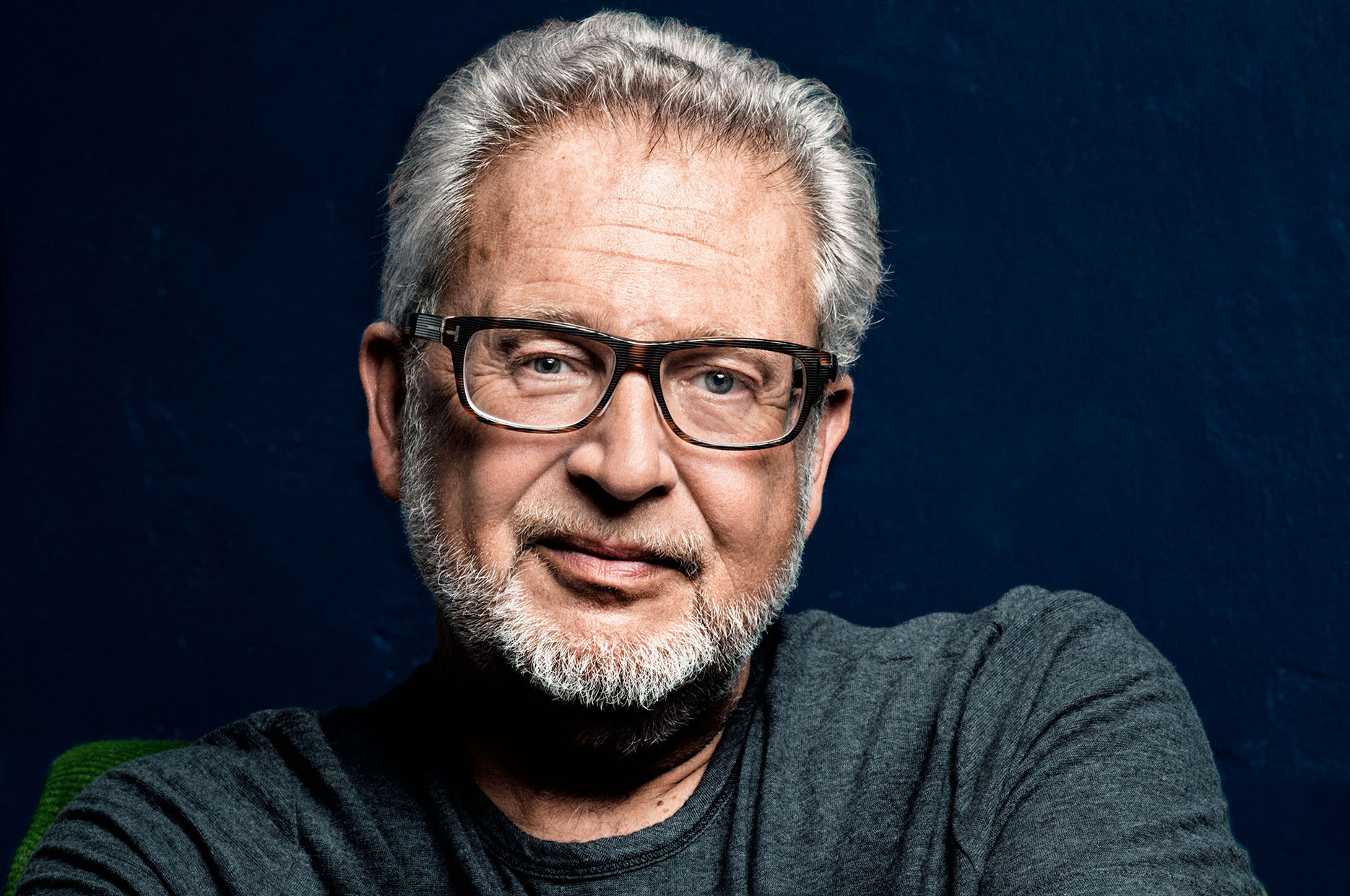
- Born: 25 April 1958 (age 68); Berlin, Germany
- Occupation: Film producer
- Years active: 1980–present

Martin Moszkowicz (born 25 April 1958) is a German film producer. He was the chairman of the executive board at Constantin Film. At his own request, his contract as a chairman ended on February 29, 2024, and he continues to work as a producer from March 1, 2024.

On 6 March 2019, he was appointed honorary professor at University of Television and Film Munich.

In Las Vegas, April 25, 2022, Moszkowicz received CinemaCon “Career Achievement in Film Award” for his work and continuing success at the global box office.

Martin Moszkowicz has been awarded Variety's Billion Dollar Producer Award and Variety's Achievement in International Film.

In recognition of his achievements, Moszkowicz was honored with the Carl Laemmle Producer Award on May 16, 2024, from the Alliance of German Producers — Film & Television and the city of Laupheim, Germany.

On December 18th 2024 Martin Moszkowicz was included for the eight consecutive year in the Variety500 an index of the 500 most influential business leaders shaping the global media industry. Since 1 January 2026, Moszkowicz has been managing director (Geschäftsführer) of TES Transcontinental Entertainment Studios, a Munich-based production company through which he develops and produces film and television projects as an independent producer.

In May 2026, Moszkowicz entered a partnership with Philipp Keel, publisher of the Swiss publishing house Diogenes, to adapt titles from the publisher's catalogue as films and series.

Zurich Film Festival Appoints German Producer Martin Moszkowicz as President as of July 1 2026

As producer, executive producer, and co-producer Moszkowicz has been involved in well over 300 nationally and internationally successful feature films and numerous television shows. Some of his projects include: Resident Evil: The Final Chapter, Fack ju Göhte 3, This Crazy Heart, How About Adolf?, Polar, The Collini Case, The Silence, The Perfect Secret, Dragon Rider, and Monster Hunter.

== Filmography ==
- 1980: Inflation im Paradies (directed by Nikolai Müllerschön) - Producer
- 1982: Der Fan (directed by Eckhart Schmidt) - Producer
- 1983: Rote Rosen für ein Callgirl (directed by Bobby A. Suarez) - Producer
- 1983: Das Gold der Liebe (directed by Eckhart Schmidt) - Producer
- 1983: The Revolt of Job (directed by Imre Gyöngyössy, Barna Kabay) - Co-Producer
- 1984: Ein irres Feeling (directed by Nikolai Müllerschön) - Producer
- 1984: Der Havarist (directed by Wolf-Eckhart Bühler) - Executive Producer
- 1984: Anna's Mother (directed by Burkhard Driest) - Executive Producer
- 1984: No Time to Die (a.k.a. Hijacked to Hell, directed by Helmut Ashley) - Executive Producer
- 1985: Alpha City (directed by Eckhart Schmidt) - Producer
- 1985: Orfeo (directed by Claude Goretta) - Producer
- 1985: Die Küken kommen (directed by Eckhart Schmidt) - Producer
- 1987: Hatschipuh (directed by Ulrich König) - Producer
- 1988: The Venus Trap (directed by Robert van Ackeren) - Producer
- 1990: Rosamunde (directed by Egon Günther) - Co-Producer
- 1991: Manta, Manta (directed by Wolfgang Büld) - Producer
- 1991: Salt on Our Skin (directed by Andrew Birkin) - Producer
- 1992: Ein Fall für TKKG: Drachenauge (directed by Ulrich König) - Executive Producer
- 1993: The Cement Garden (directed by Andrew Birkin) - Executive Producer
- 1993: Mr. Bluesman (directed by Sönke Wortmann) - Co-Producer
- 1993: Body of Evidence (directed by Uli Edel)
- 1993: The House of the Spirits (directed by Bille August) - Co-Producer
- 1994: Der bewegte Mann (directed by Sönke Wortmann) - Executive Producer
- 1994: Voll normaaal (directed by Ralf Hüttner) - Executive Producer
- 1996: The Superwife (directed by Sönke Wortmann) - Producer
- 1996: A Girl Called Rosemary (TV, directed by Bernd Eichinger) - Executive Producer
- 1996: Teenage Wolfpack (TV, directed by Urs Egger) - Co-Producer
- 1996: Charley's Aunt (TV, directed by Sönke Wortmann) - Executive Producer
- 1997: Smilla's Sense of Snow (directed by Bille August) - Producer
- 1997: Babes' Petrol (directed by Peter F. Bringmann) - Producer
- 1997: Prince Valiant (directed by Anthony Hickox) - Co-Executive Producer
- 1997: Ballermann 6 (directed by Gernot Roll / Tom Gerhardt) - Producer
- 1997: It Happened in Broad Daylight (TV, directed by Nico Hofmann) - Executive Producer
- 1997: Der Campus (directed by Sönke Wortmann) - Producer
- 1998: Opernball (TV, directed by Urs Egger) - Producer
- 1998: Am I Beautiful? (directed by Doris Dörrie) - Producer
- 1998: Wrongfully Accused (directed by Pat Proft) - Executive Producer
- 1999: The Devil and Ms. D (directed by Bernd Eichinger) - Co-Producer
- 1999: Hausmeister Krause – Ordnung muss sein (TV series, directed by Tom Gerhardt, Hermann Weigel) - Producer
- 2000: Time Share (directed by Sharon von Wietersheim)
- 2000: Ants in the Pants (directed by Marc Rothemund) - Co-Producer
- 2000: Erkan & Stefan (directed by Michael Herbig) - Co-Producer
- 2000: The Calling (directed by Richard Caesar) - Producer
- 2000: No More School (directed by Marco Petry)
- 2000: The Mists of Avalon (TV, directed by Uli Edel)
- 2000: Slap Her... She's French (directed by Melanie Mayron)
- 2000: Thema Nr. 1 (directed by Maria Bachmann)
- 2001: Vera Brühne (TV, directed by Hark Bohm) - Executive Producer
- 2001: Nowhere in Africa (directed by Caroline Link) - Co-Producer
- 2001: Der Schuh des Manitu (directed by Michael Herbig)
- 2001: Mädchen, Mädchen (directed by Dennis Gansel)
- 2001: Erkan und Stefan gegen die Mächte der Finsternis (directed by Axel Sand) - Co-Producer
- 2001: Sass (directed by Carlo Rola) - Executive Producer
- 2001: More Ants in the Pants (directed by Granz Henman) - Executive Producer
- 2004: Resident Evil: Apocalypse (directed by Alexander Witt) - Executive Producer
- 2004: Downfall (directed by Oliver Hirschbiegel)
- 2005: The Fisherman and His Wife (directed by Doris Dörrie) - Executive Producer
- 2005: The White Masai (directed by Hermine Huntgeburth) - Executive Producer
- 2006: Perfume: The Story of a Murderer (directed by Tom Tykwer) - Executive Producer
- 2006: Hui Buh: The Goofy Ghost (directed by Sebastian Niemann) - Co-Producer
- 2006: DOA: Dead or Alive (directed by Corey Yuen) - Executive Producer
- 2006: Atomised (directed by Oskar Roehler) - Executive Producer
- 2006: Heavyweights (directed by Marcus H. Rosenmüller) - Co-Producer
- 2006: The Robber Hotzenplotz (directed by Gernot Roll)
- 2007: Why Men Don't Listen and Women Can't Read Maps (directed by Leander Haußmann) - Executive Producer
- 2007: Resident Evil: Extinction (directed by Russell Mulcahy) - Executive Producer
- 2007: Pornorama (directed by Marc Rothemund) - Executive Producer
- 2007: Herr Bello (directed by Ben Verbong) - Executive Producer
- 2007: Neues vom Wixxer (directed by Cyrill Boss, Philipp Stennert)
- 2007: Military Academy (directed by Granz Henman)
- 2008: The Baader Meinhof Complex (directed by Uli Edel) - Executive Producer
- 2008: A Year Ago in Winter (directed by Caroline Link) - Producer
- 2008: The Wave (directed by Dennis Gansel) - Co-Producer
- 2008: A Woman in Berlin (directed by Max Färberböck) - Executive Producer
- 2008: Freche Mädchen (directed by Ute Wieland) - Executive Producer
- 2008: Urmel voll in Fahrt (directed by Reinhard Kloos, Holger Tappe) - Executive Producer
- 2009: Die Perlmuttfarbe (directed by Marcus H. Rosenmüller) - Co-Producer
- 2009: Effi Briest (directed by Hermine Huntgeburth) - Executive Producer
- 2009: Männersache (directed by Gernot Roll, Mario Barth) - Executive Producer
- 2009: The Crocodiles (directed by Christian Ditter) - Co-Producer
- 2009: Wedding Fever in Campobello (directed by Neele Vollmar) - Co-Producer
- 2009: Pandorum (directed by Christian Alvart) - Executive Producer
- 2009: Pope Joan (directed by Sönke Wortmann) - Producer
- 2009: The Murder Farm (directed by Bettina Oberli) - Co-Producer
- 2009: Vicky the Viking (directed by Michael Herbig) - Executive Producer
- 2009: Dinosaurier – Gegen uns seht ihr alt aus! (directed by Leander Haußmann) - Executive Producer
- 2010: Zeiten ändern dich (directed by Uli Edel) - Executive Producer
- 2010: The Crocodiles Strike Back (directed by Christian Ditter) - Co-Producer
- 2010: The Hairdresser (directed by Doris Dörrie) - Executive Producer
- 2010: Here Comes Lola! (directed by Franziska Buch) - Co-Producer
- 2010: Tiger Team: The Mountain of the 1000 Dragons (directed by Peter Gersina) - Executive Producer
- 2010: Freche Mädchen 2 (directed by Ute Wieland) - Executive Producer
- 2010: Resident Evil: Afterlife 3D (directed by Paul W. S. Anderson) - Executive Producer
- 2010: Benvenuti al Sud (directed by Luca Miniero) - Co-Producer
- 2010: Die Superbullen (directed by Gernot Roll) - Executive Producer
- 2010: Animals United (directed by Reinhard Kloos, Holger Trappe) - Executive Producer
- 2011: Francesco e il Papa (documentary) (directed by Ciro Cappellari) - Executive Producer
- 2011: Werner – Eiskalt! (directed by Gernot Roll) - Executive Producer
- 2011: The Three Musketeers (directed by Paul W. S. Anderson) - Executive Producer
- 2011: Carnage (directed by Roman Polanski) - Co-Producer
- 2011: Vicky and the Treasure of the Gods (directed by Christian Ditter) - Executive Producer
- 2012: Blutzbrüdaz (directed by Özgür Yıldırım) - Executive Producer
- 2012: Bliss (directed by Doris Dörrie) - Executive Producer
- 2012: Turkish for Beginners (directed by Bora Dağtekin) - Executive Producer
- 2012: Der Bernd (Dokumentation) (directed by Carlos Gerstenhauer) - Producer
- 2012: Das Hochzeitsvideo (directed by Sönke Wortmann) - Executive Producer
- 2012: Resident Evil: Retribution (directed by Paul W. S. Anderson) - Executive Producer
- 2012: Heiter bis Wolkig (directed by Marco Petry) - Executive Producer
- 2012: Agent Ranjid rettet die Welt (directed by Michael Karen) - Co-Producer, Executive Producer
- 2013: Famous Five 2 (directed by Mike Marzuk) - Co-Producer
- 2013: Windstorm (directed by Katja von Garnier) - Co-Producer
- 2013: The Mortal Instruments: City of Bones (directed by Harald Zwart) - Executive Producer
- 2013: 3096 Days (directed by Sherry Hormann) - Producer
- 2013: Fack ju Göhte (directed by Bora Dağtekin) - Executive Producer
- 2014: Tarzan 3D (directed by Reinhard Kloos) - Executive Producer
- 2014: Pompeii (directed by Paul W. S. Anderson) - Executive Producer
- 2014: Famous Five 3 (directed by Mike Marzuk) - Co-Producer
- 2014: Therapy Crashers (directed by Anno Saul) - Executive Producer
- 2014: Wrecked (directed by Sönke Wortmann) - Executive Producer
- 2014: Love, Rosie (directed by Christian Ditter) - Executive Producer
- 2014: The Man Cave (directed by Franziska Meyer Price) - Executive Producer
- 2015: Frau Müller muss weg! (directed by Sönke Wortmann) - Executive Producer
- 2015: Famous Five 4 (directed by Mike Marzuk) - Co-Producer
- 2015: Windstorm 2 (directed by Katja von Garnier) - Co-Producer
- 2015: Fack ju Göhte 2 (directed by Bora Dağtekin) - Executive Producer
- 2015: Look Who's Back (directed by David Wnendt) - Executive Producer
- 2015: Bruder vor Luder (directed by Heiko and Roman Lochmann, co-directed by Tomas Erhart) - Executive Producer
- 2016: Shadowhunters (TV series) - Producer
- 2016: Gut zu Vögeln (directed by Mira Thiel) - Executive Producer
- 2016: Verrückt nach Fixi (directed by Mike Marzuk) - Co-Producer
- 2017: Resident Evil: The Final Chapter (directed by Paul W. S. Anderson) - Executive Producer
- 2017: Timm Thaler oder Das verkaufte Lachen (directed by Andreas Dresen) - Executive Producer
- 2017: Tiger Girl (directed by Jakob Lass) - Executive Producer
- 2017: Axolotl Overkill (directed by Helene Hegemann) - Executive Producer
- 2017: Godless Youth (directed by Alain Gsponer) - Executive Producer
- 2017: Windstorm 3: Windstorm and the Wild Horses (directed by Katja von Garnier) - Co-Producer
- 2017: Tigermilch (directed by Ute Wieland) - Executive Producer
- 2017: Teenosaurus Rex (directed by Leander Haußmann) - Executive Producer
- 2017: Fack ju Göhte 3 (directed by Bora Dağtekin) - Executive Producer
- 2017: This Crazy Heart (directed by Marc Rothemund) - Producer
- 2018: Only God Can Judge Me (directed by Özgur Yildrim) - Co-Producer
- 2018: Verpiss Dich, Schneewittchen (directed by Cüneyt Kaya) - Executive Producer
- 2018: Asphaltgorillas (directed by Detlev Buck) - Executive Producer
- 2018: The Famous Five and the Valley of Dinosaurs (directed by Mike Marzuk) - Co-Producer
- 2018: How About Adolf? (directed by Sönke Wortmann) - Executive Producer
- 2019: Polar (directed by Jonas Akerlund) - Executive Producer
- 2019: Windstorm 4: Ari's Arrival (directed by Theresa von Eltz) - Co-Producer
- 2019: The Collini Case (directed by Marco Kreuzpaintner) - Executive Producer
- 2019: The Silence (directed by John R. Leonetti) - Executive Producer
- 2019: Die Drei !!! (directed by Viviane Andereggen) - Executive Producer
- 2019: Eine ganz heiße Nummer 2.0 (directed by Rainer Kaufmann) - Co-Producer
- 2019: The Perfect Secret (directed by Bora Dağtekin) - Executive Producer
- 2019: Berlin, Berlin (directed by Franziska Meyer Price) - Co-Producer
- 2020: Dragon Rider (directed by Tomer Eshed) - Executive Producer
- 2020: Haven – Above Sky (directed by Tim Fehlbaum) - Executive Producer
- 2020: Monster Hunter (directed by Paul W. S. Anderson) - Executive Producer
- 2021: Resident Evil: Welcome to Raccoon City - Executive Producer
- 2023: Sun and Concrete (directed by David Wnendt) - Executive Producer
- 2024: Chantal im Märchenland (directed by Bora Dağtekin) - Executive Producer
- 2024: Hagen (directed by Cyrill Boss and Philipp Stennert) - Executive Producer
