= Fly Me Away =

Fly Me Away may refer to:

- "Fly Me Away" (song), a 2006 song by Goldfrapp
- Fly Me Away (film), a 2021 French-Italian comedy-drama film
