= Civis Media Prize =

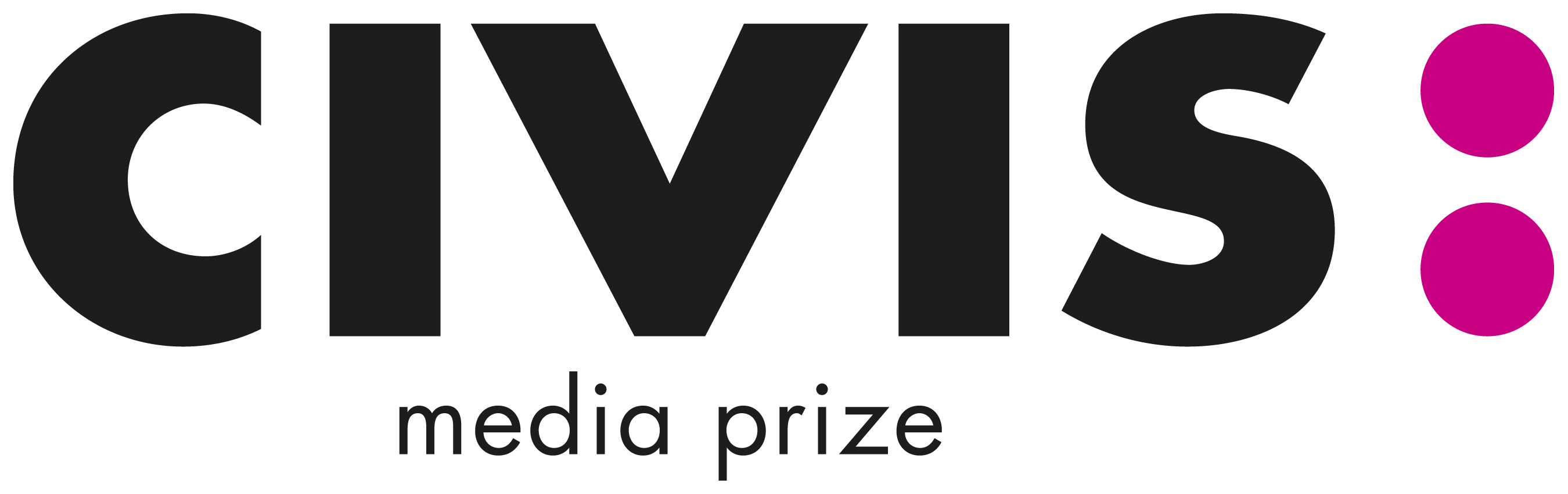
Logo

The CIVIS Media Prize for Integration and Cultural Diversity in Europe, or CIVIS Media Prize for short, was founded in 1987 by the Federal Government Commissioner for Foreigners' Issues together with ARD, under the responsibility of Westdeutscher Rundfunk and the Freudenberg Foundation. The CIVIS Media Prize is organised and implemented by the non-profit CIVIS Media Foundation.

== Organiser ==
The CIVIS Media Prize is organised by the Association of Public Broadcasting Corporations in the Federal Republic of Germany (ARD), represented by WDR, together with the Freudenberg Foundation. ORF, SRG SSR, ARTE, 3sat, phoenix, Deutsche Welle, Deutschlandradio and EBU are media partners. The WDR mediagroup, the German Producers Alliance - Film & Television, VFF - Verwertungsgesellschaft der Film- und Fernsehproduzenten and the European Union Agency for Fundamental Rights (FRA), the Open Society Foundations and the Deutsche Postcode Lotterie are cooperation partners.

The CIVIS Media Prize is implemented by the non-profit CIVIS Media Foundation with the aim of raising awareness of integration and cultural diversity among radio and television programme makers and promoting an innovative and professional approach to developments in the European immigration society. The organisation aims to contribute to intercultural understanding and European integration through the work of the electronic media.

The chairman of the Board of Trustees of the CIVIS Media Foundation is the director general of Westdeutscher Rundfunk, Tom Buhrow. The members of the Board of Trustees, through their activities in civil society, aim to promote the foundation's objectives in the public sphere. The chair of the CIVIS Programme Advisory Board is Jona Teichmann, Programme Director Deutschlandradio.

== Competition ==
The CIVIS Media Prize is awarded as a European television prize and as a radio prize for German-language programmes in the European Union and Switzerland. In addition, the Young CIVIS Media Prize has been awarded since 2004 to young journalists, as well as students and graduates of film and media schools who are no older than 32. The CIVIS Media Prize and the Young CIVIS Media Prize are endowed. The CIVIS Online Prize has been awarded since 2010. The prize honours journalistic internet content dealing with issues of integration and cultural diversity and presented in a web-friendly graphic and multimedia format. The CIVIS Online Prize is also endowed. Other prizes include the CIVIS Television Prize for magazine programmes and the CIVIS Cinema Prize.

In 2005 and 2006, the European Roma Television Prize was also awarded. In 2008, the CIVIS Media Prize for Integration and Cultural Diversity honoured radio and television reports on the integration of immigrants in companies and their everyday working lives for the first time with the CIVIS Business Prize.

All programme contributions meeting the entry conditions and submitted to the CIVIS Media Foundation within the competition period are eligible to compete for the CIVIS Media Prize.

The international CIVIS Media Prize is awarded each year. The award ceremony will be broadcast live on the Internet. ARD and other television stations will broadcast the award ceremony.

== Award winner ==
=== 1988 ===
Television

- CIVIS Television Award - Featured Contributions: Tatort - Voll auf Haß, NDR, Winner: Bernhard Schadewald, Germany
- CIVIS Television Prize - Feature film section: Sinan Ohneland. Memo, mein Vater (Part 1), SFB, Winner: Yasemin and Izzet Akay, Germany
- CIVIS Television Award - entries over 10 minutes in length: Miterlebt: Türkiyem - Fußballheimat in der Fremde, SFB, winner: Andreas Witte, Germany
- CIVIS Television Award - Special prize for special programme achievements: Impetus: Kinder-Bambini-Cockuklar, ZDF, Winners: Simone Emmelius and Horst Werner, Germany

=== 1989 ===
Television

- CIVIS Television Award - Information section: Roma in Köln, WDR, winner: Uli Veith, Germany
- CIVIS Television Award - Feature programmes: Drachenfutter, ZDF, winner: Jan Schütte, Germany
- CIVIS Television Award - Special prize for special programme achievements: Drachenfutter, ZDF, winner: Bhasker Patel and Ric Young, main actors of the film, Germany
- CIVIS Television Award - Special Award for Special Programme Achievement: Hürdenlauf - Der Weg zum deutschen Pass, HR, Winner: Kamil Taylan, Germany

Radio

- CIVIS Radio Award - Information section: Merhaba - Welcome to Radio Dortmund International, prizewinners: Levent Aktoprak and Monika Gotthold, deputy editors for the WDR regional studio Dortmund/Local Radio with their freelance colleagues, Germany
- CIVIS Radio Prize - Radio Drama section, Feature: Experience of Germany - a Chilean asylum seeker says goodbye, Radio Bremen, winner: Christian Cortés, Germany
- CIVIS Radio Prize - special prize for special programme achievements: I have only worn this star since I realised that I am a foreigner. Young Turkish woman protests with Star of David against hatred of foreigners, SFB, Award winners: Andreas Lohse and Sahra Fee, Germany
- CIVIS Radio Prize - special prize for special programme achievements: Alltagskonflikte - Mit so einem gehst Du? - German-Turkish love, WDR, winner: Ute Remus, Germany

=== 1990 ===
Television

- CIVIS Television Award - Information section: Sinti and Roma in Berlin a different, more beautiful life, Rias-TV, winner: Andrea Schmelzer, Germany
- CIVIS Television Award - Entertainment section: Doppelpunkt: Mein Land, Dein Land - ist Deutschland nur für Deutsche da?, ZDF, prizewinners: Michael Steinbrecher and Steffen Bayer, Germany
- CIVIS Television Prize - Feature programme section: Farewell to Paradise, ZDF, winner: Tevfik Başer, Germany
- CIVIS Television Award - Special award for special programme achievements: Es gibt mich noch, WDR, Winner: Klaus Antes, Germany
- CIVIS Television Award - Special award for special programme achievements: Night Studio series: Foreigners, ARD, winner: Klaus Lackschewitz, deputy for the ARD film editorial team, Germany

Radio

- CIVIS Radio Award - Entertainment section: Radio Münsterland unterwegs, WDR, award winners: Dagmar Böhme-Jasper and Holger Hülsmeyer, Germany
- CIVIS Radio Prize - Entertainment category: Radio unfrisiert: Die Deutschen - Portrait von Ausländern gezeichnet, HR, Winners: Volker Bernius and Ursula Dziela, Germany
- CIVIS Radio Prize - Radio Drama, Feature: Walled in, Radio Bremen, Winner: Jürgen Alberts, Germany
- CIVIS Radio Prize - special prize for special programme achievements: Eurohymne, BR, prizewinners: Ulrich Bassenge and Herbert Kapfer, Germany

=== 1991 ===
Television

- CIVIS Television Award - Information category: Doppelpunkt vor Ort: Das Schlimmste verhindern, ZDF, winner: Dietmar Westenberger, Germany
- CIVIS Television Award - Entertainment: Die Sendung mit der Maus, WDR, SWF, SR, winner: Enrico Platter, deputy for the editorial group for children's programmes, Germany
- CIVIS Television Award - Feature Programmes: Yasemin, ZDF, winner: Hark Bohm, Germany
- CIVIS Television Award - special prize for special programme achievements: Der türkische Tag, ZDF, winner: Dieter Stolte, deputy for ZDF, Germany

Radio

- CIVIS Radio Prize - Entertainment category: Turkish songs about foreign countries, WDR, winner: Hüseyin Erdem, Germany
- CIVIS Radio Prize - Radio Drama, Feature: The view of the stranger. Neighbourhood with Foreigners, WDR, winner: Irene Dänzer-Vanotti, Germany
- CIVIS Radio Prize - special prize for special programme achievements: Toucher le son - Touching the sound. African sounds in Paris, SFB, winner: Ursula Weck, Germany

=== 1992 ===
Television

- CIVIS Television Award - Information section: Zum Beispiel Berlin. On dealing with xenophobia, WDR, award winners: Felix Kuballa, Gert Monheim, Yoash Tatari and Peter Schran, Germany
- CIVIS Television Award - Entertainment section: 110 Grad - das junge Magazin: Ausländer in Deutschland, RIAS-TV/Deutsche Welle, winner: Ille Simon, Germany
- CIVIS Television Award - Featured programmes: Karfunkel: Ich bin ein Kanake, ZDF, winner: Thomas Draeger, Germany
- CIVIS Television Award - special award for special programme achievements: Fremde Heimat, 3sat, Winner: Editorial team Das kleine Fernsehspiel, Germany
- Radio
- CIVIS Radio Prize - Information category: Foreigners, 5-part series, SWF3, winner: Michael Hertle, Germany
- CIVIS Radio Award - Entertainment: Ich bin ein Ausländer Rockfestival gegen Ausländerfeindlichkeit, SFB, winner: Jugendwelle Radio 4, Germany
- CIVIS Radio Prize - Radio Play, Feature: Radio play competitions, Heimat oder Fremde. Geschichten aus dem Migrantenleben - Brücke zwischen zwei Kulturen, WDR, prizewinner: Italian editorial team and radio play programme group, Germany
- CIVIS Radio Prize - special prize for special programme achievements: Reading: Letter to Europe, ORB, Winner: Said, Germany

=== 1993 ===
Television

- CIVIS Television Award - Information category: Heiterblick, Roma in Sachsen, MDR, prizewinners: Kerstin Mempel and Hendrik Flemming, Germany
- CIVIS Television Award - Entertainment: Scheibenwischer, SFB, Winner: Dieter Hildebrandt, Germany
- CIVIS Television Award - Entertainment category: Wir gegen Rassismus - Kumpel Anton, RTL, RTL employee initiative and commercial, winner: RTL employees, Germany
- CIVIS Television Award - Special prize for special programme achievements: He who sows violence... Von Biedermännern und Brandstiftern, WDR, Winner: Gert Monheim, Germany
- CIVIS Television Award - Special prize for special programme achievements: Commentaries on the arson attack in Solingen, ARD, award winners: Aysim Alpmann, Klaus Bednarz, Fritz Pleitgen, WDR and Georg Hafner, HR, Germany

Radio

- CIVIS Radio Prize - Information section: On the road in Germany. With the asylum seekers in Weilerswist, Deutsche Welle, winner: Simone Sitte, Germany
- CIVIS Radio Prize - Entertainment category: Riff. German-foreign love stories, WDR, winner: Sefa İnci Suvak, Germany
- CIVIS Radio Prize - Radio Drama, Feature: Dreck, WDR, Winners: Robert Schneider and Norbert Schaeffer, Germany
- CIVIS Radio Prize - Special prize for special programme achievements: Europawerkstatt, WDR, Winners: Authors and Editors, Germany

=== 1994 ===
Television

- CIVIS Television Award - Information section: The city belongs to us. Right-wing violence in Schwedt, ORB, prizewinners: Gesine Enwaldt and Enrico Demurray, Germany
- CIVIS Television Award - Entertainment category: Schwarzfahrer, various broadcasters, winner: Pepe Danquart, Germany
- CIVIS Television Award - Feature films: Happy Birthday, Türke!, ZDF, winner: Doris Dörrie, Germany
- CIVIS Television Award - Special prize for special programme achievements: Initiative Media against Racism, initiators: CIVIS Award winner 1993, Germany
- CIVIS Youth Jury Prize: Then just with violence, ZDF, winner: Rainer Kaufmann, Germany

Radio

- CIVIS Radio Prize - Information section: Bosnic family from Hanau, HR, winner: Anica Falica, Germany
- CIVIS Radio Prize - Entertainment category: With Zurna and Soul. Turkish Rap in Germany, DLF, Winner: Michael Frank, Germany
- CIVIS Radio Prize - Radio Drama, Feature: Roma heißt Menschen - 12 Millionen Sinti und Roma leben in Europa, WDR, Winner: Monika Siegfried-Hagenow, Germany
- CIVIS Radio Prize - special prize for special programme achievements: Peter, my friend, ORB, winner: Miriam Loewy, Germany

=== 1995 ===
Television

- CIVIS Television Award - Information category: Menschen hautnah: Kumpel Charly, WDR, winner: Imad Karim, Germany
- CIVIS Television Award - Entertainment: Programme series Karfunkel, ZDF, Winners: Omar Saavedra Santis and Alejandro Quintana, Germany
- CIVIS Television Award - Feature Programmes: A Song for Beko, WDR/ARTE, Winner: Nizamettin Aric, Germany
- CIVIS Television Award - special prize for special programme achievements: Auf Wiedersehen im Himmel - Die Kinder von der St. Josefspflege, SWF, Winners: Michail Krausnick, Romani Rose and Anita Awosusi, Germany
- CIVIS Youth Jury Prize: Menschen hautnah: Zweimal Deutschland - Kumpel Charly und der Spätzletürke, WDR, winners: Imad Karim, Sabine Stamer, Cem Özdemir and Charly Osafo-Katanka, Germany

Radio

- CIVIS Radio Prize - Information section: The Power of Reconciliation. A visit to Mevlüde Genc, WDR, winner: Sefa İnci Suvak, Germany
- CIVIS Radio Prize - Entertainment section: Kein schöner Land - Nachtgespräche eines chinesischen Publizisten mit Kurt Tucholsky, SDR, winner: Shi Ming, Germany
- CIVIS Radio Award - Radio Drama, Feature: Johanna von der U-Bahn, ORB, Winner: Vidosav Stevanović, Germany
- CIVIS Radio Prize - Special prize for special programme achievements: Multikulti, SFB, Winner: Editorial team SFB 4, Germany

=== 1996 ===
Television

- CIVIS Television Award - Information section: Under German Roofs: Repressed, Forgotten, Sold. In the Vietnamese Ghetto of Berlin, Radio Bremen, Winners: Michael Möller and Marc Wiese, Germany
- CIVIS Television Award - Entertainment section: Alles ist gut, WDR/NDR, Winners: Vadim Spiwak and Jurij Chaschtschewatski, Germany
- CIVIS Television Award - Feature film: Graduating class 1995 - Your own life, La Sept/ARTE, winners: Romain Goupil and Sabrina Houicha, France
- CIVIS Television Award - Special prize for special programme achievements: Aufbruch - Die Kraft der Einwanderer, ZDF/3sat, Winner: Reinhard Kahl, Germany
- CIVIS Youth Video Competition: 2nd place: ‘Last Train To Unity’, Medienzentrum Ruhr e. V., Essen & student group Gesamtschule Bockmühle Essen

Radio

- CIVIS Radio Prize - Information section: Breaking the Silence, HR, prizewinners: Karen Fuhrmann and Heike Ließmann, Germany
- CIVIS Radio Prize - Radio Drama, Feature: Before my life comes my honour - The odyssey of Hasan Ö., ORB/DLR, Winner: Ingeborg Koch, Germany
- CIVIS Radio Prize - Special prize for special programme achievements: Betthupferl, BR, Winner: Editorial team Betthupferl, Germany

=== 1997 ===
Television

- CIVIS Television Award: Blue Eyed - Blauäugig, 3sat, Winners: Bertram Verhaag and Jane Elliott, Germany
- CIVIS Television Award: Germany in Winter - Kanakistan, ARTE, Winners: Thomas Röschner and Feridun Zaimoglu, Germany
- CIVIS Television Award: November Elegy. Isang Yun in memoriam, SFB/KBS, Winner: Barrie Gavin, Germany
- CIVIS Youth Jury Prize: Blue Eyed - Blauäugig, 3sat, Winners: Bertram Verhaag and Jane Elliott, Germany

Radio

- CIVIS Radio Prize: Abgeschoben, Radio Bremen and Auf der Flucht, DLR Berlin, winner: Margot Overath, Germany
- CIVIS Radio Prize: Jud Süß. The life and suffering of Joseph Süß Oppenheimer, WDR, winner: Hellmut G. Haasis, Germany
- CIVIS Radio Prize: Stirb Desdemona, WDR, winner: Pietro Scanzano, Germany

=== 1998 ===
Television

- CIVIS Television Award - Information category: Genötigt - Taxifahrer auf Flüchtlingsjagd, ORB, Winner: Editorial team of the programme Klartext, Germany
- CIVIS Television Prize - Entertainment: 100 Grad-Jugendmagazin (focus: xenophobia) Deutsche Welle TV/ORB, winner: presenter Steffen Hallaschka, Germany
- CIVIS Television Award - Entertainment category: Tatort: In der Falle, BR, winners: Orkun Ertener and Peter Fratzscher, Germany
- CIVIS Television Award for special programme achievements: Monitor, WDR, Winner: Editorial team, Germany
- CIVIS Youth Jury Prize: Portrait of a Judge, WDR, winner: Norbert Kückelmann, Germany
- CIVIS Youth Video Prize: City without Prejudice, winner: video group of the RAA Schwerin, Germany
- CIVIS Youth Video Award: Quite normal people, Filmclub Schwaan, Germany
- CIVIS Youth Video Award: The sky is blue everywhere, winner: Video group of the RAA Leipzig, Germany

Radio

- CIVIS Radio Prize - Information section: Zukunft unbestimmt - Die Geschichte einer Flucht von Afghanistan nach Deutschland. Ich weiß nicht, was ist mit mir - Ein Jahr mit einer Asylbewerberfamilie, SDR, winner: Christiane Schütze, Germany
- CIVIS Radio Prize - Entertainment section: Career downwards - Eastern European virtuosos in the pedestrian zone, SFB/Radio Bremen, winner: Jadwiga Stawny, Germany
- CIVIS Radio Prize - Radio Drama, Feature: Sir Alfred: Exterritorial, SWF, Winner: Said
- CIVIS Radio Prize - Special prize for special programme achievements: Bax Blubber! - Erdball, WDR, Winner: Ulrike Klausmann, Germany

=== 1999 ===
Television

- CIVS Television Prize - Information section: A Tutsi in Dresden, WDR, Winner: Hansjürgen Hilgert, Germany
- CIVS Television Prize - Information: Auf der Kippe, ZDF, Winner: Andrei Schwartz, Germany
- CIVS Television Prize - Information category: Kennzeichen D, ZDF, winner: Editorial team, Germany
- CIVS Television Award - Entertainment: Asylum for Jesus, WDR, Winners: Wolfgang Minder and Thomas Pfaff, Germany
- CIVIS Youth Jury Prize: Kennzeichen D, ZDF, Winner: Editorial team, Germany
- CIVIS Youth Video Prize: Love, flight and cleanliness: A Roma-German family story, winner: video group of the RAA Schwerin, Germany
- CIVIS Youth Video Award: Auf Grund gesetzt, Winner: Video group of the RAA Schwerin, Germany

Radio

- CIVIS Radio Prize - Information section: Beaten up and forgotten - victims of racist violence in Germany, Radio Multikulti, prizewinners: Andrea Nienhuisen and Anselm Weidner, Germany
- CIVIS Radio Prize - Information section: Now we are the damned Russians - late repatriates in North Rhine-Westphalia, WDR, prizewinner: Monika Siegfried-Hagenow, Germany
- CIVIS Radio Prize - Information section: Das Eigene und das Fremde, SWR, winner: Hans-Volkmar Findeisen, Germany

=== 2000 ===
Television

- European CIVS Television Award - Information category: Muharems resa. SVT, winner: Anita Jekander, Sweden
- German CIVS Television Prize - Information: A man sees brown - In action against East German neo-Nazis. WDR, Winner: Birgit Maria Virnich, Germany
- German CIVS Television Award - Special prize for special programme achievements: We are here, Jews in Germany after 1945, WDR/BR, Winner: Richard Chaim Schneider, Germany
- German CIVS Youth Video Award: Die Hutmacher by Christian Hampe, Dimitri Paas, Helena Ströh, Martina Ebenau, Tassilo Priebisch, Germany
- Special Prize of the CIVS Youth Jury: 6 square metres of new home. Dosto Bernau youth centre, prizewinners: Conny Antes-Aceves, Hermann Bach, Edgar Illge, Lars Knoll and Katja Wodni, Germany

Radio

- German CIVIS Radio Prize - Information section: Im Feindesland. BR, winner: Norbert Joa, Germany
- German CIVIS Radio Prize - Information section: Angermünde and elsewhere. Deutschlandradio Kultur, winner: Anselm Weidner, Germany
- German CIVIS Radio Prize - Special prize for special programme achievements: Das Hörmal. ORB/SFB, prizewinner: Radio Fritz editorial team, Germany

=== 2001 ===
Television

- European CIVIS Television Award - Information category: Werelden: Clean & Dream, IKON TV, Winner: Annemarie van Zweeden, Netherlands
- European CIVIS Television Award - Entertainment: Blood Wedding, MTV Hungarian Television, Winners: Dragan Ristic and János Joka Daróczi, Hungary
- German CIVIS Television Award - Information category: Liebe schwarz-weiss, WDR, winner: Britta Wandaogo, Germany
- German CIVIS Television Award - Entertainment category: Was guckst du?!, SAT1, winner: Kaya Yanar, Germany
- German CIVIS Television Award - special prize for special programme achievements: Nach Hitler, Radikale Rechte rüsten auf, MDR, Winners: Jan Peter, Yury Winterberg, Rainer Fromm, Germany
- German CIVIS Youth Video Award: ‘Under the Skin’ Award winner: Ag Video from Rieden Primary School, Director Egid Spies
- European CIVIS Youth Video Award: Quizas, winner: Mikis Mazarakis and Babak Djampour, Sweden
- European CIVIS Youth Video Award: Droits au but, winners: Fabien Resimont, Olivier Legrain, Lionel Lommel, Caroline Barnich, Xavier Genicot and Aude Rossignol, Belgium

Radio

- German CIVIS Radio Prize - Information category: I Germanesi - An Italian family album from Germany, Deutschlandradio Berlin, winner: Giuseppe Maio, Germany[2]
- German CIVIS Radio Prize - Entertainment category: Are you a Rom or Sinto, or what?, WDR 3, winner: Babette Michel, Germany
- German CIVIS Radio Prize - special prize for special programme achievements: The Foreigner Alphabet: Y wie Yuppie-Auslander, WDR, winner: Pietro Scanzano, Germany

=== 2002 ===
Television

- European CIVIS Television Award - Information: The Red Square: The Rostock Fire Trap, ARD, Winner: Kamil Taylan, Germany
- European CIVIS Television Award - Entertainment: List. (The Letter), TVP, Winner: Denijal Hasanovic, Poland
- German CIVIS Television Award - Information category: Das rote Quadrat: Die Feuerfalle von Rostock, ARD, winner: Kamil Taylan, Germany
- German CIVIS Television Award - Special prizes for special programme achievements: Tödliche Begegnung, programme series, HR, winner: Esther Schapira, Germany
- German CIVIS Youth Video Award: 69 Quarters, winner: Weinheim Youth Video Group, Germany
- European CIVIS Youth Video Award: Tussentijd and Meantime, winners: John Kon Kelei and Nicknora Gongich Chol, Netherlands

Radio

- German CIVIS Radio Prize - Information section: Alles klar, oder was?! Turkish as the new youth language?, HR, winner: Sabine Eichhorst, Germany
- German CIVIS Radio Prize - special prize for a special programme achievement: Lilipuz: Nie wieder!, WDR, winner: Matthias Wegener, Germany

=== 2003 ===
Television

- European CIVIS Television Award - Information category: Die Story: Flucht in den Tod. The Village, the Sea and the Silence, WDR, Winners: Marc Wiese and Karl Hoffmann, Germany
- European CIVIS Television Award - Entertainment: The Kumars at No 42, BBC, Winners: Richard Pinto, Sharat Sardana, Sanjeev Bhaskar, Great Britain
- German CIVIS Television Award - Information category: Planet Hasenbergl - Lichtblicke in der Münchner Bronx, BR, Winner: Claus Strigel, Germany
- German CIVIS Television Award - Entertainment category: Anam, ZDF, winner: Buket Alakuş, Germany

Radio

- German CIVIS Radio Award - Information category: Emergency Call. A Turkish doctor in the neighbourhood, SWR, winner: Maria Consiglia Squillante, Germany
- German CIVIS Radio Prize - Entertainment category: Zeit im Dunkeln, (book: Henning Mankell), NDR, winner: Erik Uddenberg, Germany

=== 2004 ===
Television

- European CIVIS Television Award - Information: New Stars of Europe, Danmarks Radio TV, Winner: Axel Boisen, Denmark
- European CIVIS Television Award - Entertainment: Les filles de Mohamed, Televisío de Catalunya, winner: Sílvia Munt, Spain
- German CIVIS Television Award - Information section: NPD on the rise - How right-wing extremists achieve electoral success in local communities, rbb, award winners: Alexander Kobylinski and Caroline Walter, Germany.
- German CIVIS Television Prize - Entertainment section: Karamuk, WDR, winner: Sülbiye Günar, Germany
- Young CIVIS Media Prize: Himmelfilm - How were skies when you were young?, University of Television and Film Munich, prizewinners: Sanne Kurz and Jiska Rickels, Germany

Radio

- German CIVIS Radio Prize - Information section: Stories from Parallelistan: On the road with young resettlers in Bavaria, BR, winner: Frederik Kunth, Germany
- German CIVIS Radio Prize - Entertainment category: Lilipuz: Papa, was ist der Islam?, WDR, winner: Karlheinz Koinegg, Germany

=== 2005 ===
Television

- European CIVIS Television Award - Information: Nabila, Sveriges Television, Winners: Hakan Berthas and Johan Bjerkner, Sweden
- European CIVIS Television Award - Entertainment: Der Grenzer und das Mädchen, WDR, Winner: Hartmut Schoen, Germany
- German CIVIS Television Award - Information: Deportation at dawn - everyday life at the immigration office, NDR, winner: Michael Richter, Germany
- German CIVIS Television Award - Entertainment: Consequential Damage, SWR/ARTE/BR, Winner: Florian Hanig, Germany
- European ROMA Television Prize: For all my life, Latvian National Television 1, winner: Romualds Pipars, Latvia
- Young CIVIS Media Prize: Weiße Ameisen, Filmakademie Baden-Württemberg, winner: Renate Gosiewski, Germany

Radio

- German CIVIS Radio Prize - Information section: Adrian Fischer: deutsch - schwarz - fremd, MDR, winner: Bastian Wierzioch, Germany

=== 2006 ===
Television

- European CIVIS Television Award - Information: The Right of the Stronger, Arte, Winner: Patric Jean, France
- European CIVIS Television Award - Entertainment: The Experiment - 30 Days Muslim, RTL II, Winner: Silke Pollmeier, Germany
- German CIVIS Television Award - Information: Menschen hautnah: Der Feind im Haus. When children become Nazis, WDR, Winner: Nicola Graef, Germany
- German CIVIS Television Award - Entertainment: Das Experiment - 30 Tage Moslem, RTL II, Winner: Silke Pollmeier, Germany
- European ROMA Television Prize: Gypsies: Europeans without a State, Televisión Española, winner: Pilar Requena, Spain
- Young CIVIS media prize: Ise Kyopos - the 2nd generation of Koreans living abroad, Academy of Media Arts Cologne, winner: Cerin Hong, Germany

Radio

- German CIVIS radio prize for long programmes: Die Kinder der Gastarbeiter, BR, winner: Eleni Torossi, Germany
- German CIVIS Radio Award - short programmes category: Ich bin Papst, WDR Funkhaus Europa, winner: Osman Engin, Germany

=== 2007 ===
Television

- European CIVIS Television Award - Information programmes: Neue Heimat Lindenstraße, SF, winners: Beat Bieri and Ruedi Leuthold, Switzerland
- European CIVIS Television Award - Entertainment category: Teen Scene - Akwasi and Nico, Katholieke Radio Omroep (KRO), winners: Hans Mors and Gert Berg, Netherlands
- German CIVIS Television Award - Information: Germany for Beginners in the series Schlaglicht: Die Welt-Klasse, SWR, winner: Jean Boué, Germany
- German CIVIS Television Award - Entertainment: Türkisch für Anfänger, Episode 1, BR, Winners: Bora Dagtekin, Edzard Onneken and Alban Rehnitz, Germany
- Young CIVIS Media Prize Sona and Her Family, VSMU - Academy of Music and Dramatic Arts/Bratislava, winner: Daniela Rusnoková, Slovak Republic

Radio

- European CIVIS Radio Prize - long programmes section: Close-up: Pogrom in the Province - Of Biedermanns and Arsonists, BR, Winner: Martin Durm, Germany
- European CIVIS Radio Prize - Short Programmes category: Irgendwo dazwischen, rbb, Winners: Ken Jebsen and Susanne Wündisch, Germany

=== 2008 ===
Television

- European CIVIS Television Award - Information section: die story: Todesfahrt im Fischerboot. Africa's refugees and Europe's interests, WDR, Winners: Michael Grytz and Klaus Martens, Germany
- European CIVIS Television Award - Entertainment category: Une histoire à ma fille, France 2, winners: Catherine Borgella and Chantal Picault, France
- German CIVIS Television Award - Information category: Schule der Toleranz - Kinderdemokratie in Tenever, RB, winners: Marianne Strauch and Rainer Kahrs, Germany
- German CIVIS Television Prize - Entertainment: Unter anderen Umständen - Bis dass der Tod euch scheidet, ZDF, Winners: Waltraud Ehrhardt and Peter Obrist, Germany
- Young CIVIS Media Prize: Status: Geduldet, Filmakademie Baden-Württemberg, Winner: Silvana Santamaria, Germany

Radio

- European CIVIS Radio Prize - long programmes category: SWR2 Leben: Mein erstes Wort war Schokolade - Wie ich als Gastarbeiterkind Deutsch gelerntte, SWR, Winner: Hürü Meryem Kök, Germany
- European CIVIS Radio Prize - Short Programmes category: Local time: Berlin needs you! - Integration project for young migrants, Deutschlandradio Kultur, winner: Christina Rubarth, Germany
- European CIVIS Thematic Award 2008 Integration in Business and Industry
- Television: auslandsjournal: Polish Entrepreneur, ZDF, Winner: Sylvia Bleßmann, Germany
- Radio: Café Global: Nicht dumm, nicht blond, nicht deutsch - Erfolgsprofil Ausländer: Bestatter, rbb, winner: Konstantina Vassiliou-Enz, Germany

=== 2009 ===
Television

- European CIVIS Television Award - Information section: True Life: Lampedusa at the door of Europe. MTV Italy, 2008, winner: Gaia Chiti Strigelli.
- European CIVIS Television Award - Entertainment section: White Girl. BBC, 2008, winner: Abi Morgan.
- German CIVIS Television Award - Information category: Die Weggeworfenen. Story of a deportation. ZDF, 2008, Winners: Lutz Ackermann, Anita Blasberg and Marian Blasberg
- German CIVIS Television Award - Entertainment: Welcome to the Westerwald. SWR, 2008, Winners: Beate Langmaack and Tomy Wigand.
- Young CIVIS Media Prize: Sores and Sîrîn. Hamburg Media School, prizewinners: Serkal Kus and Katrin Gebbe.

Radio

- European CIVIS Radio Prize - long programmes section: Audio images: Karntn is lei ans - The story of a deportation. ORF, 2008, prizewinner: Doris Stoisser.
- European CIVIS Radio Prize - short programmes: Live on3radio - The Magazine: Win-Place-Show. On the way to the premiere, part 2. BR, 2008, winner: Zulayat Suli Kurban

=== 2010 ===
Television

- European CIVIS Television Award - Information section: La Cité des Roms. Arte, 2009, winner: Frédéric Castaignède.
- European CIVIS Television Award - Entertainment: Aicha. France 2, 2009, winners: Yamina Benguigui, Dominique Lancelot.
- German CIVIS Television Award - Information category: Rich Brother. ZDF, 2009, Winner: Winner: Insa Onken
- German CIVIS Television Award - Entertainment category: Bülent Ceylan live! RTL, 2009, Winner: Bülent Ceylan
- Young CIVIS Media Prize: Book of Miri. Den Danske Filmskole, winner: Katrine Philp.

Radio

- European CIVIS Radio Prize - long programmes section: Will I become German by singing? A feature on naturalisation. DKultur/NDR/rbb, 2009, prizewinners: Inge Braun, Helmut Huber.
- European CIVIS Radio Prize - short programmes category: A bloody sheet - Your whole future. Of new innocence for one night. rbb, 2009, winner: agdalena Bienert

Online

- European CIVIS Online Prize: Netz gegen Nazis - mit Rat und Tat gegen Rechtsextremismus. Amadeu Antonio Foundation, 2009, authorised representative: Simone Rafael.

=== 2011 ===
Spurce:

Television

- European CIVIS Television Award - Information section: DOK: Der Asylchef und die Nigerianer. SRF, 2010, Winner: Karin Bauer.
- European CIVIS Television Award - Entertainment: Commissioner Wallander - Murderer without a Face. ARD, BBC, 2010, Winner: Richard Cottan.
- German CIVIS Television Award - Information category: Hart und herzlich - Eine türkische Lehrerin gibt nicht auf . WDR, 2010, Winner: Nicole Rosenbach
- German CIVIS Television Award - Entertainment category: Zivilcourage. WDR, 2010, Winner: Jürgen Werner
- Young CIVIS Media Prize: Heimatland. Lucerne School of Art and Design, prizewinners: Loretta Arnold, Fabio Friedli, Marius Portmann and Andrea Schneider

Radio

- European CIVIS Radio Prize - long programmes section: Mein Türke und ich - Integrative Visits in the Neighbourhood. BR, 2010 Winner: Marco Maurer.
- European CIVIS Radio Award - Short Programmes: Radio Essen in the morning: Integration and me. Radio Essen, 2010, Winner: Katja Artsiomenka

Online

- European CIVIS Online Prize: dastandard.at. Winner: Gerlinde Hinterleitner, editor-in-chief

=== 2012 ===
Television

- European CIVIS Television Award - Information section: Film Scene: Our Garden of Eden. SRF, 2011, Winner: Mano Khalil.
- European CIVIS Television Award - Entertainment category: No place like home. VPRO, 2011, Winner: Marius van Duijn.
- German CIVIS Television Award - Information category: Menschen hautnah: Tod einer Richterin - Auf den Spuren von Kirsten Heisig. WDR, 2011, award winner: Güner Yasemin Balci, Nicola Graef
- German CIVIS Television Award - Entertainment section: Salami Aleikum. ZDF, 2011, Award winners: Ali Samadi Ahadi, Arne Nolting
- Young CIVIS Media Prize: No way back. Nederlandse Film en Televisie Academie, winner: Shariff Korver

Radio

- European CIVIS Radio Prize - Long Programmes section: Back to Bosporus. SWR, 2011 Winner: Patrick Batarilo.
- European CIVIS Radio Award - Short Programmes: One summer long ... Summer camp for Roma children in Berlin. Deutschlandradio Kultur, 2011, Winner: Christina Rubarth

Online

- European CIVIS Online Prize: www.cafebabel.com. Winner: Alexandre Heully

=== 2013 ===
Spurce:

Television

- European Civis Television Award - Magazines - short programmes up to 10 minutes: Panorama 3: Foreigners out! Agitation against a refugee centre. NDR, award winners: Djamila Benkhelouf, Anna Orth, Anne Ruprecht.
- European Civis Television Award - Information section: die story: Friedhof der Illegalen. WDR, winner: Andreas Morell.
- European Civis Television Award - Entertainment category: Shameless. TVP, winner: Grzegorz Loszewski.
- German Civis Television Award - Information category: Panorama: From Nestling to Terrorist. NDR, award winners: John Goetz, Djamila Benkhelouf, Anke Hunold, Anna Orth
- German Civis Television Award - Information section: ARTE Theme Evening: The Terror Trio - Why the Authorities Failed, MDR, Inga Klees, Marcus Weller
- German Civis Television Award - Entertainment: Der Tatortreiniger: Schottys Kampf. NDR, Winner: Mizzi Meyer
- Young Civis Media Prize: Bear me. Filmakademie Baden-Württemberg, prizewinners: Kasia Wilk, Anna Matacz

Radio

- European Civis Radio Prize - long programmes section: Private Radio: Farid Vatanparast and his penchant for love props. WDR5, award winners: Andrea Kath, Martina Meißner.
- European Civis Radio Prize - Short Programmes section: Echo der Zeit: Meschugge Party - Jewish Life in Berlin. SRF, Award winner: Casper Selg

Online

- European Civis Online Prize: www.RAPutation-casting.tv. Winners: Anna Mauersberger, Solmaz Sohrabi, Susanne Stürmer

=== 2014 ===
Film

- Civis Cinema Prize for European feature films: Fack ju Göhte. Award winners: Bora Dagtekin, Christian Becker, Lena Schömann and Martin Moszkowicz

Television

- European Civis Television Award - Magazine section - short programmes up to 10 minutes: Small Stories from the Roma World: Hristov family. BNT, Winners: Kremena Budinova, Svetoslav Draganov
- European Civis Television Award - Information section: Mama Illegal. ORF, Winner: Ed Moschitz
- European Civis Television Award - Entertainment: Tatort: Angezählt. ORF, winner: Martin Ambrosch
- German Civis Television Award - Information category: Delivered! Temporary workers at Amazon. HR/ARD, Winners: Peter Onneken, Diana Löbl
- German Civis Television Award - Entertainment: Transfer - The dream of eternal life. ZDF/Arte, award winners: Gerald Klein, Damir Lukačević, Gabi Blauert
- European Young Civis Media Prize: A home for Lydia. KRO-NCRV, Netherlands, winner: Eline Schellekens

Radio

- European Civis Radio Prize - Long Programmes section: Scrubbing against the right. The relentless fight of a pensioner against Nazi slogans. SWR2, award winner: Klaus Schirmer
- European Civis Radio Prize - Short Programmes section: Echo der Zeit: Peaceful coexistence between Roma and Czechs. SRF, award winner: Marc Lehmann

Online

- European Civis Online Media Prize: www.everydayrebellion.net. Winners: Arash T. Riahi, Arman T. Riahi

=== 2015 ===
Film

- Civis Cinema Prize for European feature films: Head Full of Honey. Production: barefoot film, Warner Bross, Award winners: Til Schweiger, Tom Zickler

Television

- European Civis Television Award - Magazine - short programmes up to 10 minutes: Rundschau: Flucht über das Meer, SRF, Winner: Philipp Zahn
- European Civis Television Award - Information: The Trial of Budapest rbb, winner: Eszter Hajdú
- European Civis Television Award - Entertainment: Glasgow Girls. BBC Scotland, Winners: Joe Barton, Brian Welsh and Colin Barr
- European Young Civis Media Prize: Dr Illegal. Don't give a hungry man a fish, give him a fishing rod. Filmakademie Baden-Württemberg, prizewinners: Martin Rohé, Jan Galli and Hadi Khanjanpour

Radio

- European Civis Radio Prize - Long Programmes: radio Topic: All the way only fear of death. The story of an escape to Europe. BR, Winner: Lisa Weiß
- European Civis Radio Prize - Short Programmes: Mittagsjournal: Life after flight. Part 1 Nina Kústurica looks back. Ö1, Award winner: Veronika Mauler
- European Civis Prize of Honour Radio: Oury Jalloh. The contradictory truths of a death case. mdr, award winner: Margot Overath

Online

- European Civis Online Media Prize - Web offerings: www.der-Zaun.net. Winners: Dietmar Telser, Benjamin Stöß
- European Civis Online Media Award - Webvideos: Tarek Chalabi. Winners: Lars Kaempf, Eiko Theermann

=== 2016 ===
Film

- European CIVIS Cinema Award: He's back. Production company: Mythos Film, Director: David Wnendt

Television

- European Civis Television Award - Information: Neuland. Director: Anna Thommen
- European Civis Television Award - Information: EU: On the verge of a crash? Winner: Annalisa Piras
- European Civis Television Award - Entertainment: Leberkäseland. Winner: Nils Willbrandt
- European Young Civis Media Prize: Inland. Winner: Piet Baumgartner
