= Lucas Reiber =

German actor

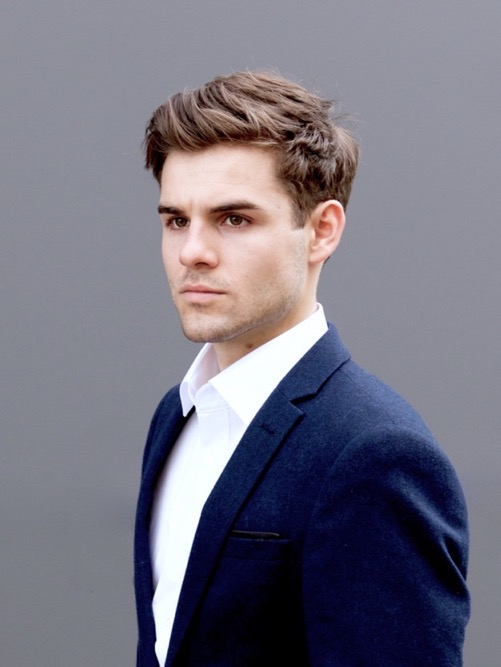
- Reiber, 2016
- Born: Lucas Reiber; October 4, 1993 (age 32); Berlin, Germany
- Occupation: Actor
- Years active: 2006–present

Lucas Reiber (born October 4, 1993) is a German actor. He is best known for his roles in the films Suck Me Shakespeer 2, The Red Band Society and Die Mutter des Mörders, and for portraying Niklas in the television series Binny and the Ghost.

== Biography ==
He was born and raised in Lichterfelde, Berlin before moving to Kreuzberg when he was 14. His mother is Claudia Reiber and he has a sister, Lisa Reiber. His father became a vegan.

Reiber first appeared on stage in 2003 at the age of ten; he impersonated the young Gavroche in the musical Les Misérables at the Theater des Westens. From 2008, he was a member of the "junge Ensemble" (jE) of the Friedrichstadt-Palast, where he studied singing, acting and dance from 2008 to 2011. He took part in several productions there. From 2011 onwards, further acting coachings and singing lessons followed.

In 2009, under the direction of Peter Keglevic, he played his first film role in the two-part television film Ken Follett's Ice Fever (based on Whiteout). He impersonated the teenager Craig alongside Heiner Lauterbach (as Craig's grandfather 'Stanley Oxenford') and Sophie von Kessel (as Craig's mother 'Olga'). In his first feature film, the youth film Rock It! (2010), he played the role of Marc, the keyboarder of the rock band, alongside Maria Ehrich and Emilia Schüle. Before the film, he had keyboard lessons for six years and then got guitar lessons for the film. In 2011, he starred alongside Christian Ulmen in the feature film Someone Like Him; he played the young musician Benny Schmidtbauer.

In the film comedy Fack ju Göhte 2 (2015), Reiber played the role of Etienne ("Ploppi"). a boy with Asperger's Syndrome. In the opinion of Christoph Schröder, Reiber formed "the only ray of hope" in Fack ju Göhte 2 in the weekly newspaper Die Zeit. In 2016, he received together with Anna Lena Klenke, Max von der Groeben and Jella Haase, the Bavarian Film Award.

Reiber then participated in several television films in major and minor roles. In the ZDF channel three-part Hotel Adlon: A Family Saga, he had in the 3rd part of the small role of bellboy Raphael. In the ZDF television comedy Friendship on Hold, he played Henry, the friend of the drug-consuming 17-year-old son of the mayor Bea Westkamp (Johanna Gastdorf).

In the ARD TV movie Sprung ins Leben, he appeared in March 2014, alongside Simone Thomalla, in his first major role on television. He played the talented football player Sebastian, who uses a wheelchair after a car accident. He excelled in his role a "sensitive portrait of a traumatized young people". In the TV two-parter After the Fall (Die Himmelsleiter) in 2015, he played Bruno Zettler, the son of Cologne based black market dealer and former NS - Ortsgruppenleiter Armin Zettler. In the ZDF thriller Die Mutter des Mörders (The mother of the murderer), he had the lead role, on the side of Natalia Wörner. He played Matis, the 20-year-old, mentally handicapped son of the supermarket saleswoman Maria, who comes under suspicion of murder after a violent crime. For his acting performance, he was awarded the 2016 New Faces Award.

Reiber also took over roles in television series. In the third season of the RTL series Doctor's Diary, he played in the scenes with the childhood memories the role of the young Marc Meier, played by Florian David Fitz. In the multi-award-winning Disney series Binny and the Ghost, he was in both seasons as Niklas Neudecker in front of the camera. Two episodes in which he starred as episodes were awarded the 'Goldener Spatz' in 2015. He had further episodes of main roles in the television series Heldt (2013, as paraplegic accident victim Manuel Unterberg) and in Leipzig Homicide (2013, the best friend of a young man who died of an overdose of crystal meth). In January 2017, Reiber was in the ZDF crime series SOKO 5113 (or SOKO Munich) in an episode main role to see; he played Matti Fauser, the ex-boyfriend of a dead youngster tennis player.

In addition to his film career, Reiber occasionally performs in the theater. In March / April 2013, he appeared in the theater on the Kurfürstendamm in Berlin in the role of teenage and half-orphan Jay in the tragicomedy A normal family by Neil Simon. His stage partners were Peggy Lukac (as grandmother) and Chiara Schoras (as Aunt Bella).

Reiber is a member of the Deutsche Filmakademie (German Film Academy).

== Awards ==
- 2016: Bavarian Film Award for Best Young Actor for film Fack Ju Göhte 2
- 2016: Bunte's 'New Faces Award' for Best Newcomer for TV Movie The Mother of the Murderer (or Die Mutter des Mörders)

== Filmography ==
=== Film ===
Year	Title	Role	Notes
2010	Rock It!	Marc	
2011	Klarer Fall für Bär – Gefährlicher Freundschaftsdienst	Benjamin Bielmann	
2011	Someone Like Him	Benny Schmidtbauer	
2011	Warzenputtel	Sid	(Short)
2011	Kinderspiel	Vanessa's Boyfriend	(Short)
2012	Für Elise	Kai	
2012	Lore	German soldier	
2014	Beeke	Frieder	(Short)
2015	Fack ju Göhte 2	Etienne	Known in English as Suck Me Shakespeer 2
2015	Verrückt nach Fixi	Jannis	
2015	Beck's Last Summer	Andy Shevantich	
2017	Fack ju Göhte 3	Etienne	
2017	Hanni & Nanni 4	Ole	
2017	The Invisibles	Jochen Arndt	
2019	Am Ende Legenden	Tom	(filming)

=== Television ===
Year	Title	Role	Notes
2010	Ice Fever	Greg	(TV movie)
2010-2012	Crime.de	Tristan	TV series, 2 episode
2011	Notruf Hafenkante	Lukas	TV series, 1 episode
2011	Doctor's Diary	Marc Meier	TV series, 4 episodes
2011	Klarer Fall für Bär	Benjamin	(TV movie)
2013	The Old Fox	Lukas Kroesinger	TV series, 1 episode
2013	Leipzig Homicide	Jolle Strand	TV series, 1 episode
2013	Heldt	Manuel Unterberg	TV series, 1 episode
2013	Hotel Adlon: A Family Saga	Page Raphael	TV mini-series, 1 episode
2014	Father of Four Sons	Konstantin Bergers	TV series, 1 episode
2014	Sprung ins Leben	Sebastian Jäger	(TV movie)
2014	Friendship on Hold	Henry	(TV movie)
2014-2016	Binny and the Ghost	Niklas Neudecker	TV series, 3 episodes
2015	Prinzessin Maleen	Peter	(TV movie)
2015	Die Mutter des Mörders	Matis / Son	(TV movie)
2015	After the Fall	Bruno Zettler	TV mini-series, 2 episodes
2015-2017	SOKO 5113	Boris Neubert, jung 2015 / Matti Fauser 2017	TV series, 2 episodes
2016	The Red Band Society	Victor	TV series, 4 episodes, series based on Spanish series Polseres vermelles
2016	Der Urbino-Krimi	Fabio Soltare	TV series, 1 episode
2017	Katie Fforde: Bruderherz	Anthony Cahill	(TV movie)
2017	Der Kriminalist	Florian Friedland	TV series, 1 episode
2017	Die Spezialisten - Im Namen der Opfer	Ulf Wiebold (26 J.)	TV series, 1 episode

== Personal life ==
He likes jogging, cycling and playing a lot of volleyball. In 2015, he was living in a shared flat, in Moabit. He believes in sustainability and wears fair trade clothes. In 2018, he was driving an Opel Insignia GS car.
