= Fack ju Göhte =

2013 film directed by Bora Dağtekin

- Theatrical release poster
- Directed by: Bora Dağtekin
- Written by: Bora Dagtekin
- Produced by: Christian Becker; Lena Schömann
- Starring: Elyas M'Barek; Karoline Herfurth
- Cinematography: Christof Wahl
- Edited by: Charles Ladmiral; Zaz Montana
- Music by: Beckmann; Djorkaeff; Beatzarre
- Production companies: Constantin Film; Rat Pack Filmproduktion
- Distributed by: Constantin Film
- Release date: 29 October 2013
- Running time: 118 minutes
- Country: Germany
- Language: German
- Budget: €5 million
- Box office: $82 million

Fack ju Göhte (intentional misspelling of "Fuck you, Goethe") is a 2013 German comedy film directed and written by Bora Dağtekin and starring Elyas M'Barek and Karoline Herfurth, while Max von der Groeben and Jella Haase appear in supporting roles. The film was produced by Rat Pack Filmproduktion in coproduction with Constantin Film.

Fack ju Göthe premiered on 29 October 2013 in Munich, and was released in cinemas on 7 November. It was released in the United States under the title Suck Me Shakespeer.

The film spawned a franchise, with direct sequels Fack ju Göhte 2 (2015) and Fack ju Göhte 3 (2017) and spinoff sequel Chantal in Marchenland (2024).

== Plot ==
Bank robber Zeki Müller has just been let out of prison. Upon his release, he goes to retrieve the money he stole in order to repay a debt, but his friend buried it in a construction site. During Zeki's time in prison, the construction project was completed and his money is now buried beneath the new gymnasium at the Goethe Gesamtschule. In order to obtain the money, Zeki applies for the vacant position of a deceased janitor. However, due to a misunderstanding, he is given a job as a substitute teacher.

Elisabeth "Lisi" Schnabelstedt is a student teacher at the Goethe Gesamtschule, her former high school, because she has guardianship over her younger sister, Laura. Lisi does not impose the necessary authority to manage the students successfully.

When Ingrid Leimbach-Knorr, homeroom teacher of class 10B, attempts suicide, the management of the difficult class goes to Lisi Schnabelstedt, although the class's brutal pranks upon the new teacher quickly reduces her to tears. Zeki takes over as the substitute homeroom teacher for Lisi's former seventh grade class.

In order to regain his money, Zeki works during the night in the cellar of the school on a tunnel leading to the buried money. He also copies Lisi's diploma because he does not have a high school or college education, which eventually becomes known to Lisi. She then blackmails Zeki, allowing her to get her old seventh grade class back while Zeki assumes responsibility over class 10B.

Zeki is thrown out of his living situation at a strip club, and tries to sleep in Lisi's garage. When discovered, Lisi allows Zeki to live in her basement as long as he properly teaches class 10B instead of watching films every class period.

Through unconventional methods and Lisi's soft leadership, Zeki gains the respect of the class. Although Zeki begins his time as a teacher with draconian methods including shooting students with a paintball gun and holding a student underwater, he eventually takes a softer approach and convinces the students that they do not want to become drug dealers and dependent on welfare by taking them on a field trip to visit Zeki's acquaintances who live this lifestyle.

He also becomes more involved in the school by taking over the leadership of the Drama Club, which performs a modern version of Romeo and Juliet, and helping out with the Jugend forscht group. Zeki, concerned about Lisi's image amongst the class, leads the class on an excursion to paint graffiti on a train, during which a student paints the title 'Fack ju Göhte'. As a result of this increased respect, Lisi passes her practical teaching exam with class 10B. In addition, Zeki arranges an affair for Lisi's little sister Laura with her crush Danger, as well as ensuring Lisi's continued legal guardianship of Laura by pretending to be Lisi's serious boyfriend when Laura's social worker comes to visit.

Eventually Zeki finds the money in the tunnel, but the tunnel beneath the gymnasium causes the floor to break and allows Lisi to discover Zeki filling in the tunnel. When Lisi learns about Zeki's past as a criminal, she threatens to call the police if he does not leave his job and her home at once. Zeki, out of options, agrees to drive the get away car for a bank heist. As Zeki's class is about to take their final exam in German, they all take out their motivation photos. A student informs Lisi that Zeki's motivation photo is in his desk. When Lisi opens the desk, she discovers that his motivation for becoming a better person is her. A friend of Zeki's is able to convince that Zeki wants to change his ways for her.

Zeki doesn't follow through with the heist because three students stop him to ask if he will be their homeroom teacher next year and he sees the train with the 'Fack ju Göthe' graffiti. He sends Lisi a dress and an invitation to the prom and reports himself to the school principal. The principal wants to keep him and even hands him a falsified high school diploma with a 2.0 GPA. She informs Zeki that the class 10B has drastically improved and if they continue to work towards their high school diplomas, the school will become the best in the city. Their marks in German, previously 5's and 6's (equivalent to F's), have now become better than 3's (C's).

== Cast ==
- Elyas M'Barek as Zeki Müller
- Karoline Herfurth as Elisabeth 'Lisi' Schnabelstedt
- Katja Riemann as Principal Gudrun Gerster
- Jana Pallaske as Charlie
- Alwara Höfels as Caro Meyer
- Jella Haase as Chantal Ackermann
- Max von der Groeben as Daniel 'Danger' Becker
- Anna Lena Klenke as Laura Schnabelstedt
- Gizem Emre as Zeynep
- Aram Arami as Burak
- Uschi Glas as Ingrid Leimbach-Knorr
- Margarita Broich as Frau Sieberts
- Farid Bang as Paco
- Christian Näthe as Biology teacher
- Bernd Stegemann as Herr Gundlach
- Erdal Yıldız as Attila
- Laura Osswald as Kindergarten teacher

== Production ==
=== Casting ===
The role of Zeki Müller was written by Bora Dağtekin for Elyas M'Barek. M'Barek and Dağtekin had previously worked together on the television series Schulmädchen, Doctor's Diary, Türkisch für Anfänger and its film adaptation. Producer Lena Schömann praised M'Barek for his 'unbelievable discipline', as the actor had worked out five times a week with a personal trainer, losing eight kilos, months before filming began. M'Barek had just trained his upper body for Türkisch für Anfänger.

The main female role was played by Grimme Award winner Karoline Herfurth, who after Mädchen, Mädchen and its 2004 sequel was only seen rarely in comedies. Schömann gave his reasons for Herfurth's choice, stating that she 'has a fantastic instinct for comedy and timing'. The role of school principal went to Katja Riemann, who had just made a guest-appearance in the film of the series Türkisch für Anfänger.

A student role was given to Max von der Groeben, who received a 'best young actor' award at the presentation of the 2013 Goldenen Kamera. Jella Haase, who appears as Chantal, had previously been awarded the Studio Hamburg Nachwuchspreis (Studio Hamburg Young Performer's Award) and the Günter-Strack-Fernsehpreis (Günter Strack Television Prize) for best actress.

=== Filming ===
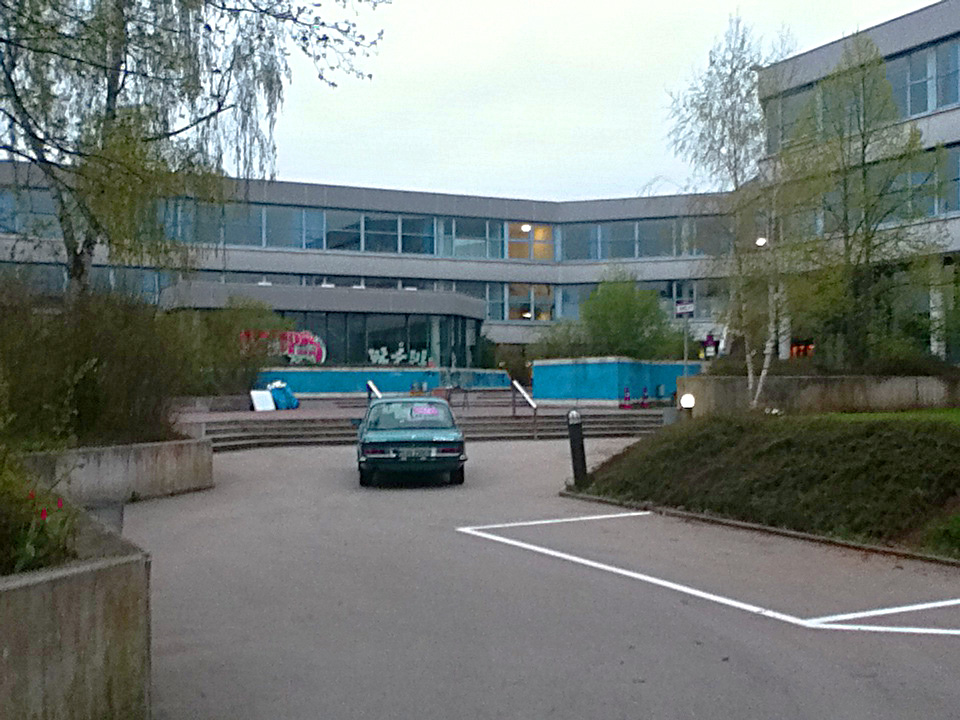
Set of the Goethe-Gesamtschule in Unterhaching on the first day of shooting

Filming took place mainly in Munich and Berlin. The Lise-Meitner-Gymnasium in Unterhaching served as the backdrop of the Goethe-Gesamtschule in the film. The school had been used before in films, such as Schule, Die Wolke, and the ZDF television series Klimawechsel. Filming in Berlin was done, among other places, on the Kurfürstendamm and in an apartment block area in Neukölln. Also, the swimming pool scenes were shot in Berlin. The prison scenes were shot in a former East German prison in Keibelstraße in Berlin.

Filming commenced on 28 April 2013 and lasted for forty-one days.

== Release ==
The film's premiere was held at the Mathäser Cinema in Munich on 29 October 2013. A one-week tour through Germany and Austria commenced on 2 November, with Bora Dağtekin, Elyas M'Barek and Karoline Herfurth, before the film was released in German cinemas on 7 November. 25 cities were visited in Germany, amongst them Hamburg, Berlin, Karlsruhe, Cologne, Cottbus and Dortmund. Linz, Vienna and Salzburg were visited in Austria.

Within 17 days, the film was seen by three million people, proving to be the most successful German film of the year in the shortest time. It became the second-highest-grossing film in Germany of all-time with a gross of €55 million from 7.3 million admissions, only behind Der Schuh des Manitu (2001).

It was released in the United States under the title Suck Me Shakespeer.

== Reviews ==
Bora Dagtekins zweite Kinoregiearbeit „Fack ju Göhte" ist eine frech-witzige Komödie mit Lachern im Minutentakt, einer Prise Gefühl und glänzenden Darstellern – ganz in der Tradition seines Debüts "Türkisch für Anfänger".
Bora Dagtekin's second theatrical feature 'Fack ju Göthe' is a cheeky and funny comedy with laughter every minute, a pinch of feeling and brilliant actors – entirely in the tradition of his debut "Türkisch für Anfänger".

— Filmstarts.de

Klar gibt es hier und da ein paar Längen, und es scheint auch obligatorisch zu sein, dass ein deutscher Film ohne abschließende Versöhnung und Zusammenführung aller Charaktere nicht funktionieren kann. Doch wenn man bedenkt, wie genüsslich man in den 120 Minuten unterhalten wurde, fällt das nicht so sehr ins Gewicht.
Sure, there are bits which drag on here and there. And it also seems obligatory that a German film without final reconciliation and coming together of all the characters won't work. However, when you consider how well you are entertained during the 120 minutes, that really doesn't matter much.

— MovieMaze.de

== Awards ==
- 2014: Nomination for the Audience's Prize of the Bayerischen Filmpreis
- 2014: Bambi Award for the best German film
- 2014: Goldene Leinwand
- 2014: Bogey Award in Platin for 5 million views at the cinema in 50 days
- 2014: Deutscher Comedypreis for the best comedy cinema movie

== Soundtrack ==
Fack ju Göhte (official soundtrack)

Soundtrack album by various artists
- Genre: Soundtrack
- Label: Polydor (Universal)

A soundtrack CD was released at the time of the film's release. Aside from various songs which were used in the film, the soundtrack also includes parts of the film's score by Beckmann and Djorkaeff.

Track list (soundtrack)

1. "Cheating" − John Newman
2. "Fack Ju Göhte Beat" − Djorkaeff
3. "Error" − Madeline Juno
4. "Pumpin Blood" − Nonono
5. "Let Her Go" − Passenger
6. "Hands Around The World" − Djorkaeff
7. "Benzin Beat" − Djorkaeff
8. "Move" − D/R Period
9. "Brother" − Smashproof
10. "Ain't No Fun" − Nitro
11. "Hey Now" − Martin Solveig
12. "Everybody Talks" − Neon Trees
13. "Das Ist Pimkie!" − Beckmann
14. "Dry My Soul" − Amanda Jenssen
15. "Change Is Gonna Come" − Olly Murs
16. "What I Go to School For" − Busted
17. "High Hopes" − Kodaline
18. "Zeitkapsel" − Beckmann
19. "Can't Help" − Parachute
20. "Deep Diving" − Thilo Brandt
21. "Klassenzimmer Beat" − Djorkaeff
22. "Laura, Sie Redet Mit Dir!" − Beckmann
23. "Theater Beat" − Djorkaeff
24. "Balkan Bachata" − Clea & Kim
25. "Touch Me (I Want Your Body)" − Samantha Fox
26. "Cheating" (Remix) − John Newman

== Sequels ==
The second film was released on 7 September 2015 in Munich. It was shown in cinemas three days later starring Elyas M'Barek and Karoline Herfurth and performed even better than original in Germany with a gross of €62.9 million from 7.7 million admissions. A third and final film was released on 22 October 2017 but did not feature Karoline Herfurth due to scheduling conflicts. It was the fifth-highest grossing German film in Germany behind the previous two films, with a gross of €53.2 million. The sequels have been released in the US as Suck Me Shakespeer 2 and Suck Me Shakespeer 3, respectively. In 2024, a fantasy spin-off centered around the character of Chantal was released under the title Chantal im Märchenland.

== Remake ==
A Mexican remake of the film titled No manches Frida ("El Maestro Suplente") was released in September 2016.
