= Michael Maertens =

German actor (born 1963)

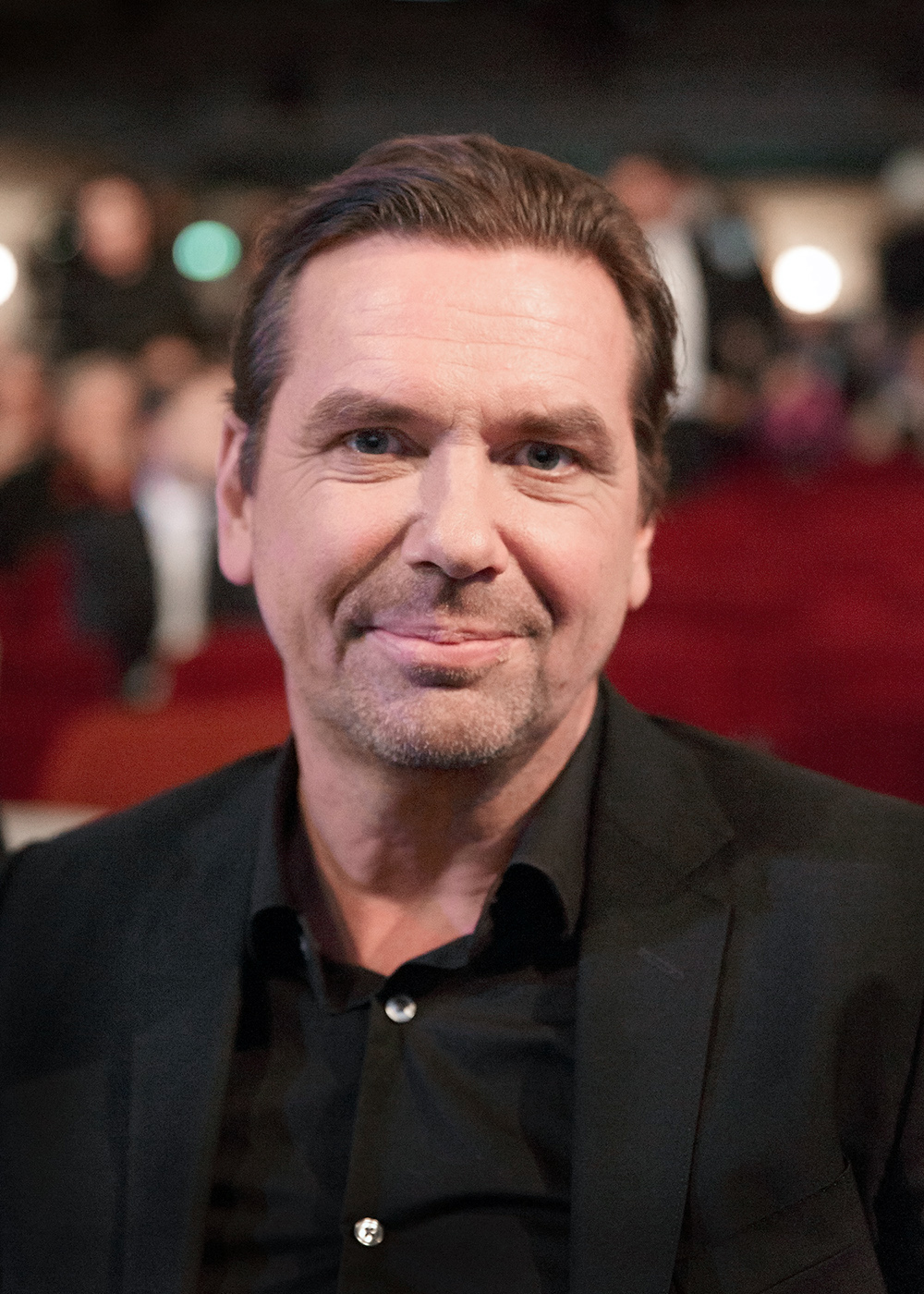
- Maertens in 2016
- Born: 30 October 1963 (age 62); Munich, West Germany
- Occupation: Actor
- Years active: 1988–present

Michael Maertens (born 30 October 1963) is a German actor. He appeared in more than forty films since 1988. His grandfather Willy Maertens was also an actor.

== Selected filmography ==
Year	Title	Role	Notes
2005	Speer und Er	Dr. Karl Brandt	
2014	Phoenix	Arzt	
2015	Beware of People	Alexander Schönleben	TV film
2015	Fack ju Göhte 2	Eckhard Badebrecht	
2017	Fack ju Göhte 3	Eckhard Badebrecht	
2023	Girl You Know It's True	Markus Klein	
2023	Das Beste Kommt Noch!	Arthur	
