= Elyas M'Barek =

Germany-based actor (born 1982)

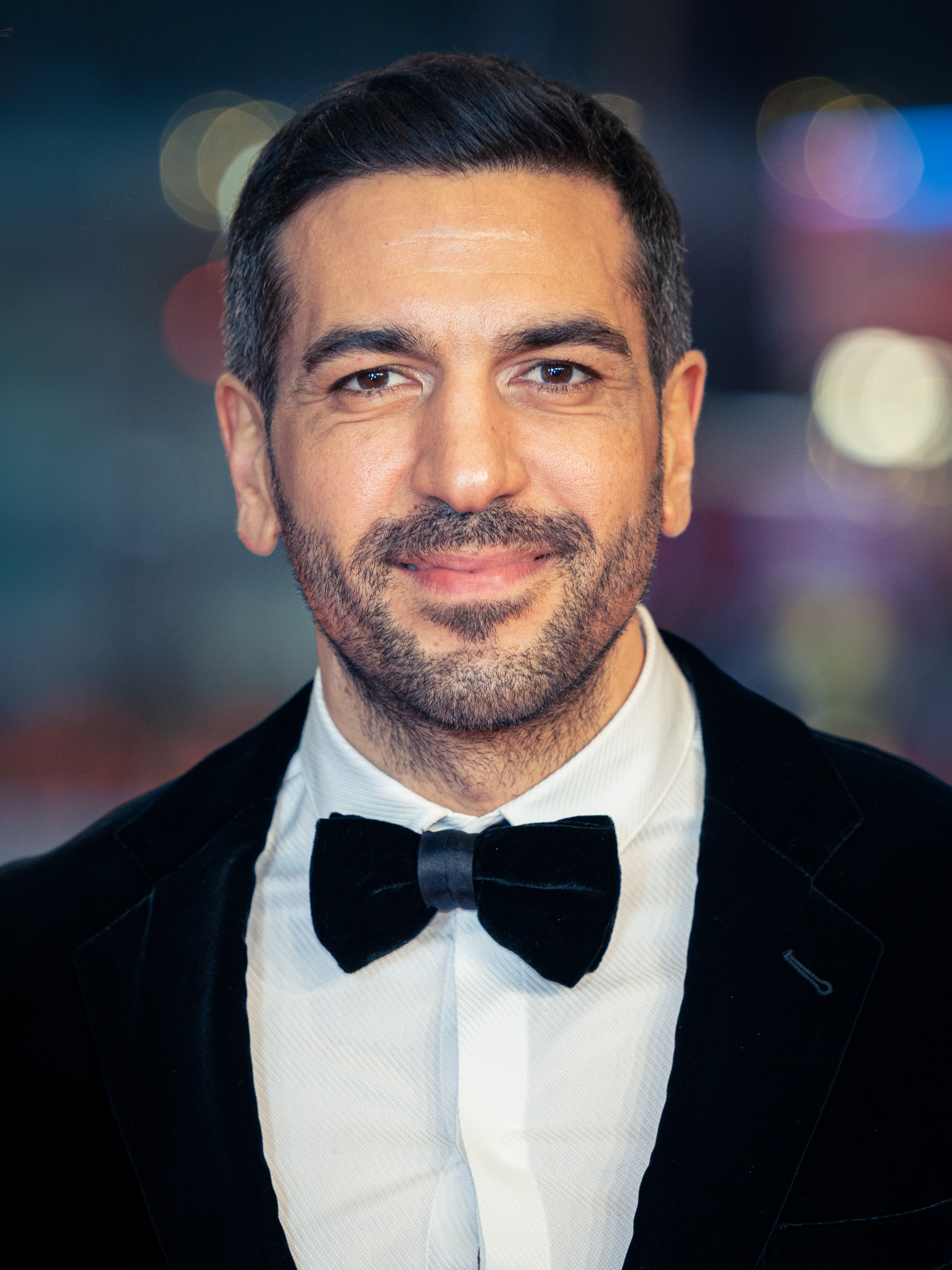
- M'Barek in 2025
- Born: 29 May 1982 (age 44); Munich, West Germany
- Citizenship: Austria
- Occupation: Actor
- Years active: 2001–present

Elyas M'Barek (German: [eˈliːas əmˈbaːʁɛk]; born 29 May 1982) is an Austrian actor based in Germany. He gained recognition for his roles in the comedy television series Türkisch für Anfänger and the 2013 comedy film Fack ju Göhte.

== Early life ==
Elyas M'Barek was born in Munich, West Germany on 29 May 1982, to an Austrian mother and a Tunisian father.

== Career ==
M'Barek's acting talent was discovered when he was still in high school, and he began acting in 2001 in Dennis Gansel's sex comedy Mädchen, Mädchen.

He is best known for playing Cem Öztürk, a young Turk, in Türkisch für Anfänger (2006). Alongside Arnel Taci, who in Türkisch für Anfänger was his best friend, he acted in the TV series "Abschnitt 40".

In 2008, he appeared in Gansel's acclaimed drama film Die Welle, in the role of Sinan, a student who embraces fascism. In 2012, he reunited with Mädchen, Mädchen and Die Welle co-star Max Riemelt in the drama film Heiter bis Wolkig opposite Jessica Schwarz and Anna Fischer and played a lead in the Turkish for Beginners feature film. He played a vampire in The Mortal Instruments: City of Bones (2013).

In 2013, he starred in Fack ju Göhte, which was seen by three million people in 17 days and became the most successful German film of the year. The same year he had a supporting role in the adventure film The Physician, which was also a box-office hit in Germany. The same year, he voiced Art in the German version of Monsters University.

In 2019 he starred as Leo Keschwari in the social comedy The Perfect Secret, and in 2020 the comedy Nightlife, as Milo. In the latter, he worked with director Simon Verhoeven, with whom he had also worked in Welcome to Germany in 2016, and again in 2024 in Old White Man.

In 2025 he appeared as Rahid Youseffi, a Tunisian political refugee, in the TV crime drama series Smilla's Sense of Snow, an international co-production created and directed by British director Amma Asante. This was his first lead role in an international production.

== Filmography ==
=== Film ===
- 2001: Mädchen, Mädchen - Blaubart
- 2002: Epstein's Night - Jochen Epstein - 19 Jahre
- 2006: Wholetrain - Elyas
- 2008: Die Welle - Sinan
- 2008: Instructor Schmidt - KSKler #2
- 2008: Klaus
- 2009: Men in the City - Aggro Berlin Member
- 2009: Zweiohrküken - Bernd
- 2010: Zeiten ändern dich - Young Bushido
- 2010: Devil's Kickers - Flo
- 2011: What a Man - Okke
- 2011: Vicky and the Treasure of the Gods - Kerkerwächter 2
- 2012: Offroad - Salim Hekimoglu
- 2012: Fünf Freunde - Tierfilmer Vince
- 2012: Turkish for Beginners - Cem Öztürk
- 2012: Heiter bis Wolkig - Can
- 2013: The Mortal Instruments: City of Bones - The Vampire Leader
- 2013: Fack ju Göhte - Zeki Müller
- 2013: The Physician - Karim
- 2013: Monsters University - Art (German version, voice)
- 2014: Who Am I – No System is Safe - Max
- 2014: The Man Cave - Eroll
- 2014: Paddington - Paddington (German version, voice, uncredited)
- 2015: Traumfrauen - Joseph
- 2015: Fack ju Göhte 2 - Zeki Müller
- 2016: Welcome to Germany - Dr. Tarek Berger
- 2017: Bullyparade – Der Film - Indian (uncredited)
- 2017: Fack ju Göhte 3 - Zeki Müller
- 2017: This Crazy Heart - Lenny Reinhard
- 2017: A.C.A. Demicus
- 2017: Teenosaurus Rex - Himself
- 2019: The Collini Case - Caspar Leinen
- 2019: The Perfect Secret - Leo Keschwari
- 2020: Nightlife - Milo
- 2020: What We Wanted
- 2024: Old White Man
- 2026: Virginia Woolf's Night and Day

=== Television films ===
- 2002: Ich schenk dir einen Seitensprung - Rosenverkäufer
- 2002: Die Stimmen
- 2005: Deutschmänner - Machmuts Kumpel
- 2009: Die ProSieben Märchenstunde: Kalif Storch
- 2010: Undercover Love - Sam McPhearson
- 2011: Rottmann schlägt zurück - Deniz Öktay
- 2011: Biss zur großen Pause – Das Highschool Vampir Grusical

=== Television series ===
- 2002: Verdammt verliebt - Mike Berger
- 2002: Samt und Seide
- 2002-2009: Tatort - Ferhat Korkmaz / Gast in Disco
- 2003: Alarm für Cobra 11 – Einsatz für Team 2: Zeugenschutz
- 2004: Schulmädchen - Ali Can
- 2005-2008: Türkisch für Anfänger - Cem Öztürk
- 2006: Abschnitt 40 - Rajel Kalifeh
- 2007-2008: KDD – Kriminaldauerdienst - Timur
- 2008: Im Namen des Gesetzes - Mehmet Karan
- 2008: Großstadtrevier - Sven Klawitter
- 2009: Rosa Roth - Nejo Gül
- 2009: Notruf Hafenkante - Hassan Demir
- 2009: Nachtschicht: Wir sind die Polizei - Assistant der Handelskammer
- 2009: Alarm für Cobra 11 – Die Autobahnpolizei - Tim Bazman
- 2009-2011: Doctor's Diary - Dr. Maurice Knechtlsdorfer
- 2010: Danni Lowinski - Rasoul Abbassi
- 2025: Smilla's Sense of Snow – Rahid Youseffi
