= Fack ju Göhte 3 =

- Theatrical release poster
- Directed by: Bora Dağtekin
- Written by: Bora Dağtekin
- Produced by: Lena Schömann; Bora Dağtekin
- Starring: Elyas M'Barek; Jella Haase
- Cinematography: Andreas Berger
- Edited by: Charles Ladmiral
- Music by: Djorkaeff; Beatzarre
- Production company: Constantin Film
- Distributed by: Constantin Film
- Release date: 22 October 2017
- Running time: 121 minutes
- Country: Germany
- Language: German
- Box office: $66 million

Fack ju Göhte 3 (intentional misspelling of "Fuck you, Goethe") is a 2017 German comedy directed by Bora Dağtekin and starring Elyas M'Barek and Jella Haase, while upcoming actors Max von der Groeben and Gizem Emre appear as supporting roles. The film, produced by Constantin Film, is the sequel to the 2015 film Fack ju Göhte 2. It premiered on 22 October 2017 in Munich and was released nationwide four days later. The third part is the final installment of the series.

== Plot ==
Zeki takes the kids to an employment office where they take an exam to assess their ideal future careers. No one gets a result that they like. They are put in a room to watch videos of those careers, and then destroy the room's Movie projector out of anger and desperation. This leads to a complaint being filed against the school. The kids evade capture, and while searching for them in a park, Zeki comes across a woman who found her dog thanks to a GPS microchip.

The next day, an official investigator comes to the school and everything goes wrong. First, they find Zeki smoking in the bathroom. A child, Justin, is strapped to a large drone which Zeki built; their attempts to tie it to a statue to control it cause the statue to fall and break the investigator's car. Then the entire school's fire sprinkler system is turned on spewing sticky red paint everywhere.

Director Gerster gives them four weeks to change everything otherwise the school will be closed. She also threatens Zeki with prison if his class' issues are not resolved by then. Soon after, Zeki forcibly injects the troublemakers with similar GPS microchips, allowing him to track them 24/7 even when they are not in school.

He is a substitute for one day at an elementary school whose kids are well-behaved, and have already picked careers which they have written essays about. Zeki lists the names of his students and asks each elementary student to put one of them on their essays. He brings the essays back to his classroom and suddenly everyone now has a career which they can strive towards. Justin attempts to prove his bravery by jumping off a roof but ends up breaking his arm.

Etienne and Chantal have become a couple but due to his Asperger's syndrome he is too scared to have any physical contact or sex. He develops a virtual reality game with full bodysuit support which allows them to stimulate each other's sexual organs without touching each other.

As revenge for the chips, Zeki's students sexually assault him, sticking objects in his anus and forcing him to swallow them, which causes him to lose consciousness. Danger, however, is able to resucitate him with his excessive body odor soon enough for Gerster to come in and supervise the class.

Chantal's entire family are drug addicts none of whom completed High School. Arriving at a bar which Chantal's mother owns, Zeki and Biggi threaten her with violence if they interfere with Chantal's schooling. Using the chips they continue stalking the troublemakers and end up at a party where Biggi gets drunk, leading to another meeting with Gerster.

The school hosts a motivational assembly where Zeki, Justin, Chantal and others talk about their troubled past and how they overcame their issues. Zeki breaks into a government office and copies the answers of a standardized test. But the students suddenly have a change of heart, rip up the answers and decide to study for the test themselves, entering a library for the first time in their life.

Shortly after passing the exam, Chantal is drugged and almost killed in a mobile home, but Etienne and Zeki save them. This makes her popular and jumpstarts her career as a magazine journalist. At graduation, after sabotaging Gerster's speech, they present their good test results and almost everyone ends up with a fulfilling career. Danger is accepted into art school. Zeki gets Justin's class but remains good friends with the graduates.

== Cast ==
- Elyas M'Barek as Zeki Müller
- Jella Haase as Chantal
- Sandra Hüller as Biggi Enzberger
- Katja Riemann as Gudrun Gerster
- Max von der Groeben as Danger
- Gizem Emre as Zeynep
- Aram Arami as Burak
- Lucas Reiber as Etienne
- Anna Lena Klenke as Laura Schnabelstedt
- Runa Greiner as Meike
- Lea van Acken as Amrei Keiser
- Uschi Glas as Ingrid Leimbach-Knorr
- Jana Pallaske as Charlie
- Farid Bang as Paco
- Michael Maertens as Eckhard Badebrecht
- Bernd Stegemann as Gundlach
- Corinna Harfouch as Kerstin
- Irm Hermann as Ploppi's grandma
- Julia Dietze as Angelika Wiechert
- Anton Petzold as Justin
- Tristan Göbel as Schütte
- Rafael Koussouris as Hasko
- Pamela Knaack as Jackie Ackermann

== Production ==
=== Casting ===
Elyas M'Barek and Jella Haase reprised their main roles from the first two films. Katja Riemann, Max von der Groeben, Gizem Emre, Aram Arami reappeared as well, while Karoline Herfurth, present in Fack ju Göhte and Fack ju Göhte 2, dropped out of the project due to scheduling conflicts. As a replacement, Sandra Hüller was cast, playing a similar role.

=== Filming ===
Filming took place in Munich and Kirchheim bei München. The Lise-Meitner-Gymnasium in Unterhaching served as the backdrop of the Goethe-Gesamtschule.
