= Wholetrain =

- Directed by: Florian Gaag
- Starring: Elyas M'Barek; Mike Adler
- Release date: 11 February 2006 (BIFF)
- Running time: 1h 22min
- Country: Germany
- Language: German

Wholetrain is a 2006 German drama film directed by Florian Gaag. It depicts a group of friends spraying graffiti on trains at night.

== Cast ==
- Elyas M'Barek - Elyas
- Mike Adler - David
- Florian Renner - Tino
- Jacob Matschenz - Achim
- Alexander Held - Polizist Steinbauer
- Patrick von Blume - Polizist Gruber
- David Mayonga - Don
