= Adnan Maral =

Turkish-German actor (born 1968)

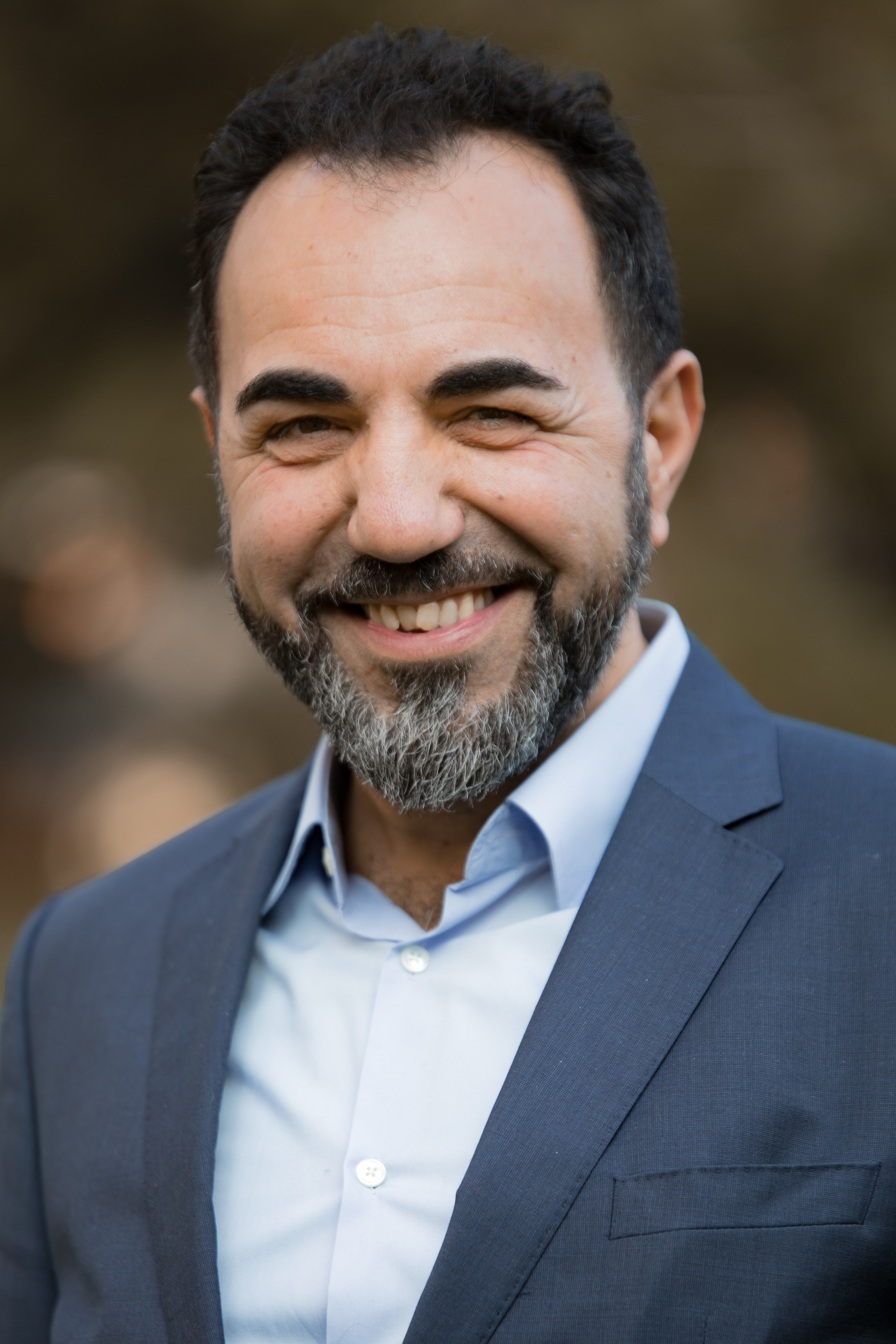
- Adnan Maral (2018)
- Born: 1 July 1968 (age 57); Çıldır, Turkey
- Years active: 1996–present

Adnan Maral (born 1 July 1968) is a Turkish-German actor best known for his role in the German comedy Türkisch für Anfänger.

== Filmography ==
Film
Year	Film	Role	Notes
2016	The Wild Soccer Bunch 6: The Legend Lives!		
2015	Famous Five 4	Ashreff	
2012	Turkish for Beginners	Metin Öztürk	
2011	Tom Sawyer		
2011	Unknown	Taxi driver	
2009	Vasha	Kerim	
2006	Fay Grim	Hassan	
2006	The Wild Soccer Bunch 3	Hadschi Ben Hadschi	
2005	The Wild Soccer Bunch 2		
2004	Kebab Connection	Kirianis	
2003	The Wild Soccer Bunch	Greengrocer	
2002	Lassie		short
2002	Karamuk	Cumhur Olmez	
2000	Musik hat ihn kaputt gemacht	Marco	short

=== Television ===
Year	Film	Role	Notes
2009	Der verlorene Sohn	Nazim Çiçek	
2006-08	Türkisch für Anfänger	Metin Öztürk	52 episodes
2008	Plötzlich Papa – Einspruch abgelehnt!	Talas Bahakir	1 episode
2008	Schloss Einstein	Herr Farsad	2 episodes
2008	GSG 9 – Ihr Einsatz ist ihr Leben	Karim Atwi	1 episode
2007	Rosa Roth	Hussein	1 episode
1996-06	Tatort	Erman Özay	2 episodes
2006	Blackout – Die Erinnerung ist tödlich	Übersetzer	1 episode
2005	Stubbe – Von Fall zu Fall		
2005	Die Rettungsflieger	Jussov	1 episode
2005	Sabine	Herr Dilek	1 episode
2004	Polizeiruf 110		
2004	The Hamburg Cell	Marwan al-Shehhi	
2004	Saniyes Lust	Ugur Toprak	
2004	Cologne P.D.	Ali Yasar	1 episode
2004	Poldi & Drecksau		
2003	ABC des Lebens	Genschai	
2002	Balko	Yilmaz	1 episode
2001	Selda		
2001	Oh du Liebezeit	Busfahrer	
1997	Hinter Gittern – Der Frauenknast	Herr Ercan	1 episode
1997	Marienhof	Mehmet Memis	1 episode

== Awards ==
- 2006: Deutscher Fernsehpreis (German television award, best actors in a TV series) for Türkisch für Anfänger.
