= Kidnapping Stella =

German-language 2019 thriller film on Netflix

- Film poster
- Directed by: Thomas Sieben
- Written by: Thomas Sieben
- Based on: The Disappearance of Alice Creed by J Blakeson
- Starring: Clemens Schick; Jella Haase; Max von der Groeben
- Distributed by: Netflix
- Release date: July 12, 2019
- Running time: 89 minutes
- Country: Germany
- Language: German

Kidnapping Stella is a 2019 German thriller film directed and written by Thomas Sieben, and is a remake of the 2009 British thriller The Disappearance of Alice Creed. The plot revolves around two men, Vic (Clemens Schick) and Tom (Max von der Groeben), who kidnap Stella (Jella Haase), and shows how she tries to escape the clutches of her two masked kidnappers.

The film was released on Netflix on July 12, 2019.

== Plot ==
Two former convicts named Vic (Clemens Schick) and Tom (Max von der Groeben) kidnap Stella (Jella Haase), the estranged daughter of a wealthy businessman, as part of a get-rich scheme.

The men take Stella to a run-down flat, in which they have previously soundproofed a room. They strip off her clothes and dress her in a tracksuit, blindfold and gag her, and tie her to a bed. To conceal their identities, Vic and Tom wear masks when interacting with Stella.

It is later revealed that Tom was Stella’s lover and that she is four months pregnant with their child.

Stella’s father initially refuses to pay her ransom. Tom becomes disillusioned with the plan after Vic threatens to cut off one of Stella's fingers, during a video broadcast intended to convince her father to hand over the money.

Stella discovers that Tom is one of her kidnappers. During an escape attempt, she fires a pistol and manages to obtain one of their cellphones. Stella tries to call the police but is subdued by Tom, who is increasingly guilt-ridden about hurting his former girlfriend.

Vic learns from Stella about Tom's failure to prevent her escape attempt. Under the pretext of collecting ransom from Stella's father, Vic lures Tom into a trap in the forest. Tom is wounded during a shootout but manages to escape.

Vic later collects the ransom but decides to kill Stella at their second hiding place, a boathouse, where the men have left her chained up. However, Tom returns in time to kill Vic, and pass the keys to Stella, enabling her to release herself.

As Tom lies dying, Stella gets into the men’s car, which is parked near the boathouse. In the passenger seat is the bag containing the ransom money. Stella drives off with the money, to start a wealthy new life with her expected baby.

== Cast ==
- Jella Haase as Stella
- Clemens Schick as Vic
- Max von der Groeben as Tom

== Release ==
It was released on July 12, 2019 on Netflix streaming. According to Netflix, over 18 million accounts watched Kidnapping Stella within the first week of release.

=== Home media ===
This released on DVD & Blu-ray on TBA by Studio Distribution Services.

== Reception ==
Nafees Ahmed of the website "High on Films" awarded the film three out of five stars. While finding the story unimaginative and predictable, Ahmed praised Kidnapping Stella for focusing on the organic character development between Tom and Stella while taking fault with the underdevelopment of Vic's character.
