= Bora Dağtekin =

German screenwriter and film director

Bora Dagtekin
- Born: 27 October 1978 (age 47); Hanover, West Germany
- Occupations: Screenwriter, film director
- Years active: 1994–present

Bora Dagtekin (born 27 October 1978) is a German screenwriter and film director who has directed several of the most successful German-language films, notably Fack ju Göhte.

== Early life ==
Dagtekin was born and raised in Hanover to a German mother and a Turkish father and moved to Ludwigsburg to study screenwriting at the Film Academy Baden-Württemberg, graduating in 2006. His thesis screenplay was an retelling of the classic German play The Robbers as an action film.

== Career ==
Dagtekin worked as a writer in the advertising industry before finding employment as a writer for various German television series, among them the soap opera Gute Zeiten, schlechte Zeiten. His directorial debut was Türkisch für Anfänger (2006–2009); he also wrote and directed a feature-length film with the same name in 2012.

His biggest success was the 2013 film Fack ju Göhte, which was the fourth-most successful German film ever as measured by audience numbers and spawned a movie franchise with two sequels as well as a musical and a spin-off.

== Personal life ==
Dagtekin is known to keep his private life out of the public eye. He has stated in interviews that his films are unapologetically commercial rather than artistic and that this is a reflection of his personal taste, as he does not enjoy the more experimental style of art films.

== Filmography ==
=== Film ===
| Year | Title | Director | Writer | Producer | Notes |
|---|---|---|---|---|---|
| 2003 | Toyotafahrer leben länger | No | Yes | No | Short film |
| 2005 | Season Greetings | No | Yes | No | Short film |
| 2006 | Where Is Fred? | No | Yes | No | |
| 2008 | Eine wie keiner | No | Yes | No | |
| 2012 | Turkish for Beginners | Yes | Yes | No | |
| 2013 | Fack ju Göhte | Yes | Yes | Co-producer | |
| 2015 | Fack ju Göhte 2 | Yes | Yes | Yes | |
| 2017 | Fack ju Göhte 3 | Yes | Yes | Yes | |
| 2019 | The Perfect Secret | Yes | Yes | Yes | |
| 2024 | Chantal im Märchenland | Yes | Yes | No | |

=== Writer ===
| Year | Title | Writer | Notes |
|---|---|---|---|
| 2001 | Gute Zeiten, schlechte Zeiten | Yes | 1 episode |
| 2004 | Meine schönsten Jahre | Yes | 1 episode |
| 2004–2005 | Schulmädchen | Yes | 7 episodes; also co-creator |
| 2006–2008 | Türkisch für Anfänger | Yes | 43 episodes; also creator |
| 2007–2008 | Doctor's Diary | Yes | 24 episodes; also creator |
| 2010 | Undercover Love | Yes | Television film |

== Awards ==
- 2006: Deutscher Fernsehpreis (Türkisch für Anfänger for best series)
- 2007: Adolf-Grimme-Preis
- 2007: Civis Media Prize
- 2008: BANFF World Television Award
- 2008: Deutscher Fernsehpreis (Doctor's Diary as the best series)
- 2008: Deutscher Comedypreis (Doctor's Diary as the best comedy-series)
- 2009: Adolf-Grimme-Preis (Doctor's Diary)
- 2009: Bayerischer Fernsehpreis (Doctor's Diary)
- 2009: Winner TV Festival Monte Carlo (Türkisch für Anfänger)
