= Nightlife (2020 film) =

- Theatrical release poster
- Directed by: Simon Verhoeven
- Written by: Simon Verhoeven
- Produced by: Max Wiedemann; Quirin Berg
- Starring: Elyas M'Barek; Palina Rojinski; Frederick Lau
- Cinematography: Jo Heim
- Edited by: Denis Bachter; Stefan Essl
- Music by: Maximilian Wanninger
- Production companies: Wiedemann & Berg Film; Sentana Filmproduktion; SevenPictures Film
- Distributed by: Warner Bros. Pictures
- Release date: 13 February 2020
- Running time: 111 minutes
- Country: Germany
- Language: German
- Box office: $14.3 million

Nightlife is a 2020 German comedy film written and directed by Simon Verhoeven, starring Elyas M'Barek, Palina Rojinski and Frederick Lau.

== Cast ==
- Elyas M'Barek as Milo
- Palina Rojinski as Sunny
- Frederick Lau as Renzo
- Nicholas Ofczarek as Kempa
- Mark Filatov as Sorokin
- Julian Looman as Jan
- Caro Cult as Ricky
- Cristina do Rego as Steffi
- Rauand Taleb as Mennrich

== Accolades ==
- Romy – (2020), Best Film Director
