= Fly Me Away (film) =

- Theatrical release poster
- French: Envole-moi
- Directed by: Christophe Barratier
- Screenplay by: Matthieu Delaporte; Alexandre de La Patellière; Anthony Marciano; Christophe Barratier
- Based on: This Crazy Heart by: Maggie Peren; Andi Rogenhagen; Dieses bescheuerte Herz: Über den Mut zu träumen by: Lars Amend; Daniel Meyer
- Produced by: Dimitri Rassam; Matthieu Delaporte; Alexandre de La Patellière
- Starring: Victor Belmondo; Gérard Lanvin; Yoann Eloundou; Ornella Fleury; Marie-Sohna Condé
- Cinematography: Jérôme Alméras
- Edited by: Yves Deschamps
- Music by: Philippe Rombi
- Production companies: Chapter 2; France 2 Cinéma; LDPR II; Palomar
- Distributed by: Pathé Distribution (France); I Wonder Pictures (Italy)
- Release dates: 19 May 2021 (France); 19 August 2021 (Italy)
- Running time: 91 minutes
- Countries: France; Italy
- Language: French
- Box office: $2.3 million

Fly Me Away (French: Envole-moi) is a 2021 French-Italian coming-of-age comedy-drama film directed by Christophe Barratier. It is about the spoiled son of a doctor who is forced to take care of a handicapped 12-year-old boy who suffers from illnesses. It is a remake of the 2017 German film This Crazy Heart, which itself was based on the novel Dieses bescheuerte Herz: Über den Mut zu träumen by Lars Amend and Daniel Meyer.

== Cast ==
- Victor Belmondo as Thomas Reinhard
- Gérard Lanvin as Dr. Henri Reinhard
- Yoann Eloundou as Marcus
- Ornella Fleury as Julie
- Marie-Sohna Condé as Maïssa
- François Bureloup as Mr. Rouvier
- Jean-Louis Barcelona as Jean-Louis
- Gwendalina Doycheva as Manon
- Andranic Manet as Charles
- Delphine Cottu as Astrid
- Laurence Joseph as Clarisse
