= Max von der Groeben =

German actor (born 1992)

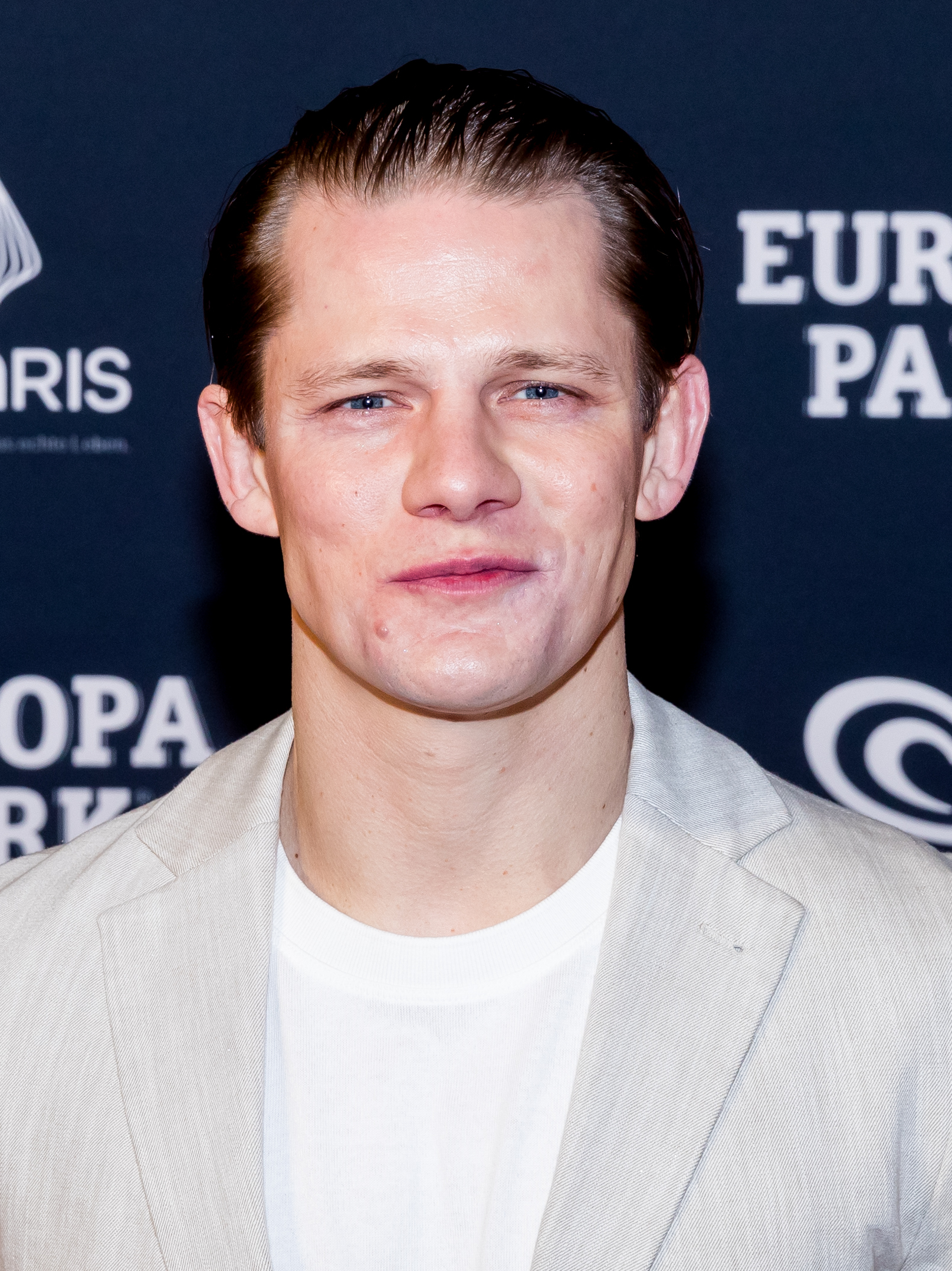
- Von der Groeben in 2024
- Born: Maximilian von der Groeben; 15 January 1992 (age 34); Cologne, Germany
- Occupation: Actor
- Years active: 2004–present

Maximilian "Max" von der Groeben (born 15 January 1992) is a German actor. His father Alexander von der Groeben is a former judoka, sports journalist and also an actor. His mother Ulrike von der Groeben is also a sports journalist. He has one Sister, Caroline, who also works as an actress and a journalist.

== Selected filmography ==
Year	Title	Role	Notes
2004	Kings of Comedy		
2004–2005	Bernds Hexe	Max Bauermann	
2005	Rotkäppchen	Konrad	
2007	Spurlos – Alles muss versteckt sein		
2009	Danni Lowinski		episode "Mutterkind"
2011	Free-running Men	learner	
2011	Cologne P.D.		episode "Klassentreffen"
2011	Inklusion – gemeinsam anders	Paul Fischer	
2012–	Die LottoKönige	Theo König	
2012	Unter uns		2 episodes
2012	Polizeiruf 110	Dietrich Kummert ("Ditsche")	episode "Eine andere Welt"
2013	Der Staatsanwalt		episode "Bis aufs Blut"
2013	Fack ju Göhte	Danger	
2014	Bibi & Tina	Freddy	
2014	Playing Doctor	Harry	
2014	Bibi & Tina: Bewildered and Bewitched	Freddy	
2015	Abschussfahrt	Max	
2015	Fack ju Göhte 2	Danger	
2016	Bibi & Tina: Girls vs. Boys	Freddy	
2016	Tatort	Benny	episode "Mia san jetz da wo's weh tut"
2016	Nachtschicht	Punk	episode "Ladies First"
2017	Bibi & Tina: Perfect Pandemonium	Freddy	
2017	Fack ju Göhte 3	Danger	
2019	Kidnapping Stella	Tom	
2021	Hinterland	Kommissar Paul Severin	
2023	The Interpreter of Silence	Hans Kübler	
2025	Die Nichte des Polizisten	Christoph Laurin	
2026	Das gewisse Etwas		
