= Doctor's Diary =

- Doctor's Diary – Männer sind die beste Medizin
- Genre: Medical drama, comedy
- Created by: Bora Dağtekin
- Opening theme: "Dirty Laundry" by Bitter:Sweet
- Country of origin: Germany
- No. of seasons: 3
- No. of episodes: 24

Production
- Running time: 45 minutes

Original release
- Network: RTL
- Release: 2008 – 2011

Doctor's Diary is a German-Austrian medical drama that aired for three seasons from 2008 to 2011 on RTL in a coproduction with ORF. The focus of the series is the young doctor Margarete "Gretchen" Haase, who wants to make a career in a hospital. It was directed by Bora Dağtekin. Three seasons were made and shown from 23 June 2008 to 14 February 2011 on German channel RTL.

In Canada, it was shown starting 31 August 2010 on Séries+ television, and in France from 8 June 2011 on TF1 television and starting 31 March 2013 on HD1 television.

== Plot ==
One week before her wedding to her fiancé Peter, Gretchen Haase's world falls apart. She returns to Berlin to her parents' house where her father, Professor Franz Haase, suggests that she apply for an assistant doctor position in surgery at the hospital where he works. Following up on his suggestion, she meets her old school crush Dr. Marc Meier, who works as the head of surgery at the hospital. During their schooldays, he never wasted a day in making her life difficult and never returned her affection. Now as they meet again, he promptly starts to tease her again, this time about her weight, which she is very sensitive about.

== Cast ==
- Diana Amft (VF: Micheline Tsiamalis): Dr. Margarete "Gretchen (en VO) / Meg (en VF)" Haase
- Florian David Fitz (VF: Alexandre Crepet): Dr. Marc Olivier Meier
- Kai Schumann (VF: Sébastien Hébrant): Dr. Mehdi Kaan
- Peter Prager (VF: Jean-Michel Vovk): Dr. Franz Haase
- Laura Osswald (VF: Chloé Berthier): Gabi Kragenow
- Ursela Monn (VF: Francine Laffineuse): Bärbel Haase
- Annette Strasser: Sabine Vögler
- Julia Koschitz: Dr Maria Hassmann
- Zsá Zsá Inci Bürkle: Margarete "Gretchen (en VO) / Meg (en VF)" Haase young
- Antoine Brison & Lucas Reiber: Marc Olivier Meier young
- Fabian Oscar Wien (VF: Christophe Hespel): Jochen Haase (seasons 1–2)
- Chantal Hourticolon: Lilly Kaan (seasons 1–2)
- Adele Neuhauser: Elke Fisher
- Bo Hansen: Gordon Tolkien
- Hannah Schröder: Anna Kaan (seasons 1–2)
- Dominic Boeer: Brad Hollister (seasons 1 & 3)
- Elyas M'Barek: Dr. Maurice Knechtelsdorfer (seasons 2–3)
- Steffen Groth: Frank Muffke / Alexis von Buren (seasons 2–3)
- Paula Schramm: Lissi von Buren (seasons 2–3)
- Roberto Guerra: Eric (season 2)
- Bärbel Schleker: Madame Nettelsbacher (season 2)
- Nina Vorbrodt: Stefanie Brinkmann (season 3)
- Cristina do Rego: Sœur Ingeborg (seasons 2–3)
- Valerie Niehaus: Dr Gina "Gigi" Amsel (seasons 2–3)
- Ingrid van Bergen: Mechthild von Buren (seasons 2–3)
- Marc Benjamin Puch: Dr Günni Gümmersbach (season 3)
- Maria Ehrich: Peggy (season 3)
- Irm Hermann: Madame Vögler (saison 3)
- Christian Näthe: Fritz (season 3)
- Nora Tschirner: Mitzi Knechtelsdorfer (season 3)
- Maxi Biewer: Maxi Biewer (season 3)
- Angela Finger-Erben: Angela Finger-Erben (season 3)
- Günther Jauch: Günther Jauch (season 3)

== See also ==
- List of German television series
