= Türkisch für Anfänger =

German television comedy-drama series

- Created by: Bora Dağtekin
- Starring: Josefine Preuß; Emil Reinke; Anna Stieblich; Elyas M'Barek; Pegah Ferydoni; Adnan Maral; Arnel Taci; Axel Schreiber; Carl-Heinz Choinsky; Katharina Kaali; Andreas Hofer; Susanne Kirschnik
- Opening theme: "Gegen den Rest" by Karpatenhund
- Country of origin: Germany
- No. of seasons: 3
- No. of episodes: 52

Production
- Producers: Hoffmann & Voges Ent.
- Running time: 25 minutes

Original release
- Network: Das Erste
- Release: 14 March 2006 – 12 December 2008

Türkisch für Anfänger ("Turkish for Beginners") is a German television comedy-drama series, which premiered on 14 March 2006 on Das Erste. It was created by Bora Dağtekin and produced by Hoffmann & Voges Ent.

The show focuses on the German-Turkish stepfamily Schneider-Öztürk, their everyday lives and particularly on the eldest daughter, Lena, who narrates the show. During its run of 52 episodes, the show covered topics including typical problems of teenagers and cross-cultural experiences. The run includes a 16-episode third season, which aired due to popular demand in late 2008.

The show was successful in foreign markets, being broadcast in more than 70 countries.

A namesake feature film was released in 2012, with a cast including actors from the show; the plot is completely original, though loosely based on the show's premise.

== Plot ==
16-year-old Lena's life seemed perfect: She lived together with just her little brother Nils (13) and her mother Doris, a psychotherapist. But unfortunately for Lena, her mother has fallen in love with Metin, a police officer of Turkish descent, and they move in with him and Yağmur (15), his pious Muslim daughter, and Cem (17), his stereotypical macho son. Now Lena has to deal with her new stepfamily. She narrates the show by recording videos for her best friend Kati, who is currently studying in the USA as an exchange student.

The episode titles imitate those of Friends (The One with...), for example:

- "Die, in der ich meine Freiheit verliere" ("The One Where I Lose My Freedom")
- "Die, in der ich keine Schwester will" ("The One Where I Don't Want a Sister")

=== Season 1 ===
The new family adjusts to each other - which is more difficult than Doris and Metin thought. Lena and Yağmur are forced to share a room, which immediately complicates their relationship, especially because Lena is an atheist and Yağmur is an observant Muslim. Free-spirited Doris is now responsible for two more children, her stepson Cem, who is a bit macho, and her stepdaughter, who is critical of her subpar kitchen-skills.

Meanwhile, Lena and Nils try to fit in at their new school, which is different from their old one since most of the students have a migrant background. Lena eventually befriends Axel, who also attends her school and is a patient of Doris. Axel, who is an orphan, immediately feels comfortable at the Schneider-Öztürk's and soon falls in love with Lena. At first, Lena denies her feelings for him, but eventually they become a couple. Cem attempts to have a relationship with Ching, a Viet teenager, but fails. Axel has a minor relationship with Ching, but reveals that it wasn't a „real” relationship.

However, Cem realises that he, too, is in love with Lena, leaving Lena torn between Cem and Axel as she has developed feelings for her step-brother, as well. To keep their relationship safe, Axel and Lena try to make Cem and Ching a couple. When Axel and Lena overhear Cem talking about his feelings for her, before realizing the relationship was made up, Axel breaks up with Lena, but is run over by a bicycle on his way home and severely hurt. Lena blames herself and thinks that he tried to kill himself because she chose Cem over him. She then swears to never leave Axel again at his bedside, leaving Cem heartbroken. Axel sees through the misunderstanding, but chooses not to tell that it was an accident.

Meanwhile, Doris' father Hans-Hermann Schneider (called "Hermi") comes to visit, which Doris is not happy about as they have had a strained relationship since her childhood. However, when she finds out that her father has lost his beloved button factory and his home due to bankruptcy, she lets him move in with the Schneider-Öztürk's.

=== Season 2 ===
After Axel's suicide-attempt, Lena chooses to pursue a relationship with him rather than Cem. But this isn't as easy as she wants it to be. Lena and Cem begin to have a relationship behind Axel's back. However, Lena finds it "immoral" and breaks it off with Cem, even though she is falling in love with him. When Cem discovers that Axel didn't attempt suicide at all, he tells people, but no one, not even Lena, believes him. When he falls into a manhole and hurts himself, he decides to break up with Lena once and for all, even after the truth comes out. He still has feelings for her and when he tries to lose his virginity with a prostitute, he hesitates and decides that he still wants to be with Lena. When Lena finds out that Cem went to a prostitute, she feels hurt and decides to sleep with Axel and forget everything about him. This action ends her relationship with Cem.

The house gets even more crowded after Hermi's moving when Doris' sister Diana visits and gets a job at Lena's school. Diana discovers that Nils is intellectually gifted and he leaves the family to attend a high-class boarding school.

Meanwhile, Yağmur flirts online with an unknown boy who turns out to be Cem's best friend Costa. Costa falls in love with the unaware Yağmur and tries to tell her that he is the one she has been chatting with, but his stuttering holds him back every time. When they eventually meet up for a date and Costa reveals himself to be her secret admirer, Yağmur is outraged since Costa is neither Muslim nor Turkish. But when he saves her from a pair of Nazis and stops stuttering every time he holds her hand, she believes in a miracle her mother had told her about and they begin a relationship, much to Cem's and Metin's dismay.

Metin, on the other hand, proposes to Doris and after some initial difficulties (due to her emancipated views, Doris could not handle Metin proposing to her), she happily accepts. However, the wedding plan comes to the attention of Doris' ex-husband Markus, the father of Lena and Nils. He leaves the Amazon and returns to Germany to stop Doris from being what she never wanted to be: a housewife.

Lena meets and befriends the pious Christian Ulla. Lena is still in love with Cem and wants Ulla to flirt with him and then snub him as revenge, but Ulla and Cem fall in love. With Markus' help, Lena tries to break them up on the night of her birthday party.

=== Season 3 ===
The third season continues two years after Doris and Metin's wedding. Cem fails in school and breaks up with his girlfriend Ulla. The love story of Cem and Lena starts all over thereafter. Later, Cem gets Lena pregnant and Lena decides to become a stay-at-home-mum to take care of their baby, while Cem, on the other hand, has to work as a police officer to earn money. Unlike Cem, Yağmur finishes school and becomes a translator while Costa pursues a career in design. Doris fears the natural process of aging and uses Botox injections, which speeds up her menopause and leaves her infertile. Although the show says nothing about Yağmur and Costa getting married, they are still happily together throughout the season. Sadly, Grandpa Hermann dies from a heart attack.

== Cast ==
=== Main characters ===
- Josefine Preuß as Helena "Lena" Claudette Schneider
- Emil Reinke as Nils Schneider, Lena's little brother
- Anna Stieblich as Doris Schneider, the mother of Lena and Nils
- Elyas M'Barek as Cem Öztürk
- Pegah Ferydoni as Yağmur Öztürk
- Adnan Maral as Metin Öztürk, father of Cem and Yağmur

=== Supporting cast ===
- Arnel Taci as Costa Papavassilou
- Axel Schreiber as Axel Mende
- Carl-Heinz Choinsky as Hermann Schneider
- Katharina Kaali as Diana Schneider
- Andreas Hofer as Markus Lemke
- Susanne Kirschnick as Ulla Jamuschke

== Awards ==
- 2006: Nymphe d'Or at the "Festival de Télévision de Monte-Carlo", for "Best European Producer for a Comedy show"
- 2006: Prix Italia, for "Best Drama-Show or Serial"
- 2006: Deutscher Fernsehpreis, for "Best Show"
- 2006: Reflet d'Or CINEMA TOUT ECRAN, for "Best Show"
- 2007: Adolf-Grimme-Preis, for "Entertainment Show"
- 2007: Civis Media Prize, for "Entertainment Show"
- 2008: Banff Rockie Award at Banff World Television Festival, for "Telenovela & Serial Programs"

=== Nominations ===
- 2006: Rose d'Or, nominated for "Sitcom" and "Social Awareness"
- 2006: Nymphe d'Or Festival de Télévision de Monte-Carlo, nominated for "Best Comedy Series", "Outstanding Producer" and "Outstanding Actor/Actress"
- 2006: Deutscher Fernsehpreis, nominated for "Best Show" and "Best Actor in a show"
- 2006: Prix Europa
- 2007: Adolf-Grimme-Preis, nominated for "Entertainment/Special"
- 2007: Rose d'Or, nominated for "Sitcom" and "Social Awareness"
- 2009: International Academy of Television Arts and Sciences, nominated for "Comedy"

== Production details ==
The creator of the show, Bora Dağtekin, grew up in a German-Turkish home (his father was Turkish, his mother German) therefore—according to him—personal experiences influenced his writing. Specific episodes are written by guest writers, often of Turkish descent.

== Merchandise ==
=== DVD releases ===
| DVD name | Number of episodes | Release date | Bonus Features |
|---|---|---|---|
| Season 1 | 12 | 27 March 2006 | Audio Commentaries, Deleted Scenes, Casting Best-Offs |
| Season 2.1 | 12 | 16 April 2007 | Audio Commentaries, Outtakes, Making Of, Interviews |
| Season 2.2 | 12 | 14 May 2007 | Audio Commentaries, Outtakes, Making Of, Interviews |
| Season 1&2 | 36 | 15 November 2007 | Deleted Scenes, Audio Commentaries, Outtakes, Making Of, Interviews |

=== Books ===
Four books, written by Claudia Kühn, have been published accompanying this TV show.

- Türkisch für Anfänger 01 - Meine verrückte Familie (March 2007)
- Türkisch für Anfänger 02 - Verwirrung hoch sechs (March 2007)
- Türkisch für Anfänger 03 - Durchdrehen garantiert (October 2008)
- Türkisch für Anfänger 04 - Der ganz normale Wahnsinn (October 2008)
