= This Crazy Heart =

2017 German film

- Theatrical release poster
- Directed by: Marc Rothemund
- Starring: Elyas M'Barek; Philip Noah Schwarz
- Production companies: Constantin Film; Olga Film
- Distributed by: Constantin Film
- Release date: 21 December 2017
- Running time: 104 minutes
- Country: Germany
- Language: German

This Crazy Heart (German: Dieses bescheuerte Herz) is a 2017 German comedy film directed by Marc Rothemund, based on the book Dieses bescheuerte Herz: Über den Mut zu träumen by Lars Amend and Daniel Meyer. It was remade in France as Fly Me Away (2021).

== Cast ==
- Elyas M'Barek - Lennard "Lenny" Reinhard
- Philip Noah Schwarz - David Müller
- Nadine Wrietz - Betty Müller
- Uwe Preuss - Dr. Reinhard
- Lisa Bitter - Dr. Julia Mann
- Jürgen Tonkel - Herr Petry
