= Meine schönsten Jahre =

- Country of origin: Germany

Meine schönsten Jahre is a German television series.

== See also ==
- List of German television series
