= Heiter bis Wolkig =

2012 German film

- Directed by: Marco Petry
- Written by: Axel Staeck
- Starring: Max Riemelt; Elyas M'Barek; Jessica Schwarz; Anna Fischer
- Distributed by: Constantin Film
- Release date: 6 September 2012
- Language: German

Heiter bis Wolkig (English title: Partly Sunny) is a 2012 German comedy-drama film directed by Marco Petry and starring Max Riemelt, Elyas M'Barek, Jessica Schwarz and Anna Fischer.

== Plot ==
Tim and his friend Can (Elyas M’Barek) go to bars and pretend that one is looking for a date for his friend, who is supposedly deathly ill, and needs one last roll in the hay. Thus Tim (Max Riemelt) meets Marie (Anna Fischer) and they fall in love. Marie must care for her older, ill sister Edda (Jessica Schwarz) who spends a lot of time in bed awaiting death. Marie still believes that Tim has fatal cancer, but Edda (who can judge from her own experience) knows that Tim is putting on an act.

== Cast ==
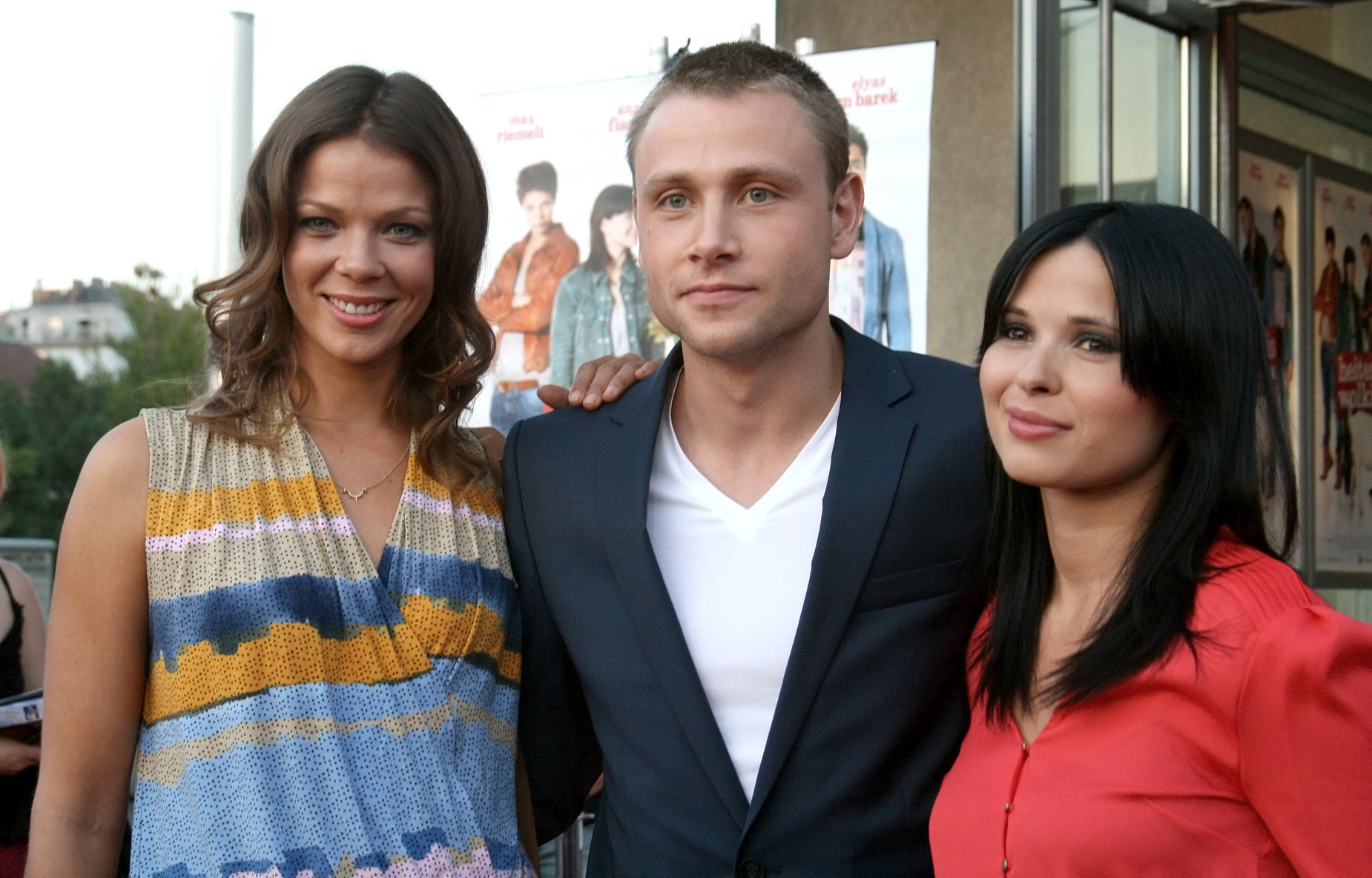
Jessica Schwarz, Anna Fischer and Max Riemelt at the Austrian premiere of Heiter bis wolkig

- Max Riemelt as Tim
- Elyas M'Barek as Can
- Jessica Schwarz as Edda
- Anna Fischer as Marie
- Dieter Tappert as Paul
- Johann von Bülow as Dr. Seibold
- Stephan Luca as Thomas
- Johannes Kienast as Holger
