= Fack ju Göhte 2 =

2015 film directed by Bora Dağtekin

- Theatrical release poster
- Directed by: Bora Dağtekin
- Written by: Bora Dagtekin
- Produced by: Lena Schömann
- Starring: Elyas M'Barek; Jella Haase; Karoline Herfurth
- Cinematography: Andreas Berger
- Edited by: Charles Ladmiral
- Music by: Beckmann; Djorkaeff; Beatzarre
- Production company: Constantin Film
- Distributed by: Constantin Film
- Release date: 7 September 2015
- Running time: 115 minutes
- Country: Germany
- Language: German
- Box office: US$125 million

Fack ju Göhte 2 (intentional misspelling of "Fuck you, Goethe") is a 2015 German comedy film directed by Bora Dağtekin and starring Elyas M'Barek, Karoline Herfurth and Jella Haase, while upcoming actors Max von der Groeben and Volker Bruch appear as supporting roles. The film, produced by Constantin Film, is the sequel to the 2013 film Fack ju Göhte. It premiered on 7 September 2015 in Munich and was released nationwide three days later. It was released in the United States under the title Suck Me Shakespeer 2.

In this film, Zeki and his students travel to Thailand in order to create a partnership with a local school and improve their own school's ranking in the process. However, Zeki's own quest to find hidden treasure interferes with these plans.

== Synopsis ==
Zeki is not satisfied with his new work at the Goethe-Gesamtschule. Having to get up early and correcting exams annoys him. He finds a bag of diamonds in his old criminal partner's car and hides it in a stuffed school mascot.

Lisi fills a bag with old toys in their house (including the stuffed mascot) and donates it to a neighboring school's toy drive, to be sent to Thailand.

Director Gerster wants to improve the image of the school to be a symbol of the new public campaign. She wants to take away the partnership from the Schiller gymnasium with a school in Thailand.

So Zeki, Lisi and the 10/B class go on a school trip to Thailand to a remote village where Zeki hopes to find the diamonds. One of the students places a water bottle shaped like a grenade inside Lisi's suitcase. She is arrested and prevented from leaving the country. Zeki falls unconscious after taking pain medication. Upon arriving in Thailand, the students (dragging a cart with Zeki's body) find they have rented a cheap bus without a driver. Chantal vlogs the journey.

Danger drives them to a bar with strippers where Zeki wakes up. Zeki brings order back to the group, including putting an ankle bracelet on Danger. They continue on their scheduled trip.

They arrive at the campsite with the partner school and find that most have not brought the right materials. They find the warehouse holding their school's donations and break in, but are chased away by a group of students with clown masks.

The next day the group is vising a temple where Chantal vandalizes the artwork, they find the other school's group. Zeki demands info about the plush mascot from a teacher and they get into a fight.

His students kidnap and torture a girl from the other school and she gives them information about where the plush is. They find the diamonds and use them against Zeki.

Upon his awakening, Danger and Chantal escape on a motorboat, only for Zeki to attach himself to its parasail and pull himself towards them. Losing control of the boat, they jump out and it crashes, scattering the diamonds in the water.

Zeki gets drunk while riding an inner tube and is knocked unconscious after a monkey throws rocks at him. The other school's students (along with some Thai kids) raid the camp and steal their valuables. When they try to return to the site of the sunken boat to look for the diamonds, they are again ambushed by the Thai kids. After the German ringleader is impressed by Zeki's tactics, they eventually strike a deal to work together to find the diamonds in exchange for McDonald's coupons. The kids are very poor and live in a cave, most being orphans from the 2004 Indian Ocean earthquake and tsunami.

Relations improve and eventually Zeki gets everyone's cellphones back. He sends positive messages to all their parents in order to improve their relationships. Chanti tries to seduce Etienne, a classmate with Asperger syndrome.

After the diamonds are all found and the kids get their McDonald's, they find that the kids are growing marijuana for the company, but remain in poverty since the company keeps the profits. Since he had a similar past, Zeki sets fire to the entire weed lab, and the teacher who fought Zeki falls unconscious while trying to save it. The girls take staged nudes with him which Zeki uses to blackmail him into leaving and giving up the partnership.

Together, they build a proper home for the Thai kids and return home. Lisi and Zeki star in a promotional ad for their school.

An anonymous message tells Zeki to come to the school in the middle of the night for an important transaction. He is pranked again by his students, who stuff him naked in the vending machine, with a label conveniently placed to hide his penis. The next morning, he is ridiculed by huge groups of students and Chantal, who films the altercation for YouTube.

== Cast ==
- Elyas M'Barek as Zeki Müller
- Karoline Herfurth as Elisabeth "Lisi" Schnabelstedt
- Jana Pallaske as Charlie
- Katja Riemann as Gudrun Gerster
- Volker Bruch as Hauke Wölki
- Jella Haase as Chantal
- Alwara Höfels as Caro Meyer
- Rouven Blessing as Student
- Max von der Groeben as Danger
- Uschi Glas as Ingrid Leimbach-Knorr
- Anna Lena Klenke as Laura
- Christoph Schechinger as Police Officer Schneider
- Gizem Emre as Zeynep
- Michael Maertens as Eckhard Badebrecht
- Zsa Zsa Inci Bürkle as Silke
- Luise von Finckh as Charlotte
- Bernd Stegemann as Gundlach
- Saichia Wongwirot as Museum Guard
- Enissa Amani as Stewardess
- Aram Arami as Burak
- Farid Bang as Paco
- Johannes Nussbaum as Cedric
- Lucas Reiber as Etienne
- Runa Greiner as Meike
- K.M. Lo as Director Mr. Long
- Emma Voltmer as Naomi
- Niklas Nißl as Torben
- Maximilian Waldmann as Noel
- Omar Azaitar as Musti

== Production ==
=== Casting ===
Elyas M'Barek, Karoline Herfurth and Jella Haase reprise their main roles from the first film. Katja Riemann, Max von der Groeben, Gizem Emre, Aram Arami appear as well. Volker Bruch was cast as the new teacher Hauke Wölki.

=== Filming ===
Filming took place in Munich and Berlin. The Lise-Meitner-Gymnasium in Unterhaching served as the backdrop of the Goethe-Gesamtschule. Some parts were also shot in Thailand, among others in Bangkok.

== Release ==
The premiere was held at the Mathäser Cinema in Munich on 7 September 2015. It was released in cinemas on 10 September.

== Reception ==
The film had 2.1 million admissions in its opening weekend in Germany, a record for a German film. After six weeks, it was the highest-grossing German film in Germany and went on to gross $65.2 million. As of 2026, the film is the most successful German film of the 2010s and the third most successful German film since 1990.

== Soundtrack ==
1. Lena Meyer-Landrut – Wild & Free
2. Djorkaeff, Beatzarre – Fack ju Göhte 2 Beat
3. Walk off the Earth – Rule The World
4. Charli XCX – Famous
5. Djorkaeff, Beatzarre – It's Gonna Be Alright
6. Lunchmoney Lewis – Bills
7. Djorkaeff, Beatzarre – Pausenhof Beat
8. Olly Murs – Wrapped Up
9. Carly Rae Jepsen – "Call Me Maybe"
10. Djorkaeff, Beatzarre – Diamanten Beat
11. Nitro – Get It Up
12. Nitro – Wilding Out
13. Jason Derulo – "Talk Dirty (Jason Derulo song)"
14. B-Case – Sicherheitskontrolle Beat
15. Djorkaeff, Beatzarre – Mcdive Beat
16. Djorkaeff, Beatzarre – Here Comes The Sun
17. Flipsyde – Laserbeam
18. OneRepublic –"Counting Stars"
19. Djorkaeff, Beatzarre – Kannst Du Mich Verstehen Beat
20. Djorkaeff, Beatzarre – Uschi auf Lsd Beat
21. Sigma – Changing
22. Janieck Devy – Don't Give Up On Us
