= Arved Birnbaum =

German actor (1962–2021)

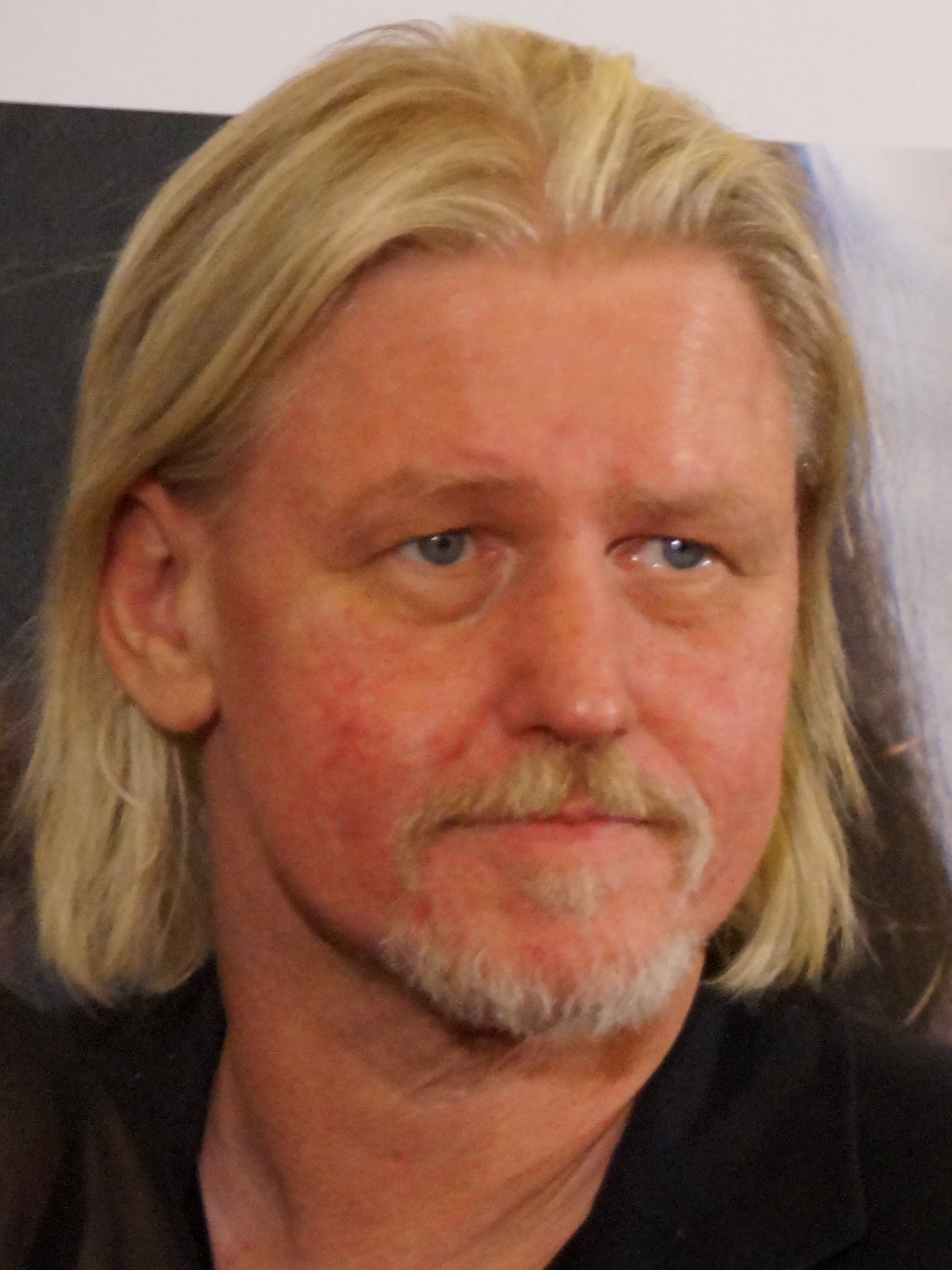
Birnbaum at the German premiere of The Lies of the Victors – The Lies of the Victors in the Lichtburg Essen in 2015

Arved Birnbaum (1962 – 24 October 2021) was a German actor who was mostly known to audiences worldwide as Max Riemelt's down to earth senior in Dennis Gansel's vampire thriller/drama We Are The Night. He played over 60 roles in film and television since 1999.

== Filmography ==
Year	Title	Role	Notes
1999	Das Gelbe vom Ei	1.Polizist	TV movie
2000	Kanak Attack	Gefängniswärter	
2001	Sass	SS Mann 1	
2001	Westend	Fränk	
2001	Der Zimmerspringbrunnen		
2003	Science Fiction	Jörg	
2003	Narren	Heinzelmann 2	
2003	Gate to Heaven	Border policemen	
2004	Großstadtrevier	Trapp	1 episode
2004	My Brother Is a Dog	Maler #2	
2005	Gisela	Car Owner	
2005	Cologne P.D.	Winfried Hohnbach	1 episode
2006	Emma's Bliss	Karl	
2006	SOKO Wismar		2 episodes
2006	Lieben	Arved	
2007	Ein Fall für zwei		3 episodes
2008	Stolberg	Bernhard Nissl	1 episode
2008	SOKO Kitzbühel		2 episodes
2009	Parkour	Frankie	
2010	Im Angesicht des Verbrechens	Nico Roeber	8 episodes
2010	Max Schmeling	Hans von Tschammer und Osten	
2010	We Are the Night	Lummer	
2011	Auschwitz	SS-Commander	
2011	BloodRayne: The Third Reich	Director	
2011	Blubberella	Director	
2011	Bella Block	Hauke Kreinsen	1 episode
2011	Hotel Lux	Obersturmbannführer	
2014	Notruf Hafenkante	Volker Beermann	1 episode
2014	Die Chefin	Peter Seiler	1 episode
2014	The Lies of the Victors	Carlo Bühler	
2015	Weinberg	Zepter	6 episodes
2016	NSU German History X	Police officer Stregda	1 episode
2018	Liliane Susewind - Ein tierisches Abenteuer	Bürgermeister Beauregard Gockel	
2020	Barbarians	Aldarich	3 episodes
