= Tom Schilling =

German actor (born 1982)

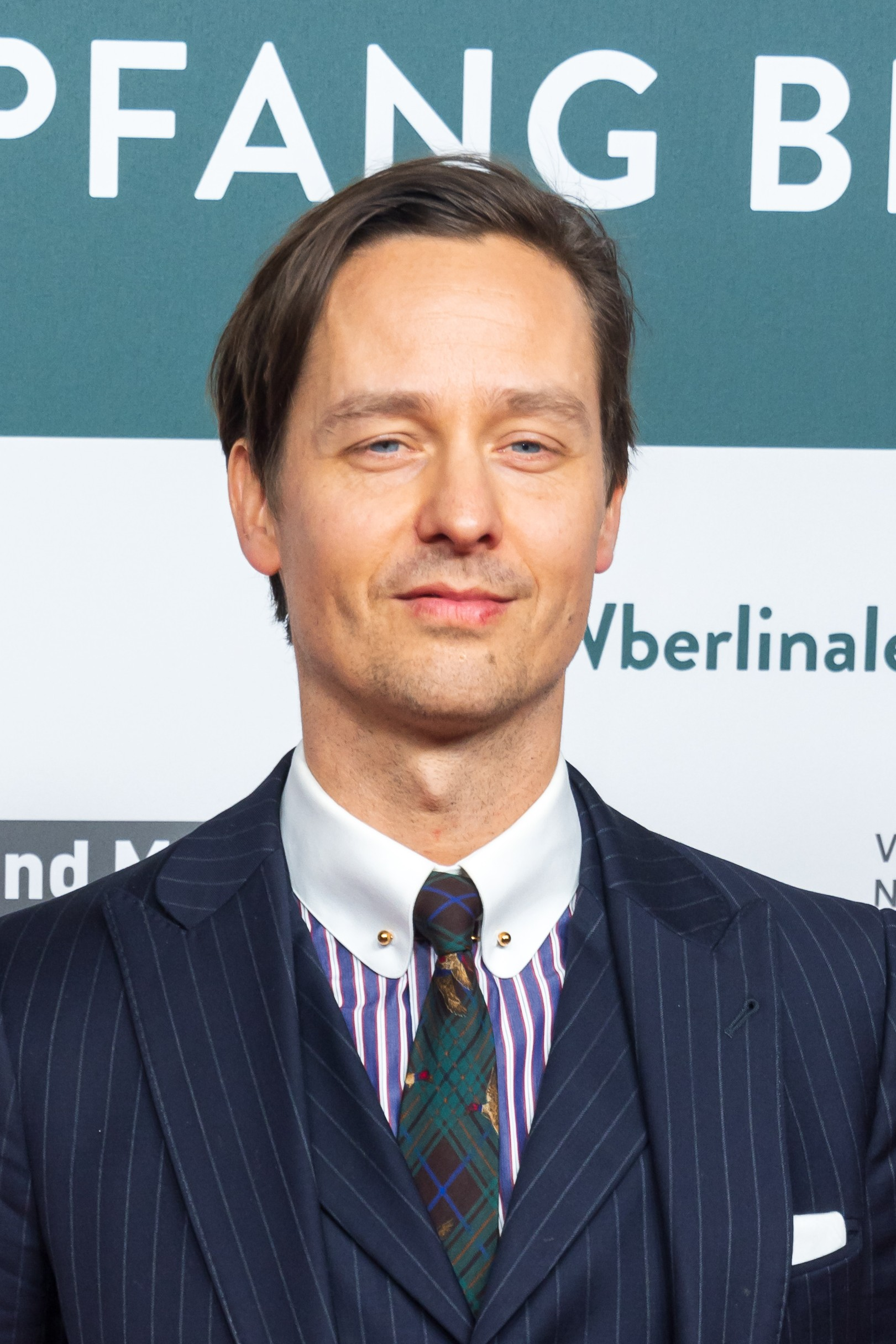
- Schilling in 2023
- Born: 10 February 1982 (age 44); East Berlin, East Germany
- Occupation: Actor
- Years active: 1996–present
- Spouse: Annie Mosebach
- Children: 3

Tom Schilling (born 10 February 1982) is a German film and television actor.

== Life and acting career ==
Schilling grew up in the formerly East German borough of Berlin Mitte. He was discovered at the age of 12 by stage director Thomas Heise, and cast in the stage play Im Schlagschatten des Mondes (Under the shadow of the Moon) at the Berliner Ensemble theatre company, which he stayed with for the next four years to play in other productions as well. Acting jobs earned him enough money to move out of his parents' home when he was 18 and still at school. He left school with an Abitur certificate.

Schilling's screen acting debut was in 1996, when he appeared in the Sat.1 TV series Hallo, Onkel Doc! at the age of 14. He was later cast in the theatrical film Paradise Mall (1999) where he played alongside Franka Potente, Daniel Brühl and Heiner Lauterbach, but the breakthrough for him came with his performance in Crazy (2000, directed by Hans-Christian Schmid), for which he received the Talented Young Actor Award of the Bayerischer Filmpreis.

In the critically well-received 2004 film Before the Fall (German title: Napola – Elite für den Führer, directed by Dennis Gansel) Schilling appeared alongside Max Riemelt as a young and fragile student at a Nazi elite school (Napola). In 2006, he received a scholarship for the Lee Strasberg Institute in New York, where he studied for a semester.

Schilling was later given the role of the young Adolf Hitler in Urs Odermatt's 2009 film Mein Kampf (the UK DVD release is marketed as Dawn of Evil: Rise of the Reich), co-starring Götz George.

Schilling originally wanted to become a painter and study art after school. In a 2008 interview he said he was not much of an extrovert, and that to him having to deliver oneself up on a day-to-day basis was a major disadvantage of being in the acting profession.

In 2006, Schilling had a son by a woman whose name is not known. In spring 2014 he and his partner, assistant director Annie Mosebach, had a son, followed by a daughter in January 2017. In early 2019, Schilling and Mosebach got married.

== Filmography ==
- 1996: Hallo, Onkel Doc! (TV series), episode: Manege frei
- 1996: Für alle Fälle Stefanie (TV series), episode: Rettung des Retters
- 1998: Der heiße Genuss (short film)
- 1999: Tatort (TV series), episode: Kinder der Gewalt
- 1999: Paradise Mall
- 2000: Crazy
- 2000: Exit to Heaven
- 2001: Tatort (TV series), episode: Tot bist Du!
- 2001: Heart Over Head
- 2002: Fetisch (short film)
- 2002: Mehmet (short film)
- 2002: Schlüsselkinder (short film)
- 2002: Weil ich gut bin
- 2002: Weichei (short film)
- 2003: Play It Loud! (Verschwende deine Jugend)
- 2004: Agnes and His Brothers (Agnes und seine Brüder)
- 2004: Egoshooter
- 2004: Kurz – Der Film
- 2004: Before the Fall (Napola – Elite für den Führer)
- 2005: Die letzte Schlacht
- 2005: Tatort (TV series), episode: Wo ist Max Gravert?
- 2006: Einfache Leute
- 2006: Atomised / The Elementary Particles (Elementarteilchen)
- 2006: Joy Division
- 2006: Black Sheep
- 2006: Wigald (short film)
- 2007: Pornorama
- 2007: KDD – Kriminaldauerdienst (TV series)
- 2007: Tour Excess
- 2007: Why Men Don't Listen and Women Can't Read Maps (Warum Männer nicht zuhören und Frauen schlecht einparken)
- 2008: Robert Zimmermann Is Tangled Up in Love (Robert Zimmermann wundert sich über die Liebe)
- 2008: Tatort (TV crime series), episode: Der frühe Abschied
- 2008: Mordgeständnis
- 2008: The Baader Meinhof Complex (theatrical film, drama)
- 2009: Dawn of Evil: Rise of the Reich (Mein Kampf), inspired by a stage play by George Tabori
- 2009: Bloch (TV series), episode: Tod eines Freundes
- 2009: Ice Fever (German/Italian TV film based on Ken Follett's novel Whiteout)
- 2010: Tatort (TV series), episode: Am Ende des Tages
- 2010: Ich, Ringo und das Tor zur Welt (TV biopic)
- 2011: Polizeiruf 110 (TV series), episode: Die verlorene Tochter
- 2011: Tatort (TV series), episode: Auskreuzung
- 2012: A Coffee in Berlin (theatrical film, comedy/drama)
- 2012: Ludwig II. (theatrical film, period drama)
- 2013: Hotel Adlon: A Family Saga (TV mini-series)
- 2013: The Tragedy of a Simple Man (TV film)
- 2013: Shark Alarm at Müggel Lake (theatrical film, comedy)
- 2013: Unsere Mütter, unsere Väter (TV mini-series) Also broadcast on BBC 2(UK) in April/May 2014 as Generation War.
- 2014: Who Am I – No System is Safe
- 2014: Posthumous
- 2014: Suite Francaise
- 2015: Woman in Gold
- 2015: Punk Berlin 1982 (Tod den Hippies!! Es lebe der Punk)
- 2016: Point Blank (TV film)
- 2016: NSU German History X
- 2017: The Same Sky (TV Series), 6 episodes on Netflix
- 2018: Never Look Away
- 2019: Lara
- 2019: The Goldfish (Die Goldfische)
- 2019: Brecht
- 2021: Fabian – Going to the Dogs
- 2024: A Million Minutes
- 2024: Murder Mindfully (Television Series)
- 2026: Ach, diese Lücke, diese entsetzliche Lücke

== Audio plays ==
- 2003: Die Meute der Mórrígan (The Hounds of the Morrigan) – role: Pidge
- 2003: Das Geheimnis der verborgenen Insel (Monster Mission)
- 2003: Hanni und Nanni und ihre Gäste (based on Enid Blyton's book series St. Clare's) – role: Peter
- 2008: Jodi Picoult: Neunzehn Minuten (Nineteen Minutes) – role: Peter Houghton (audiobook), publisher: der Hörverlag, ISBN 978-3867172523
- 2011: Übernacht – role: Jan
- 2012: Als ich meine Eltern verließ – audiobook recording of the novel by Michel Rostain (orig. French title: Le Fils)

== Awards ==
- 2000: Bavarian Film Awards, Germany: Young Talented Actor award for his performance in Crazy
- 2005: Undine Awards, Germany: Best young character actor award (Bester jugendlicher Charakterdarsteller) for his performance in Before the Fall
- 2005: Undine Awards, Germany: Audience award (Zuschauerpreis) for his performance in Before the Fall
- 2008: Wiesbaden Fernsehkrimi-Festival: Deutscher Fernsehkrimipreis (German crime fiction TV award) special award for outstanding performance in Tatort – Der frühe Abschied
- 2012: Oldenburg International Film Festival: Seymour Cassel Award for his performance in A Coffee in Berlin
- 2013: Bavarian Film Awards, Germany: Best male actor award (Bester Darsteller) for his performance in A Coffee in Berlin
- 2013: German Film Awards (Goldene Lola): Best male actor in a leading role (for his performance in A Coffee in Berlin)
