= The Fourth State =

- Theatrical release poster
- Directed by: Dennis Gansel
- Written by: Dennis Gansel; Florian Schumacher
- Produced by: Thomas Peter Friedl; Nina Maag; Nico Hofmann
- Starring: Moritz Bleibtreu; Kasia Smutniak; Max Riemelt; Rade Serbedzija; Stipe Erceg
- Cinematography: Daniel Gottschalk
- Edited by: Jochen Retter
- Music by: Heiko Maile
- Production companies: UFA Cinema; SevenPictures Film
- Distributed by: Universal Pictures International
- Release date: 8 March 2012
- Running time: 115 minutes
- Country: Germany
- Languages: English; Russian; German; Chechen
- Box office: $1.459.000

The Fourth State (German: Die vierte Macht) is a 2012 German psychological thriller film directed by Dennis Gansel and starring Moritz Bleibtreu, Kasia Smutniak, Max Riemelt, Rade Serbedzija, Mark Ivanir and Isabella Vinet. It premiered in Germany on 8 March 2012. The working title was The Year of the Snake.

== Plot ==
The film opens with a man leaving his Moscow apartment building. On his way out he notices strange activity in the basement, but ignores it. As he leaves, the entire apartment building is destroyed in an explosion.

13 years later, the German tabloid journalist Paul Jensen (Moritz Bleibtreu) arrives in Moscow to work on a magazine owned by his late father's friend Onjegin (Rade Serbedzija). One day while buying a sandwich Paul witnesses the customer in front of him being assassinated in the street. Paul's photographer partner Dima (Max Riemelt) tells Paul that the victim was a famous journalist whose TV show got canceled due to him being critical of the government.

Paul meets up with the journalist Katja (Kasia Smutniak) in the lunchroom. Katja wants to publish an article about the assassinated journalist, but Jensen's editor does not dare to. Paul suggests that Katja rewrite the article and that he then publishes it in the celebrity section on account of the journalist's fame. Paul and Katja meet at a bar in the evening and Katja reveals that the journalist knew his father. Paul and Katja end up drunk and dance. The following day the two meet at a protest rally and Paul encounters Katja's brother Anatoly (Grigoriy Dobrygin). Police arrive and declare the protest illegal and Paul and Katja leave. They retreat to Paul's apartment and end up making love. The next day Katja finds out that Paul published the article without telling his editor. The editor tells Paul to never do anything like it again as they are now at risk of being shut down. Dima finds out about Paul's relationship with Katja and warns him not to have serious relationships with Russian women much to Paul's confusion.

Paul later meets with Katja at a party and she seems distracted and nervous. As they walk past a subway station a man approaches Paul for a lighter and Katja runs into the subway. Seconds later the subway is destroyed by an explosion that throws Paul through the air and knocks him unconscious. Paul wakes up at a hospital and is met by police. He is told that a backpack he helped carry for Katja contained explosives and that Katja died in the explosion in the subway. Paul is charged for terrorism and is presented with evidence that he is unable to prove false.

Onjegin is allowed to meet Paul and tells him he will be sent to jail while waiting for his trial, which is seven months away. Paul is sent to the prison known as "Little Chechnya" due to the large number of Chechen people held captive there. Paul is attacked and beaten up by an inmate but is saved by and taken under the wings of Aslan (Mark Ivanir) who serves as the leader of the Chechens. In a conversation Aslan tells Paul that he knew his father, Norbert Jensen (Björn von der Wellen). During the following days Aslan tells Paul about how Norbert interviewed him, how his and several of the terrorists in the prison lost their families in the invasion and how he became a terrorist. Aslan also teaches Paul about the relationship between oil, terrorism and money.

One night Aslan is taken out and beaten by the guards. Aslan suspects a prison snitch is informing the prison commander (Merab Ninidze). Aslan finds the snitch and Paul is forced to watch as the inmates kill him. Aslan is then taken away and murdered. Paul decides to sign a contract that will have him expelled to Germany in exchange for him declaring having been treated fairly by the authorities. Paul is driven away but when he realizes he is not being taken to the airport he jumps out from the car and outruns his guards.

Paul then meets with Dima and is hunted down by the authorities. He later finds out that Katja is alive and was tricked by authorities to trap him in a plot to get him arrested. He confronts Onjegin with evidence he retrieves from his flat belonging to his late father about authorities' plot to hide secrets behind the start of Chechnya's war. Onjegin arranges for him to leave the country using his money and contacts – he bids farewell to Katja and upon landing in Germany he watches the live feed on the TV about Onjegin's assassination.

== Cast ==
- Moritz Bleibtreu as Paul Jensen
- Kasia Smutniak as Katja
- Rade Serbedzija as Onjegin
- Max Riemelt as Dima
- Mark Ivanir as Aslan
- Stipe Erceg as Vladimir
- Reiner Schöne as Sokolow
- Ivan Vrgoc as Sergej
- Isabella Vinet as Jekaterina
- Michael Ihnow as FSB officer
- Merab Ninidze as Sagalayev
- Cosima Shaw as Andrea Berger
- Björn von der Wellen as Norbert Jensen
- Marco Ammer as Chief Waiter Pjotr
- Grigoriy Dobrygin as Anatoly
- David Akinloye as White House Press Secretary
- Jean Denis Römer as FSB Agent
- Alexandra Starnitzky as 1st Flight Assistant
- Dennis Gansel as Taxi Driver

== Production ==
Dennis Gansel got the basic idea for the film after the broadcast of Das Phantom, and Gansel mentioned that they have a similar theme. The film was shot in Berlin and Ukraine. A few scenes were shot in Moscow, and a fake script was presented to the authorities to get permits without problems due to the political nature of the actual script. The editor was Jochen Retter who edited several of director Dennis Gansel's previous short films as well as his debut film Das Phantom and Before the Fall. The film is the fifth and as of 2024 the final collaboration between Gansel and actor Max Riemelt who had starred in every one of Gansel's feature films since Mädchen, Mädchen. Gansel stated that the film Three Days of the Condor was an influence for him while making the film.

== Critical response ==
Variety called the film "a sleek, solid but not exceptional Euro thriller" and praised the film's cinematography and score. Scene Stealers gave a favourable review and praised the actors and the director for making the film feel frighteningly realistic. Cinematographer Daniel Gottschalk was nominated for a Deutscher Filmpreis for his cinematography.
