= Mathias Herrmann =

German actor

Mathias Herrmann (born 16 July 1962 in Friedberg, West Germany) is a German television actor.

== Career ==
He studied acting from 1983 to 1986 at the rewarded Otto-Falckenberg-School in Munich. Parallel to his studies he already played at the Munich Kammerspiele. His film debut he had given in 1987 in Ralf Huettner's successful movie The Girl with the Lighters.

After this, he had many engagements at theatres in Bremen, Bonn, Mannheim and Basel, where he played many leads in which he excited the audience, a.o. Prinz von Homburg, Clavigo, Der Stellvertreter and Ghetto. He got international attention with the lead role of captured German soldier Beck in the Dutch WW2 series De Partizanen (The Partisans), which received many awards and was nominated for an emmy. Shortly after this he also had a successful outcome in television in the ZDF series Ein Fall für Zwei. Millions of people were watching him in the role of Dr. Johannes Voss.

Since then Mathias Herrmann was playing leads in many successful and awarded German TV movies, like Messerscharf (Angeliki Antoniou), E-mail an Gott (Bernd Böhlich), Sperling (Peter Schulze-Rohr), Rent a Baby (Christoph Schrewe), Das Phantom (Dennis Gansel), Das falsche Opfer (Ulrich Stark) and Dieter Kehler's film version of Rosamunde Pilcher's Land der Sehnsucht. He has performed readings from authors such as Villon, Goethe and Schiller, Hebel and Brecht, Agota Kristof and Robert Gernhardt for many years.

== Filmography ==
Year	Title	Role	Notes
1987	Das Mädchen mit den Feuerzeugen	Hotelgast	
1992	Die Wahrheit über die Stasi	IM Ausland	
1995	Der Leihmann	Kandidat	
2002	Der Unbestechliche	Sand	
2005	Joyeux Noël	L'officer allemand au quartier général	
2009	John Rabe	Werner Fließ	
2010	Pius XII: Under the Roman Sky	Karl Wolff	
2012	The Adventures of Huck Finn	Auctioneer	
2018	As Green as It Gets	Käufer	
2019	All I Never Wanted	Christian Mops	
2020	Limbo	Frank Mailing	
2020	Der Überläufer	Helmut Poppek	
