= Fourth State =

Fourth state or Fourth State may refer to:

- The Fourth State, 2012 German film
- The fourth state of matter
- Georgia (U.S. state), one of the original Thirteen Colonies, and the fourth to ratify the Constitution of the United States of America in 1788
- Puebla, admitted to the United Mexican States as its fourth state in 1823

== See also ==
- Fourth Estate
