= Durmaz =

Durmaz is a Turkish surname. Notable people with the surname include:

- Berkan Durmaz (born 1997), Turkish basketball player
- David Durmaz (born 1981), Swedish footballer
- Ercan Durmaz (born 1965), Turkish-German actor
- Jimmy Durmaz (born 1989), Swedish footballer
