= Jennifer Ulrich =

German actress (born 1984)

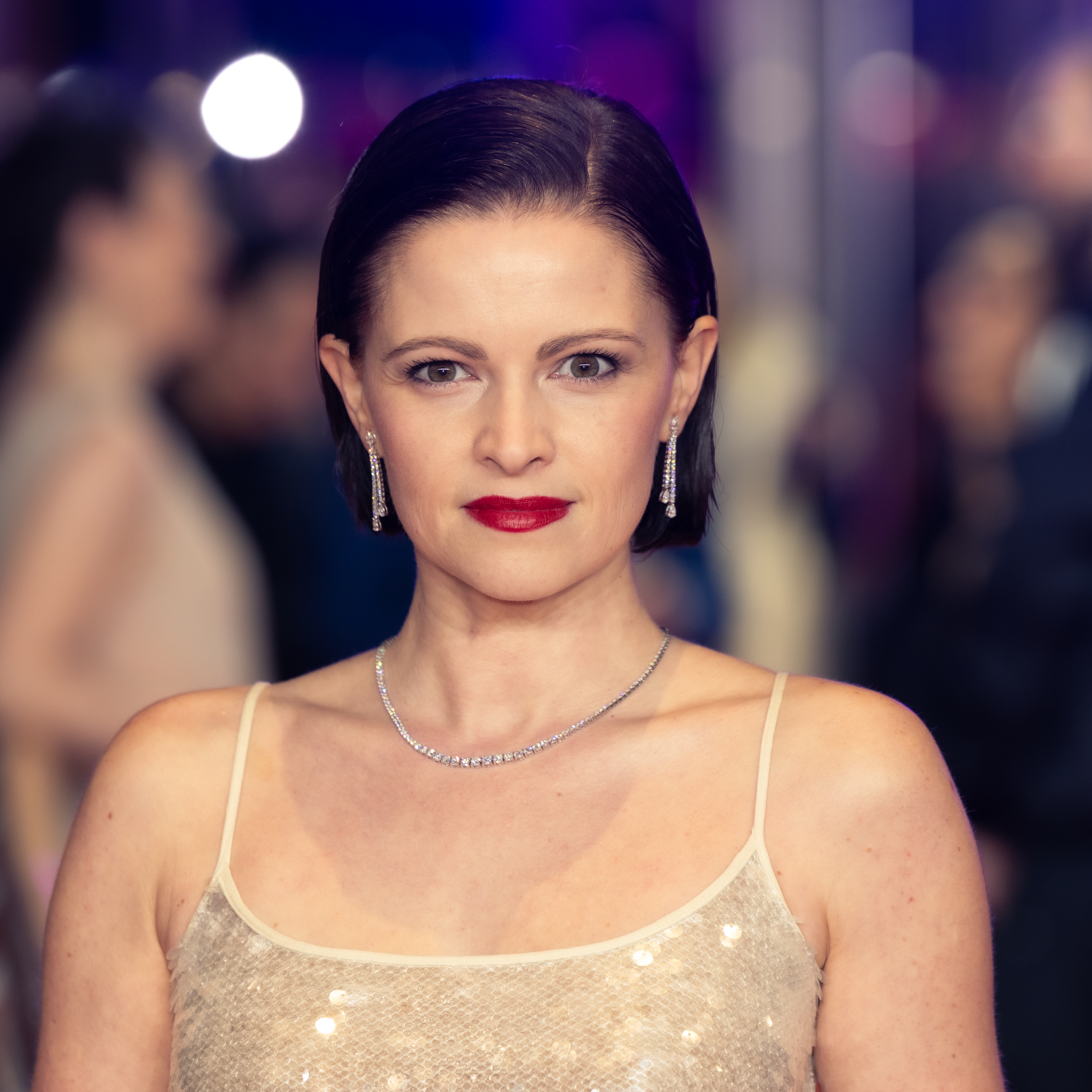
- Ulrich in 2026
- Born: 18 October 1984 (age 41); East Berlin, East Germany
- Occupation: actress
- Years active: 2002–present

Jennifer Ulrich (born 18 October 1984) is a German actress who has starred in such films as The Wave and We Are The Night. She was born in Lichtenberg, Berlin.

== Career ==
Jennifer Ulrich started her actress career with Big Girls Don't Cry, released in 2002, in which she played the role of Yvonne. After participating in films such as The Elementary Particles in 2006, and Seven Days Sunday in 2007,. She played the female lead role in 2008's film The Wave and in the vampire film We Are the Night. Both were directed by Dennis Gansel. She is a fan of genre films, like horror.

== Filmography ==
| Year | Film | Role | Other notes |
|---|---|---|---|
| 2002 | Big Girls Don't Cry | Yvonne | Debut |
| 2002 | Liberated Zone | Katja | |
| 2003 | Berlin, eine Stadt sucht den Mörder | | |
| 2004 | The School Trip | | Television film |
| 2006 | The Elementary Particles | Johanna | |
| 2006 | The Cloud | Meike | |
| 2006 | Crocodile Alert | | |
| 2007 | Seven Days Sunday | Ella | |
| 2008 | The Wave | Karo | Lead role |
| 2008 | H3 – Halloween Horror Hostel | | Television film |
| 2009 | Tatort: Familienaufstellung | | |
| 2009 | Puss in Boots | la princesse Frieda | |
| 2010 | We Are the Night | Charlotte | Lead role |
| 2011 | 205 - Room of Fear | Katrin | Main Character |
| 2012 | Diaz – Don’t Clean Up This Blood | Alma Koch | |
| 2013 | A Royal Affair | Lissie Lensen | Television film |
| 2013 | Open Desert | Lucy | |
| 2014 | Alarm für Cobra 11 – Die Autobahnpolizei | Nicole Fiedler | TV series |
| 2014 | Meet Me in Montenegro | Friederike | |
| 2019–20 | Dignity | Anke Meier | TV series, Main Character |
