= Beloved Berlin Wall =

- Theatrical release poster
- Directed by: Peter Timm
- Written by: Peter Timm
- Starring: Felicitas Woll; Maxim Mehmet; Anna Fischer; Thomas Thieme; Karl Kranzkowski; Margarita Broich; Gisela Trowe
- Cinematography: Achim Poulheim
- Edited by: Barbara Hennings
- Music by: Karim Sebastian Elias
- Production companies: Relevant Film; Tradewind Pictures
- Distributed by: Warner Bros. Pictures
- Release date: 19 November 2009
- Country: Germany
- Language: German
- Box office: $293,714

Beloved Berlin Wall (German: Liebe Mauer) is a 2009 German romantic comedy drama film written and directed by Peter Timm. It is set during the fall of the Berlin Wall.

== Cast ==
- Felicitas Woll as Franzi
- Maxim Mehmet as Sascha
- Anna Fischer as Uschi
- Thomas Thieme as Police officer
- Karl Kranzkowski as Charlie
- Margarita Broich as Tante Jutta
- Gisela Trowe as Oma Emma
