= Nadeshda Brennicke =

German actress, singer and author

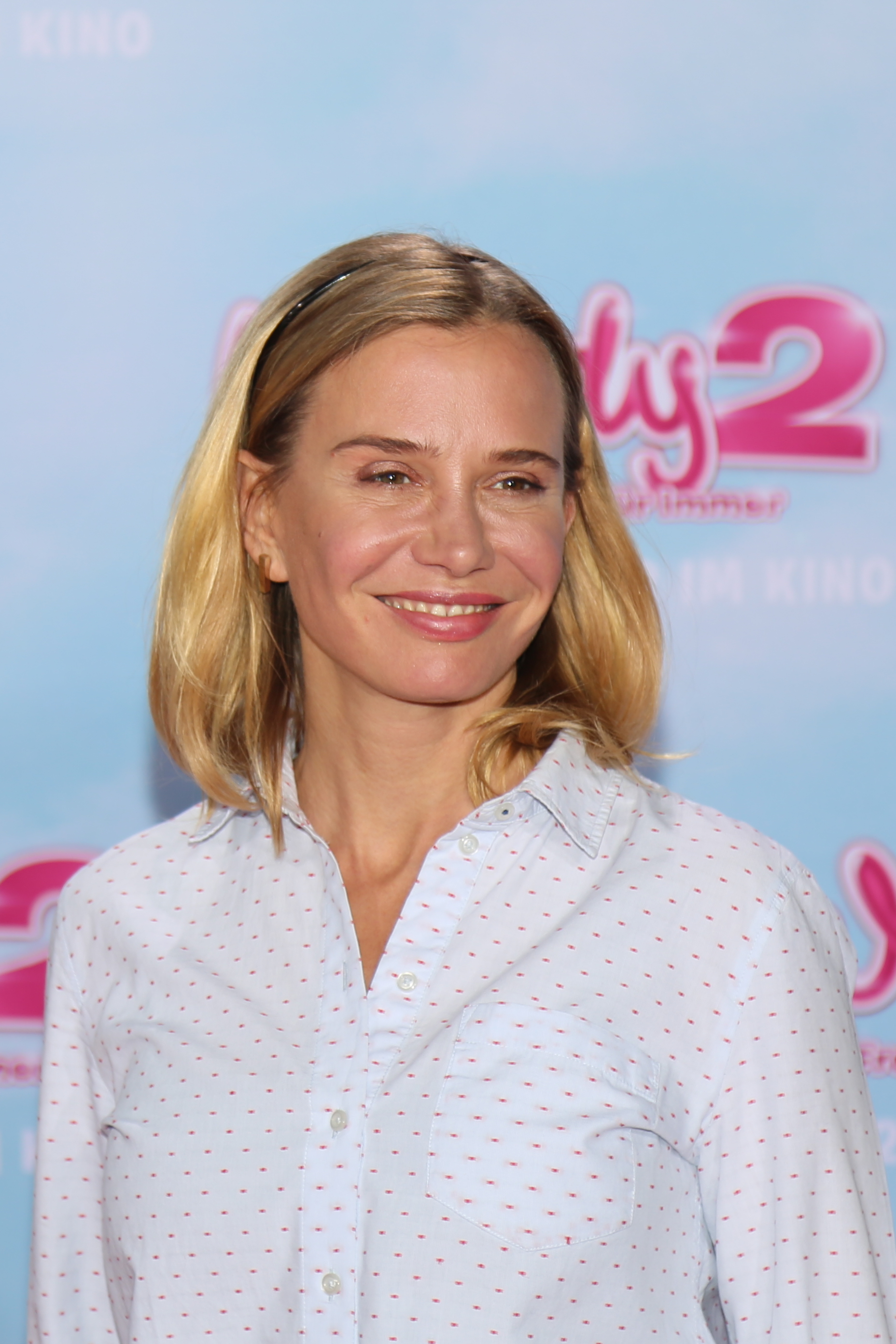
- Brennicke in 2018
- Born: Nadja Therésa Richter; 21 April 1973 (age 53); Freiburg im Breisgau, West Germany
- Occupation: Actress • singer • author
- Years active: 1991–present

Nadeshda Brennicke (born Nadeshda Therésa Richter; 21 April 1973) is a German actress, singer and author.

== Biography ==
Brennicke is the adoptive daughter of TV and voice-over actor Michael Brennicke and her mother is an art dealer. She spent her childhood in Munich. At the age of 15, after 10th grade, she left gymnasium and moved out of her parents’ home in hopes of becoming an actress.

From 1989-91, she attended the Zinner Studio (today the International School for Performance and Acting). In 1992 she formed the singing duo Charade with Jennifer Böttcher, which was produced by Stefan Zauner and Aron Strobel of the band Münchener Freiheit. The singles All of You and The Colour of Your Eyes reached number 67 and 60 of the German charts.

In her senior year of drama school Brennicke received the lead role of Tina in the German film comedy Manta – Der Film. Other performances for television productions followed. She gained more recognition for her role as investigator Tessa Norman in the series The Streets of Berlin.

She sings and composes her own songs; she sang among others credits in the Polizeiruf 110 episode Silicone Walli and in the film Antibodies.

== Personal life ==
Brennicke has one son Nikita who was born in 1997 whom she raised as a single mother. Between 2007 and 2020, Brennicke lived on a farm in Brandenburg where she raises Arabian thoroughbred horses, oriental cats and a Great Dane.

She was in a relationship for two years (2012-14) with Vietnamese cameraman Ngô Thế Châu.

== Filmography ==
=== Film ===
- 1991: Manta – Der Film
- 1996: Workaholic
- 1999: Curiosity & the Cat
- 2000: Kanak Attack
- 2001: Planet Alex
- 2002: Tattoo
- 2004: C(r)ook
- 2005: The Wedding Party
- 2005: Antikörper
- 2006: Kahlschlag
- 2008: Innocence
- 2013: Dampfnudelblues
- 2013: Banklady
- 2015: God of Happiness

=== Television ===
- 1993: Magic Müller
- 1993: Ein Zeuge bricht sein Schweigen
- 1994: Im Zweifel für …
- 1994: Kommissar Rex – Im Zeichen des Satans
- 1995: Der Clan der Anna Voss
- 1995: Blindes Vertrauen
- 1995: Vater wider Willen
- 1995: Pilotinnen
- 1996: Alles außer Mord – Blackout
- 1996: Landgang für Ringo (later with the title "Kebab Träume")
- 1996: Workaholic
- 1996–2007: Ein Fall für zwei (3 episodes)
- 1996: Tatort – Krokodilwächter
- 1998: The Sex Thief
- 1999: Tatort – Offene Rechnung
- 1999/2000: Die Straßen von Berlin
- 2000: Tatort – Einsatz in Leipzig
- 2000: Balko – Krapp, verschollen in Berlin
- 2000: Das Phantom
- 2001: Stahlnetz – Das gläserne Paradies
- 2002: Polizeiruf 110 – Silikon Walli
- 2002: Hotte in Paradise
- 2003: Geheimnisvolle Freundinnen
- 2003: Affäre zu dritt
- 2004: C(r)ook
- 2004: The Amber Amulet 1 und 2 (Miniseries of 2 parts)
- 2004: Der Weihnachtshund
- 2005: K3 – Kripo Hamburg – Fieber
- 2005: Zwei Weihnachtshunde
- 2005: Meine Schwester und ich
- 2006: My Husband's Getting Married Today
- 2006: Tatort – Feuerkämpfer
- 2006: Eine Frage des Gewissens
- 2006: Bettis Bescherung
- 2006: Partnertausch
- 2006: Kahlschlag
- 2007: Tatort – Die Blume des Bösen
- 2007: Polizeiruf 110 – Tod eines Fahnders
- 2007: Partnertausch
- 2007: Der Mann von gestern
- 2008: Tatort – Krumme Hunde
- 2008: Dekker & Adi
- 2008: Die Frau des Frisörs
- 2008: Zwillingsküsse schmecken besser
- 2008: Darum
- 2009: Der Bär ist los! Die Geschichte von Bruno
- 2009: Frauen wollen mehr
- 2009: Mordkommission Istanbul – Mord am Bosporus
- 2010: Love Is Just a Word
- 2010: Ein starkes Team – (Episode: Im Zwielicht)
- 2010: Donna Leon – Lasset die Kinder zu mir kommen
- 2010: Die Draufgänger
- 2010: 8:28 AM
- 2011: Der Staatsanwalt – Fluch der Bilder
- 2011: Tatort – Rendezvous mit dem Tod
- 2011: Der letzte Bulle – Ich weiß von nichts
- 2011: Sommerlicht
- 2012: Das Traumhotel – Vietnam
- 2012: Wolff – Kampf im Revier
- 2012: Das Geheimnis der Villa Sabrini
- 2012: The Marriage Swindler and His Wife
- 2013: A World Beyond
- 2013: SOKO 5113 – Der Tod des Marquis
- since 2013: Add a Friend
- 2014: Frauenherzen
- 2014: Blütenträume
- 2015: Zwei Familien auf der Palme
- 2015: The Team
- 2015: Wer Wind sät
- 2016: Nord Nord Mord – Clüver und der tote Koch
- 2016: Alarm für Cobra 11 – Die Autobahnpolizei – Tricks
- 2019: Mountain Medic – Preis des Lebens

== Honors ==
- 2001: Adolf-Grimme-Preis, Audience prize of the Marler Gruppe for the role of Anne Schneider in Das Phantom
- 2013: Silver Hugo for Best Actress Chicago International Film Festival for the role of Gisela Werler in Banklady
- 2014: Nominated for the Best German Actress at the Bambi 2014 for the role of Gisela Werler in Banklady
- 2014: Insigne de Cristal de la Meilleure Actrice award for Best Actress at the Festival International du Film Policier de Liège in Lüttich for the leading role in Banklady
