= Martin Goeres =

German actor and stuntman

Martin Goeres (born August 12, 1984) is a German actor and stuntman.

== Biography ==
Born in West Berlin, Goeres started his acting career at the age of 10. Staying in the business throughout his youth, he decided to pursue a career as a stuntman due to his martial arts and fighting skills. Co-founding the 'Perfect Action Stunt Team' also led him to work behind the camera as a pyrotechnican and stunt coordinator. He has since committed himself to extensive study with Giles Foreman, Reuven Adiv, Tony Woolf, renowned acting coach Larry Moss, and others. After several years of working for international productions like "Dracula", "Mission Impossible - Rouge Nation", "Wonder Woman" and others Martin Goeres founded his own full action service company MG ACTION.

== Filmography ==
=== Acting ===
- 1995: Flieg Opa, flieg! (TV Series) - Max Teichmann
- 2001: Heidi M. - Max
- 2003: Familie Dr. Kleist (TV Series, 10 episodes)
- 2004: Before the Fall - Siegfried Gladen
- 2005: The Challenge - Civil War Fighter
- 2006: Winter Journey - Assistent des Botschafters
- 2009: Ninja Assassin
- 2011: Hanna - CIA Agent (uncredited)
- 2011: Don 2 - Jabbar's Goon
- 2015: Victoria - SEK 1
- 2015: What You Want Is Gone Forever - Ariel
- 2015: Kartoffelsalat - Kommissar Kuddel
- 2017: Schneeflöckchen - Gustav

=== SFX & stunt ===
- 2004: Bye Bye Berlusconi
- 2005: V for Vendetta
- 2007: Beyond Remedy aka Fear
- 2007: Speed Racer
- 2007: Valkyrie
- 2008: Ninja Assassin
- 2009: Inglourious Basterds
- 2011: Don 2
