= Single by Contract =

- Film poster
- German: Groupies bleiben nicht zum Frühstück
- Directed by: Marc Rothemund
- Written by: Kristina Magdalena Henn; Lea Schmidbauer
- Produced by: Andreas Ulmke-Smeaton; Ewa Karlström
- Starring: Anna Fischer; Kostja Ullmann
- Music by: Gerd Baumannm; Roland Spremberg
- Production company: Samfilm
- Distributed by: Buena Vista International
- Release date: 16 September 2010
- Running time: 1h 43min
- Country: Germany
- Language: German

Single by Contract (German: Groupies bleiben nicht zum Frühstück [Groupies don't stay for breakfast]) is a 2010 German comedy film directed by Marc Rothemund.

The feature film is based on a screenplay by Kristina Magdalena Henn and Lea Schmidbauer and tells the story of the Berlin schoolgirl Lila, played by Anna Fischer, who falls in love with the aspiring musician Chriz, portrayed by Kostja Ullmann, after returning from an exchange year in the United States — unaware that he is the lead singer of the commercially successful rock band Berlin Mitte.

The project was produced by SamFilm in Munich. Filming took place from August to October 2009 in and around Berlin. In addition to Fischer and Ullmann, the cast included Inka Friedrich, Amber Bongard, Nina Gummich, Roman Knižka, and Ben Braun.

Critics generally reviewed Single By Contract positively and compared the production to the English-language romantic comedy Notting Hill (1999). With more than 600,000 cinema-goers in Germany, the film became the eleventh most successful German production of the 2010 cinema year.

== Cast ==
- Anna Fischer - Lila Lorenz
- Kostja Ullmann - Chriz
- Inka Friedrich - Dr. Angelika Lorenz
- Amber Bongard - Luzy Lorenz
- Nina Gummich - Nike
- Roman Knižka - Paul
- Ben Braun - Tom

== Plot ==
Young Lila (Anna Fischer) returns to Germany after a year-long exchange program in the United States and falls in love with Chriz (Kostja Ullmann). What she does not know is that he is a famous young rock star whose posters cover the walls of her younger sister Luzy’s room. Lila and Chriz first meet in a botanical garden, where Lila is trying to steal a rare plant for a friend. When Chriz tells her that he is the lead singer of the band “Berlin Mitte,” she assumes he is joking. The two spend the evening together, and Lila offers him a place to stay in her sister’s room while Luzy is away on a trip with their mother and her new boyfriend. However, they return earlier than expected, and Luzy discovers her celebrity crush sleeping in her bed. Chriz is already running late and is picked up by his manager Paul and his bodyguard Horst. Lila must now come to terms with who he really is.

Lila’s friend Nike arranges for her to attend an autograph session so she can speak with Chriz again. But in front of the rest of the band and the manager, Chriz treats her like just another fan. Hurt and disappointed, Lila leaves. Shortly afterward, she receives a letter from Chriz containing two concert tickets and an apology. Lila gives the tickets to her sister, but in the end she has to accompany Luzy because she is too young to attend the concert alone. At first skeptical, Lila eventually enjoys herself. During the concert, Chriz performs a song in which she recognizes herself, even mentioning her name, and she forgives him. After the show, the two go out for Japanese food and later end up in Chriz’s hotel room, where Lila stays overnight. The next morning, manager Paul tries to throw her out, saying, “Groupies don’t stay for breakfast,” only to realize that Chriz is genuinely serious about her. He reminds Chriz of his contract, which requires him to remain officially single.

Back home, Lila tells her best friend about the night over the phone, unaware that Luzy is listening. Luzy later tells a friend at school, and by lunchtime the story has spread through the media. For Chriz’s entire team, this becomes a disaster, and they try to portray Lila as someone who fabricated the whole story. Chriz is shocked by how many details the press knows and accuses Lila of selling him out and deliberately hurting him. Lila cannot believe he would think such a thing about her and regrets ever having met him.

Luzy realizes she has made a terrible mistake and confesses to Chriz that she was the one who talked. Chriz immediately rushes to Lila and interrupts her class at school. He tells her that he wants a real relationship, but she remains doubtful. She questions his feelings and cannot imagine how things could work, especially since he is about to leave on a three-month tour through the United States and his band is on the verge of an international breakthrough. Chriz reluctantly accepts her decision and heads to the airport. At the last moment, Lila changes her mind and follows him there. However, the boarding gate has already closed and Chriz is already on the plane. Only because he asks for the aircraft doors to be reopened and casts one final hopeful glance toward the terminal does he spot Lila. The two rush into each other’s arms. Lila tells him that she would like a happy ending after all, to which Chriz replies that this is only the beginning. The film ends with Chriz and Lila singing “Stumblin’ In” together as a duet on the beach.

== Production ==
Single By Contract was based on an idea by the two screenwriters Kristina Magdalena Henn and Lea Schmidbauer. For both women, the project marked their first collaboration on a full-length feature film. After presenting a pitch, they further developed the screenplay together with producers Ewa Karlström and Andreas Ulmke-Smeaton of SamFilm, which later produced the film. Once the second draft of the screenplay had been completed, Marc Rothemund was hired as director. He had previously worked with Karlström and Ulmke-Smeaton on his directorial debut Love Scenes from Planet Earth (1998). Eight additional screenplay versions were written before filming finally began.

A large part of the filming took place at The Ritz-Carlton, Berlin. Principal photography lasted 40 days and began on August 11, 2009, in Berlin. Other filming locations in the capital included the Mercedes-Benz Arena Berlin, Berlin Tegel Airport, the Botanical Garden and Botanical Museum Berlin, and a residential building on Fuggerstraße in the Schöneberg district. The final scene was filmed on October 7, 2009. The production received financial support from the FilmFernsehFonds Bayern (FFFB), the Filmförderungsanstalt (FFA), the German Federal Film Fund (DFFF), and the Medienboard Berlin-Brandenburg (MBB).

The film was originally intended to be titled Alles für Lila, but because of its similarity to the film adaptation Lila, Lila, released the previous year, the title was changed to Groupies bleiben nicht zum Frühstück. The final title comes from a line in the screenplay.

Casting was overseen by Uwe Bünker. Kostja Ullmann had been suggested by Rothemund early in the casting process for the leading role, but after a successful audition he still had to prove his singing abilities. Anna Fischer, on the other hand, was cast relatively late in pre-production because prior commitments had prevented her from attending earlier auditions. She was ultimately hired after a joint screen test with Ullmann. The role of bodyguard Horst was written specifically for Michael Keseroglu at the director’s request after Rothemund had seen his performance in the youth drama Gangs. The production also enlisted Bravo photographer Bernd Jaworek, who not only appeared in a small role in the film but also contributed images for tour posters, promotional posters, and CD covers.

== Music ==
The film score for Single By Contract was composed by Gerd Baumann. Kostja Ullmann, who had never previously been required to sing in a production, took singing lessons specifically to prepare for his role as the lead singer of a rock band. Jane Comerford, lecturer and frontwoman of the band Texas Lightning, served as his vocal coach. In addition, Ullmann learned to play the guitar for the role.

The German-language songs performed in the film by Ullmann and his fictional band Berlin Mitte were composed in part by music producers Roland Spremberg and Michael Beckmann. Both the sound and image of the quartet were heavily influenced by the Magdeburg pop-rock band Tokio Hotel, which was enjoying major commercial success in Germany at the time.

The soundtrack to the film was released on September 17, 2010, by Alias Entertainment under license from the Warner Music Group. It reached number 47 on the German album charts.

== Reception ==
Various critics recognized parallels to the American-British romantic comedy Notting Hill from 1999 or even described Single By Contract as its German counterpart.

Lead actress Anna Fischer received unanimously positive reviews for her performance in the film.

In his review for Filmstarts, critic Christoph Petersen described the movie as “really good cinema that easily outshines most modern Hollywood comedies” and stated that “there is hardly anything comparable in Germany at this level of quality.” According to Petersen, the production was “a thoroughly charming comedy right up to the very last scene,” winning audiences over with “many small creative ideas, its cheeky (but never rude) style, and plenty of Berlin local color.” He also praised the performances of Anna Fischer, Kostja Ullmann, and Nina Gummich, noting that the chemistry between the two leads worked “from their very first encounter in the flower bed.”

Margret Köhler of Kino.de felt that director Marc Rothemund had created “an enchanting fairy tale with all the ingredients of a feel-good movie” that appealed to audiences across generations. Despite heartbreak and romantic drama, “humor, wit, and situational comedy pop like champagne corks,” while “the chemistry between teen idol Ullmann and the lively Fischer works down to the very last fiber.” Köhler also described the tender story as “a glowing ode to Berlin and its swing.” She further praised the soundtrack by music producer Roland Spremberg, who had previously celebrated two number-one albums with a-ha, saying that the songs provided “the ultimate musical kick for this hip mixture.”

Stern editor Sophie Albers called Single by Contract “a German romantic comedy that actually does everything right.” She wrote that the film achieved “the art of lightness without losing sight of reality” and was aimed at “all Twilight, Tokio Hotel, and Bravo fans.” According to Albers, the film worked “so well” largely because of “the wonderful cast, right down to the smallest role, and of course because of the lead actors. The chemistry between Ullmann and Fischer is simply right.” She also noted that Fischer seemed to blossom in the role, while Rothemund delivered a successful love letter to the city of Berlin.
