= Ants in the Pants (film) =

2000 film

- Theatrical release poster
- Directed by: Marc Rothemund
- Produced by: Bernd Eichinger
- Starring: Tobias Schenke; Axel Stein
- Music by: Johnny Klimek
- Production company: Constantin Film
- Distributed by: Constantin Film
- Release date: 30 March 2000
- Running time: 95 minutes
- Country: Germany
- Language: German

Ants in the Pants (German: Harte Jungs, "Hard Boys") is a 2000 German comedy film directed by Marc Rothemund. It is based on the novel "Io e lui" by Alberto Moravia.

== Cast ==
- Tobias Schenke - Flo
- Axel Stein - Red Bull
- Luise Helm - Lisa
- Mina Tander - Leonie
- Björn Kirschniok - Kai
- Nicky Kantor - Schumi
- Tom Lass - Dirk
- Sascha Heymans - Casper
- Sissi Perlinger - Mutter
- Stefan Jürgens - Vater
- Christian Schneller - Winterfeld
- Andrea Sawatzki - Tante Zelda

== Sequels ==
More Ants in the Pants was released in 2002.

Hard Feelings was released in 2023.
