= Da muss Mann durch =

- Theatrical release Poster
- Directed by: Marc Rothemund
- Written by: Hans G. Raeth; Marc Rothemund
- Produced by: Alexander Thies
- Starring: Wotan Wilke Möhring; Julia Jentsch; Jan Josef Liefers
- Cinematography: Martin Langer
- Edited by: Simon Gstöttmayr
- Music by: Peter Hinderthür; Mousse T.
- Production companies: NFP*; Warner Bros. Film Productions Germany
- Distributed by: Warner Bros. Pictures
- Release date: 29 January 2015
- Country: Germany
- Language: German

Da muss Mann durch is a 2015 German comedy film directed by Marc Rothemund. It is a sequel to Men Do What They Can.

It was released on 29 January 2015 by Warner Bros. Pictures.

== Cast ==
- Wotan Wilke Möhring as Paul
- Julia Jentsch as Lena
- Jan Josef Liefers as Guido
- Fahri Yardim as Bronko
- Oliver Korittke as Günther
- Daniela Ziegler as Elisabeth
- Sophia Thomalla as Audrey
- Stephan Luca as Patrick
- Peter Prager as Karl
- Edita Malovcic as Melissa
- Karoline Schuch as Iggy
- Anton Figl as Dr. Scharf
- Victoria Sordo as Francesca
- Enrique García Coll as Spanischer Verkehrspolizist
- Sarah Rebellato as Ragnhild
- Michaela Wiebusch as Airline Mitarbeiterin
- Pedro Victory as Flughafen Security 1
- Jaime Fuster as Flughafen Security 2
