= Lilly the Witch: The Journey to Mandolan =

2011 German film

- Theatrical release poster
- Directed by: Harald Sicheritz
- Written by: Bettine von Borries; Achim von Borries
- Starring: Alina Freund; Pilar Bardem; Pegah Ferydoni; Anja Kling; Tanay Chheda; Michael Mendl; Lars Rudolph; Ercan Durmaz; Isak Férriz; Jürgen Tarrach; Alexander Yassin; Michael Mittermeier; Cosma Shiva Hagen
- Cinematography: Thomas Kienast
- Music by: Ian Honeyman
- Production companies: blue eyes Fiction; Trixter; Dor Film; Steinweg Emotion Pictures; Babelsberg Film; Buena Vista International Film Production (Germany); Classic
- Distributed by: Walt Disney Studios Motion Pictures, Germany (Note: Distributed under the Buena Vista International banner.)
- Release date: 17 February 2011
- Running time: 90 minutes
- Country: Germany
- Language: German
- Box office: $8.9 million

Lilly the Witch: The Journey to Mandolan (German: Hexe Lilli: Die Reise nach Mandolan) is a 2011 German children's film directed by Harald Sicheritz. It is the second Lilly the Witch film, being preceded by Lilly the Witch: The Dragon and the Magic Book.

== Plot ==
In her second cinematic adventure, Lilly the Witch must travel to the oriental kingdom of Mandolan. On behalf of the Grand Vizier Guliman, she is supposed to banish a curse that weighs on the king's throne and that Guliman wants to climb. Lilly soon sees through the grand vizier's wrong game, which the throne rightly throws off again and again. She finds out that Gulimann is not the real heir to the throne. The rightful king Nandi was overthrown by a scheme by Gulimann and is being held captive by the sorcerer Abrash. With the support of the magic dragon Hector and the Bedouin boy Musa, Lilly travels to the Forbidden City to free the king before Guliman can finally take over the rulership of the land.

== Cast ==
- Alina Freund as Lilly
- Pilar Bardem as Surulunda
- Pegah Ferydoni as Leila
- Anja Kling as Mother
- Tanay Chheda as Musa
- Michael Mendl as Nandi
- Lars Rudolph as Kellner
- Ercan Durmaz as Abrash
- Isak Férriz as Leutnant
- Jürgen Tarrach as Guliman
- Alexander Yassin as Minister
- Michael Mittermeier as Hektor (voice)
- Cosma Shiva Hagen as Suki (voice)

== See also ==
- List of films about witchcraft
