= Diana Amft =

German actress (born 1975)

- Born: 7 November 1975 (age 50); Gütersloh, West Germany
- Occupation: Actress
- Years active: 1999–present
- Spouse: Arne Regul (m. 2011)
- Partner: Granz Henman (2001–2010)
- Website: www.diana-amft.de

Diana Amft (born 7 November 1975) is a German film and television actress and children's writer. She is best known for playing Gretchen Haase in the RTL sitcom Doctor's Diary.

== Biography ==
Diana Amft was born in Gütersloh. Her father was a janitor. She grew up in Herzebrock-Clarholz and one of her after-school jobs was in a video library. She completed her vocational training as a legal administrator at the Rheda-Wiedenbrück district court. She took singing lessons in Bielefeld and unsuccessfully applied to study at the Folkwang Hochschule in Essen.

She was accepted at the Schauspielschule Zerboni in Munich when she was twenty years old, and, following appearances in theatre, she was cast for her first roles on television in 1999.

Amft became better known following her role as Inken in the film Mädchen, Mädchen, which was unexpectedly successful, and its sequel Mädchen, Mädchen 2 – Loft oder Liebe. In 2002, the film More Ants in the Pants, in which she was the leading actress, won the Deutscher Comedypreis as best cinema film. She regards her leading role in the series Doctor's Diary as a breakthrough.

On the soundtrack of Mädchen Mädchen 2 - Loft oder Liebe, she sang Funky Freakshow with Tears, the girl group launched by Popstars in Switzerland. In 2017, she promoted the Yogurette candy bar.

Between 2010 and 2018 she authored a total of eight children's books. The series is entitled Die kleine Spinne Widerlich.

== Films ==
- 2000: Auszeit, as Blanka
- 2001: Mädchen, Mädchen, as Inken
- 2002: Stuart Little 2 - Margalo's voice in the German version
- 2002: Ganz und gar, as Alex
- 2002: More Ants in the Pants, as Maja Paradis
- 2004: Mädchen, Mädchen 2 – Loft oder Liebe, as Inken
- 2005: Princes(s) (short film), as Stella
- 2005: Die drei Musketiere (TV film, ZDF, ORF), as Constance Bonacieux
- 2007: Ideal Son-In-Law (TV film, Sat.1), as Greta Litschka
- 2009: Monsters vs. Aliens - Susan Gigantika’s voice in the German version
- 2009: Kein Geist für alle Fälle (TV film, Sat.1), as Jana
- 2009: Der Bulle und das Landei (TV film, ARD), as Kati Biever
- 2010: Liebe und andere Delikatessen (TV film, ARD), as Franka Lauth
- 2010: Devil's Kickers, as Moritz's mother
- 2011: Plötzlich fett!, as Eva
- 2012: Freshly Squeezed, as Andrea Schnidt
- 2013: The White Horse Inn, as Ottilie Giesecke
- 2014: We Did It for the Money (TV film, Ziegler), as Ines Herzog
- 2014: Vampire Sisters 2: Bats in the Belly
- 2016: Vampire Sisters 3: Journey to Transylvania

== TV ==
- 1999: Eine Liebe auf Mallorca
- 1999: Eine Liebe auf Mallorca 2
- 1999: Unschuldige Biester
- 1999: Zwei Männer am Herd (TV series)
- 2000–2007: SOKO 5113 on ZDF - multiple episodes
- 2000: Eine Liebe auf Mallorca 3
- 2002: Das Traumschiff – Chile
- 2004: Vernunft & Gefühl
- 2005: Zivile Jungs – Helden in Unterhosen (first broadcast in 2008 as Zwei Zivis zum Knutschen)
- 2006–2008: Maja Comedy on Sat.1 Comedy - Maja
- 2007 Ideal Son-In-Law - Greta Litschka
- 2007: Die ProSieben Märchenstunde – Die Prinzessin auf der Erbse (ProSieben - Vroni
- 2007: Innere Werte
- 2007–2011: Doctor’s Diary - series on RTL/ORF - Dr. Gretchen Haase
- 2008: Utta Danella – Das Geheimnis unserer Liebe
- 2008: Im 7. Himmel – Nachricht von Tom
- 2010: Invisible Touch (Sat.1)
- 2010: Der Bulle und das Landei (Eifel-Krimi des SWR)
- 2010: Liebe und andere Delikatessen (ARD)
- 2011: Der Bulle und das Landei: Babyblues
- 2013: Christine. Perfekt war gestern! as Christine (main role)
- 2014–: Josephine Klick - Allein unter Cops (main role)

== Awards ==
- 2009 Bayerischer Fernsehpreis as best actress in the category series for her role in the series Doctor’s Diary
