= Reuven Adiv =

Israeli actor, director and drama teacher

- ראובן אדיב
- Born: Reuven Adiv; 5 June 1930; Jerusalem, British Mandate of Palestine (now Israel)
- Died: 23 December 2004 (aged 74); London, England, UK
- Occupations: Drama teacher, director, actor
- Known for: Head of acting at the Drama Centre in London (1984–2004)

Reuven Adiv (Hebrew: ראובן אדיב; 5 June 1930 – 23 December 2004) was a Jerusalem-born Israeli actor, director and drama teacher, most notable as the head of acting at the Drama Centre in London from 1984 to 2004.

== Early life ==
Reuven Adiv was born in Jerusalem, British Mandate of Palestine (now Israel) on 5 June 1930, to a family of Ashkenazi Jewish background. He fought on the Jerusalem front against the British administration. His father was born in part of modern-day Belarus (then part of the Russian Empire), and died in a Nazi concentration camp.

== Career ==
His early acting experience came at the Ohel Theatre and the Cameri Theater of Tel Aviv. He studied under Lee Strasberg at the Actors Studio in New York, where he also took the director's course. He also studied at the film school of New York University before returning to teach at the Lee Strasberg institute.

He returned to Tel Aviv, Israel, in 1971 and alongside stage and screen acting he was invited to teach at the Beit Zvi school of performing arts in Ramat Gan, Israel. In 1979 he was appointed principal of the theatre department of Seminar HaKibbutzim College.

In 1984, he was invited to become head of the acting department at the Drama Centre, London as a successor to Doreen Cannon, who had become head of acting at the Royal Academy of Dramatic Art (RADA).

"...the results emanate from within, owing nothing to make-up or setting..." – Reuven Adiv

From 1986 to 1996, he was a guest teacher at the Swedish State Theatre School, Gothenburg and from 2003 he taught at the Forum für Filmschauspiel in Berlin.

=== Notable students ===
Tom Hardy

- Morven Christie
- Benjamin Davies
- Colin Firth
- Tara Fitzgerald
- Ruta Gedmintas
- Martin Goeres
- Helen McCrory
- John Simm

=== Selected stage productions as director ===
- The Crucible, Drama Centre London (2003)
- Marya, Drama Centre London (2003)
- Paradise Lost, Drama Centre London (2002)
- This Happy Breed by Noël Coward, Drama Centre London (2002)
- Napoli Millionaria by Eduardo De Filippo, Drama Centre London (2001)
- Tartuffe, Drama Centre London (2000)
- The Seagull, Drama Centre London (1999)
- Six Characters in Search of an Author by Luigi Pirandello, Drama Centre London (n.d.)
- Ibsen's A Doll's House, Drama Centre London (n.d.)
- Spring Awakening, Drama Centre London (n.d.)
- Enemies, Drama Centre London (n.d.)
- Right You Are (If You Think You Are), Drama Centre London (n.d.)

== Personal life ==
He married the Israeli actress and broadcaster Galia Nativ in 1980. They had two children, a daughter and a son, and lived in North London. He died of a heart attack in 2004, aged 74.

== Filmography ==
- 1976 Giv'at Halfon Eina Ona (English: Halfon Hill Doesn't Answer), directed by Assi Dayan, Israel – Cast member

== See also ==
- Method acting
- Drama Centre London
- Actors Studio
- Beit Zvi
