= Anna Fischer =

German actress (born 1986)

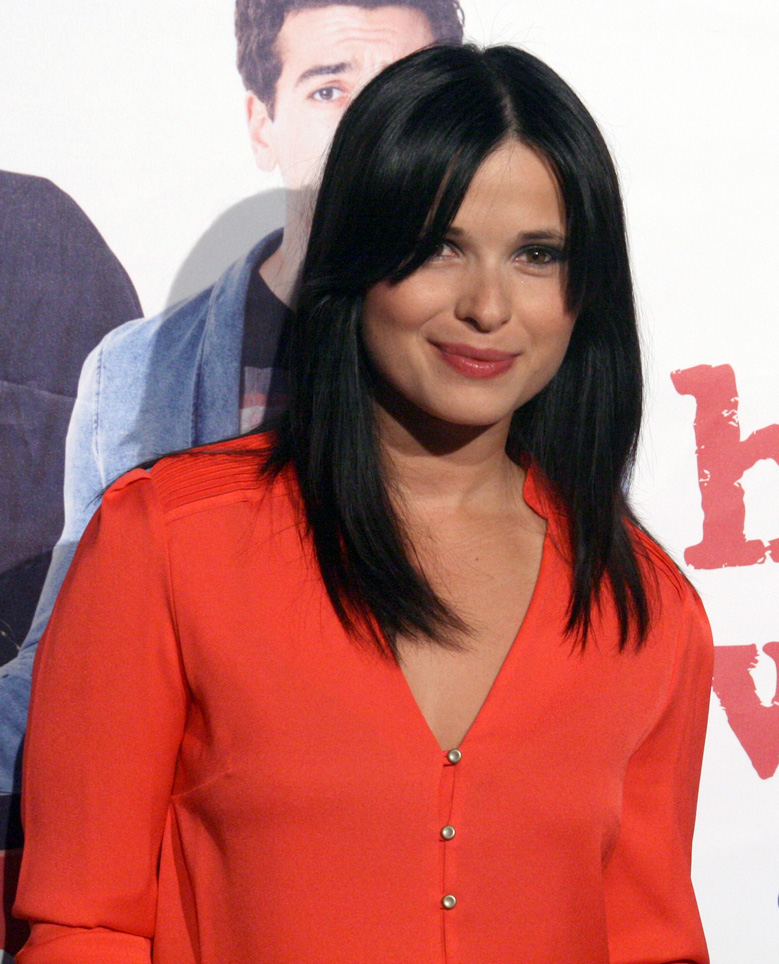
- Fischer in 2012
- Born: Marion Anna Fischer; 18 July 1986 (age 39); East Berlin, East Germany
- Occupations: Actress, singer
- Years active: 2003–present

Marion Anna Fischer (born 18 July 1986) is a German actress and singer. Since 2003, she appeared in over 30 film and television roles. She is most recognised to international audiences as the perky vampire Nora in Dennis Gansel's drama film We Are The Night.

== Biography ==
Anna Fischer grew up under modest circumstances in the Berlin district of Hohenschoenhausen. The daughter of a kindergarten teacher and a corporate staff she began to devote herself to music at the age of eleven. In 2002 director Hans-Christian Schmid saw her in a club and cast her in a small role in the film Distant Lights. The breakthrough as an actress came in 2005 when Fischer scored the lead role in Jeanette Wagner's Liebeskind. In the drama she played a venue for the 17-year-old Alma, which again looks after years of separation, her biological father (played by Lutz Berger Bloch).

She earned critical acclaim in 2008 when she starred in Hermine Huntgeburth's Teufelsbraten. In the two part TV film based on Ulla Hahn's novel The Hidden Word, she slipped into the role of a timid and defiant teenager whose thirst for knowledge in the Rhenish-Catholic working-class family in the 1960s met with resistance. For the part of Hildegard, she shared with two younger actresses, she was awarded the 2009 Adolf Grimme Prize. In 2009 she starred in the three-part The Rebel as the sister of Alexandra Neldel.

In addition to her acting career, Fischer is the lead singer and songwriter, of the five-member band Panda, founded in 2004. Their music is inspired, according to the members of the group, by the beat music of the 1970s. In early May 2007 was released the first single "Jeht kacken", followed by their first album: Tretmine. In September 2014, the band, now only a trio, announced on their Facebook page the release of their new EP Im Rudel, and hinted at a future second album release.

She also voiced Vanellope von Schweetz in the German dub of Wreck-It Ralph.

== Filmography ==
- 2003 – Distant Lights
- 2005 – Kometen
- 2005 – Liebeskind
- 2006 – The Cloud
- 2008 – Teufelsbraten (TV film)
- 2009 – The Rebel (TV miniseries)
- 2009 – Live Wire
- 2009 – Beloved Berlin Wall
- 2010 – Masserberg (TV film)
- 2010 – We Are the Night
- 2010 – Single by Contract
- 2012 – Heiter bis Wolkig
- 2012 – The Dead and the Living
- 2014 – Better Than Nothing
