= Pornorama =

- Theatrical release poster
- Directed by: Marc Rothemund
- Written by: Stephan Puchner
- Produced by: Bernd Eichinger
- Starring: Tom Schilling; Benno Fürmann
- Cinematography: Martin Langer
- Edited by: Hans Funck
- Music by: Mousse T.
- Production companies: Constantin Film; Sommer 69 Film GmbH & Co. KG; Erfttal Film Gruppe
- Distributed by: Constantin Film
- Release date: 11 October 2007
- Running time: 94 minutes
- Country: Germany
- Language: German

Pornorama is a 2007 German comedy film directed by Marc Rothemund. The film describes the porn industry in Munich between the 60s and the 80s.

== Plot ==
It's the end of the 60s and Bennie Köpke (Tom Schilling) is training to be a police photographer despite wanting to be a film director. He lives with his mother in the prestigious Munich district of Ramersdorf and his swearing in ceremony is coming up in two weeks. At a demonstration, Bennie films rebellious teenagers in plain clothes and falls in love with Luzie (Karoline Herfurth) who lives in an activist commune. Problems arrive when Bennie's younger brother, Freddie (Benno Fürmann) shows up in desperate need of money and a simple solution: they film a pornographic film which Bennie directs.

== Cast ==
- Tom Schilling as Bennie Köpke
- Benno Fürmann as Freddie Köpke
- Karoline Herfurth as Luzie
- Valentina Lodovini as Gina Ferrari
- Michael Gwisdek as Filmvorführer
- Elke Winkens as Frau Schröder
- Leonie Brill as Emmelie
- Dieter Landuris as Césare
- Lisa Maria Potthoff as Irene
- Michael Schönborn as Hauptkommissar Wiesner
- Martin Glade as Lothar
