= Tattoo (2002 film) =

2002 German film by Robert Schwentke

- DVD cover
- Directed by: Robert Schwentke
- Written by: Robert Schwentke
- Starring: Christian Redl; August Diehl; Nadeshda Brennicke
- Cinematography: Jan Fehse
- Edited by: Peter Przygodda
- Music by: Martin Todsharow
- Production company: StudioCanal
- Distributed by: American Vitagraph
- Release date: 4 April 2002
- Running time: 108 minutes
- Country: Germany
- Languages: German; English; Japanese

Tattoo is a 2002 German thriller film written and directed by Robert Schwentke.

== Plot ==
Marc Schrader, a rookie cop caught red-handed with drugs in a police raid of an illegal rave, joins a homicide investigation conducted by Chief Inspector Minks. The victim is a naked young woman with the skin stripped off her back, killed as she staggered into traffic.

As Schrader and Minks investigate the murder, the case is complicated by a finger found in the stomach of the victim. Forensic examination proves the finger belongs to Nobert Günzel, who was previously convicted of rape and assault. The police raid Günzel’s residence, and discover a blood-stained table with restraints and bits of human flesh in his basement. They also find video equipment and preserved, tattooed skin from the victim’s back. Soon, they find dead bodies buried in the garden. Günzel then goes missing.

As the complex investigation progresses, Schrader discovers Mink has a personal stake in the investigation; he wants to find the missing daughter of an old friend. He realizes later that the missing girl is actually Mink’s runaway daughter. As the body count rises, the duo has to come to terms with their inner demons, and the truth is much darker than it seems.

The plot resembles the Roald Dahl short story "Skin."

== Cast ==
- Christian Redl - Chief Inspector Minks
- August Diehl - Marc Schrader
- Nadeshda Brennicke - Maya Kroner
- Johan Leysen - Frank Schoubya
- Fatih Cevikkollu - Dix
- Monica Bleibtreu - Kommissarin Roth
- Ilknur Bahadir - Meltem
- Joe Bausch - Günzel
- Florian Panzner - Poscher
- Jasmin Schwiers - Marie Minks
