= Marc Rothemund =

German film director (born 1968)

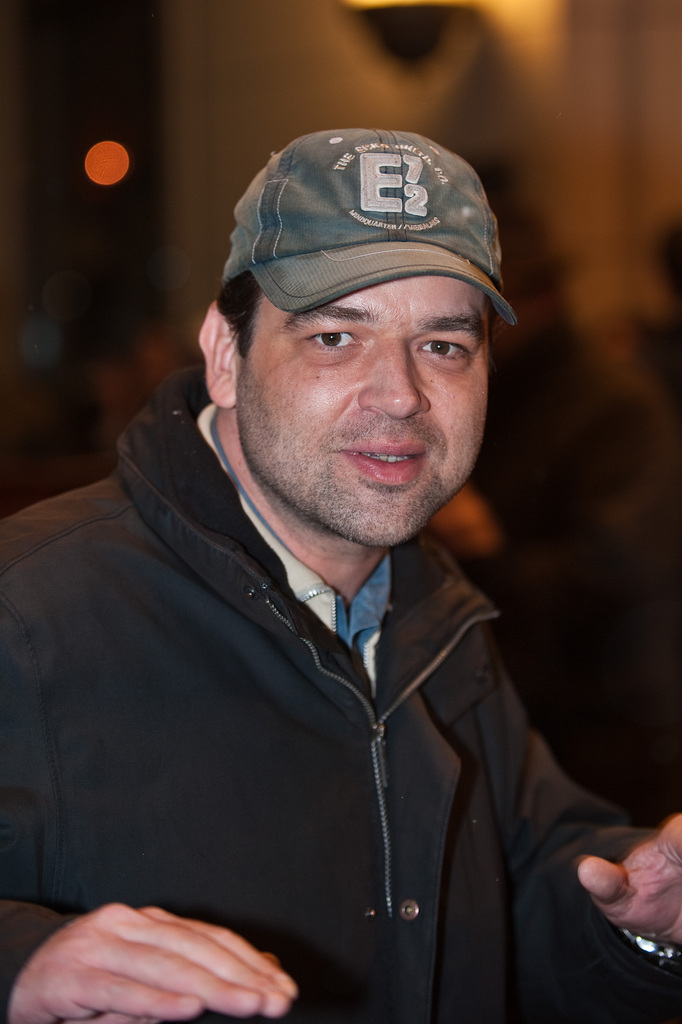
Rothemund in 2010

Marc Rothemund (born 26 August 1968) is a German film director. He is the son of the film director Sigi Rothemund and the brother of the actress Nina Rothemund. He began his career as an assistant for his father and then began to direct episodes for TV series. His first feature film was the 1998 production Das merkwürdige Verhalten geschlechtsreifer Großstädter zur Paarungszeit. In 2005 he directed the film Sophie Scholl – The Final Days, written by Fred Breinersdorfer, which was nominated for the 78th Academy Awards Best Foreign Language Film and received numerous other awards, including the Silver Bear for Best Director at the Berlin International Film Festival.

== Filmography ==
- Das merkwürdige Verhalten geschlechtsreifer Großstädter zur Paarungszeit (1998)
- Ants in the Pants (2000)
- Final Hope (2002)
- Sophie Scholl – The Final Days (2005)
- Pornorama (2007)
- Single by Contract (2010)
- The Girl with Nine Wigs (2013)
- Da muss Mann durch (2015)
- My Blind Date With Life (2017)
- This Crazy Heart (2017)
- Weekend Rebels (2023)

== Awards ==
- 1998 Bavarian Film Awards, Best New Director
- 2005 Bavarian Film Awards, Best Director
