= We Are the Night (film) =

2010 film by Dennis Gansel

- Theatrical release poster
- German: Wir sind die Nacht
- Directed by: Dennis Gansel
- Screenplay by: Jan Berger
- Story by: Dennis Gansel
- Produced by: Christian Becker
- Starring: Karoline Herfurth; Nina Hoss; Jennifer Ulrich; Anna Fischer; Max Riemelt; Arved Birnbaum; Steffi Kühnert
- Cinematography: Torsten Breuer
- Edited by: Ueli Christen
- Music by: Heiko Maile
- Production companies: Rat Pack Filmproduktion; Celluloid Dreams
- Distributed by: Constantin Film
- Release dates: 14 October 2010 (Sitges Film Festival); 28 October 2010 (Germany)
- Running time: 100 minutes
- Country: Germany
- Language: German
- Budget: €6.5 million
- Box office: $2.3 million

We Are the Night (German: Wir sind die Nacht) is a 2010 German vampire horror film directed by Dennis Gansel, starring Karoline Herfurth and Nina Hoss. The film deals with a young woman who gets bitten by a female vampire and drawn into her world. She falls in love with a young police officer who investigates a murder case involving the vampires. The film explores themes of depression, self-harm, the consequences of immortality, suicide, and explores Valerie Solanas' idea of an all-female society.

== Plot ==
Lena, a young criminal, lurks near a cash dispenser. Just as her victim has used the machine, she pickpockets his credit card, but moments later her mark is arrested by the police. She flees, but a police officer, Tom, chases after her and eventually catches up with her on a bridge. After a short conversation, he tries to arrest her, but Lena fights him off and jumps off the bridge onto a passing boat.

Later that evening, Lena goes to a nightclub, which is run by Louise. Inside the club, Louise dances with Lena and offers her a drink. When Lena goes to the bathroom, Louise follows and bites her. The terrified Lena runs home. When she awakes in the morning, the sun burns her and she craves blood. Lena returns to the club to confront Louise about what has happened. She meets Louise's two companions, the stoic Charlotte and the cheerful Nora. On Charlotte's suggestion, the women sell Lena to some Russian pimps to force her to accept her new state of being (the word "vampire" is never mentioned in the film). Lena attacks one of the mobsters as he tries to rape her, but she is shot by another pimp wielding a shotgun. The women enter the compound and kills the pimps but fail to notice one mobster hiding in fear. Before leaving, Nora steals one of the mobster's Lamborghini.

When Lena awakes at the hotel, Louise gives her a glass of what appears to be blood. As Lena drinks, she feels her strength return. Louise bathes Lena and tells her the story of how she was changed. At first she hated her maker, but grew to love her after traveling throughout Europe and getting to know all the benefits of the immortal life. After her maker was killed by sunlight, Louise wanted to commit suicide to join her, but instead began searching for a new companion. As Lena bathes, her short hair grows and returns to its natural color, her piercing falls out and she loses all bruises and wounds (including a tattoo on her belly).

Lena spends a night shopping, partying and having fun with the women who give her the stolen Lamborghini. As the night comes to an end, the women return to their hotel to perform their morning ritual: allowing the first rays of sun burn their skin but retreating inside before any lasting harm can be done. Louise kisses Lena, which startles and confuses Lena who bites Louise's lip, before she interrupts herself and begins cursing her hastiness.

The next night when Lena returns home to pick up some belongings, she is met by Tom, who used a file on Lena to find her home address. The two have coffee and talk, but when Lena suddenly sees Louise approaching, she uses her Lamborghini to retreat to the nightclub. She finds Charlotte in a private room where Charlotte tells Lena that she was a silent film actress in the 1920s and that she had a husband and daughter. Louise enters the room and asks Lena why she is acting different. Lena lies that she misses the sun, so Louise takes the girls to Tropical Islands Resort that has artificial sunlight allowing them to have a pool party "in the sun". Two night watchmen find the girls and Nora convinces the men to join them in the pool. Lena is concerned they are going to harm them, but Louise gives Lena her word they will not hurt the men. However, Nora quickly kills off one of them, but the other tries to escape. Charlotte sadistically kills this man and Lena flees the scene in terror.

Tom and his partner, Lummer, interrogate the surviving mobster who says that the devil killed his friends and stole his Lamborghini. Tom realizes that the stolen car is the car he saw Lena drive. The SEK storms the hotel and in the chaos, Nora dies when she is exposed to the sun.

The three remaining women escapes and hide at the abandoned Teufelsberg and prepare to flee to Russia. Before leaving, Charlotte demands to see her elderly daughter, whom Charlotte sings a lullaby to as she dies. With a whole day before their departure to Russia the girls return to their hideout to perform their morning ritual. As the sun rises, Charlotte locks Lena and Louise inside and allows the sun to kill her.

Lena goes to Tom to say goodbye and forces him to shoot her and the wound heals in front of his eyes to show her true nature. Lena begins to cry while Tom holds her and they fall asleep. Lummer, who has suspected Tom of having some involvement with the women since the hotel attack, has the SEK incarcerate them. Louise goes to the watchmen while they're in the shower and kills them. Louise asks Lena through an intercom how she would manage to live with a man destined to die, herself knowing the pain of losing a loved one. Louise kidnaps Tom and Lena follows her. At Teufelsberg, Louise wants Lena to tell her, "I love you". Lena does so and Louise says that that is the most beautiful lie she has ever heard and shoots Tom. Louise and Lena have a fight and Lena throws Louise into the sunlight, where she dies with a peaceful smile. Lena runs to Tom and wants to bite him, but stops, kisses him and begins to cry.

The SEK arrives with Lummer. Lena and Tom are gone with no trace other than Louise's gun. Lummer looks outside and whispers "Good luck" and walks away from the scene.

== Cast ==
- Karoline Herfurth as Lena
- Nina Hoss as Louise
- Jennifer Ulrich as Charlotte
- Anna Fischer as Nora
- Max Riemelt as Tom
- Arved Birnbaum as Lummer
- Steffi Kühnert as Lena's mother
- Jochen Nickel as Parole Officer
- Ivan Shvedoff as van Gogh
- Nic Romm as Olsen
- Christian Näthe as Guard 1
- Tom Jahn as Guard 2
- Manuel Depta as Russian Pimp 1
- Waléra Kanischtscheff as Wasja

== Production ==
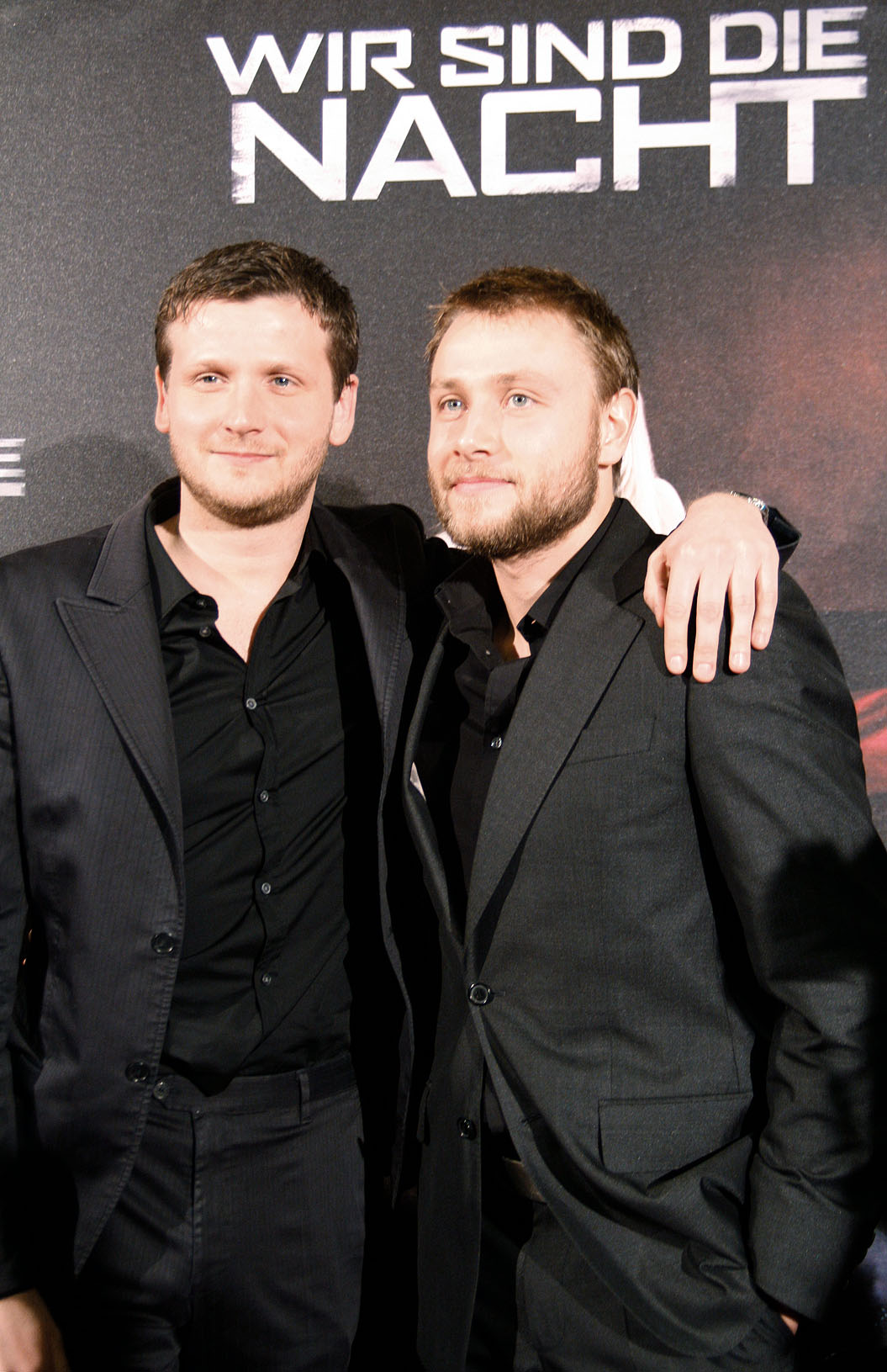
Director Dennis Gansel with star Max Riemelt

=== Development ===
Director Dennis Gansel conceived the film in 1996 while studying filmmaking. After spending a night at the Tresor nightclub in Berlin, he became interested in combining the city's nightlife and abandoned industrial spaces with a vampire story. The project was initially developed under the title The Dawn. Gansel developed the project for more than a decade before it entered production. The final screenplay was written by Jan Berger. Gansel drew on the tradition of female-vampire fiction, including Carmilla, while setting the story within contemporary Berlin nightlife.

=== Filming ===
Principal photography took place in Berlin from 11 October to 16 December 2009. The film was shot on 35 mm. Locations included the former Stadtbad Lichtenberg, which was used for the nightclub interior; the Spreepark and Plänterwald for exterior club scenes; Haus Cumberland on the Kurfürstendamm for the hotel; and the former radar station at Teufelsberg for the climax.

== Soundtrack ==
The film's score was composed by Heiko Maille and performed by the Deutsches Filmorchester Babelsberg. The soundtrack album, released as an MP3 download and on CD, features the majority of the songs and parts of the score. One song, "Pleased to meet you" by Wolfmother, was featured in the film, but is not on the soundtrack. Heiko Maile was inspired by the score of the film The Dark Knight and how it combined electronic music with orchestra music and electric guitar. Maile used "Au Clair De La Lune" as Charlotte's theme. Sven Hack performed the sad clarinet solos that appear throughout the film.

1. "Self-fulfilling Prophecy" – Scala & Kolacny Brothers
2. "In Our Eyes" (Anthony Mills Soundtrack Version) − Moonbootica
3. "Wir sind die Nacht" − Covenant
4. "Charlotte's Death (Au Clair De La Lune)" (Score) − Heiko Maile
5. "Nightlife" − IAMX
6. "Lena's Metamorphosis" (Score) − Heiko Maile
7. "Cold Song" − Klaus Nomi
8. "Escape From The Hotel (Suite)" (Score) − Heiko Maile
9. "Dumpfe Träume (WSDN Remix)" − Xenia Beliayeva
10. "Miserable Girl (Nite Version)" − Soulwax
11. "Tief in der Nacht" − DJ Valero
12. "IERS" − Dirk Blümlein Terzett
13. "Land Of The Free" − Warren Suicide
14. "Farewell My Child" (score) − Heiko Maile
15. "Pretty When You Cry" − VAST
16. "Russian Whorehouse (Suite)" (score) − Heiko Maile
17. "Big And Bad (WSDN Edit)" − Gabriel Le Mar

The complete score was released as an MP3 download on Amazon.de and the German iTunes Store.

== Alternative endings ==
Two other endings were shot for this film, like with Gansel's previous film The Wave. Both were discarded to bring a more ambiguous ending to the film.

The first alternative ending plays out almost like the final ending. It continues after Lena starts to cry and shows her running away into the subway station leaving Tom behind. She stops and looks behind her before starting to run again.

In the second ending however, Lena finds Tom dying from his wound and bites him, turning him into a vampire. After delivering the bite, Lena flies backwards, crashing into the wall much like Louise did when she bit her. Lena whispers "Forgive me," as Tom rises on his feet. The camera moves away as they look at each other.

Actress Anna Fischer later confirmed that multiple alternate endings had been shot and said that director Dennis Gansel ultimately chose the ending he considered best for the theatrical release.

== Release ==
We Are the Night screened at the 43rd Sitges Film Festival in October 2010, where it received the Special Jury Award. Constantin Film released the film theatrically in Germany on 28 October 2010.

=== Box office ===
By January 2011, the film had attracted 105,237 admissions in Germany, according to figures from the German Federal Film Board.

=== Home media ===
Paramount Home Entertainment released the film on DVD and Blu-ray in Germany on 14 April 2011. The DVD included a director's video diary, visual-effects featurette, audio commentary, trailers and alternative endings; additional material was included on the Blu-ray edition.

== Novelisation ==
In 2010, German fantasy author Wolfgang Hohlbein wrote a novel based on the film's screenplay, published by Heyne. Hohlbein took creative liberties with the adaptation.

== Critical reception ==
Peter Zander of Die Welt responded positively to the film, praising its treatment of vampire mythology, its female protagonists and its use of Berlin as more than a simple backdrop. He also identified themes of hedonism and the seduction of youth that connected the film with Gansel's earlier work.

International reviews were more mixed. Jeannette Catsoulis of The New York Times criticised the film's emphasis on visual style and considered its central romance ineffective. Mark Holcomb of The Village Voice praised its action sequences and visual effects while finding the characters less emotionally developed.

In 2025, the British Film Institute included We Are the Night in its selection of ten great German horror films. Critic Anton Bitel highlighted the film's updating of the themes of Carmilla within contemporary Germany and its connection to the country's long tradition of vampire cinema.

On Rotten Tomatoes, 60% of 15 critics' reviews are positive.

=== Accolades ===
We Are the Night received the Special Jury Award at the 2010 Sitges Film Festival. At the 2011 German Film Awards, Ueli Christen was nominated for Best Editing and Heiko Maile for Best Film Score.

== See also ==
- Vampire film
