= Tobias Schenke =

German actor (born 1981)

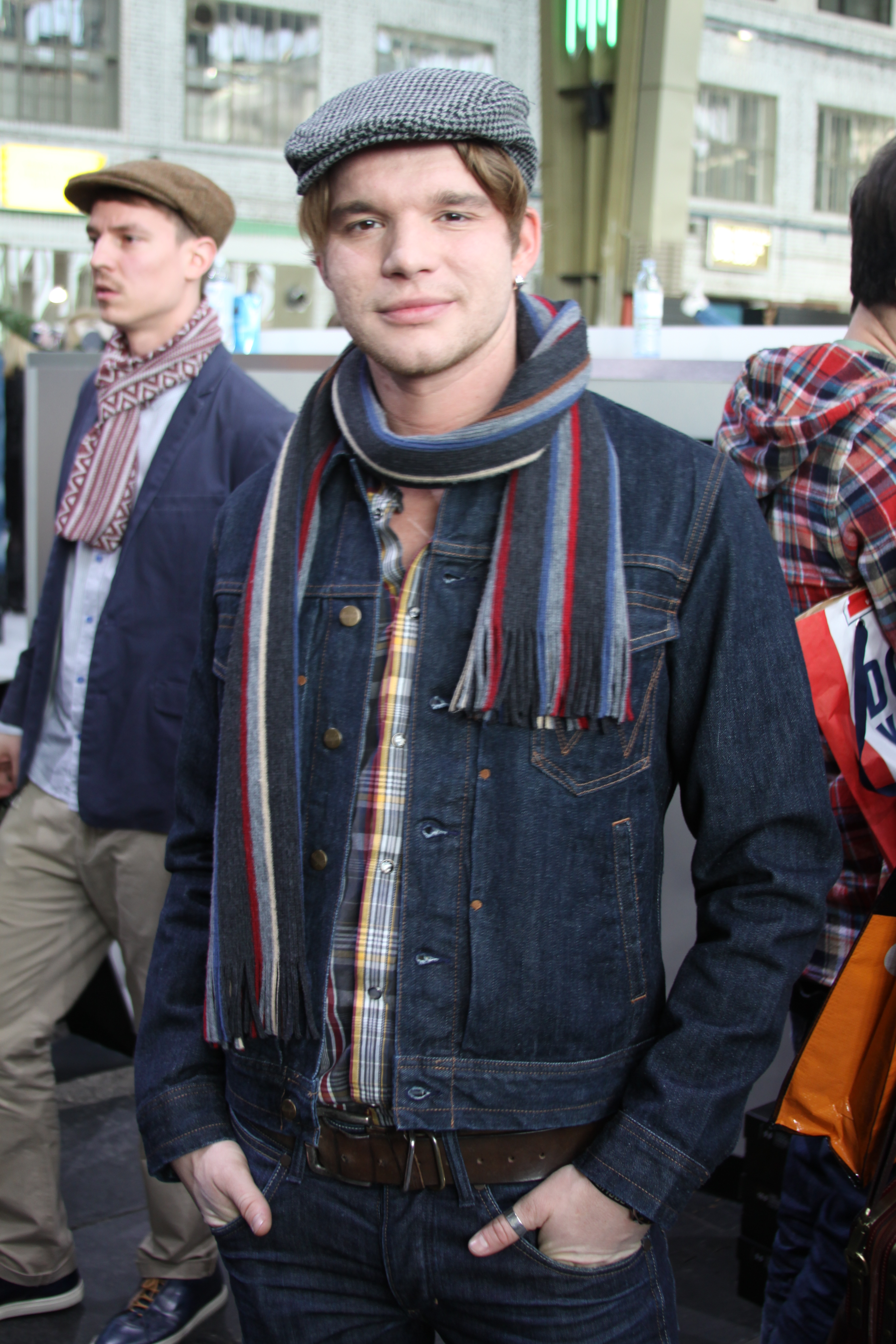
Tobias Schenke at the Bread & Butter fair in Berlin on January 19th, 2011

Tobias Schenke (27 March 1981) is a German actor most famous for playing the character of Florian Thomas in Ants in the Pants and More Ants in the Pants and the older Jürgen Bartsch in The Child I Never Was.

In 2002, he was a lead actor in Alexander Pfeuffer's short film Breakfast?.

In 2003, he produced together with the singer Adel El Tavil (or Kane), the song Niemand hat gesagt. The single even reached the German charts.

He was born in Rüdersdorf, Germany.
