= Lindsay Hollister =

American actress

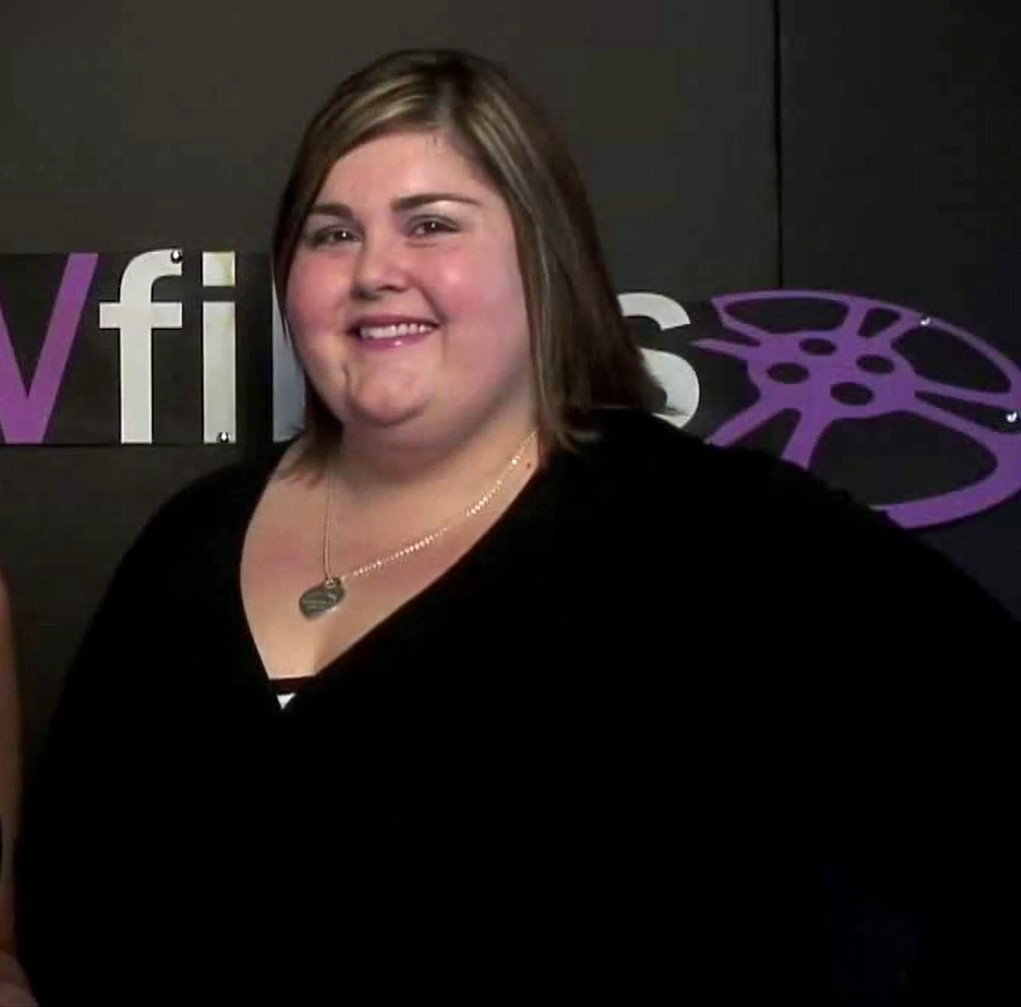
- Hollister in 2009
- Born: June 3, 1977 (age 49)
- Education: Miami University
- Occupation: Actress
- Years active: 2001–present
- Spouse: Matt Heffner (m. 2014)

Lindsay Hollister (born June 3, 1977) is an American actress.

== Biography ==
Hollister is a native of Pickerington, Ohio, who graduated from Miami University with a bachelor of fine arts in theater performance degree in 1999.

Hollister has appeared in many American television shows, including Boston Public, Popular, Days of Our Lives, ER, Cold Case, Nip/Tuck and Law & Order: Special Victims Unit.

She appeared in the films Bachelor Party Vegas in 2006, Postal in 2007, and Get Smart in 2008 as Steve Carell's dance partner.

Hollister starred as the title character in the 2011 Uwe Boll film Blubberella. She stated she took the role because of diminishing opportunities for overweight actresses to find work in Hollywood.

== Filmography ==
=== Film ===
Year	Title	Role	Notes
2016	Pee-wee's Big Holiday	Peggy Brown	
2014	Bad Service	Vanessa	Short film; also writer
2013	Bitch Club	Sandra	Short film; also creator and writer
2013	Sweet Talk	Ginny	
2011	Walk a Mile in My Pradas	Laura	
2011	Blubberella	Blubberella	Also additional writer
2011	Some Guy Who Kills People	Paula Prichard	
2011	Birds of a Feather	Bee Bee	
2008	Disfigured	Alice	
2008	Get Smart	Max's Dance Partner	
2007	Postal	Recorder	
2006	Puff, Puff, Pass	Heather	Directed by Mekhi Phifer
2006	Bachelor Party Vegas	Bachelorette	
2005	McBride: It's Murder, Madam	Becky Sullivan	Television film
2004	A Cinderella Story	Bachelorette #2	
2002	Sex and the Teenage Mind	Margret Lapinski	

=== Television ===
Year	Title	Role	Episode
2018	Food Paradise	Herself (as Lindsay Hollister Heffner)	Season 14, episode 8: "Easy As Pie"
2015	Wayward Pines	Patricia Evans	Season 1, episode 2: "Do Not Discuss Your Life Before"
2012	Necessary Roughness	Denise	Season 2, episode 4: "Slumpbuster"
2011	Svetlana	Holly	Season 2, episode 4: "Episode #2.4"
2009	Bones	Bartender	Season 5, episode 8: "The Foot in the Foreclosure"
2008	CSI: NY	Plus Size Paula	Season 4, episode 19: "Personal Foul"
2007	The Shield	Lisa Franklin	Season 6, episode 3: "Back to One"
2006	Desperate Housewives	Maureen	Season 2, episode 22: "No One is Alone"
2006	Big Love	Sally	Season 1, episode 6: "Roberta's Funeral"
2006	My Name Is Earl	Xena	Season 1, episode 12: "O Karma, Where Art Thou?"
2005	Cold Case	Laurie Dunne	Season 3, episode 2: "The Promise"
2005	Scrubs	Nell Goldman	Season 4, episode 20: "My Boss's Free Haircut"
2004	Joan of Arcadia	Computer Girl God; Library Girl God	Season 1, episode 14: "State of Grace"; Season 1, episode 20: "Anonymous"
2004	Law & Order: Special Victims Unit	Agnes Linsky	Season 5, episode 17: "Mean"
2003	Nip/Tuck	Nanette Babcock	Season 1, episode 3: "Nanette Babcock"
2002	ER	Theresa Matthews	Season 8, episode 15: "It's All in Your Head"
2001	Days of Our Lives	Susan Adamson #1	12 episodes
2001	Going to California	Natalie	Season 1, episode 5: "Rules of the Rod"
2001	Strong Medicine	Margie Sinowski	Season 2, episode 2: "Adverse Reactions"
2001	Any Day Now	Henrietta	Season 4, episode 1: "Don't Forget to Take Out Your Teeth"
2001	Popular	Big Bertha Muffin	Season 2, episode 20: "You Don't Tug on Superman's Cape"
2001	Boston Public	Christine Banks / The Blob	3 episodes
2001	The Drew Carey Show	Office Woman	Season 6, episode 18: "Drew's Life After Death"

=== Web series ===
Year	Title	Role	Episode	Notes
2019	Days of Our Lives: Last Blast Reunion	Susan Adamson	6 episodes	Reprisal of original 2001 role
2013	Breaking Fat	Kibblets	14 episodes	Also creator, producer, writer and director
