= Blubberella =

2011 film

- DVD cover
- Directed by: Uwe Boll
- Written by: Uwe Boll; Willam Belli; Michael Christopher; Lindsay Hollister
- Produced by: Uwe Boll; Sandra Basso; Dan Clarke; Jonathan Shore; Lindsay Hollister; Willam Belli
- Starring: Lindsay Hollister; Michael Paré; Brendan Fletcher; Arved Birnbaum; Willam Belli; Uwe Boll
- Music by: Jessica de Rooij
- Production companies: Boll KG Productions; Event Film Productions
- Distributed by: Phase 4 Films
- Release date: 28 April 2011
- Running time: 87 minutes
- Countries: Germany; United States; Canada
- Language: English
- Budget: $5 million

Blubberella is a 2011 German-American-Canadian exploitation comedy film written and directed by Uwe Boll. The plot is about an obese dhampir superhero, set in German-occupied Europe. The entire film is a scene-for-scene spoof of BloodRayne: The Third Reich (directed by Boll himself the previous year) with most of the same cast and crew. The film received negative reviews.

== Plot ==
In the year 1940, Blubberella is an obese vampire/human hybrid with a hatred of Adolf Hitler, and a soft spot for food. The rest of the film roughly follows the plot of Bloodrayne 3: The Third Reich, although some scenes are inserted for comedic purposes, such as a scene were Blubberella talks to her mum, and numerous jokes about sex, obesity and being gay.

== Cast ==
- Lindsay Hollister as Blubberella
- Uwe Boll as Adolf Hitler
- Michael Paré as Commandant Ekart Brand
- Brendan Fletcher as Nathaniel Gregor
- Arved Birnbaum as Director
- Willam Belli as Vadge
- Clint Howard as Dr. Wolfgang Mangler
- Steffen Mennekes as Lieutenant Caspar Jaegar
- Safiya Kaygin as Slutlana

== Reception ==
The film received negative reviews.

In an interview with Popzara's Brittany Vincent, Hollister said she took the role because of diminishing opportunity for large actresses to find work in Hollywood. "I've been doing this for ten years. While I've been extremely lucky to play some amazing characters, I’ve watched the roles dry up. And I’ve been shut out of even auditioning for many character roles because I'm too large." On taking on the title role of Blubberella, she states "This movie would have been done with or without me. It would have been a lot more offensive if I hadn’t done it. But I didn’t win the war about the title. I hate the title." In an interview with Entertainment Weekly Hollister discussed the film and insisted her decision to take the role wasn't based on money alone: "I'm not ashamed of Blubberella... Of course there's fat jokes in the film. If they had put another salami sandwich in my hand, I was going to start killing the crew. But I want people to know we weren't setting out to hate fat people. It's important for me that people know the true story." She went on to say, "This movie was made with the best intentions. I truly wanted to make a movie about a fat girl who could kick ass."
