= Axel Schreiber =

German actor (1977–2026)

- Born: 30 January 1977; Lübben, East Germany
- Died: 3 June 2026 (aged 49)
- Education: Hochschule für Musik, Theater und Medien Hannover
- Occupation: Actor

Axel Schreiber (30 January 1977 – 3 June 2026) was a German actor.

== Life and career ==
After his studies at the Hochschule für Musik, Theater und Medien Hannover, he began working as an actor in 2001. In 2004, he permanently moved to Berlin.

Schreiber died of cancer on 3 June 2026, at the age of 49.

== Filmography ==
- Doppelter Einsatz (2006)
- Türkisch für Anfänger (2006–2007)
- SOKO Wismar (2006)
- Großstadtrevier (2007)
- Notruf Hafenkante (2007–2019)
- Berlin by the Sea (2008)
- Circle of Life (2008)
- A Case for Two (2009)
- Tatort (2009)
- The Last Cop (2010)
- Leipzig Homicide (2011)
- Der Kriminalist (2012)
- Der Bergdoktor (2013)
- Christine. Perfekt war gestern! (2013)
- Coast Guard (2013)
- SOKO Köln (2015)
- Einstein (2018)
- Beck is Back! (2019)
- In aller Freundschaft (2025)
