= Sweethearts (2019 film) =

2019 film

- Theatrical release poster
- Directed by: Karoline Herfurth
- Written by: Monika Fäßler
- Produced by: Christopher Doll; Lothar Hellinger
- Starring: Karoline Herfurth; Hannah Herzsprung
- Cinematography: Daniel Gottschalk
- Edited by: Simon Gstöttmayr
- Music by: Annette Focks
- Production companies: Hellinger / Doll Filmproduktion; Warner Bros. Film Productions Germany
- Distributed by: Warner Bros. Pictures
- Release date: 14 February 2019
- Running time: 107 minutes
- Country: Germany
- Language: German
- Box office: $585,028

Sweethearts is a 2019 German comedy film directed by Karoline Herfurth who also stars in the film.

== Plot ==
Franziska "Franny" Kinnert (Karoline Herfurth) is taken hostage by diamond thief Melanie Rossbach (Hannah Herzsprung). As time goes by a friendship develops between the women and they become sweethearts.

== Cast ==
- Karoline Herfurth as Franziska "Franny" Kinnert
- Hannah Herzsprung as Melanie Rossbach
- Frederick Lau as Harry
- Anneke Kim Sarnau as Ingrid von Kaiten
- Ronald Zehrfeld as Frank
- Frederic Linkemann as Timmsen
- David Schütter as Charlie
