= Head Burst =

2019 German film

- Directed by: Savaş Ceviz
- Written by: Savaş Ceviz
- Produced by: Christoph Holthof; Daniel Reich
- Starring: Max Riemelt; Isabell Gerschke; Oskar Netzel; Ercan Durmaz
- Cinematography: Anne Bolick
- Edited by: Frank Brummundt; Savaş Ceviche
- Music by: Jens Südkamp; Savaş Ceviz
- Production companies: Kurhaus Production; Südwestrundfunk (SWR)
- Distributed by: Edition Salzgeber; Salzgeber & Company Medien
- Release dates: 19 October 2019 (São Paulo International Film Festival); 2 April 2020 (Internet); 20 August 2020 (Germany)
- Country: Germany
- Language: German

Head Burst (German: Kopfplatzen) is a 2019 drama film directed by Savaş Ceviz. It tells the story of Markus, a pedophile who is distressed about his own attractions.

== Plot ==
Markus is a 29-year-old respected architect. No one suspects that he has pedophilic tendencies, which he despises and tortures himself over. One day, Jessica moves into the apartment next to Markus', with her eight-year-old son Arthur. Markus starts babysitting the boy, but over time he starts having feelings for him and comes into conflict with his repressed desires which he feels he cannot control.

== Cast ==
- Max Riemelt as Markus
- Isabell Gerschke as Jessica
- Oskar Netzel as Arthur
- Ercan Durmaz as Dr.Jawad

== Production ==
It was directed by Savaş Ceviz, who also wrote the script and, together with Jens Südkamp, the film music and acted as film editor together with Frank Brummundt. In preparation for the film, Savaş worked with Berlin Charité's "Prevention Project Dunkelfeld", which aims to provide people dealing with sexual thoughts of children therapeutic help so that they do not harm a child.

Savaş first developed the idea of the film in 2006 but had difficulty trying to find funding for the film. It only started filming after SPD politician Sebastian Edathy was investigated for possessing child abuse material in 2014.

== Release ==
The film was scheduled to release in April 2, 2020 but was postponed indefinitely due to the COVID-19 pandemic. It was instead released online on the streaming platform Salzgeber Club.

== Reception ==
Jens Balenborg from epd Film writes that Head Burst has a lot in common with Shame, Steve McQueen's sober, intense character study of a sex addict. Like the English director, Savaş Ceviz does not rely on dramatic drama, but rather on psychological oppression: "He takes us into the head of the pedophilic Markus and lets us see the world through his eyes." However, the film never stylizes Markus as a monster, but even if you come close to him, he still stays away, says Wartenberg.
