= Christine. Perfekt war gestern! =

- Genre: Sitcom
- Based on: The New Adventures of Old Christine
- Starring: Diana Amft; Janek Rieke; Anna Julia Kapfelsperger; Elisabeth Baulitz; Marco Girnth; Minh-Khai Phan-Thi
- Opening theme: Upside Down by Paloma Faith
- Country of origin: Germany
- Original language: German
- No. of seasons: 1
- No. of episodes: 8

Production
- Producer: Beatrice Kramm
- Production location: Berlin
- Running time: 23 minutes
- Production company: Polyphon Film- und Fernsehgesellschaft

Original release
- Network: RTL Television
- Release: August 22 – October 17, 2013

Christine. Perfekt war gestern! is a German television sitcom first aired on 22 August 2013 on RTL. It is an adaptation of the American series The New Adventures of Old Christine.

== Premise ==
Christine is a thirty-something, single mom. She still has a good relationship to her former husband Stefan. Then she meets his new girlfriend whose name is also Christine. So she becomes the “old Christine” and starts looking for a new boyfriend for herself.

== Cast ==
- Diana Amft as Christine Wagner
- Janek Rieke as Stefan Wagner
- Anna Julia Kapfelsperger as the “new” Christine
- Carl Wegelein as Tom Wagner
- Elisabeth Baulitz as Franziska Lüttich
- Brigitte Zeh as Caro von Wiese
- Axel Schreiber as Mark
- Minh-Khai Phan-Thi as Betty

== Production ==
Christine. Perfekt war gestern! is an adaption of the American sitcom The New Adventures of Old Christine starring Julia Louis-Dreyfus. Some dialogs of the original were just translated and put in the German version. Production took place from 20 November 2012 to 25 January 2013 in Berlin. On 24 October 2013 it was announced that there is not going to be a second season of the show.

== Episodes ==
No.	Title	Original release date	Viewers (millions)
1	"Die neue Christine"	August 22, 2013	2.32
2	"Kleine Abenteuer"	August 29, 2013	1.98
3	"Magic Moments"	September 5, 2013	2.24
4	"Olle Kamellen"	September 12, 2013	1.93
5	"Ich zeig Dir meins"	September 19, 2013	1.96
6	"Glücklich allein"	September 26, 2013	1.90
7	"Schöne Scheidung"	October 10, 2013	1.64
8	"Ein Ex zum Knutschen"	August 29, 2013	1.43
