= Ercan Durmaz =

Turkish-German actor (born 1965)

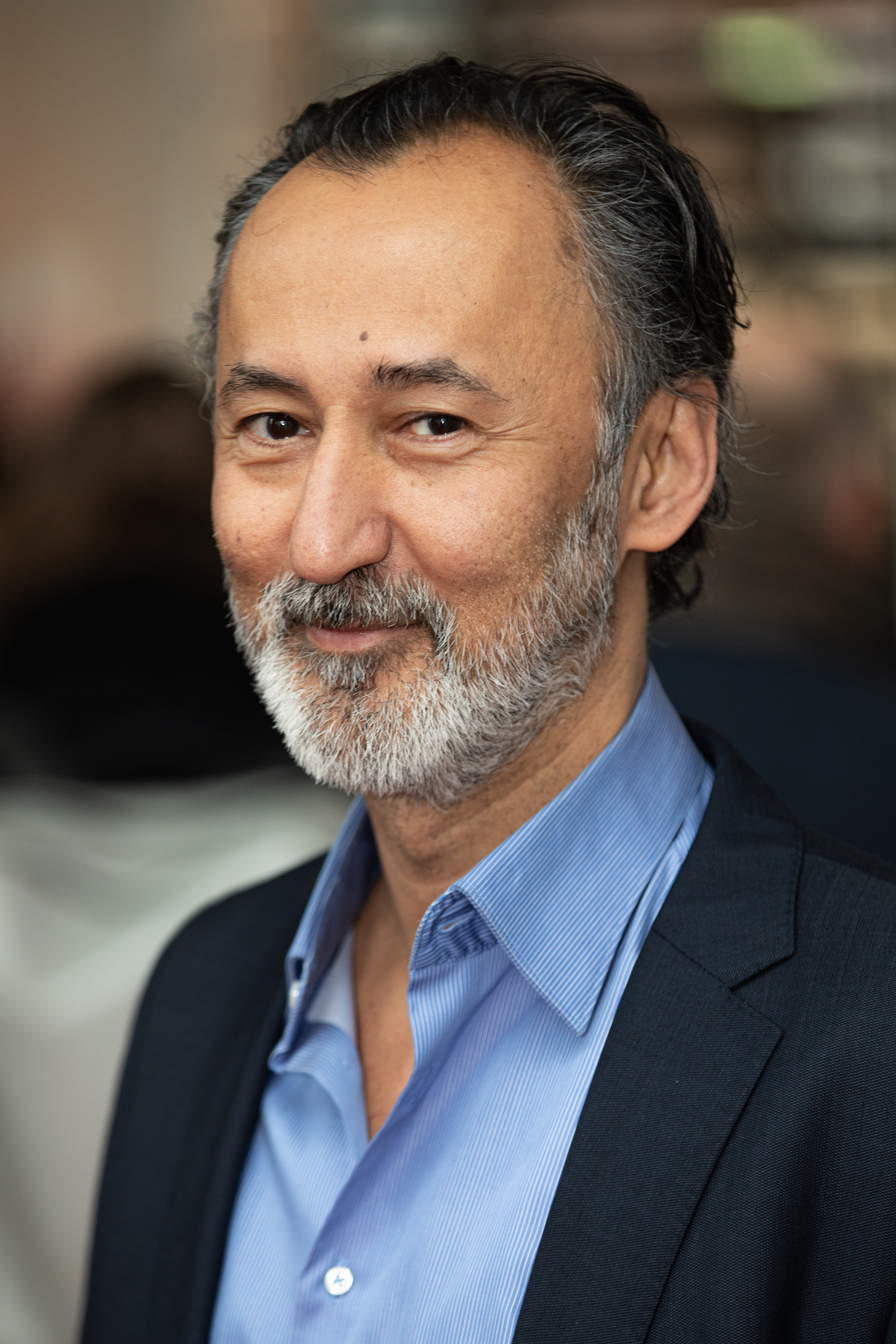
- Born: Ercan Durmaz; 16 August 1965 (age 60); Istanbul, Turkey
- Years active: 1995–present
- Website: http://www.ercandurmaz.de

Ercan Durmaz (born 16 August 1965) is a Turkish-German actor.

== Filmography ==
Film
Year	Film	Role	Notes
2019	Kopfplatzen	Dr Jawad	
2011	Hexe Lilli: Die Reise nach Mandolan	Abrash	
2005	Feuer	Jo	
2005	Bucuresti-Berlin	Kürün	
2004	Last Minute	Kawa	
2003	Fremder Freund	Assistant des Imam	
2003	September	Erkan	
2002	Sophiiiie!		
2000	Kanak Attack	Attila	
2000	A Handful of Grass	Uncle	
1999	'Ne günstige Gelegenheit	Otranto	
1999	St. Pauli Night		
1998	Kai Rabe gegen die Vatikankiller	Hesekiel	
1998	Me Boss, You Sneakers!		
1998	Aprilkinder		
1995	Bunte Hunde		

=== Television ===
Year	Film	Role	Notes
2015	Bettys Diagnose	Safi	217 episodes
2009	Heute keine Entlassung	Kemal Antes	post-production
2008	In letzter Sekunde	Abu 'Aiman' Gallaz	
2008	Below the Earth's Surface	Ali Uzun	
2008	Ein Fall für zwei	Hakan Tükür	2 episodes
2008	SOKO Kitzbühel	Enver Nikolla	1 episode
2007	SOKO Rhein-Main	Cem Pamuk	18 episodes
2007	R. I. S. – Die Sprache der Toten	Bülent Durmaz	1 episode
2007	Was nicht passt, wird passend gemacht	Mehmet 'Kümmel' Izlut	20 episodes
2006	Der beste Lehrer der Welt		
2006	SK Kölsch	Murat Doymaz	1 episode
2005	Nachtasyl	Hassan	
2005	Die Schrift des Freundes	Orhan	
2004	Nachtschicht	Felix Santini	2 episodes
2004	Cologne P.D.	Stan Karadeniz	1 episode
2003	Fremder Freund	Hassan	
1998–2003	Tatort	Dolemtscher Güler	2 episodes
2003	Die Wache	Becim Altan	1 episode
2002	Einsatz in Hamburg	Laszlo Kovazcievic	1 episode
2001	Run While You Can	Emile Rachid	
2001	Jenseits	Willy Schwarzbrot	
1999	Codename: Puma	Mehmet Schulz	unknown episodes
1999	The Blond Baboon	Pepe	
1999	Das Gelbe vom Ei	Emile Rachid	
1998	Polizeiruf 110		1 episode
1998	Lupo und der Muezzin	Mehmet	
1996	Landgang für Ringo		
1996	Doppelter Einsatz	Mehti	
2017	Wilder	Karim Al-Baroudi	
