= Das Phantom =

2000 film

- Based on: Das RAF-Phantom by Ekkehard Sieker; Wolfgang Landgraeber; Gerhard Wisnewski
- Written by: Dennis Gansel; Maggie Peren
- Directed by: Dennis Gansel
- Starring: Jürgen Vogel; Nadeshda Brennicke; Mathias Herrmann; Hilmi Sözer
- Theme music composer: Rainer Kühn
- Original language: German

Production
- Producers: Christian Becker; Michael Bütow; Benjamin Herrmann; Nina Maag; Thomas Häberle
- Cinematography: Axel Sand
- Editor: Jochen Retter
- Running time: 95 minutes

Original release
- Network: ProSieben
- Release: 4 May 2000

Das Phantom (The Phantom) is a 2000 German thriller TV movie directed by Dennis Gansel. It is based on the book Das RAF-Phantom and stars Jürgen Vogel.

== Plot ==
Policeman Leon Kramer (Vogel) and his partner Pit (Sözer) are observing two people in a car. When Leon goes to fetch some coffee, the two people in the car and Pit are killed. Suspicion is placed on Leon and, when his boss is also killed shortly thereafter, he becomes a fugitive. He learns that one of the two people he observed is an ex-Red Army Faction terrorist and the other is his former lawyer. A friend of the lawyer (Berricke) contacts Leon and gives him information about the RAF. The father of the dead terrorist also provides information. Leon learns that there may be a conspiracy among important people in the government using terrorist groups for their own purposes. Now they are after him.

== Cast ==
- Jürgen Vogel as Leo Kramer
- Nadeshda Brennicke as Anne
- Mathias Herrmann as Commissioner Faber
- Hilmi Sözer as Pit
- Peter Bongartz as Philipp Böhn
- Dietrich Hollinderbäumer as Baré
- Lukas Miko as Andreas Ganz
- Ulrich Pleitgen as Dr. Hausmann
- Thomas Holtzmann as Hans
- Carola Regnier as Sabine Ganz
- Wookie Mayer as Monica Hausmann
- Heinrich Giskes as Paul Dussous
- Hans-Jürgen Schmiebusch as Minister

== See also ==
- The Baader Meinhof Complex
