= Max Riemelt =

German actor (born 1984)

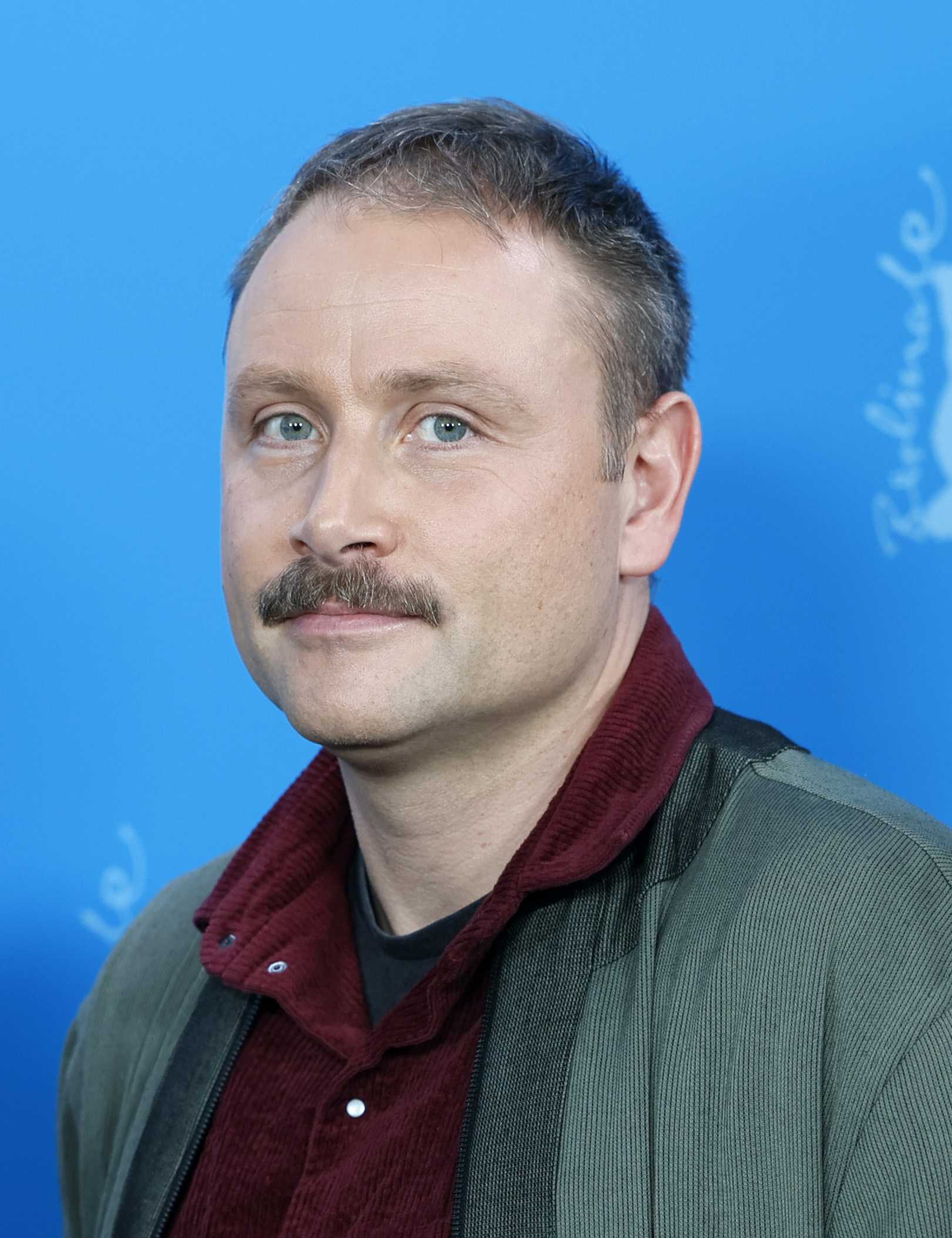
- Riemelt in 2026
- Born: 7 January 1984 (age 42); East Berlin, East Germany
- Occupation: Actor
- Years active: 1997–present
- Website: maxriemelt.com

Max Riemelt (born 7 January 1984) is a German actor. He is known internationally for playing Wolfgang Bogdanow in the Netflix series Sense8. In Germany, he is known for his many appearances on television and in films, including Before the Fall, Free Fall and the 2023 series Bonn. He has appeared in many productions directed by Dennis Gansel and Dominik Graf.

== Early life and education ==
Max Riemelt was born on 7 January 1984 in Mitte, East Berlin, which was in East Germany until he was six years old, and grew up in Berlin, Germany.

== Career ==
Riemelt's career began in Germany in 1997 at the age of 13, in the TV productions Eine Familie zum Küssen and Praxis Bülowbogen. The following year Riemelt played his first leading role in the ZDF Christmas series Zwei allein, directed by Matthias Steurer. He also had a cameo appearance in the video for the title song "Two of a Kind" by the Hamburg duo "R & B".

He starred in all of Dennis Gansel's feature films from Mädchen, Mädchen (2004) until The Fourth State (2012). In 2004 gained wide attention in Germany for his role in Gansel's World War II drama Before the Fall.

He starred in Dominik Graf's 2010 TV crime series In the Face of Crime (Im Angesicht des Verbrechens), and has collaborated numerous times with Graf as well as Dennis Gansel.

In 2013, he starred in the romance Free Fall, with Hanno Koffler, where he plays Kay, a police officer in training. The film depicts a gay love story and has been compared to Brokeback Mountain.

From 2015 to 2018, he starred in The Wachowskis' Netflix series Sense8, playing Wolfgang Bogdanow, a German safe cracker. The first season received positive reviews from critics.

He starred in the 2017 psychological thriller Berlin Syndrome alongside Australian actress Teresa Palmer, which premiered at the 2017 Sundance Film Festival. The film received generally favorable reviews, and both Palmer and Riemelt garnered praise for their performances.

In 2020, he joined the cast of The Matrix Resurrections.

In 2023 he played a leading role Bonn – Alte Freunde, neue Feinde, a political drama set in post-war West Germany in 1954.

== Personal life ==
Riemelt completed his school career with a high school diploma and refused military service. Riemelt is the father of a daughter and lives in Berlin.

== Awards ==
- 2004: Best Actor, Karlovy Vary International Film Festival, for Before the Fall
- 2006: Best Newcomer Actor, Bavarian Film Awards, for The Red Cockatoo
- 2006: Best Performance by an Actor in the Marrakech International Film Festival Awards, for his role in The Red Cockatoo

== Filmography ==
=== Film ===
Year	Title	Role
2003	Lottoschein ins Glück	Björn Michels
2004	Mädchen, Mädchen 2 – Loft oder Liebe	Flin
2004	Before the Fall	Friedrich Weimer
2005	Hallesche Kometen	Ingo
2005	Nachtasyl	Aljoscha
2006	The Red Cockatoo	Siggi
2006	Der Untergang der Pamir	Carl-Friedrich von Krempin
2007	GG 19 – Eine Reise durch Deutschland in 19 Artikeln	Edgar
2007	An die Grenze	Gefreiter Kerner
2007	Snipers Valley	Charly
2008	Up! Up! To the Sky	Arnold
2008	The Wave	Marco
2008	Run for Your Life!	Andreas Neidrig
2008	Tausend Ozeane	Meikel
2009	13 Semester	Momo
2010	We Are the Night	Tom
2011	A Family of Three	Lars
2011	Schandmal – Der Tote im Berg	Thomas Hafner
2011	Urban Explorer	Kris
2011	Playoff	Thomas
2012	The Fourth State	Dima
2012	Foreign Deployment	Daniel Gerber
2012	Heiter bis Wolkig	Tim
2012	The German Friend	Friedrich Burg
2012	Forgotten	Marcus
2013	Free Fall	Kay Engel
2013	Blutgeld	Ralf Seifert
2013	Der zweite Mann	Adrian Davids
2014	Elly Beinhorn: Solo Flight	Bernd Rosemeyer
2014	Warsaw 44	Johann Krauss
2014	To Life!	Jonas
2015	Lichtgestalten	
2015	Sanctuary	Bruder Krapp
2015	Amnesia	Jo Gellert
2015	Storno: Todsicher versichert	Rupert Halmer
2017	Berlin Syndrome	Andi
2019	Head Burst	Markus
2021	The Matrix Resurrections	Shepherd
2024	Zwei zu Eins	Robert
2025	The Tasters	Albert Ziegler

=== Television ===
Year	Title	Role	Notes
1998	Zwei allein	Max	
2002	Alphateam – Die Lebensretter im OP	Timo	1 episode
2003	Wolffs Revier	Harald Bernhard	1 episode
2003	Alarm for Cobra 11 – The Highway Police	Marcel Freese	1 episode
2003	In aller Freundschaft	Mirco Venske	1 episode
2004	Sextasy		Short film
2004	Balko	Ingo Grabowski	1 episode
2004	Neuland		Short film
2005	Feinde	Deutscher Soldat	Short film
2005	Videotagebuch von Dennis Gansel	Friedrich Weiemer / Himself	Short video
2006	Der Kriminalist	Michael Büssig	1 episode
2008	Die Zigarrenkiste	Tjark Evers	Short film
2008	Die Schattenboxer	Boxer	Short film
2010	Sehsüchte: Underworld	Young Man	Short film
2010	Im Angesicht des Verbrechens	Marek Gorsky	10 episodes
2011	Der Staatsanwalt	Markus Pohl	1 episode
2013	The Last Cop	Dennis Paschmann	1 episode
2015–2018	Sense8	Wolfgang Bogdanow	Main character
2019	Die Freundin meiner Mutter	Jan	TV film
2019	Der Schneegänger	Lutz Gehring	TV film
2019	World on Fire	Schmidt	Miniseries
2023	Bonn	Wolfgang Berns	Miniseries
2023	Schlafende Hunde (Sleeping Dog (English))	Mike Atlas	Miniseries
