= Before the Fall (2004 film) =

2004 film

- Directed by: Dennis Gansel
- Written by: Dennis Gansel; Maggie Peren
- Produced by: Viola Jäger; Harald Kügler; Molly von Fürstenberg
- Starring: Max Riemelt; Tom Schilling
- Cinematography: Torsten Breuer
- Edited by: Jochen Retter
- Music by: Angelo Badalamenti; Normand Corbeil
- Production company: Seven Pictures
- Distributed by: Constantin Film
- Release dates: 4 July 2004 (Karlovy Vary International Film Festival); 13 January 2005 (Germany)
- Running time: 114 minutes
- Country: Germany
- Language: German
- Box office: $3,764,219

Before the Fall (German: Napola – Elite für den Führer, literally "Napola – Elite for the Führer") is a 2004 German drama film written and directed by Dennis Gansel. It is set in a National Political Institutes of Education or "NaPolA" school developed by the Nazi Germany government. The military academies were designed as preparatory schools for the future Nazi elite.

== Plot ==
In 1942, the boxing skills of Friedrich Weimer earn him a place at a National Political Institute of Education (NaPolA), a boarding school that serves as an entry into the Nazi elite. His father, a regime-critical factory worker, refuses to allow Friedrich to enroll. Friedrich, who sees the school as his ticket to a better life, forges his father's signature on the permission slip and leaves at night. He hitchhikes to the (fictional) Napola of Allenstein. The same evening, he gains another new roommate, Albrecht Stein, with whom Friedrich becomes fast friends. The two boys help each other in class and through the school's harsh culture, which includes rigid discipline and older students bullying younger students, with teachers turning a blind eye or encouraging this behavior. In particular, Siegfried is mocked and humiliated for his bedwetting.

The school teaches the Nazi Party doctrine of the Rassenlehre, with sections of Hitler's and other National socialist's speeches and works being analyzed in classes. "Survival of the fittest" is advocated as a natural way of life, and Jews and enemies of the state are presented as treacherous and inferior.

The teacher and boxing trainer who helped to admit Friedrich instructs him to be ruthless in fights, dismissing compassion for opponents as "False pity”. Later, Friedrich receives a letter from his mother, informing him that his father was paid a visit by the Gestapo, which was arranged by this very teacher, and was subsequently forced to work double shifts as punishment..

Albrecht confides in Friedrich about his passion for writing and the arts, areas that his Gauleiter father deems unfit for men. He begins writing for the school newspaper, taking feedback from Friedrich.

When Friedrich has his first boxing match against another NaPolA school, he overpowers the other boy and knocks him down into a corner. Urged on by the shouts of his trainer, officials and other students, he delivers a brutal knockout and wins the match. Friedrich is congratulated by staff and students alike, but Albrecht scolds him for his act of cruelty.

One day, the sports instructor demonstrates the boys the use of live stick grenades. The first boys in Friedrich's year makes the throw successfully until one boy panics and drops it. The sports instructor screams at him, flees the trench and leaves his students to their fate. Siegfried then dives onto the grenade before it explodes, sacrificing himself to save his classmates. He is given a grand funeral at the school and is hailed as a martyr of the Fatherland. While the boy who panicked is expelled from the NaPolA, the instructor (who actually fled from the place) is commended in the following, another sign of the ruling double standards.

Albrecht invites Friedrich to visit the Stein family's mansion for the weekend. Gauleiter Heinrich Stein returns home with his friends from the German Army and Waffen-SS. He openly criticizes Albrecht for his sensitivity, artistic endeavors and lack of athleticism. A boxer himself, Stein shows far more interest in Friedrich than in his own son. He delights in Albrecht's inability to compete with Friedrich when the two are forced to fight a boxing match. The events of the weekend temporarily strain the boys' friendship.

In winter, a group of military vehicles arrive at the school. Friedrich's class is called outside, where Gauleiter Stein informs them that a group of Soviet prisoners-of-war have stolen weapons and escaped from a nearby village. The boys are armed with Karabiner 98k rifles and sent into the woods to search for them. Friedrich and Albrecht, assigned to the same group, spot a group of figures coming out of hiding and fleeing. The boys open fire and shoot each of the Soviets. Upon closer inspection, they are shocked to find that the prisoners are children. A horrified Albrecht tries to bandage the wounds of a surviving prisoner, but his father arrives with a search party and shoots him. As the boys are taken back to Allenstein, they see the rest of the prisoners-of-war being rounded up and shot dead.

In class the next day, Albrecht reads aloud an essay in which he condemns the execution of the prisoners-of-war; he describes it as a criminal act and that he himself has become part of the evil that he always wanted to fight when he was a child. Outraged, the school authorities summon his father, who tries to force Albrecht to apologize and retract his previous statements. The boy instead condemns his father for ordering the persecution and shooting of the prisoners. As a result of this, Gauleiter Stein announces that in a few days he will take his son from the school in order to fight on the Eastern Front in Ukraine, which is equivalent to being sent to his death.

The next morning, the sports instructor takes the class out onto a frozen lake. Two holes have been made in the ice, and each boy must dive in one and swim to the other, using a rope as a guide. Friedrich makes the swim through the freezing water and Albrecht dives in next. When Albrecht does not emerge, Friedrich runs over and finds him halfway between the holes. Realizing that Albrecht deliberately stopped under the ice with the intention to commit suicide, Friedrich screams for his friend. Hearing Friedrich's shouts, Albrecht looks up and gives him a shake of his head. Albrecht lets go of the rope and sinks, vanishing from sight. Deeply grieved, Friedrich writes an obituary for Albrecht and asks the headmaster to publish it in the school newspaper. The headmaster refuses and states, "Amidst people who have died for Führer, Fatherland and Nation, there is no place for suicides".

Friedrich is due to fight in a boxing match against the NaPolA school in Potsdam. He is informed that his future at Allenstein is tied to the outcome of this match. Scouts from German universities are in the audience as well as Gauleiter Stein, who dismisses his son's suicide as an act of weakness. Despite overpowering his opponent, Friedrich decides not to deliver the final strike, having now become disillusioned with the school and its ideology. The other boy recovers and punches Friedrich, who stands impassively until he is knocked out, leaving the Allenstein school bewildered and humiliated.

The next day, the headmaster expels Friedrich, stripping the boy of his uniform and forcing him to walk naked back to his room. The boy is forbidden to speak to any of his roommates as he hastily dresses in his summer clothes and packs his belongings. He is promptly escorted out of the school gates. Friedrich looks back at Allenstein one more time before walking out into the falling snow.

The closing narration states:

Until 1945, there were in the German Reich around 40 National Political Educational Institutes with more than 15,000 students. When the war was finally acknowledged as being lost, they were sent out into the "Final Struggle". Blinded by instructed fanaticism and insufficiently armed, they still offered bitter resistance in many battles. Half of them died.

== Cast ==
- Max Riemelt as Friedrich Weimer
- Tom Schilling as Albrecht Stein
- Jonas Jägermeyr as Christoph Schneider
- Leon Alexander Kersten as Tjaden
- Thomas Drechsel as Hefe
- Alexander Held as Friedrich's father
- Martin Goeres as Siegfried 'Siggi' Gladen
- Florian Stetter as Justus von Jaucher
- Devid Striesow as Heinrich Vogler
- Joachim Bissmeier as Dr. Karl Klein 'Karl der Große' / Anstaltsleiter
- Michael Schenk as Josef Peiner 'Peiniger' / Sportlehrer
- Justus von Dohnanyi as Gauleiter Heinrich Stein
- Claudia Michelsen as Frau Stein
- Julie Engelbrecht as Katharina
- Johannes Zirner as Torben Send
- Dennis Gansel as Boxing Trainer

== Production ==
Bouzov Castle, in the Czech Republic, was used as the location for the fictitious school named Allenstein in the film. Gansel's goal was for the film to feel very authentic and was advised by a former student of a Napola. Gansel drew inspiration from his right-wing grandfather who was a teacher in a Napola. Gansel's grandfather explained that it was the feeling of endless opportunities that came along with wearing the teachers military uniform and his own failed dream of becoming an architect that had attracted him to the movement. The character of Friedrich ended up being partly based on Gansel's grandfather. Dennis Gansel named Bernardo Bertolucci's The Conformist as an influence.

== Reception ==
The film gained an approval rating of 67% on Rotten Tomatoes with 26 out of 39 reviews calling it fresh.

== Awards ==
- Best direction, Bavarian Film Awards, 2005
- Best international film, Hamptons International Film Festival, 2004
- Best actor, Max Riemelt, Karlovy Vary International Film Festival, 2004
- Best film, Viareggio EuropaCinema, 2004
