= Mädchen, Mädchen 2 – Loft oder Liebe =

2004 German film directed by Peter Gersina

Mädchen, Mädchen 2 - Loft oder Liebe
- Directed by: Peter Gersina
- Written by: Maggie Peren
- Starring: Diana Amft; Karoline Herfurth; Jasmin Gerat
- Production company: Olga-Film
- Distributed by: Constantin Film
- Release date: 17 June 2004
- Running time: 88 minutes
- Country: Germany
- Language: German

Mädchen, Mädchen 2 – Loft oder Liebe (Girls On Top 2) is a 2004 German-language comedic film directed by Peter Gersina. The movie is the second movie about Inken (Diana Amft) and her friend Lena (Karoline Herfurth) decide to go in search of a flat of their own after leaving home. The character Vicky from the first movie (played by Felicitas Woll) is not in this movie and a new friend Lucy (Jasmin Gerat) is an added character. They despair at the price of property in Munich and decide to try to find a rich man to help them in their exploits.

The movie is available on DVD.
