= Dennis Gansel =

German film director and writer

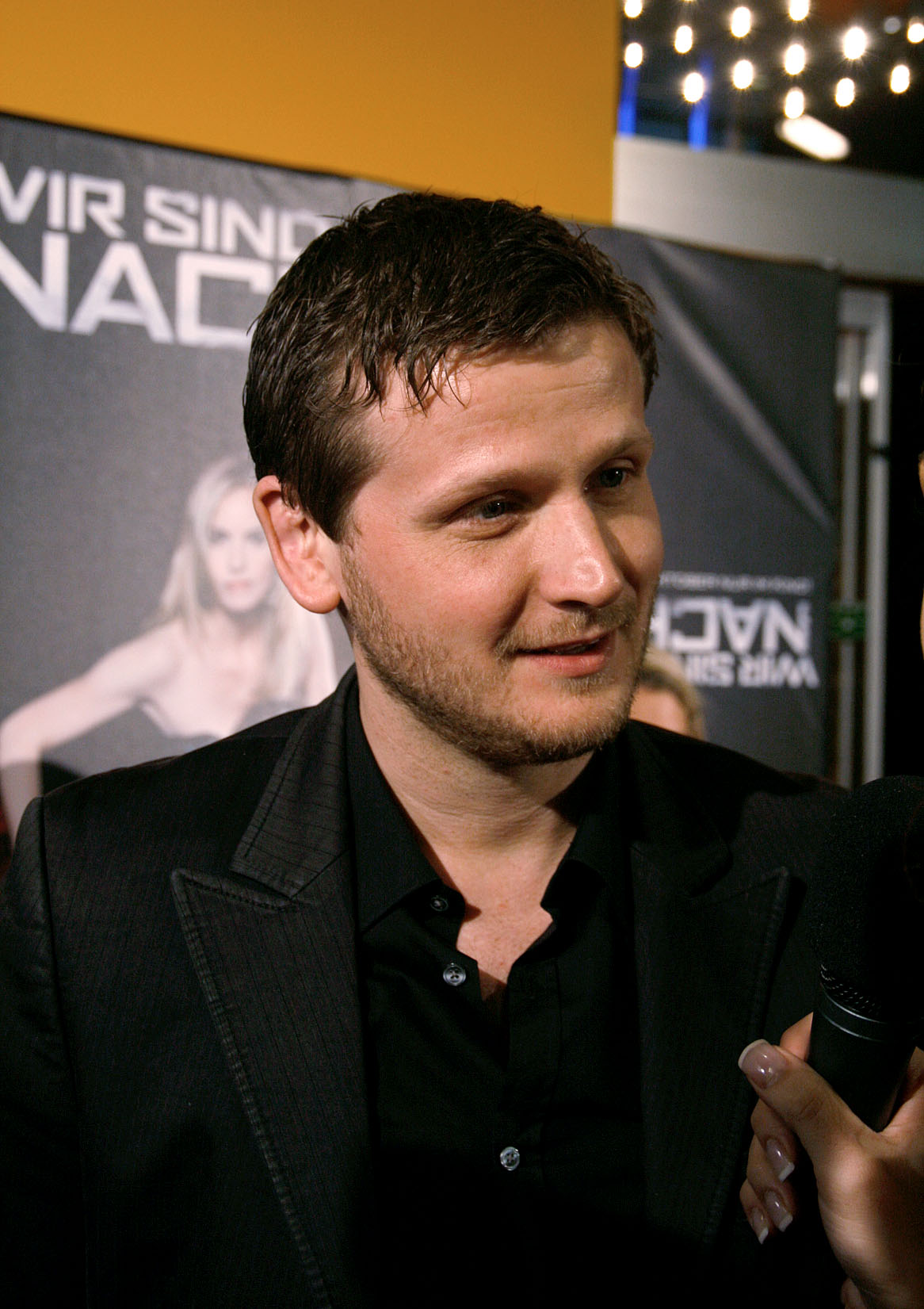
- Gansel in 2010
- Born: 4 October 1973 (age 53); Hannover, West Germany (now Germany)
- Occupations: Film director, screenwriter
- Years active: 1995–present

Dennis Gansel (born 4 October 1973) is a German film director and screenwriter.

== Life and career ==
Gansel was born in 1973 in Hannover, where he graduated from high school in 1993. Gansel worked in the festivals for film and television and chose to dedicate his compulsory service to helping disabled people. During this time, he prepared himself for film school. He studied at University of Television and Film Munich for 5 years. Gansel is best known for directing The Wave and his following project; the vampire film We Are The Night, which starred Karoline Herfurth, Nina Hoss, Jennifer Ulrich, Anna Fischer and Max Riemelt.

Other than directing, Gansel has also tried acting. He has had several small roles in his own movies as wells as others.

Gansel frequently casts Max Riemelt in his films and frequently works with editor Jochen Retter and composer/musician Heiko Maile. His favourite director is Sydney Pollack.

== Filmography ==
Year	Title	Role	Notes
1996	The Wrong Trip		Director, Short
1997	Living Dead		Short
1998	Im Auftrag des Herrn	Ben	Short
2000	Das Phantom		Director, TV Movie
2001	Mädchen, Mädchen	Mailman	Director, also actor
2004	Before the Fall	Boxing Trainer	Director, also actor
2007	Neues vom Wixxer	Singender Bobby 1	
2008	The Wave	Hängengebliebener	Director, also actor
2009	Men in the City	Lars	
2010	We Are the Night		Director
2011	205 – Room of Fear	Psychiatrist	
2012	The Fourth State	Taxi Driver	Director, also actor (uncredited)
2016	Mechanic: Resurrection		Director
2018	Jim Button and Luke the Engine Driver		Director
2019	Berlin, I Love You		Director, (segment Embassy)
2020	Jim Button and the Wild 13		Director
2025	Fatherland		Director
2025	Der Tiger		Director

== German Awards ==
- F.W. Murnau Kurzfilmpreis for The Wrong Trip
- F.W. Murnau Kurzfilmpreis for Living Dead
- Adolf-Grimme-Preis 2001 for Das Phantom
- Bundesfilmpreis 2003 best unpicturized script for Before the Fall
- Bayerischer Filmpreis 2005 for Before the Fall
- Deutscher Filmpreis LOLA Bronze for The Wave
- Sitges – Special Prize of the Jury for We Are The Night
