= Die ProSieben Märchenstunde =

German television series

- Starring: Thomas Fritsch; Bernhard Hoëcker
- Country of origin: Germany
- No. of episodes: 16

Production
- Running time: approx. 0:45 (per episode)

Original release
- Network: ProSieben
- Release: 20 March 2006 – present

Die ProSieben Märchenstunde ("ProSieben Fairy Tale Hour") is a television movie series that has been produced since 2006. It features characters that are exclusively portrayed by German and Austrian comedians and actors. The series is shot in Prague.

The screenplays have—amongst others—been written by Tommy Krappweis, Erik Haffner and Norman Cöster who came up with the stories of Bernd das Brot. Additionally, they are directing and have cameo appearances. Many actors use their respective dialect.

Die ProSieben Märchenstunde was nominated for the German Comedy Award in the category Best Comedy in 2006. It is also broadcast on Austrian television channel ORF, which is co-producing the series, airing the programme as Die ORF Märchenstunde.

== Premise ==
Every episode satirises a fairy tale classic like Little Red Riding Hood or Rapunzel. In doing so, the whole plot, characters or even the ending of the tale is rewritten. That's why there is no speaking frog in The Frog Prince, for example. Additionally there are references to popular movies, television series and commercials again and again. The movie series that is produced by Rat Pack Filmproduktion uses known actors and comedy celebrities, predominantly.

Members of the permanent cast are the narrator (Thomas Fritsch) as well as his "assistant" Bruto, a medieval executioner whose task it is to remove Bernhard Hoëcker who keeps trying to be part of the story or to change the story. The narrator always thanks with a sarcastically relieved "Thanks, Bruto!".

== Episodes ==
=== Season 1 ===
- Rotkäppchen – Wege zum Glück (Little Red Riding Hood – Ways Towards Happiness)

Plot: Little Red Riding Hood wants to become a singer and prepares for the king's casting show with the deceitful Mr. Wolf.
Title reference: Wege zum Glück, German Telenovela
Actors: Julia Stinshoff, Christian Tramitz, Wigald Boning, Karl Dall, Michael Kessler, Nadja Maleh, and Heinz Hoenig.

- Rapunzel oder Mord ist ihr Hobby (Rapunzel – or Murder, She Wrote)

Plot: Prince Helmold von Poppel tries to solve the case of the lost Rapunzel.
Title reference: Murder, She Wrote, US American crime series
Actors: Oliver Wnuk, Axel Stein, Mike Krüger, Karl Markovics, Heinrich Schafmeister, Janin Reinhardt, Mirja Boes and Annette Frier

- Zwerg Nase – Vier Fäuste für ein Zauberkraut (My Name Is Little Longnose)

Plot: The evil witch casts a spell on the bigheaded Jacob which makes him grow an ugly nose. To break the curse, he cooperates with former bodyguard Muskete.
Title reference: Various films with Terence Hill and Bud Spencer (e. g. My Name Is Trinity, Trinity Is STILL My Name!)
Actors: Manou Lubowski, Christian Tramitz, Julia Dietze, Wolfgang Völz, Christian Clerici, Simon Gosejohann, Ralf Zacherl, Mundstuhl and Sonja Kirchberger

- Rumpelstilzchen – Auf Wache im Märchenwald (Rumpelstiltskin – Forest Watch in the Fairy Tale Woods)

Plot: Fairy Tale Forest Watch 3, Captain Hollerbusch, Lance Corporal "Jojo" Johannes and Private Bruno "Keule" hunt for Rumpelstiltskin and are accompanied by a television team.
Title reference: The City Watch stories of the city Ankh-Morpork on discworld; setting of countless humorous novels by English writer Terry Pratchett.
Actors: Oliver Kalkofe, Bürger Lars Dietrich, Sonya Kraus, Tetje Mierendorf, Janine Kunze, Erkan & Stefan and Herbert Feuerstein

- Tischlein deck dich – Esel, Ziegen, echte Männer (The Wishing-Table - Donkeys, Goats, Real Men)

Plot: The digger's sons Albert, Martin and Jacob have to make their own way in the world. They are given a "gold-ass", a "wishing-table" and a "cudgel in the sack" by their respective taskmasters.
Actors: Elton, Tobias Schenke, Ingo Naujoks, Lukas Resetarits and Ralf Richter

- Hans im Glück – Tauschrausch im Märchenwald (Luck Hans – Trading Spree in the Fairy Tale Woods)

Plot: Hans gets a nugget of gold from his crazy master at the end of his period of training. Unfortunately Hans is addicted to trading.
Actors: Christian Ulmen, Ingo Appelt, Nora Tschirner and Joseph Hannesschläger

- Der Froschkönig – Im Brunnen hört dich niemand schreien (The Frog Prince – In the well no one can hear you scream)

Plot: Prince Hohlholm von Sülzenstein tumbles into the castle well and ends up in a different well somewhere else. The princess there, Dorothea von Hagerburg, believes him to be a speaking frog.
Title reference: Various German titles for horror movies and thrillers (e. g. Alien – Im Weltraum hört dich niemand schreien (Alien – In space no one can hear you scream))
Actors: Hugo Egon Balder, Frank Giering, Alexandra Neldel, Michael Kessler, Tommy Krappweis, Gerd Ekken-Gerdes and Heinz Werner Kraehkamp

- Frau Holle – Im Himmel ist die Hölle los (Mother Hulda – All Hell Breaks Loose In Heaven)

Plot: The golden girl is in fact a snobbish, exhausting bitch called Chantal. When she falls into the well, her sister has to save her. Both end up in the world of Mother Hulda where nothing can be done without causing chaos on earth.
Title reference: Auf dem Highway ist die Hölle los, German title of the US American action comedy The Cannonball Run
Actors: Hella von Sinnen, Jana Pallaske, Mirjam Weichselbraun, Kalle Pohl, Mareike Carrière, Bernd das Brot, Peter Nottmeier and Heinz Werner Kraehkamp

=== Season 2 ===
- Der gestiefelte Kater – Catman begins (Puss in Boots – Catman Begins)

Plot: Miller's son Tobias lies comatose in the castle. At the same time a masked puss in boots is fighting against evil.
Title reference: Batman Begins, US American cartoon movie adaptation
Actors: Elmar Gunsch, Wolf Roth, Sven Ottke, Daniel Krauss, Wolke Hegenbarth, Hugo Egon Balder, Johann König and Martin Semmelrogge

- Aschenputtel – Für eine Handvoll Tauben (Cinderella – A Fistful of Doves)

Plot: Petunia Rosentau is a maidservant of her evil aunt and their daughters. Nevertheless, she is supposed to marry the ugly and evil prince. The stable boy Richard is the only one that can save her.
Title reference: A Fistful of Dollars, Spaghetti Western by Sergio Leone (1964)
Actors: Daniela Preuss, Bettina Lamprecht, Christine Kaufmann, Mathieu Carrière, Michael Kessler, Chris Howland, Sonja Kirchberger, Hennes Bender, Chiara Schoras and Dominique Horwitz

- Die Prinzessin auf der Erbse – Qual der Wahl Royal (The Princess and the Pea – Heavy is the Head that Wears the Crown)

Plot: Vroni, a pea farmer's daughter hates peas but loves Prince Herold. To get him, she has to pass several princess tests first.
Actors: Diana Amft, Ernst Hilbich, Matthias Knop, Jasmin Tabatabai, Nova Meierhenrich, Sonya Kraus, Herbert Feuerstein und Jan Sosniok

- Hänsel und Gretel – Ein Fall für die Supergranny (Hansel and Gretel – A Case For Supergranny)

Plot: The cheeky devils Hansel and Gretel are terrorising the whole town. That is why they are sent to an education camp run by a strict witch.
Title reference: Supernanny, educational programme airing on RTL in Germany
Actors: Axel Stein, Janin Reinhardt, Gudrun Landgrebe, Oliver Kalkofe, Oliver Welke, Simon Gosejohann and Tilo Prückner

- Schneewittchen – 7 Zipfel und ein Horst (Snow White – Seven Dwarfs and a Horst)

Plot: The pampered only child runs away from her new schizophrenic stepmother Aulrauna and disguises herself as Horst to stay with the dwarfs.
Actors: Felicitas Woll, Oliver K. Wnuk, Katja Flint, Helmut Zierl, Hilmi Sözer, Christian Tramitz and Ingo Appelt

- Des Kaisers neue Kleider – Mode, Mob und Monarchie (The Emperor's New Clothes – Fashion, Mob and Monarchy)

Plot: The new emperor, a despot with a clothes fetish annoys his people with his extravagance and ignites a revolution.
Actors: Oliver Korittke, Manuel Cortez, Christian Tramitz, Dirk Bach, Friederike Kempter and Jutta Speidel

- König Drosselbart – Der Schöne und das Biest (King Thrushbeard – The Beauty and the Beast)

Plot: The arrogant princess is married to a beggar by her father who is fed up by her airs and graces. That's why for the first time in her life, she has to work.
Title reference: Beauty and the Beast, French fairy tale
Actors: Jeanette Biedermann, Kai Lentrodt, Christoph M. Ohrt, Eva Habermann and Johanna Klum

- Dornröschen – Ab durch die Hecke (Sleeping Beauty – Over the Hedge)

Plot: After the birth of the princess all wise women of the country – except for one with a personal hygiene problem – are invited. The woman that was not invited is offended and curses the princess. So she is pampered for 18 years to avoid her pricking her finger on a spindle.
Title reference: Over the Hedge, a 2006 US American animated movie
Actors: Josefine Preuß, Florian David Fitz, Horst Janson, Oliver Petszokat, Anja Kruse, Ilja Richter, Tanja Mairhofer and Rainer Basedow

== DVD release ==
All episodes are available on DVD. Each DVD contains two episodes and specials.
