= Berlin, Berlin (film) =

2020 German romantic comedy film

- Film poster
- Directed by: Franziska Meyer Price
- Written by: David Safier
- Starring: Felicitas Woll; Jan Sosniok; Matthias Klimsa
- Distributed by: Netflix
- Release date: May 8, 2020
- Running time: 80 minutes
- Country: Germany
- Language: German

Berlin, Berlin is a 2020 romantic comedy film directed by Franziska Meyer Price, written by David Safier and starring Felicitas Woll, Jan Sosniok, and Matthias Klimsa.

It is a sequel to the television series Berlin, Berlin (2002–2005).

== Cast ==
- Felicitas Woll as Lolle
- Jan Sosniok as Sven Ehlers
- Matthias Klimsa as Hart
- Janina Uhse as Dana
- Detlev Buck as Judge
- Armin Rohde as Motzmann
- Christian Tramitz as Schuldirektor
- Farouk El-Khalili as Akay
- Kai Lentrodt as Harald
- Kailas Mahadevan as Blue Bull
- Gitta Schweighöfer as Helene
- Sandra Borgmann as Rosalie Butzke

== Release ==
Berlin, Berlin was released on May 8, 2020.
