= Sandra Borgmann =

German actress (born 1974)

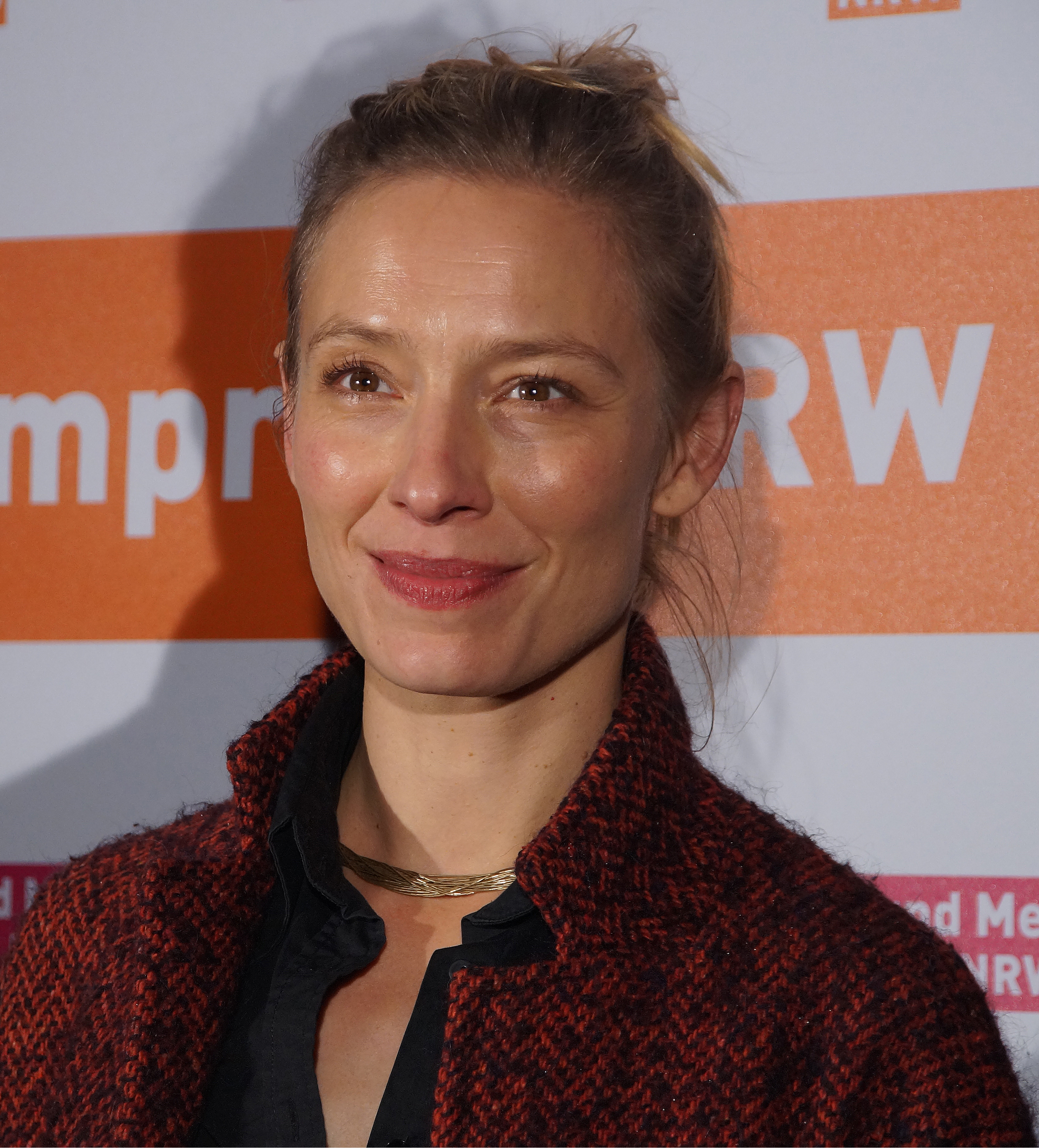
- Borgmann in 2016
- Born: 1974 (age 51–52); Mülheim, North Rhine-Westphalia, West Germany
- Occupation: Actress
- Years active: 1997–present
- Known for: Tatort; Dark

Sandra Borgmann (born 1974) is a German actress.

== Biography ==
Borgmann is originally from Mülheim and studied German, philosophy, and history. She attended the Folkwang University of the Arts in Essen and joined a theater troupe. She has worked as an actress since 1997. She became known for early roles in Oi! Warning and Hotel Elfie. Borgmann frequently portrays the villain in TV roles, such as in Tatort and Polizeiruf 110.

In 2004, Borgmann was nominated at the German Television Awards in the category Best Actress – supporting role, for her performance in that year's Tatort serialized film.

From 2019 to 2020, she played the character of grown-up Elisabeth Doppler in the second season of the Netflix show Dark.

Borgmann lives in Hamburg and has a son.

== Selected filmography ==
=== Film ===
List of film appearances, with year, title, and role shown
Year	Title	Role	Notes
2000	In July	Marion	
2000	Oi! Warning	Sandra	
2008	The Baader Meinhof Complex	Sieglinde Hofmann	
2013	Das Kleine Gespenst	Karl's mother	
2020	Berlin, Berlin	Rosalie Butzke	

=== Television ===
List of television appearances, with year, title, and role shown
Year	Title	Role	Notes
1998	Die Anrheiner		6 episodes
2000	Hotel Elfie	Cora Blitz	13 episodes
2000	Tatort	Claudia Adam	1 episode
2000	Leipzig Homicide		
2001	Tatort	Mona Dittus	1 episode
2001	Küstenwache		
2002–2003	Berlin, Berlin	Rosalie Butzke	28 episodes
2003	Tatort	Laura Lord	1 episode
2003	Ladykracher		1 season
2004	Tatort	Astrid Gehrmeier	1 episode
2005	Mit Herz und Handschellen		
2006	Tatort	Christiane Hecht	1 episode
2006	Rosa Roth		
2006	Das Duo	Kerstin Steiner	1 episode
2006	Vier gegen Z		
2007	Großstadtrevier		
2007	KDD – Kriminaldauerdienst		6 episodes
2008	Cologne P.D.		
2008	Tatort	Stephanie	1 episode
2008	Post Mortem		
2008	Lutter	Sina Kaschinski	1 episode
2008	Die Anwälte	Claudia Bristow	7 episodes
2008	Stubbe – Von Fall zu Fall	Sabine Gerber	1 episode
2008	Im Namen des Gesetzes		4 episodes
2009	Tatort	Ivonne Schneider	1 episode
2009	SOKO Kitzbühel		1 episode
2010	Lutter	Sina Kaschinski	1 episode
2011	Alarm für Cobra 11 – Die Autobahnpolizei		1 episode
2012	Mord mit Aussicht		
2012–2015	Die LottoKönige	Claudia König	18 episodes
2013	Tatort	Anne Brenner/Ruth Junghanns	2 episodes
2014	Polizeiruf 110	Martina Reuter	1 episode
2014	Die Chefin		1 episode
2014	Cologne P.D.		1 episode
2014	Heiter bis tödlich: Morden im Norden		1 episode
2015–2016	Sibel & Max	Sophie Stein	22 episodes
2016	Tatort	Katja Fischer	1 episode
2016	Wilsberg	Dr. Zacher	1 episode
2018	SOKO Donau		1 episode
2018	SOKO München		1 episode
2018	Großstadtrevier		1 episode
2018	Einstein		1 episode
2018	Cologne P.D.		1 episode
2018	Alarm für Cobra 11 – Die Autobahnpolizei		2 episodes
2019–2020	Dark	Elisabeth Doppler	
2019	Skylines	Dagmar	
