= Uhse =

Uhse (German pronunciation: [ˈʔuːzə]) is a German surname. Notable people with this surname include:

- Beate Uhse-Rotermund (1919–2001), German pilot and entrepreneur
- Bodo Uhse (1904–1963), German writer, journalist, and political activist
- Janina Uhse (born 1989), German actress
