= Unsere Zeit ist jetzt =

- Theatrical release poster
- Directed by: Martin Schreier
- Written by: Arend Remmers
- Produced by: Til Schweiger; Tom Zickler
- Starring: Peri Baumeister; David Schütter; Marc Benjamin; Cro; Til Schweiger
- Cinematography: Markus Nestroy
- Edited by: Robert Kummer; Martin Schreier; Til Schweiger
- Music by: Cro; Martin Todsharow; Lillo Scrimali
- Production companies: Mr. Brown Entertainment; Chimperator Films; Barefoot Films; Warner Bros. Film Productions Germany
- Distributed by: Warner Bros. Pictures
- Release date: 6 October 2016
- Running time: 118 minutes
- Country: Germany
- Language: German

Unsere Zeit ist jetzt (Our Time is Now) is a 2016 German comedy film directed by Martin Schreier and starring musician Cro.

== Plot ==
The German rapper Cro wants to make a film and starts an idea competition. Among the many submissions, three completely different concepts convince him: The autistic (Asperger's) film student Vanessa plans to make a documentary about the rapper's life; comic artist Ludwig has an animated film about his origin in the rap business in mind; and the screenwriter Dawid wants to film the life of Cro 30 years in the future. During the filming, the three get closer and develop a deeper relationship.

== Cast ==
- Peri Baumeister as Vanessa
- David Schütter as Dawid
- Marc Benjamin as Ludwig
- Cro as himself
- Til Schweiger as himself
- Wotan Wilke Möhring as Basti
- Tim Wilde as Chef
- Bjarne Mädel as Rudolph
- Jeanette Hain as Gabriele
- Janina Uhse as Annika
- Emilia Schüle as Anna
