= Berlin, Berlin =

- Written by: David Safier
- Starring: Felicitas Woll, Jan Sosniok
- Country of origin: Germany
- Original language: German
- No. of seasons: 4
- No. of episodes: 86

Production
- Running time: 25 min

Original release
- Network: ARD
- Release: 2002 – 2005

Berlin, Berlin is a television series produced for the ARD. It aired in Germany from 2002 to 2005 Tuesdays through Fridays at 18:50 on the German public TV network Das Erste. The show won both national and international awards.

A sequel film, Berlin, Berlin, was released on Netflix on May 8, 2020.

== Plot ==
The series tells the story of Lolle (played by Felicitas Woll) who, after finishing school, follows her boyfriend, Tom, from Malente to Berlin. Once there, she discovers that Tom has been cheating on her with another girl. Rather than move back home, Lolle decides to stay in Berlin with her cousin, Sven (played by Jan Sosniok), his best friends Hart (Matthias Klimsa) and Rosalie (Sandra Borgmann). At the end of season one Lolle and Sven fall in love with each other, even though they are second cousins. Their grandparents were siblings, as is revealed in the first episode when Daniel, Sven's son, asks Lolle how she is related to him.

Before getting into a relationship with Lolle, Sven instead decides to go back to his former wife, Silvia, because of Daniel. Season one also follows Lolle's relationship with the ex-girlfriend, Rosalie, of Tom's new girlfriend. At the end of season one, Rosalie, an actress, leaves Germany to go to the USA and pursue a new life.

At the beginning of season two Lolle, desperate after losing Sven to Silvia and Rosalie's departure to the USA, she finds a new friend with Rosalie's former girlfriend, Sara (Rhea Harder). At first Lolle wants to convince Sven to love her, but he seems to be undecided and is unsure of what he should do. She then meets Alex, an art student, and they become a couple. Sven separates from Silvia once more, however, and is now free to be with Lolle, but she replies that she should stay with Alex. At the end of season two, she realizes that she loves Sven too, and attempts being with both Sven and Alex. Hart also begins to acknowledge his love for Sarah, and after a series of problems, they get together.

== Cast ==
Role	Actor	Season
Carlotta "Lolle" Holzmann	Felicitas Woll	1 - 4
Sven Ehlers	Jan Sosniok	1 - 4
Hard	Matthias Klimsa	1 - 4
Rosalie Butzke	Sandra Borgmann	1
Sarah Hermann	Rhea Harder	2 - 4
Alex Weingart	Matthias Schloo	2 - 3
Vero Gol - Sawatzki	Alexandra Neldel	3 - 4
Tuhan	Maverick Quek	1 - 4
Lenny	Alexander Scheer	2 - 4
Felix	Florian David Fitz	4

== Episodes ==
Series One (2002)

1. Landflucht (Pilot)
2. Wie bekomme ich meinen Freund zurück
3. Happy Birthday, Lolle
4. Auf der Flucht
5. Rotalarm
6. Ich will Sandra Bullock massieren
7. Selbstversuch
8. All you need is love
9. Träume
10. Lolle und der Traumprinz
11. Nicht ganz koscher
12. Die Geliebte
13. Singles
14. Dr. Strangelove
15. Lesbe sein dagegen sehr
16. Küssen, küssen, küssen
17. Lolle gegen Fatman
18. Ich bin nicht nett
19. Beste Freunde
20. Taddi und Mr. Psycho
21. Cousin und Cousine
22. Extremsitutionen ...
23. Martha
24. Überraschungen
25. Eine Million
26. Positiv ist negativ

Series Two (2003)

1. Lolle allein in Berlin
2. Frisch verheiratet
3. Cinderello
4. Froschkönige
5. Höllendate
6. Männer sind auch nur Menschen
7. Malente, Malente
8. Eltern, früher oder später kriegen sie dich
9. Looking for Beinlich
10. Nicht fair
11. Wer liebt Fatman?
12. Big and Beautiful
13. Kairo
14. That's the way
15. Ex und hopp
16. Spieglein, Spieglein
17. Gegen die Uhr
18. 20 Minuten
19. Ich lieb dich nicht - du liebst mich nicht
20. Aha

Series Three (2004)

1. Sven oder Alex?
2. Alex oder Sven
3. Nimm Zwei
4. Nicht genug
5. Jung, dynamisch, arbeitslos
6. Backe, backe Kuchen
7. Mütter und Töchter
8. Ziemlich ähnlich
9. Generationen
10. Hochzeitsspiele
11. Svenja
12. Täuschen, tarnen, küssen
13. Vero
14. That's what friends are for
15. The weapons of women
16. The ghosts I called
17. Again with feeling
18. Daily Talk
19. Dream job
20. Wickie

Series Four (2005)

1. Stuttgart - Stuttgart
2. Real friends
3. At first Blick
4. fear is stupid
5. happy family
6. had pig
7. love is…
8. revenge is…
9. what if
10. fate
11. Silvia
12. Rituals
13. Hero of the Year
14. Be Hard
15. The wedding dress
16. Deus ex machina
17. Hormones are stupid
18. Weekend in the country
19. The wedding
20. Melbourne, Melbourne (Finale)

== Awards ==
In 2004 the series won an International Emmy Award in the category "Best Comedy" for Episode 47.
