= David Safier =

German writer and novelist

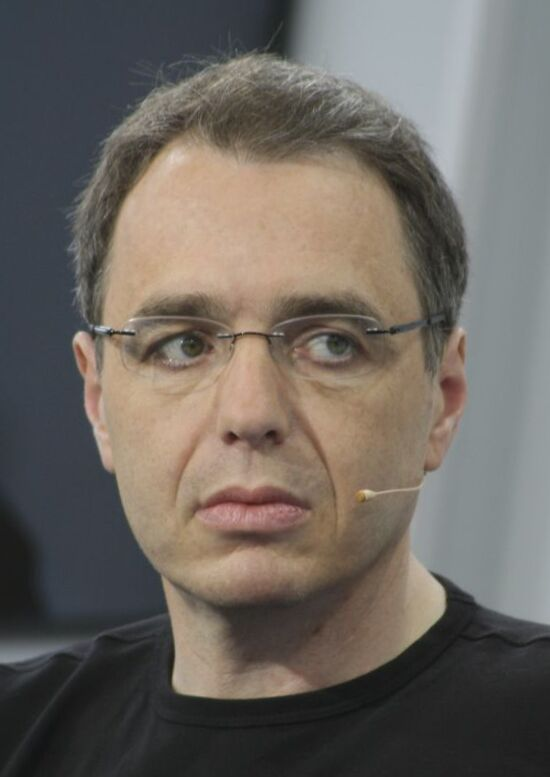
- Safier in 2014
- Born: 13 December 1966 (age 59); Bremen, West Germany
- Occupations: Writer; novelist
- Writing career
- Notable work: Berlin, Berlin
- Notable awards: Grimme-Preis (2003)

David Safier (German: ['sa:fiɐ]; born 13 December 1966 in Bremen) is a German writer and novelist. He wrote the television series Berlin, Berlin for which he was awarded the Adolf Grimme Award in 2003. Berlin, Berlin also won an International Emmy Award for best comedy in 2004. He has written several novels, among them Mieses Karma and Jesus liebt mich, which together sold two million copies, as well as Plötzlich Shakespeare, Happy Family, Muh! and Mieses Karma hoch 2. He also wrote 28 Tage lang.

== Works ==
=== Mieses Karma (2009) ===
Mieses Karma (Bad Karma) was Safier’s debut novel. Kim Lange, a successful but unscrupulous TV presenter, has won the award she had long hoped for. Unfortunately, she is crushed to death by falling debris from a Russian space station the same night. Having amassed a considerable amount of bad karma, she is reborn as an ant. Her purpose now is to collect good karma in order to climb back up the ladder of reincarnation and regain a spot in the hearts of her loved ones.

Kim’s husband in the novel is named Alex Weingart, as is one of the characters in Berlin, Berlin.

The novel was also turned into a radio play. In 2011, publisher Kosmos Verlag released a board game based on the novel.

- Safier, David; Spier, Nana (2021), Mieses Karma (in German), [Hamburg]: BücherWege, ISBN 978-3-96500-030-8, OCLC 1350764982
- Safier, David; Brownjohn, John (2010). Bad karma. Oxford: Beaufoy Books. ISBN 978-1-906780-36-4. OCLC 665133852.

=== Jesus liebt mich (2008) ===
The title translates to Jesus Loves Me. Marie has so far had little success in love and life. Now, however, she has met a handsome and caring man, albeit he has some strange ways. She soon finds out that her love interest is no one else but the Messiah himself, who has returned to earth in order to prepare humanity for Judgment Day. Only a few days remain until the end of the world.

- Safier, David (2010). Jesus liebt mich : Roman (in undetermined language). Reinbek bei Hamburg: Rowohlt-Taschenbuch-Verl. OCLC 770554771.

The novel was turned into a movie Jesus Loves Me starring Jessica Schwarz and Florian David Fitz in 2012.

=== Muh! (2012) ===
Muh! (Moo!) tells the story of cow Lolle. After her bull has just cheated on her with another cow, she meets an Italian tomcat, from whom she learns that the farmer is planning to have his cattle slaughtered. Following his advice, Lolle and her friends set off for India, where cows are sacred, in the hope for a better life.

- Safier, David (2021). Muh ! : Roman (in German). Reinbeck bei Hamburg: Rowohlt Taschenbuch Verlag. ISBN 978-3-499-25626-4. OCLC 1319459411.

=== 28 Tage lang (2014) ===
28 Tage lang (For 28 Days) recounts the everyday life of a Jewish girl in Warsaw Ghetto. Safier dedicated it to his grandparents, as his grandmother died in Łódż Ghetto.

The novel won an award for youth literature, the Buxtehude Bull, in 2014.

- Safier, David (2023). 28 Tage lang Roman (in German). Reinbek bei Hamburg: Rotfuchs. ISBN 978-3-499-21176-8. OCLC 1416890086.

=== Mieses Karma hoch 2 (2015) ===
In Mieses Karma hoch 2 (Bad Karma to the Power of Two), aspiring actress Daisy Becker is hoping for her breakthrough, despite being neither talented nor ambitious. She slacks off, drinks and occasionally steals from her flatmates. Her agent ultimately offers her a role in a new James Bond film starring Marc Barton, an arrogant Hollywood star. Through a series of events the two die in a car crash and, having gathered a lot of bad karma in their lives, are reborn as ants. Now they have to collect good karma in order to break through the cycle of death and rebirth. At the same time, they try to prevent Daisy’s friend (who has long-held feelings for her but never acted upon them) and Marc’s widow from becoming a couple, and slowly overcome their mutual animosities.

The novel was awarded the LovelyBooks prize in the Humor category.

- Safier, David (2017). Mieses Karma hoch 2 : Roman (in German). Reinbek bei Hamburg: Rowohlt Taschenbuch Verlag. ISBN 978-3-499-25814-5. OCLC 1030362330.

=== Other Novels ===
- Plötzlich Shakespeare (Suddenly Shakespeare), 2010
- Happy Family, 2011
- Traumprinz (Fairy Prince), 2016
- Miss Merkel – Mord in der Uckermark (Miss Merkel – Murder at the Castle), 2021
- Miss Merkel – Mord auf dem Friedhof (Miss Merkel – A Murder in the Graveyard), 2022

Happy Family was turned into an animated cartoon in 2017. It played in 92 countries and became an international critical and economic failure. Among the voice actors are Jason Isaacs, Emily Watson and Nick Frost.

Miss Merkel was turned into a TV film series in 2023. The English language version of the first Miss Merkel book was published by Old Street Publishing in November 2024 and translated by Jamie Bulloch.
