= Blood Red Sky =

2021 horror film

- Official release poster
- Directed by: Peter Thorwarth
- Written by: Peter Thorwarth; Stefan Holtz
- Produced by: Christian Becker; Benjamin Munz
- Starring: Peri Baumeister; Roland Møller; Chidi Ajufo; Alexander Scheer; Dominic Purcell
- Cinematography: Yoshi Heimrath
- Edited by: Knut Hake
- Music by: Dascha Dauenhauer
- Production company: Rat Pack Filmproduktion
- Distributed by: Netflix
- Release date: 23 July 2021
- Running time: 121 minutes
- Countries: United Kingdom; Germany
- Languages: English; German; Arabic
- Budget: $17.7 million

Blood Red Sky (also known as Transatlantic 473) is a 2021 British-German science fiction action horror film directed by Peter Thorwarth, who co-wrote the screenplay with Stefan Holtz. The film stars Peri Baumeister, Roland Møller, Chidi Ajufo, Alexander Scheer and Dominic Purcell. It was released on 23 July 2021 by Netflix.

It received positive reviews. In 2025, IndieWire placed it among their list of "the 25 Scariest Movies on Netflix."

== Plot ==
A German widow, Nadja, and her son Elias prepare to board a plane to New York; Nadja, who appears to suffer from leukemia, plans to visit a doctor for treatment. At the airport, Elias befriends a man named Farid, while his mother takes medicine that causes her severe discomfort.

As the passengers settle down for the evening, a group of men, including the co-pilot Bastian, murder the sky marshals and sabotage the black box, preventing the plane from being tracked on radar. Their leader, Berg, announces that he and his men are now in control and expect everyone to stay put until a ransom is paid. Elias tries to hide, and Nadja follows him. A sociopathic hijacker named Eightball sees them and shoots Nadja. Assuming she is dead, the hijackers force Farid to record a statement that makes it appear the plane has been seized by for a suicide attack, knowing it will be shot down.

As Nadja regains consciousness, she relives the day her husband, Nikolai, died. He had gone to a local farmhouse for help after their car broke down. When he failed to return, Nadja went looking for him and was bitten by his murderer, a vampire who dies during sunrise. Nadja, now a vampire, returned to the farmhouse looking for answers. An elderly vampire attacked her for killing his son and to avoid the spread of "the evil", but she beat him to death and escaped with vials of vampire suppressant.

Nadja accesses the cargo hold, removes the contacts and dentures that conceal her mutated eyes and fangs, and feeds on a dog. A hijacker catches her in the act, and she kills him and drinks his blood, which fully transforms her into a vampire. She finds Farid, and they regain control of the plane with the help of a student named Mohammed as the hijackers are about to parachute out. Mohammed returns them to their original flightplan. When Berg tries to take back control of the cockpit, Nadja surprises and bites him. She stabs him with a knife before he can fully transform.

The hijackers task Eightball with killing Nadja. He subdues her with UV light and extracts her blood, but as he is about to stake her, Elias accidentally depressurizes the plane with Berg's gun. When Mohammed asphyxiates, the hijackers take back the cockpit and decrease the plane's altitude, restoring the pressure. Eightball flees into the cargo hold and injects himself with Nadja's blood; she fails to kill him before he transforms into a vampire. Eightball ambushes and kills the other hijackers, except for Bastian. The rest of the passengers arm themselves. Nadja convinces them that she wants to help, and they lock Eightball in the hold and secure the plane.

Bastian informs Nadja that the plane does not have enough fuel to reach New York, and they must land soon. A dying passenger releases Eightball in the hopes of being bitten; instead, Eightball kills him and proceeds to turn most of the other passengers into vampires. Nadja, knowing that they will escape if the plane lands, decides to sacrifice herself by using the hijackers' explosives to kill them. Elias stops her and goes himself, but he is surrounded by vampires after grabbing the detonator. Nadja makes Farid promise to look after Elias, then kills and feeds on Bastian. She tries to save her son, but Eightball attacks her and drains her blood. As he goes for Elias, Farid steers the plane into the path of the morning sun, causing Eightball to burn and fall to his death.

Elias uses his blood to save Nadja's life, but she rejects him and flees, knowing that her taste for his blood puts him in danger. The plane lands at an RAF base in Scotland, but the authorities ignore Elias and Farid's pleas and board the plane looking for survivors, resulting in a massacre to the soldiers. Elias escapes from an ambulance and runs back to the plane, seeing his mother feeding on a soldier. Knowing that she is too far gone, he activates the detonator he hid in his teddy bear, seemingly killing her and the other vampires. Farid is released from custody and hugs Elias.

== Cast ==
- Peri Baumeister as Nadja
- Alexander Scheer as Eightball
- Kais Setti as Farid
- Carl Koch as Elias
- Gordon Brown as Bill Morris
- Roland Møller as Karl
- Chidi Ajufo as Curtiz
- Kai Ivo Baulitz as Bastian Buchner
- Graham McTavish as Col. Alan Drummond
- Dominic Purcell as Berg
- Leonie Brill as Julia
- Rainer Reiners as Rainer Huber
- Ilona Schulz as Ingelore Huber

== Production ==
On 11 September 2020, it was announced that filming in Prague for the film, then known as Transatlantic 473, was temporarily closed after an extra tested positive for COVID-19.

== Release ==
Blood Red Sky was released on 23 July 2021 by Netflix. It is one of the 71 original films that Netflix would release in 2021, being part of a strategy that intends to release at least one new film every week.

== Reception ==
=== Critical response ===
On review aggregator website Rotten Tomatoes, the film holds an approval rating of 81% based on 32 reviews, with an average rating of 6.5/10. The website's critics consensus reads, "Blood Red Sky makes the most of its high-concept vampire story, delivering a fast-paced treat for genre enthusiasts." The audience consensus reads, "Blood Red Sky has a great idea for a horror movie, even if it's quite a bit slower than its cool setup might suggest." On Metacritic, the film has a weighted average score of 43 out of 100, based on six critics, indicating "mixed or average reviews". The film ranks on Rotten Tomatoes' Best Horror Movies of 2021.

IndieWire, placing it among their list of "the 25 Scariest Movies on Netflix," writes that the movie "gets more mileage out of its 'vampires on a plane' story than it had any right to. While the German hijacking thriller may never get as gory as its wild logline suggests, it makes up for it with enough psychological drama to make for a highly entertaining viewing. While the idea sounds like pure camp, it takes itself more seriously than one might think and delivers some real scares in the process."

=== Audience viewership ===
Netflix reported the film was watched by 50 million subscribers over its first four weeks of release, making it the most successful German original title to date.

== Possible sequel ==
Due to the success of Blood Red Sky, a sequel reportedly began development by Netflix a few months after the first film was released. Thorwath declined the offer to direct the sequel, stating "I’m [...] looking for the next challenge." Further details such as the plot and casting are yet to be confirmed.
