= Dresden (2006 film) =

2006 German television film

- Genre: War, Drama, Romance
- Written by: Stefan Kolditz; Nikolaus Kraemer (idea)
- Directed by: Roland Suso Richter
- Starring: Felicitas Woll; John Light; Benjamin Sadler
- Composers: Harald Kloser; Thomas Wanker
- Country of origin: Germany
- Original languages: German; English

Production
- Producers: Nico Hofmann; Nikolaus Kraemer; Sascha Schwingel
- Cinematography: Holly Fink
- Editor: Bernd Schlegel
- Running time: 176 minutes / 145 minutes (theatrical release)
- Budget: €10,000,000 (estimated)

Original release
- Network: ZDF
- Release: 5 March 2006

Dresden is a 2006 German television film directed by Roland Suso Richter. It is set during the bombing of Dresden in World War II.

This romance movie takes place during the historical Anglo-American bombing of the city of Dresden in February 1945. It was produced by the ZDF, a German Public Television Programme, and was originally split in two parts of 90 minutes each. A cinema version was then released in 2010.

The film was inspired by Jörg Friedrich's book The Fire. The €10 million production was shot on original locations in Dresden and Chemnitz.

== Plot ==
Anna (Felicitas Woll), daughter of a wealthy hospital director, works as a nurse along with her father and her future husband, Doctor Alexander (Benjamin Sadler). Whilst behind enemy lines, British pilot Robert Newman (John Light) is severely wounded and hides in the hospital's cellar. Anna finds him and cures his wounds, slowly falling in love with him.

The story takes place before and during the bombing of Dresden (13 February 1945) and it follows the characters through 3 days in the city.

== Cast ==
- Felicitas Woll as Anna Mauth
- John Light as Robert Newman
- Benjamin Sadler as Alexander Wenninger
- Heiner Lauterbach as Carl Mauth
- Katharina Meinecke as Magda Mauth
- Marie Bäumer as Maria Goldberg
- Kai Wiesinger as Simon Goldberg
- Wolfgang Stumph as Pfarrer
- Jürgen Heinrich as Gauleiter Martin Mutschmann
- Susanne Bormann as Eva Mauth
- Paul Ready as William
