= Winners (2024 film) =

2024 German family film

- Theatrical release poster
- German: Sieger sein
- Directed by: Soleen Yusef
- Written by: Soleen Yusef
- Produced by: Sonja Schmitt; Marc Schmidheiny; Christoph Daniel
- Starring: Dileyla Agirman; Andreas Döhler
- Cinematography: Stephan Burchardt
- Edited by: Marty Schenk
- Music by: David Menke; Boris Rogowski
- Production companies: DCM Pictures; Boje Buck Produktion; MDR; SWR; WDR
- Distributed by: DCM Film Distribution
- Release dates: 16 February 2024 (Berlinale); 11 April 2024 (Germany)
- Running time: 119 minutes
- Country: Germany
- Languages: German; Kurdish

Winners (German: Sieger sein) is a 2024 German family drama film written and directed by Soleen Yusef. The film tells the story of eleven-year-old Kurdish girl Mona, a Syrian refugee, who goes to a school in Wedding in Berlin. She can only speak bad German, but play good football.

It was selected as the opening film of the Generation Kplus section at the 74th Berlin International Film Festival, and had its World premiere on 16 February. It is also competing for Crystal Bear for the Best Film.

== Synopsis ==
Mona is eleven years old and belongs to a Kurdish family of seven who escaped from Syria to Berlin. They live in Wedding (Berlin), a place where most of the kids in her new school are from other countries. The school is a mess. The teachers are losing their minds and the students are getting more and more angry every day. Mona feels the same way. She doesn't know much German, but she knows how to play football. She used to play with her friends on the streets of her old city. She misses her home, her friends and especially her aunt Helin. Her aunt was the one who always encouraged Mona to follow her football dreams. But Germany is nothing like her home. Then Mr Che, a caring teacher, sees how good Mona is at football and picks her for the girls' team. But that doesn't make things any better. Mona is seen as an outsider and it's hard to get along with the other girls on the team. They all have their own problems but they soon realize that they can only win if they work as a team.

== Cast ==
- Dileyla Agirman as Mona
- Andreas Döhler as Herr Che
- Sherine Ciara Merai as Jasmin
- Tamira Bwibo as Terry
- Halima Ilter as Nada Sabri
- Hêvîn Tekin as Aunt Helin
- Peri Baumeister as Ms Abbel
- Alireza Ahmadi as Jagar
- Carina Wiese as Ms Burchardt
- Fatima Hamieh as Aysel
- Samira Hamieh as Ayla
- Heidi Tebroke as Gina
- Yumin Hannah Cho as Thi-Le
- Carlotta Su Ipsen as Nadine
- Artemis Kostopoulou as Funda
- Anisa Perk as Rania
- Rankin Duffy as Harry
- Manasse Kiefer as Hussein
- Matteo Mermer as Vedat
- Dominic John Brandl as Food
- Ceci Chuh as Commentator

== Production ==
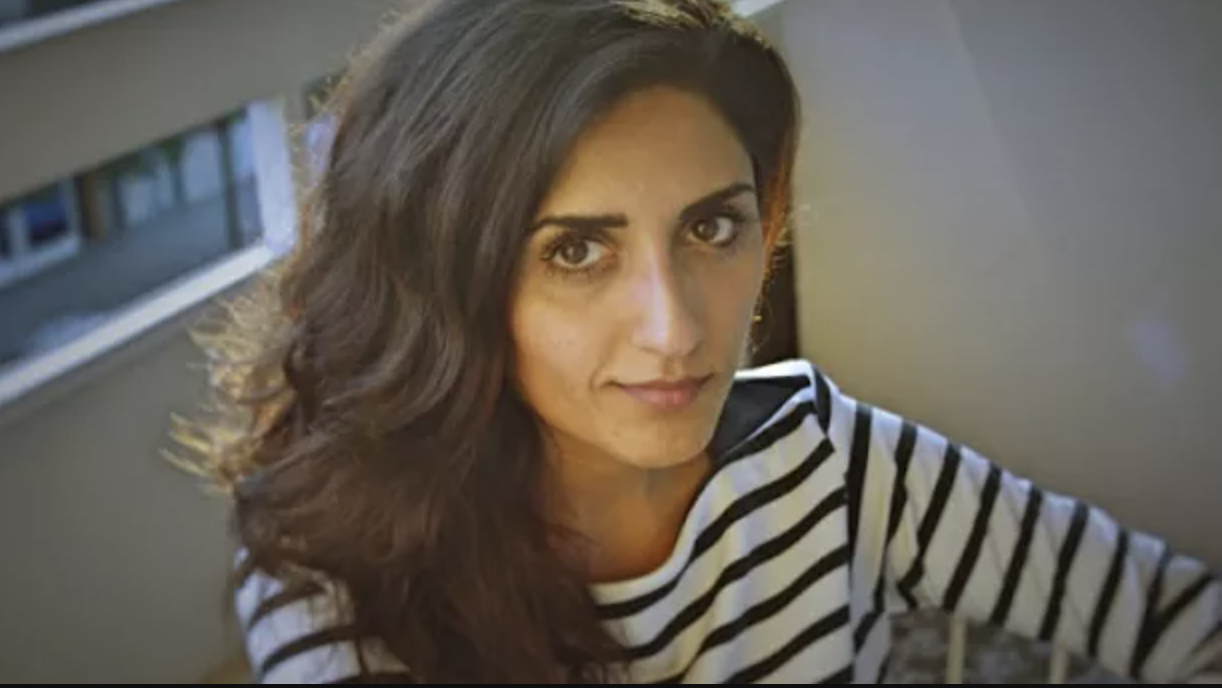
Director Soleen Yusef

Winners is the 11th film as part of 'The Special Children's Film' initiative. the German-Kurdish director Soleen Yusef, together with young actresses, has created the film based on their own experiences. Music of the film was composed by David Menke and Boris Rogowski.

Filming took place from 13 March to 3 June 2023, in Berlin and Saxony-Anhalt, under director of photography Stephan Burchardt.

== Release ==
Winners had its World premiere on 16 February 2024, as part of the 74th Berlin International Film Festival, in Generation Kplus.

It was released in German theaters on 11 April 2024.

It also featured in the International Competition of Feature Films in the junior category on 30 May 2024 in the 64th edition of the Zlín Film Festival, also known as the International Film Festival for Children and Youth held in the Czech Republic.

== Reception ==
Verena Schmöller reviewing in Kino Zeit at Berlinale rated the film with four stars and wrote, "Winners is definitely refreshing, in its character constellation as well as its look." Schmöller praised the sound design and music, writing, "sound design and music with strong rhythms match the dialogues and the atmosphere, which are sometimes as harsh and aggressive as the conditions depicted at the Wedding elementary school."

== Accolades ==
| Award | Date | Category | Recipient | Result | Ref. |
|---|---|---|---|---|---|
| Berlin International Film Festival | 25 February 2024 | Generation Kplus Crystal Bear for Best Feature Film | Soleen Yusef | Nominated | |
| European Film Awards | 7 December 2024 | European Film Academy Young Audience Award | Winners | Nominated | |
| Luxembourg City Film Festival | 16 March 2025 | School Jury Award | Winners | Won | |
