= Russian Disco =

- Theatrical release poster
- Directed by: Oliver Ziegenbalg
- Written by: Oliver Ziegenbalg
- Produced by: Christoph Hahnheiser; Arthur Cohn
- Starring: Matthias Schweighöfer; Friedrich Mücke; Christian Friedel; Peri Baumeister
- Cinematography: Tetsuo Nagata
- Edited by: Peter R. Adam
- Music by: Lars Löhn
- Production companies: Black Forest Films; SevenPictures Film
- Distributed by: Paramount Pictures
- Release date: 29 March 2012
- Running time: 1h 40min
- Country: Germany
- Language: German

Russian Disco (German: Russendisko) is a 2012 German comedy film based on the eponymous novel by Wladimir Kaminer.

== Cast ==
- Matthias Schweighöfer - Wladimir Kaminer
- Friedrich Mücke - Mischa
- Christian Friedel - Andrej
- Peri Baumeister - Olga
- Susanne Bormann - Hanna
- Imogen Kogge - Frau Kaminer
- Rainer Bock - Herr Kaminer
- Pheline Roggan - Helena
- Jule Böwe - Jule
- Waldemar Kobus - Rabbi
- Rafael Gareisen - Wladimir als Teenager
