= Im Namen des Gesetzes =

German television series

- Genre: Police procedural; Legal drama
- Created by: Harald Vock
- Based on: Law & Order
- Starring: List of characters
- Composers: Rainer Oleak; Wilhelm Stegmeier
- Country of origin: Germany
- Original language: German
- No. of seasons: 16
- No. of episodes: 193

Production
- Executive producers: Christian Hannoschöck; Peter Jännert
- Producers: Michael Alexander; Torsten Götz; Melanie Brozeit; Thomas Justus; Jan-Richard Schuster; Alexander von Hohenthal
- Production location: Berlin
- Cinematography: Nicolai Kätsch; Thomas Plenert; Christoph Krauss; Stefan Motzek
- Editors: Claudia Klook; Kirstin Geller; Lars Späth
- Running time: 45 minutes

Original release
- Network: RTL
- Release: September 20, 1994 – October 30, 2008

Im Namen des Gesetzes (English: in the name of the law) is a German television series. It follows the work of Berlin based criminal police officers and public prosecutors.

== Plot ==
The series is based on the long-running U.S. television series Law & Order and uses a similar narrated intro and scene change titles.

=== Mistakes ===
The police officers and prosecutors act in the same way the detectives and district attorneys in Law & Order do, although they actually interact different in Germany. Especially the procedures in court are completely different as it is mainly the judge who questions the defendants and witnesses.

=== Intro ===
Much like Law & Order, every episode starts with a narrated intro.

Die folgende Geschichte beruht auf Tatsachen. Sie schildert die Zusammenarbeit zwischen Polizei und Staatsanwaltschaft bei der Bekämpfung von Straftaten. Die Staatsanwaltschaft beauftragt die Polizei mit der Aufklärung der Straftaten und klagt die Täter vor Gericht an. Polizei und Staatsanwaltschaft handeln im Namen des Gesetzes.

In English:

The following story is based on actual events. It tells of the co-operation between the criminal police and the prosecutor's office when combating criminality. The prosecutor's office orders the police to solve crimes and charges the offenders in court. Police officers and prosecutors act in the name of the law.

== Characters ==
The series follows two officers of the criminal police: one senior detective (German: Kriminalhauptkommissar) and one junior detective (German: Kriminaloberkommissar or Kriminalkommissar) as well as a senior and a junior prosecutor (German: Oberstaatsanwalt and Staatsanwalt). A medical examiner (German: Rechtsmediziner or Gerichtsmediziner) is also frequently featured.

In contrast to most other police procedurals in German television, the audience learns nothing personal about any of the characters. Neither do they express personal feelings or emotions as it is frequently shown in Law & Order.

While the senior detective remained the same over the course of the series, the junior one changed multiple times. The prosecutors stayed the same for the first 10 years but afterwards, they changed multiple times as well.

Character name	Portrayed by	Position	English translation	Years
Law (detectives, medical examiners & forensic scientists)
Stefan Kehler	Wolfgang Bathke	Kriminalhauptkommissar	Principal Detective	1994-2008
Mark Eschenbach	Matthias Bullach	Kriminaloberkommissar	Senior Detective	1994–1996
Peter Wolniak	Uwe Fellensiek	Kriminalkommissar	Detective	1996-1998
Ralf Bongartz	Max Gertsch	Kriminalkommissar	Detective	1998-2000
Axel Bonhoff	Wolfgang Krewe	Kriminalkommissar	Detective	2000-2008
Dr. Duhler	Klaus Schindler	Gerichtsmediziner	Medical Examiner	1998-2008
Svenja Björson	Li Hagman	Kriminaltechnikerin	Forensic Scientist	2005-2008
Order (prosecutors, judges and advocates)
Dr. Gerhard Lotze	Henry van Lyck	Oberstaatsanwalt	Senior Prosecutor	1994-2004
Dr. Steiner	Wolf-Dietrich Berg	Oberstaatsanwalt	Senior Prosecutor	1998
Dr. Max Brunner	Michael Fitz	Oberstaatsanwalt	Senior Prosecutor	2004-2005
Dr. Tobias Kampen	Axel Pape	Oberstaatsanwalt	Senior Prosecutor	2005-2008
Karin Kerstin	Magdalena Ritter	Staatsanwältin	Prosecutor	1994
Charlotte Glaser	Britta Schmeling	Staatsanwältin	Prosecutor	1994-2005
Susanne Clausen	Brigitte Beyeler	Staatsanwältin	Prosecutor	1999-2002
Lisa Sturm	Mariella Ahrens	Staatsanwältin	Prosecutor	2005-2008
Eva Hardenberg	Sandra Borgmann	Staatsanwältin	Prosecutor	2008
	Annekathrin Bürger	Vorsitzende Richterin	Presiding Judge	1998-2004
	Walter Tschernich	Vorsitzender Richter	Presiding Judge	1998-2004
	Bodo Wolf	Vorsitzender Richter	Presiding Judge	1998-2007
	Hans Peter Hallwachs	Vorsitzender Richter	Presiding Judge	2000-2008
	Norbert Ghafouri	Vorsitzender Richter	Presiding Judge	2002-2008
	Heidrun Gärtner	Richterin	Judge	2003-2008
Gotthardy	Angela Hobrig	Haftrichterin	Custodial Judge	2000-2002
Siegfrid Rasch	Karl-Heinz von Liebezeit	Rechtsanwalt	Advocate	2000-2007
