= Udo Samel =

German actor

- Born: 25 June 1953 (age 72); Trier-Eitelsbach, West Germany
- Occupation: Actor
- Years active: 1977–present

Udo Samel (born 25 June 1953) is a German actor. He has appeared in more than 80 films and television shows since 1977. He starred in the 1994 film Back to Square One, which was entered into the 44th Berlin International Film Festival.

== Selected filmography ==
- Knife in the Head (1978)
- Class Enemy (1983)
- The Death of the White Stallion (1985)
- Mit meinen heißen Tränen (1986, TV film)
- The Case of Mr. Spalt (1988)
- The Seventh Continent (1989)
- Winckelmann's Travels (1990)
- Ende der Unschuld (1991, TV film)
- The Movie Teller (1993)
- 71 Fragments of a Chronology of Chance (1994)
- Back to Square One (1994)
- Killer Condom (1996)
- In the Name of Innocence (1997, TV film)
- The Piano Teacher (2001) - Dr. George Blonskij
- Alles auf Zucker! (2004)
- The Call of the Toad (2005)
- The Witness House (2014, TV film)
- Goodbye Berlin (2016)
- Artur Schnabel: No Place of Exile (2017)
- The Awakening of Motti Wolkenbruch (2018)
- Babylon Berlin (2018, TV series)
- The Story of My Wife (2021)
- No Hit Wonder (2025)

== Awards ==
- 1977: Förderpreis für Literatur der Landeshauptstadt Düsseldorf in Northrhine-Westphalia
- 1987: German Actors Award (Chaplin Shoe)
- 1987: 23.Adolf Grimme Preis (with Gold)
- 1988: European Film Award - Barcelona (best main actor)
- 1994: Bayerischer Fernsehpreis (TV Award) for "Max Salomon" in "Durchreise"
