= How About Adolf? =

2018 film

- Directed by: Sönke Wortmann
- Starring: Christoph Maria Herbst; Florian David Fitz
- Distributed by: Constantin Film
- Release date: 6 October 2018 (ZFF)
- Running time: 91 minutes
- Country: Germany
- Language: German

How About Adolf? (German: Der Vorname) is a 2018 German comedy film based on the French film What's in a Name?.

== Plot ==
A provocative question at a dinner party leads to a barrage of reproaches and insults.

== Cast ==
- Christoph Maria Herbst - Stephan Berger
- Florian David Fitz - Thomas Böttcher
- Caroline Peters - Elisabeth Berger-Böttcher
- Justus von Dohnányi - René König
- Janina Uhse - Anna Böttcher
- Iris Berben - Dorothea Böttcher
