= Jesus Loves Me (film) =

2012 German romantic comedy film

- Theatrical release poster
- Directed by: Florian David Fitz
- Written by: Florian David Fitz
- Based on: Jesus liebt mich by David Safier
- Produced by: Nico Hofmann; Steffi Ackermann; Thomas Peter Friedl; Patrick Zorer
- Starring: Jessica Schwarz; Florian David Fitz
- Cinematography: Stefan Unterberger
- Edited by: Mona Bräuer
- Music by: Marcel Barsotti
- Production companies: UFA Cinema; ZDF
- Distributed by: Warner Bros. Pictures
- Release date: 20 December 2012
- Running time: 100 minutes
- Country: Germany
- Language: German
- Box office: $7.1 million

Jesus Loves Me (German: Jesus liebt mich) is a 2012 German romantic comedy film written, directed and starring Florian David Fitz, based on the 2008 novel Jesus liebt mich by David Safier.

== Cast ==
- Jessica Schwarz as Marie
- Florian David Fitz as Jeshua/Jesus
- Henry Hübchen as Gabriel
- Hannelore Elsner as Silvia
- Nicholas Ofczarek as Satan
- Peter Prager as Werner
- Palina Rojinski as Svetlana
- Marc Benjamin Puch as Sven
- Michael Gwisdek as Gott
- Johannes Allmayer as Kellner
- Christine Schorn as Alte
