= Rising High =

2020 German-language film

- Film poster
- Directed by: Cüneyt Kaya
- Written by: Cüneyt Kaya
- Starring: David Kross; Frederick Lau; Janina Uhse
- Distributed by: Netflix
- Release date: April 17, 2020
- Running time: 94 minutes
- Country: Germany
- Language: German

Rising High (Betonrausch) is a 2020 German comedy-drama film directed and written by Cüneyt Kaya. The plot revolves around Viktor (David Kross), Gerry (Frederick Lau) and Nicole (Janina Uhse), who have figured out a way to make money out of the property market in Berlin.

It was released on April 17, 2020, by Netflix.

== Plot ==
Netflix states the plot is, "Ready to do anything to get rich, a young man upends the Berlin property market with his shady pal, till the good times threaten to destroy it all."

== Cast ==
- David Kross as Viktor Steiner
- Frederick Lau as Gerry Falkland
- Janina Uhse as Nicole Kleber
- Anne Schäfer as Luna
- Sophia Thomalla as Chantal
- Dejan Bucin as Herr Thiel
- Uwe Preuss as Manfred Bauer
- Jerry Kwarteng as Gefängniswärter Topcu
- Silvina Buchbauer as Viktoria Steiner

=== English dubbing ===
The English version was produced by Igloo Music in Burbank, California. William Nedved adapted the script and Harry Buerkle directed the dub.

Role	Actor	Voice actor
Viktor Steiner	David Kross	David Haack
Gerry Falkland	Frederick Lau	Mitch Eakins
Nicole Kleber	Janina Uhse	Emily Goss
Chantal	Sophia Thomalla	Gia Bay
Viktoria Steiner	Silvina Buchbauer	Susan Angelo

== Release ==
Rising High was released on April 17, 2020, on Netflix.
