= No Hit Wonder =

2025 German comedy film

- Theatrical release poster
- Directed by: Florian Dietrich
- Written by: Florian David Fitz
- Produced by: Dan Maag; Daniel Sonnabend; Marco Beckmann
- Starring: Florian David Fitz; Nora Tschirner; Udo Samel; Jerusha Wahlen
- Cinematography: Max Preiss
- Edited by: Julia Karg
- Music by: John Gürtler; Jan Miserre
- Production companies: Pantaleon Films; Warner Bros. Film Productions Germany; Erfttal Film; Koryphäen Film; Magic Media Production
- Distributed by: Warner Bros. Pictures
- Release date: 30 October 2025
- Running time: 118 minutes
- Country: Germany
- Language: German
- Box office: $2.3 million

No Hit Wonder is a 2025 German comedy film directed by Florian Dietrich and written by and starring Florian David Fitz, along with Nora Tschirner, Udo Samel and Jerusha Wahlen.

The film was released in Germany on 30 October 2025 by Warner Bros. Pictures and received positive reviews.

== Plot ==
Years after his hit song “Time Time Time,” musician Daniel Nowak still struggles with being labeled a one-hit wonder. His former fame-stadium concerts and media attention-is long gone. To make a living, he now appears on reality shows and performs small gigs in furniture stores. After one such performance, he attempts suicide by shooting himself on his balcony, but the attempt fails. He falls from the railing and ends up in the closed ward of a psychiatric hospital in Munich with injuries.

At the clinic, Daniel initially refuses treatment and is further depressed when the press ignores his suicide attempt. Researcher Dr. Lissi Waldstett, who studies happiness, offers to help him leave the ward if he participates in her study in the adjacent day clinic. Her research examines whether group singing can help lonely, depressed people become happier. Daniel declines at first, but when a journalist offers him a major interview, he realizes joining the study is his only way out and agrees.

In Lissi’s group, Daniel meets several kind but eccentric outsiders. Using his musical talent, he helps improve the choir and motivates the participants. When the shy teenager Elaha finally opens up and leads the group in a powerful version of “Wrecking Ball,” a video of the rehearsal goes viral and the choir receives an invitation to a late-night TV show. Lissi considers the appearance irresponsible, but Daniel and the group overrule her.

During the TV recording, the choir member Helmut, who suffers from dementia, fails to appear. The group becomes insecure and the performance collapses. Elaha suddenly starts singing “Time Time Time,” forcing Daniel to join her. The audience celebrates their duet, while the rest of the choir receives little attention. At the after-show party, Daniel slips back into old habits, enjoying the renewed fame and drugs. After the broadcast, Elaha reads hateful comments online and threatens in a livestream to jump off a building, but the choir manages to stop her.

The next morning Daniel realizes he behaved wrongly. When he arrives at the rehearsal room, only Lissi is there. She reveals that her research was actually about Daniel himself, intended to lead to a follow-up study. Later, Daniel talks to Elaha, who has been admitted to the psychiatric ward, and convinces her to leave social media behind and reconcile with her father.

After the incident, Lissi quits her job at the clinic but agrees to Daniel’s suggestion that they get to know each other better, as they had already grown closer. Meanwhile, Helmut, now living in a nursing home, is surprised by the choir with a performance of “Come On Eileen.”

== Cast ==
- Florian David Fitz as Daniel
- Nora Tschirner as Lissi
- Udo Samel as Helmut
- Jerusha Wahlen as Elaha
- Corinna Kirchhoff as Ellen
- Jasmin Shakeri as Sandra
- Holger Stockhaus as Stefan
- Aziz Dyab as Sami
- Lorna Ishema as Dr. Hazel Graminski
- Bibiana Beglau as Klinikchefin
- Sebastian Blomberg as Moderator
