= Peri Baumeister =

German actress

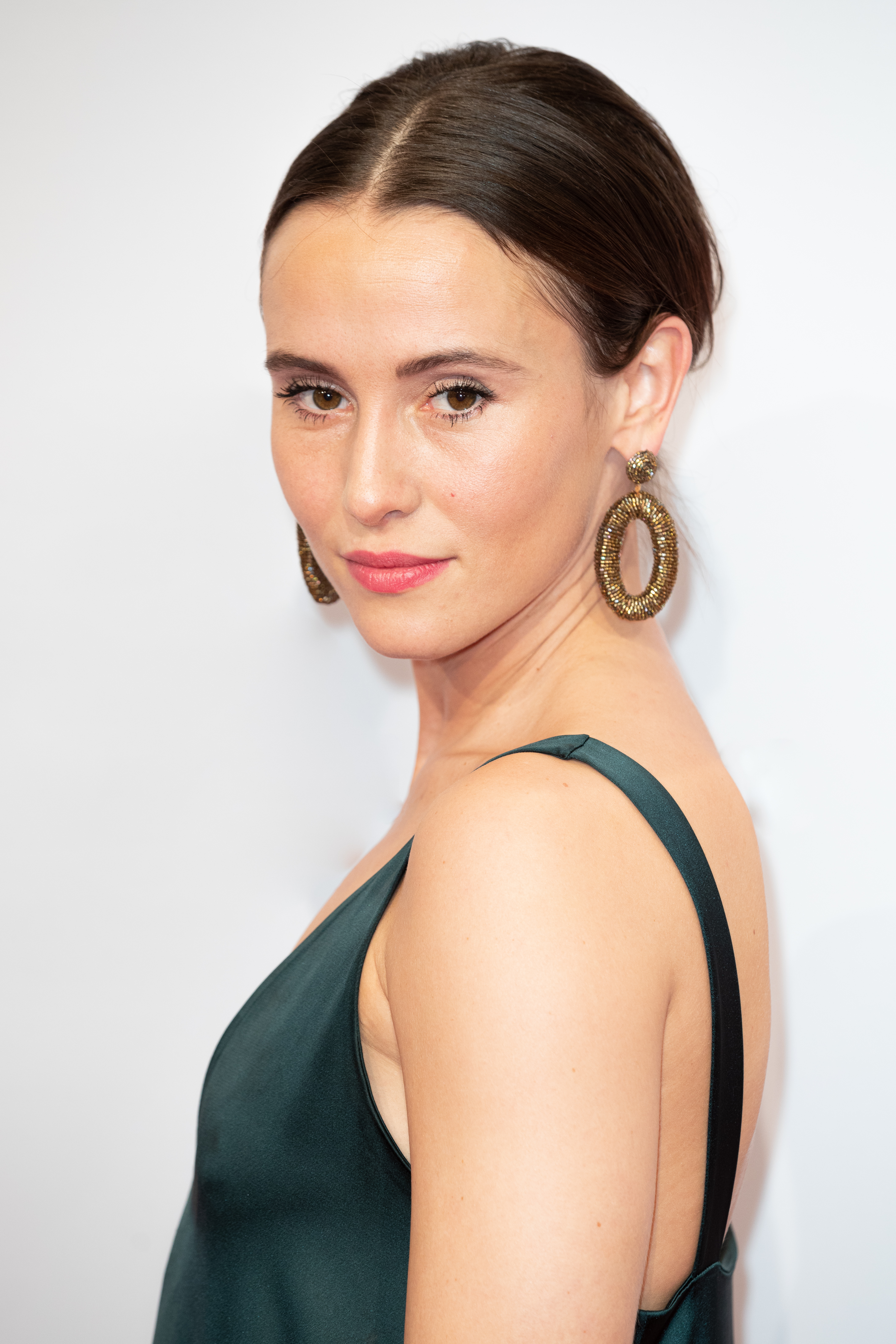
- Peri Baumeister, 2019
- Born: 1986 (age 39–40); West Berlin, West Germany
- Occupation: Actress
- Years active: 2006–present
- Relatives: Muriel Baumeister (half-sister)

Peri Baumeister (born 1986) is a German TV and film actress best known in the UK for her role as Lady Gisela in series two and three of The Last Kingdom (2018) and as Sara in the 2019 Netflix television series Skylines and the vampire plane horror movie Blood Red Sky in 2021.

== Career ==
Peri Baumeister is the daughter of the actor Edwin Noel-Baumeister and the cultural manager Judith Schäfer-Schuller. Her older half-sister Muriel Baumeister is also an actress. From 2007 to 2011, Peri Baumeister studied acting at the August Everding Prinzregententheater (Bavarian Theatre Academy) in Munich. During this time she appeared in stage productions of Lars von Trier's Dogville and Manderlay under the direction of Jochen Schölch at the Metropol-Theater (Munich). In her third year of study she received the leading role of Grete Trakl in the movie Tabu – It is the Soul of a Stranger on Earth at the side of Lars Eidinger. It was her cinematic debut, and she was awarded the prize for Best Young Actress at the Max Ophüls Film Festival in 2012. Baumeister then starred in Oliver Ziegenbalg's bestselling film Russian Disco. For her role in the social drama A Faithful Husband directed by Hermine Huntgeburth, she was nominated Best Supporting Actress at the German Academy of Television Awards. In the Norwegian TV six-parter The Heavy Water War about Hitler's attempts to develop an atomic bomb, she played the wife of physicist Werner Heisenberg.

In 2017, Baumeister made the switch to English-speaking audiences, starring in series two and three of The Last Kingdom as Lady Gisela, following this in 2019 with a regular main role in the Netflix television series Skylines as Sara.

In 2021, Baumeister played the protagonist in the Peter Thorwarth directed Netflix vampire horror film Blood Red Sky.

== Filmography ==
=== Film ===
Year	Title	Role	Notes
2011	Tabu: The Soul Is a Stranger on Earth	Grete / Sister	
2012	Russian Disco	Olga	
2013	Wetlands	Schwester Valerie	
2014	Irre sind männlich (en.Therapy Crashers)	Bernadette	
2014	A Faithful Husband	Nina	TV film
2016	Unsere Zeit ist jetzt (English: Our Time is Now)	Vanessa	
2018	Mack the Knife: Brecht's Threepenny Film	Elisabeth Hauptmann	
2019	Péitruss	Lara	Luxembourgish–Dutch co-production
2021	Blood Red Sky	Nadja	British–German co-production
2024	Winners	Miss Abbel	

=== Television ===
Year	Title	Role	Notes
2012	Tatort	Roswitha Kranz	Episode: "Borowski und der stille Gast"
2015	The Heavy Water War	Elisabeth Heisenberg	Main cast (miniseries)
2015	Der Kriminalist	Carolin Naters	Episode: "Treu bis in den Tod"
2015	Blochin: Die Lebenden und die Toten (The Living and the Dead)	Freddy Geissler	Episode: "2. Kapitel"
2016	Ein starkes Team	Nathalie Brombach	Episode: "Nathalie"
2016	Die Chefin	Jessica Kempf	Episode: "Abrechnung"
2017–2018	The Last Kingdom	Lady Gisela	Main cast (Season 2–3)
2019	Skylines	Sara	6 episodes
2022	Neuland	Marie Klein	6 episodes
2023	Schlafende Hunde	Lenni Atlas	6 episodes
2024	The Signal	Paula	4 episodes

== Awards and nominations ==
Year	Category	Award	Film	Result
2014	Best Supporting Actress	German Television Academy Award	A Faithful Husband	Nominated
2015	Best German Actress	Award	Therapy Crashers	Nominated

== External ==
- Peri Baumeister at IMDb
- Gisela – Peri Baumeister
