= Lutter (TV series) =

- Starring: Joachim Król
- Country of origin: Germany

Lutter is a German television series starring Joachim Król.

== Casts ==
- Joachim Król: Kriminalhauptkommissar Lutter
- Lucas Gregorowicz: Kriminaloberkommissar Michael Bergmann
- Matthias Koeberlin: Kriminaloberkommissar Michael Engels
- Sascha Laura Soydan: Staatsanwältin Jale Deniz
- Sandra Borgmann: Pathologin Sina Kaschinski
- Jochen Nickel: Sunny Schwecke
- Timo Dierkes: Höcki

== See also ==
- List of German television series
