= Wladimir Kaminer =

Russian-German writer and columnist

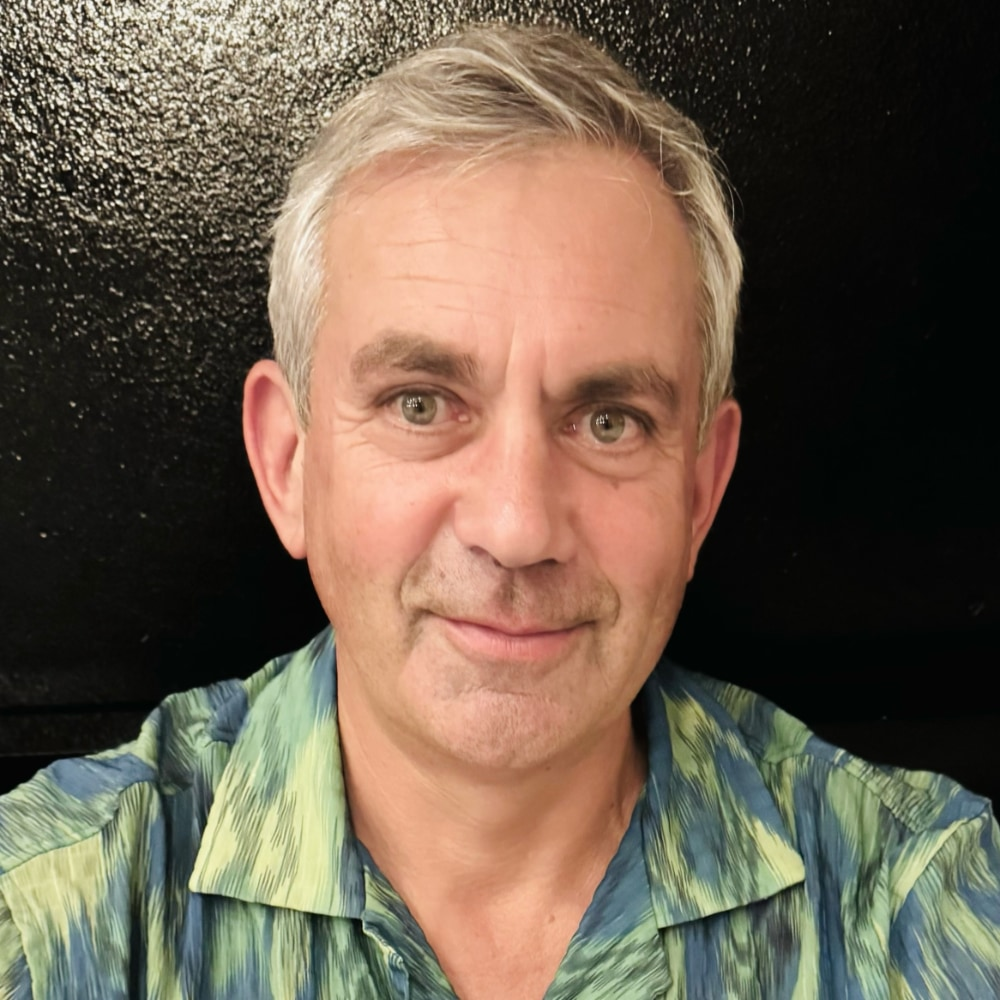
- Kaminer in 2025
- Born: 19 July 1967 (age 59); Moscow, Russian SFSR, Soviet Union
- Citizenship: Russian, German
- Education: Russian Institute of Theatre Arts
- Occupations: Writer, columnist
- Writing career
- Notable works: Russendisko; Militärmusik

Wladimir Wiktorowitsch Kaminer (Russian: Владимир Викторович Каминер, romanized: Vladímir Víktorovich Kamíner; born 19 July 1967 in Moscow, Russian SFSR, Soviet Union) is a Russian-German writer and columnist. He writes his texts not in his native language, but in German.

His collection of stories Russendisko, whose first publication marks its 25th anniversary in 2025, made him one of the most popular authors in Germany. Militärmusik (Military Music) and other works also made him known outside of Germany. The total circulation of his books and audiobooks amounts to 6.4 million copies sold. Of these, 1.8 million copies are for Russendisko (as of August 2025).

== Life ==
Kaminer is the son of a lecturer in strength of materials and a business economist who worked as a deputy manager in a company of the Soviet inland fleet. Kaminer was a Soviet citizen of Jewish descent and is today a German citizen.

From 1986 to 1988, Kaminer served his military service in a missile position near Moscow. After training as an audio engineer for theatre and radio, he studied dramaturgy at the Moscow Institute of Theatre. During his studies, he earned a living with odd jobs and by organizing parties and underground concerts in the Moscow rock scene.

In June 1990, Kaminer received humanitarian asylum in the German Democratic Republic (GDR). Even before the German reunification on 3 October, he was granted East German citizenship, which made him a German citizen under Federal German law. However, he himself reported living for many years with a travel document for aliens (Fremdenpass).

== Work ==
Kaminer's works are characterized by a humorous, trenchant, and observant style. He achieved his literary breakthrough in 2000 with the story collection Russendisko. From the perspective of an immigrant, he describes the absurdities of German everyday life and addresses cultural differences and similarities.

In Militärmusik (2001), Kaminer recounted, partly autobiographically, his hair-raising adventures in the Soviet Army during the time of Gorbachev. The book solidified his reputation as a humorous chronicler of Soviet everyday life and the absurd life in the declining socialist system.

An important place for the development of his literary work was the Berlin reading stage Reformbühne Heim & Welt, where he tested his stories weekly in front of an audience. In addition to his numerous book publications, Kaminer regularly writes columns and texts for various newspapers and magazines, including the monthly column "Kaminer's Kino" for the cinema magazine epd Film.

In addition to his writing, Kaminer is a fixture in German cultural life and a regular guest on television. He had a weekly show called Wladimirs Welt on Radio Multikulti of the SFB and a segment on ZDF-Morgenmagazin. Since 2018, Kaminer Inside has been broadcast on the cultural channel 3sat. In it, Kaminer visits special places and people in Germany, Austria, and Switzerland and asks about the meaning of "Heimat" (home).

Together with the musician Yuriy Gurzhy, he organized the event series Russendisko (Russian Disco). After the start of the Russian invasion of Ukraine, the series was renamed Ukrainska Diska (Ukrainian Disco) in solidarity and continues to take place.

Kaminer is a co-founder of the writers' association PEN Berlin.

== Positions ==
Wladimir Kaminer sees himself as a bridge-builder between cultures. Since the Russian invasion of Ukraine in 2022, he has increasingly positioned himself as a critical commentator on Russian politics. He sharply condemns the war of aggression, shows solidarity with Ukraine, and expresses nuanced views on Russian society in interviews and talk shows. He emphasizes that the actions of the Kremlin are not synonymous with the will of all Russians and feels a co-responsibility to correct the image of Russia in Germany, which he himself helped to shape.

== Awards ==
- 2002: Ben Witter Prize
- 2005: Stahl-Literature Prize (Stahl-Literaturpreis der Stahlstiftung Eisenhüttenstadt)
- 2010: Picture Book of the Month April 2010 for Das Leben ist kein Joghurt
- 2012: Berliner Bär (B.Z. Culture Prize)
- 2020: Honorary Artist of the König Albert Theater Bad Elster

== Personal life ==
Kaminer is married to the author Olga Kaminer (née Gura), also from Russia, whom he met in Berlin in 1995. The couple has two adult children and lives in Berlin-Prenzlauer Berg.

== Bibliography (Selection) ==
- Russendisko. Goldmann, Munich 2000, ISBN 3-442-54519-6.
- Schönhauser Allee. Goldmann, Munich 2001, ISBN 3-442-54559-5.
- Militärmusik. Goldmann, Munich 2001, ISBN 3-442-54532-3.
- Die Reise nach Trulala. Goldmann, Munich 2002, ISBN 3-442-54542-0.
- Mein deutsches Dschungelbuch. Goldmann, Munich 2003, ISBN 3-442-54554-4.
- Ich mache mir Sorgen, Mama. Goldmann, Munich 2004, ISBN 3-442-54560-9.
- with Olga Kaminer: Küche totalitär. Das Kochbuch des Sozialismus. Goldmann, Munich 2007, ISBN 978-3-442-54610-7.
- Ich bin kein Berliner. Ein Reiseführer für faule Touristen. Goldmann, Munich 2007, ISBN 978-3-442-54240-6.
- Mein Leben im Schrebergarten. Goldmann, Munich 2007, ISBN 978-3-442-54618-3.
- Es gab keinen Sex im Sozialismus. Legenden und Missverständnisse des vorigen Jahrhunderts. Goldmann, Munich 2009, ISBN 978-3-442-54265-9.
- Meine kaukasische Schwiegermutter. Goldmann, Munich 2010, ISBN 978-3-442-54656-5.
- Goodbye, Moskau. Betrachtungen über Russland. Goldmann, Munich 2017, ISBN 978-3-442-15916-1.
- Frühstück am Rande der Apokalypse. Wunderraum, Munich 2023, ISBN 978-3-442-31711-0.
- Das geheime Leben der Deutschen. Wunderraum, Munich 2025, ISBN 978-3-442-31785-1.

== Discography (Selection) ==
- Russendisko. Random House Audio, ISBN 3-89830-135-4, 2000.
- Militärmusik. Random House Audio, ISBN 3-89830-263-6, 2001.
- Schönhauser Allee. Random House Audio, ISBN 3-89830-354-3, 2002.
- Die Reise nach Trulala. Random House Audio, ISBN 3-89830-414-0, 2002.
- Mein deutsches Dschungelbuch. Random House Audio, ISBN 3-89830-610-0, 2003.
- Ich mache mir Sorgen, Mama. Random House Audio, ISBN 3-89830-773-5, 2004.
- Karaoke. Random House Audio, ISBN 3-86604-014-8, 2005.
- Küche totalitär. Random House Audio, ISBN 3-86604-114-4, 2006.
- Ich bin kein Berliner. Random House Audio, ISBN 978-3-86604-492-0, 2007.
- Mein Leben im Schrebergarten. Random House Audio, ISBN 978-3-86604-670-2, 2007.
- Es gab keinen Sex im Sozialismus. Random House Audio, ISBN 978-3-8371-0027-3, 2009.
- Meine kaukasische Schwiegermutter. Random House Audio, ISBN 978-3-8371-0400-4, 2010.
- Coole Eltern leben länger. Random House Audio, ISBN 978-3-8371-2656-3, 2014.
