= Skylines (TV series) =

German television drama series

- Genre: Drama
- Created by: Dennis Schanz
- Directed by: Maximilan Erlenwein; Soleen Yusef
- Starring: Edin Hasanović; Murathan Muslu; Peri Baumeister; Sahin Eryilmaz; Erdal Yıldız
- Country of origin: Germany
- Original language: German
- No. of seasons: 1
- No. of episodes: 6

Production
- Editor: Akın Özçelik
- Running time: 47–66 minutes

Original release
- Network: Netflix
- Release: 27 September 2019

Skylines is a German television drama series created by Dennis Schanz and starring Peri Baumeister, Murathan Muslu, Sahin Eryilmaz and Edin Hasanović. Hasanović plays Jinn, a hip-hop producer in Frankfurt, Germany, who signs to the record label Skyline Records only to find out later that it is a place where music and organized crime meet.

Skylines was released on September 27, 2019, on Netflix. It was cancelled after only one season.

== Cast ==
- Edin Hasanović as Jinn
- Murathan Muslu as Kalifa
- Peri Baumeister as Sara
- Anna Herrmann as Lily
- Sahin Eryilmaz as Semir
- Richy Müller as Raimund
- Erdal Yıldız as Ardan
- Lisa Maria Potthoff as Celine
- Ilir Rexhepi as Juli
- Slavko Popadic as Dejan
- Carol Schuler as Zilan
- Dustin Schanz as Manuel
- Zejhun Demirov as Pezo
- Carlo Ljubek as Miro
- Sascha Nathan as Hocki
- Kasem Hoxha as Thanas Kelmendi

== Episodes ==
All episodes were released on September 27, 2019.

No.	Title	Directed by
1	"Zero Six Nine"	Max Erlenwein
2	"Skyline Shines"	
3	"What I Mean"	
4	"Storm"	
5	"Rose in Concrete"	
6	"Angel or Devil"	
