= Tetje Mierendorf =

German actor

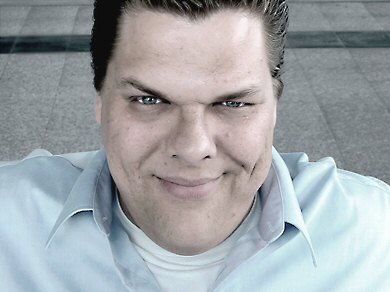
Mierendorf in 2004

Tetje Mierendorf (born 18 April 1972) is a German actor and comedian.

== Biography ==
Mierendorf was born in Hamburg, West Germany. After his Abitur, he completed an apprenticeship as bank teller. In 2004, he played the leading part of the German adaption of My Big Fat Obnoxious Fiance. Later, he was a permanent member of the ensemble of the improv comedy show Schillerstraße. In December 2005, Mierendorf played the role of the elephant seal "Seele-Fant" in the TV adaption of the children's book Urmal from the Ice Age from German writer Max Kruse. His most important musical theatre roles were "The Big Bopper" in the German production of Buddy – The Buddy Holly Story and "Edna Turnblad" in the German production of the musical Hairspray.

== Theatre engagements (choosing) ==
- April 1995 to February 1997, Imperial Theater Hamburg, Grease, role: Vince Fontaine/Teen Angel
- December 1999 to April 2000, Imperial Theater Hamburg, The Rocky Horror Show, role: Eddie/Dr. Scott
- April 1997 to April 2001, Theater im Hafen Hamburg, Buddy – The Buddy Holly Story, role: The Big Bopper
- 2003 to 2004, Improvisational theatre Springmaus. Tour.
- März 2005 to August 2005, Schmidts Tivoli Hamburg, "XXLvis"
- 30 May 2006 to 11 June 2006, Schmidt-Theater Hamburg, "Emmi – Die Salomé vom Spielbudenplatz oder Sing, wenn du kannst" (Emmi- The Salomé of Spielbudenplatz or sing if you can)
- December 2009 to September 2010, Musical Dome Cologne, Hairspray, role: Edna Turnblad (alternate first cast).
- As from 2 December 2010, Operettenhaus Hamburg, Sister Act, role: Bones
