= Jan Sosniok =

German actor

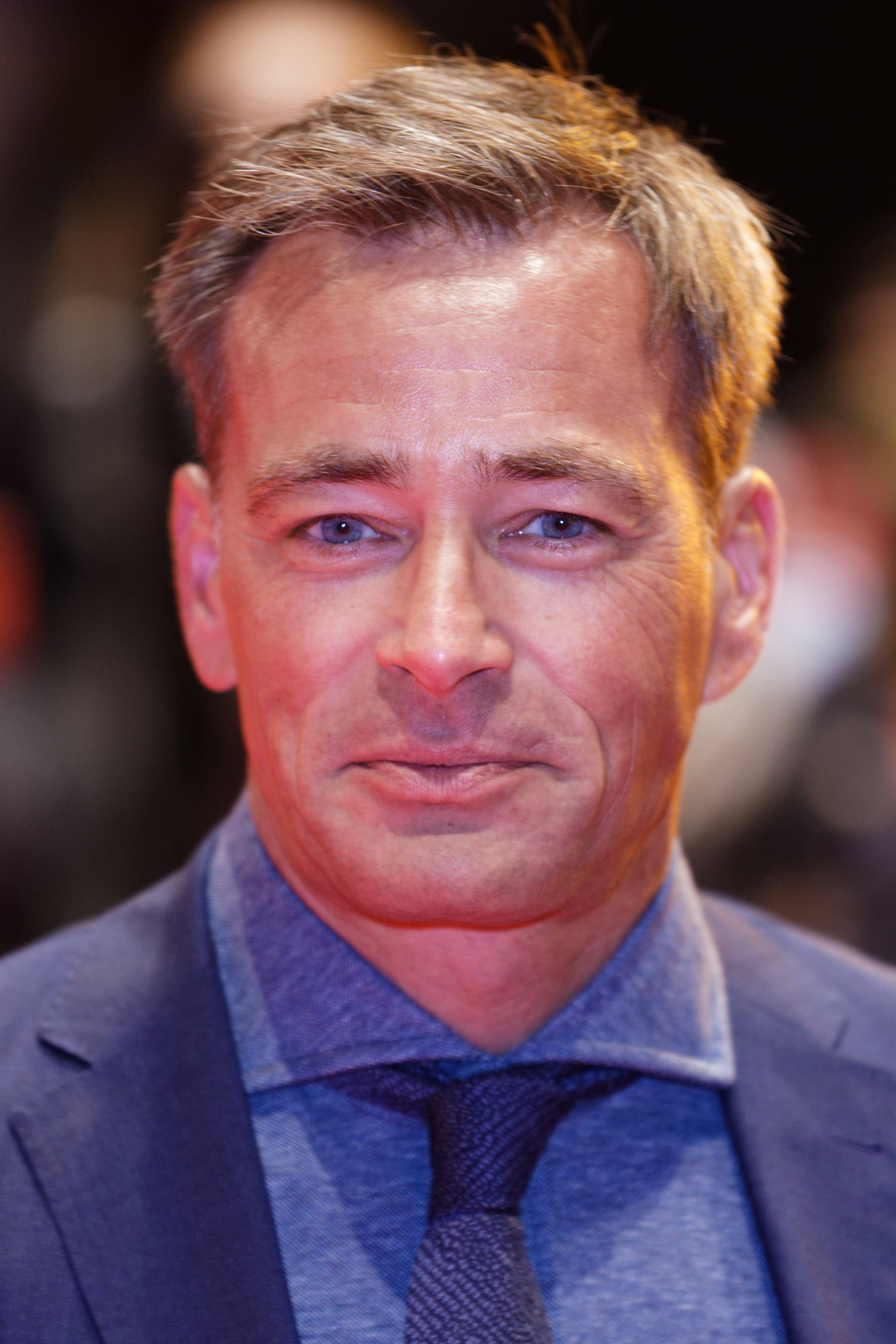
Sosniok at the 2017 Berlin International Film Festival

Jan Sosniok (born 14 March 1968 in Gummersbach) is a German actor.

== Career ==
Sosniok career began with a role in the German TV soap opera Gute Zeiten, schlechte Zeiten. Sosniok plays in TV-films and sometimes takes theatre-roles. He is well known for his role in the television series Berlin, Berlin as Sven.

== Theatre ==
- 2006: Die Erbin, Neue Schaubühne München as Morris Townsend
- 2013–2018: Karl May Festival in Bad Segeberg as Winnetou

== Filmography ==
=== Television ===
==== TV series ====
- 1994–1996: Gute Zeiten, schlechte Zeiten, as Thomas Lehmann
- 1999: Alarm für Cobra 11 – Die Autobahnpolizei, as Bernd Tulbeck
- 2000: Das Traumschiff, as Andreas
- 2000: Küstenwache, as Erik Lorenzen
- 2001: Der Ermittler, as Jürgen Haffner
- 2002: Einsatz Mord – Kommissarin Fleming und der Mord vor der Kamera, as Wolf
- 2002-2005: Berlin, Berlin, as Sven Ehlers
- 2008: Türkisch für Anfänger, as Vladi
- 2010-2014: Danni Lowinski, as Dr. Oliver Schmidt

==== TV films ====
- 2000: Sascha, as Ferdinand Keppler
- 2002: Das beste Stück, as Mark Demski
- 2004: Das allerbeste Stück, as Mark Demski
- 2004: Liebe ohne Rückfahrschein, as Martin Hansen
- 2005: Full Throttle, as Ben Klinger
- 2005: Macho im Schleudergang, as Tom
- 2006: Verschleppt – Kein Weg zurück, as Sascha
- 2006: Wiedersehen am Fluss (Rosamunde Pilcher), as Robert
- 2007: Die ProSieben Märchenstunde – Die Prinzessin auf der Erbse, as Prinz Herold

=== Film ===
- 2005: Siegfried, as König Gunther
