= Janina Uhse =

German actress

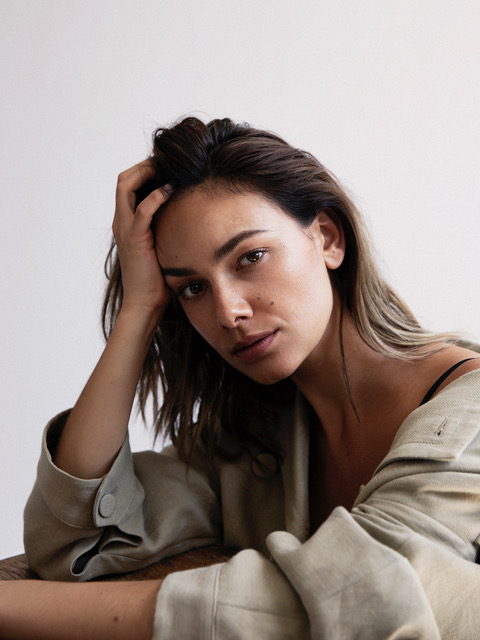
Uhse in 2019

Janina Uhse (born 2 October 1989) is a German actress.

== Life and career ==
Uhse was born in Husum, West Germany. She comes from a fairground family and she practiced acting at an early age. She began her acting career when she was nine years old, and her first role was in the TV series Die Kinder vom Alstertal. Shortly afterwards, she appeared in the TV show Die Pfefferkörner. In 2002, she made her first film debut in the movie Der Rattenkönig. Then from 2002 to 2008 she played the role of Melanie Peschke in Der Landarzt.

Ever since 2008, she has been in the TV series Gute Zeiten, schlechte Zeiten. In 2012, she went to college in Los Angeles to study acting.

== Filmography ==
- 2002–2003: Die Kinder vom Alstertal
- 2002: Der Rattenkönig
- 2003: Die Pfefferkörner
- 2003–2008: Der Landarzt
- 2005: Die Rettungsflieger
- 2008–2017: Gute Zeiten, schlechte Zeiten
- 2011: Küstenwache
- 2016: Unsere Zeit ist jetzt
- 2016: Leg dich nicht mit Klara an
- 2017: Donna Leon
- 2017: High Society
- 2018: How About Adolf?
- 2018: Unsere Jungs
- 2020: Betonrausch
- 2020: Berlin, Berlin
- 2020: It's for Your Own Good
- 2022: Family Affairs
- 2026: Mein bester Freund, seine Freundin und ich
