= Bernd das Brot =

German television puppet character

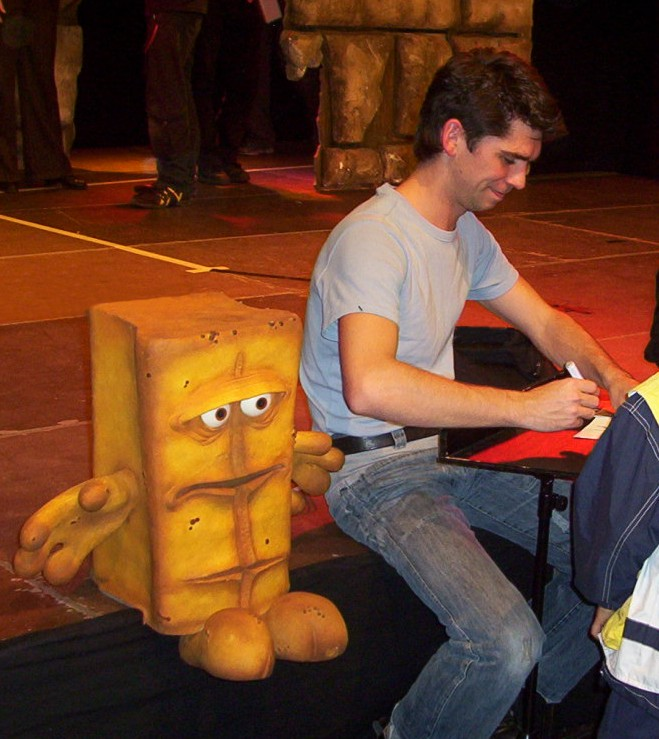
Bernd das Brot puppet and puppeteer Jörg Teichgraeber during an autograph session

Bernd das Brot (lit. "Bernd the Bread") is a puppet character, star mascot, and pop cultural icon of the German children's television channel KiKA, currently featured in the programs Bernd das Brot, Bravo Bernd, and the KiKA late night loop programme. He is primarily characterised by his chronic depression.

Bernd debuted on KiKA in 2000. He became a household name among adult television viewers in 2003 when his broadcasts were played on loop during the hours of 9 P.M. to 6 A.M., a time during which no regular programming airs. Bernd das Brot has gained a cult status among fans of the series, having earned the Adolf-Grimme-Preis in 2004.

== Role on KiKA ==
Bernd is a depressed and curmudgeonly Pullman loaf, speaking in a deep, gloomy baritone. He is small, rectangular and golden brown with hands directly attached to his body, rings around his eyes and a thin-lipped mouth. According to himself, he belongs to the species homo brotus depressivus. His favourite activities include staring at the south wall of his home, memorising the pattern of his woodchip wallpaper, reading his favourite magazine The Desert and You, expanding his video collection of the most boring railway tracks, and eating lukewarm gruel. Bernd sympathizes firstly with himself, and is bad-tempered and fatalistic.

His favorite expression is Mist!, used in the same way as the English "crap". His other catchphrases (translated to English) are: "I would like to be left alone", "I would like to leave this show", and "My life is hell".

According to his in-universe backstory, the short-armed bread character made his first appearance as part of an advertising campaign for a bakery chain. When the campaign became unsuccessful, Bernd was forced to apply for a job at the KiKA (more specifically, the MDR member of the ARD) which is also the reason for his permanent scowl. Bernd does not want to appear on television and thinks it is a "dirty business".

The reason for Bernd's depression was revealed in the 85th episode of the series. In his telling: "[...] A long, long time ago I fell in love with a beautiful, slim baguette. She was so unbelievably charming and funny. But unfortunately, my affection was in vain. She only had eyes for this perfect stranger, a multigrain bread. It was so devastating. [...] My heart has been a dry clump of flour ever since."

Bernd interacts with two principal characters, the chatty Chili and pleasant Briegel. Chili das Schaf ("Chili the sheep") is a female, yellow sheep with flaming red hair. Chili, the show's Gastgeberin (hostess), is a Stuntschaf (stunt sheep) who finds it exciting to have close calls with accidents. Briegel der Busch (Briegel the Bush) is a green, bespectacled bush with flowers and leaves in lieu of hair. Briegel is an inventor who loves to build complicated devices that almost inevitably explode of their own accord - these devices are usually what is sold on the show. In contrast to Bernd, they enjoy adventures and the excitement of life. Bernd doesn't hide that he doesn't think very highly of his colleagues, refusing to call them by name (instead calling them "Bush" and "Sheep" respectively) while they treat him as their best friend, even give him nicknames such as "Berndi".

The first show starring Bernd, Chili, and Briegel was the 2000 pastiche Tolle Sachen, die einzige Werbesendung auf KiKA (English: Great things, the only advertising show on KiKA) (KiKA is actually a public, commercial-free channel). In this show, Chili and Briegel would advertise an object that would be tested by a "randomly" chosen tester that would invariably turn out to be Bernd. Shows with Bernd, Chili, and Briegel also include pastiches of Robin Hood, Star Trek, Western and fairy tales.

== Production ==
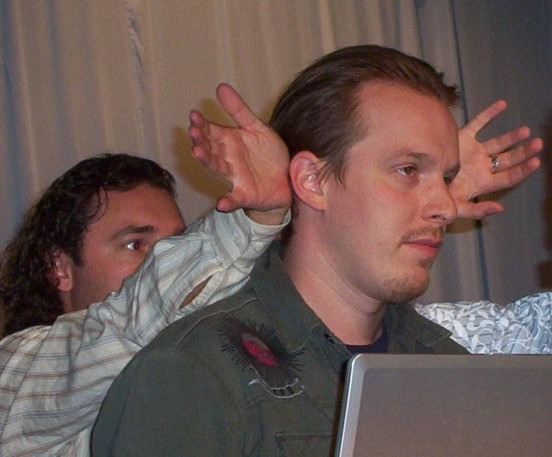
Krappweis (left) demonstrates the resemblance between Bernd das Brot and his colleague Norman Cöster (right).

Bernd was created in 2000 by Norman Cöster and Tommy Krappweis of the production company Bumm Film in Munich, Bavaria. KiKA had asked several entertainment companies to create a new sheep mascot, including The Jim Henson Company. Krappweis and Cöster were dining in a pizzeria one night and scribbled sketches on a napkin while watching a bread basket. Cöster said, "Bread is funny". Krappweis obtained a square-shaped loaf of bread to which he then gave the face of his colleague Norman Cöster, who also shares many personality traits with Bernd. Upon that idea, Bernd and, later on, the other figures were developed.

Similarly, Krappweis himself served as archetype for Chili the Sheep, who - just like Krappweis himself in his earlier years - gets on people's nerves with nonsensical stunts, while Briegel the Bush was modeled after a further producer of the series, Michael Briegel. He, too, is said to have a predisposition for wreaking havoc - according to an anecdote, he once set fire to an office computer.

The completed character designs of Bernd and Briegel are the work of cartoonist Georg Graf von Westphalen. Bernd is played and voiced by puppeteer Jörg Teichgraeber.

== Reception ==
Although Bernd was created in 2000, and has been on television since 2001, he first rose to fame in 2003. Until then, KiKA was sharing its satellite channel frequency with the Franco-German channel Arte, but after 2003, KiKA got the frequency for itself. As a children's channel, KiKA did not air programs between 9:00 p.m. and 6:00 a.m., but instead of putting a simple test card, programmers decided to air a late night loop program starring Bernd every night. In the 2005 version of the program, Bernd constantly stated that he had had enough of television and was going home and advised the viewers to do likewise. The night loop program continues to this day. This program allowed late-night adult viewers to discover Bernd; those viewers would then discuss the bread loaf on internet fora, buy Bernd das Brot merchandise and CDs, although none of them were advertised, and participate in Bernd-themed KiKA competitions alongside children. How many adult viewers watch Bernd remains unknown, because KiKA is a children's channel whose programs officially end at 9:00 pm and thus no audience measurement is made for KiKA during the night, at the time the Bernd night loop program airs. Furthermore, KiKA's main audience being children, adults are not counted even in audience measurements performed during official airing times.

Bernd has many child and adult fans in Germany and is greatly popular. Jeremy Wasser of Spiegel Online wrote that "Bernd epitomized the fundamental pessimism felt by many, if not most, Germans about, well, almost everything. (...) That Germans would take to a character like Bernd and be willing to engage in this form of self-analysis and self-mockery should, in my view, be commended. That the people of the land of Goethe and Schiller would choose as their guide in this spiritual exploration a clinically depressed loaf of bread, is, perhaps, just another improbable element of the German Zeitgeist". David Frogier de Ponlevoy, also of Spiegel Online, commented that Bernd shows were "a successful mix of slapstick and irony that irresistibly brings families in good mood." The Süddeutsche Zeitung wrote that the idea of making a depressed loaf of bread the star of a children's channel was crazily funny.

In 2004, Bernd das Brot won the Adolf Grimme Award for representing "the right to bad mood" and resisting "the reign of good mood that endlessly drones out of the television". The Deutsche Welle commented that "most likely the jury realized just how subversive Bernd das Brot's attitude is when many human beings these days are willing to do almost anything to achieve fame and fortune on TV". The Adolf Grimme Award is the German equivalent of the Emmy Award.

== Kidnapping ==
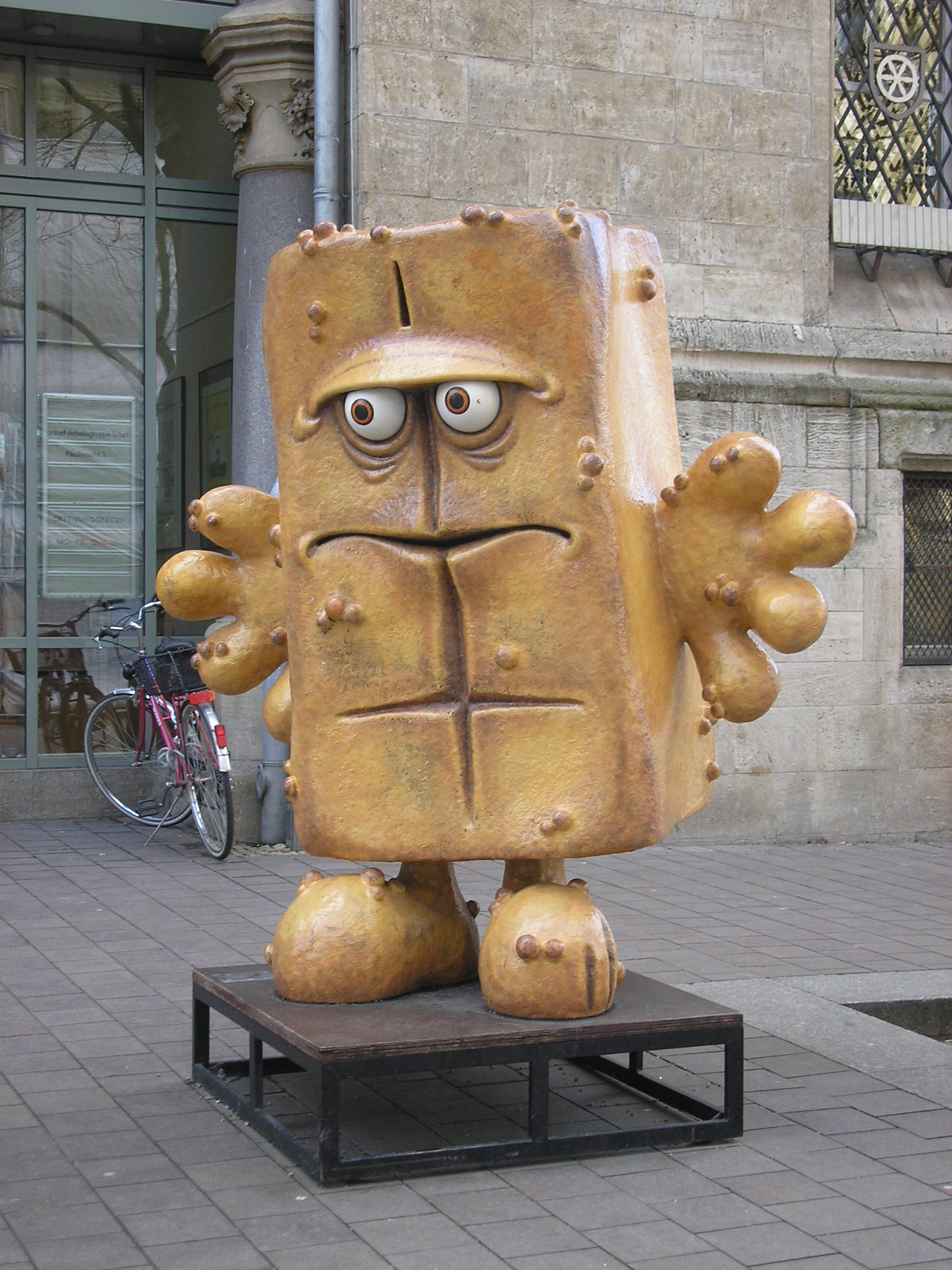
Statue of Bernd das Brot back in front of the town hall in Erfurt, Germany, after its kidnapping

In fall 2007, KiKA donated a statue of Bernd to the German city of Erfurt, Thuringia, where KiKA is based, to celebrate the channel's tenth anniversary. The statue is 2 metres (6 ft 7 in) high, weighs 125 kilograms (276 lb; 19.7 st), and is made of plastic. It stands on the Fischmarkt (English: Fish market), the city's main square, next to the neo-Gothic town hall, and is a tourist attraction. On 21 January 2009, the figure disappeared. It was next seen in a video released on YouTube, in which a group of activists calling themselves "Team 129 A" claimed responsibility for its kidnapping. Bernd expressed solidarity with the activists in the video, prompting several news outlets to joke that he had developed Stockholm syndrome.

The activists were squatting in the abandoned Topf and Sons factory, where ovens and gas chamber ventilation systems for the Auschwitz-Birkenau extermination camp were manufactured. The occupation was to prevent the city of Erfurt from redeveloping the area into apartments and office space. They opened a literary cafe and were giving lecture events. The negotiations broke down when the activists rejected an offer for alternative housing. The squatters themselves denied involvement in Bernd's kidnapping, claiming a group of sympathizers might be responsible for it.

The public broadcaster Mitteldeutscher Rundfunk, which owns the rights to Bernd das Brot, quickly forced YouTube to remove the video from the site by having their lawyers claim copyright infringements. Steffen Kottkamp, head of KiKA, strongly criticized Bernd's kidnapping. Krappweis called for the figure's return, stating that "Kidnapping, even of bread loaves, is the wrong means of achieving political goals". Fans set up an online petition calling for the return of the statue in Erfurt.

The Bernd figure was eventually found intact by chance on 1 February 2009 in the basement vault of a disused barracks in Nohra, between Erfurt and Weimar. According to Spiegel Online, five children had been searching the area to collect period artifacts before it was demolished. They then discovered the Bernd statue and alerted KiKA and the police. How the statue ended up there is unknown. After forensics experts confirmed that it was the genuine statue, it was carried out of the basement by seven police officers and ultimately brought back to its original location on the Fischmarkt in front of Erfurt's town hall.

== Works ==
=== Music ===
Chart placements
Singles

"Tanzt das Brot"
GER	41	22 September 2003	(18 weeks)
"Bernds Balkon"
GER	88	9 August 2004	(2 weeks)

- 2003: Tanzt das Brot (Single)
- 2003: Rockt das Brot (Album)
  Chili-TV-Rap / Ich habe ein kleines Cha Cha Cha / Ich sage NEIN / Zu spät / Bluesbrot Bernd / Briegel, komm / Ich will wieder heim / Tanzt das Brot / Saulaut (gesungen von Chili dem Schaf) / Bielefeld / Easy Briegel / Schreit das Schaf (gesungen von Chili dem Schaf) / Buschig, brotig, chilischarf / Geht einfach alle weg / Dubididum
- 2004: Bernds Balkon (Single)

Exklusives on Sampler:

- 2001: Was geht ab? (on the Sampler KiKA-Hits)
- 2007: Tanzt das Brot (Party-Mix 2007) (on the Sampler KiKA Hits – Das Beste aus den ersten 10 Jahren)
- 2007: P… wie Party (on the Sampler KiKA Geburtstagsparty)
- 2008: Fußball Fußball Hey Hey Hey (on the Sampler KiKA Fußball-Hits)

=== Video games ===
- Kikania (2001, Ubisoft)
- Bernd das Brot und die Unmöglichen (2013, Deep Silver)
