= Felicitas Woll =

German actress (born 1980)

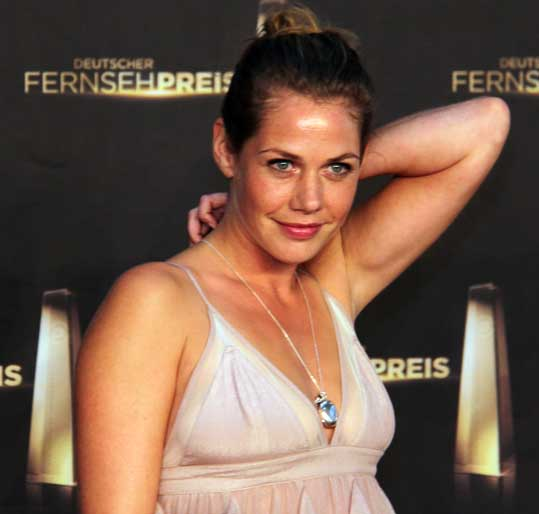
- Woll in 2012
- Born: 20 January 1980 (age 46); Homberg, Hesse, West Germany
- Occupation: Actress
- Years active: 1999–present
- Children: 2

Felicitas Woll (born 20 January 1980) is a German actress. She is perhaps best known for her roles in the television series Berlin, Berlin (2002–2005) and the television film Dresden (2006).

== Biography ==
Felicitas Woll grew up in Harbshausen (Hesse). She took an apprenticeship as a nurse, but became an actress after she met the theatrical agent Frank Oliver Schulz. After a casting session she was cast and appeared in the TV Series Die Camper, subsequently remaining with the show for three years. In 1998 she began taking acting lessons at the Düsseldorfer Tanzhaus (Düsseldorf Dance House) under Wladimir Matuchin. She plays piano, guitar and keyboards and gained theatrical experience as a singer.

After her role as 'Tanja Ewermann' in Die Camper, she was cast in Für alle Fälle Stefanie and Hamann-Spezial. At the end of 1999 she appeared in the starring role in the German-Chinese Co-Production True Love Is Invisible (a TV series) and in a family series for Germany's second public service TV channel, ZDF (Nesthocker – Familie zu verschenken). Success continued in 2001 with Mädchen, Mädchen by Dennis Gansel, her breakthrough.

The biggest success in her early career was as 'Lolle', acting with Jan Sosniok (Sven Ehlers), his best friend Hart (Matthias Klimsa) and Lolles best friend Sarah (Rhea Harder), in the ARD pre-prime time show Berlin, Berlin, which won the 2002 Deutschen Fernsehpreis, the 2003 Adolf-Grimme-Preis and in 2004 the Goldene Rose von Lucerne for best female actress in a sitcom. For Berlin, Berlin she received an Emmy in 2004.

In 2004 she played 'Mia', the female lead role in Abgefahren.

2005 saw her appear in the ZDF co-production Dresden (original title The Fire). In the film, a young German nurse (Woll), falls in love with a wounded English bomber pilot (played by John Light) on the eve of the destruction of the city by allied bombers in February 1945. The movie was filmed in Dresden's rebuilt city centre as well as at the railway station (also rebuilt) and in other parts of Dresden. Other scenes including the ones in Theaterplatz square and at the Fürstenzug mural, were filmed in Chemnitz and at an industrial estate in Cologne, in order to use remote studios to film the larger fire scenes, such as the firestorm. The film, in which Heiner Lauterbach and Wolfgang Stumph also star, was broadcast in two parts on 5 March and 6 March 2006.

In 2005 Woll supported the cause of people with Down syndrome (Trisomie 21) in a billboard campaign of the DS-Infocenter charity. Campaign billboards and post cards pictured her with her younger brother, Tassilo, who was born with Down syndrome. The wording on the posters read: "A brother with Down's Syndrome is sometimes like hell. Just like every other brother in fact."

Having announced her pregnancy in November 2005, she gave birth to a daughter named Taisha Valentina on 14 February 2006.

In 2008, Woll portrayed Wörterfee, a new character on the German adaptation of Sesame Street (Sesamstraße).

In 2011, she played Bertha Benz in the ARD TV movie Carl & Bertha.

== Filmography ==
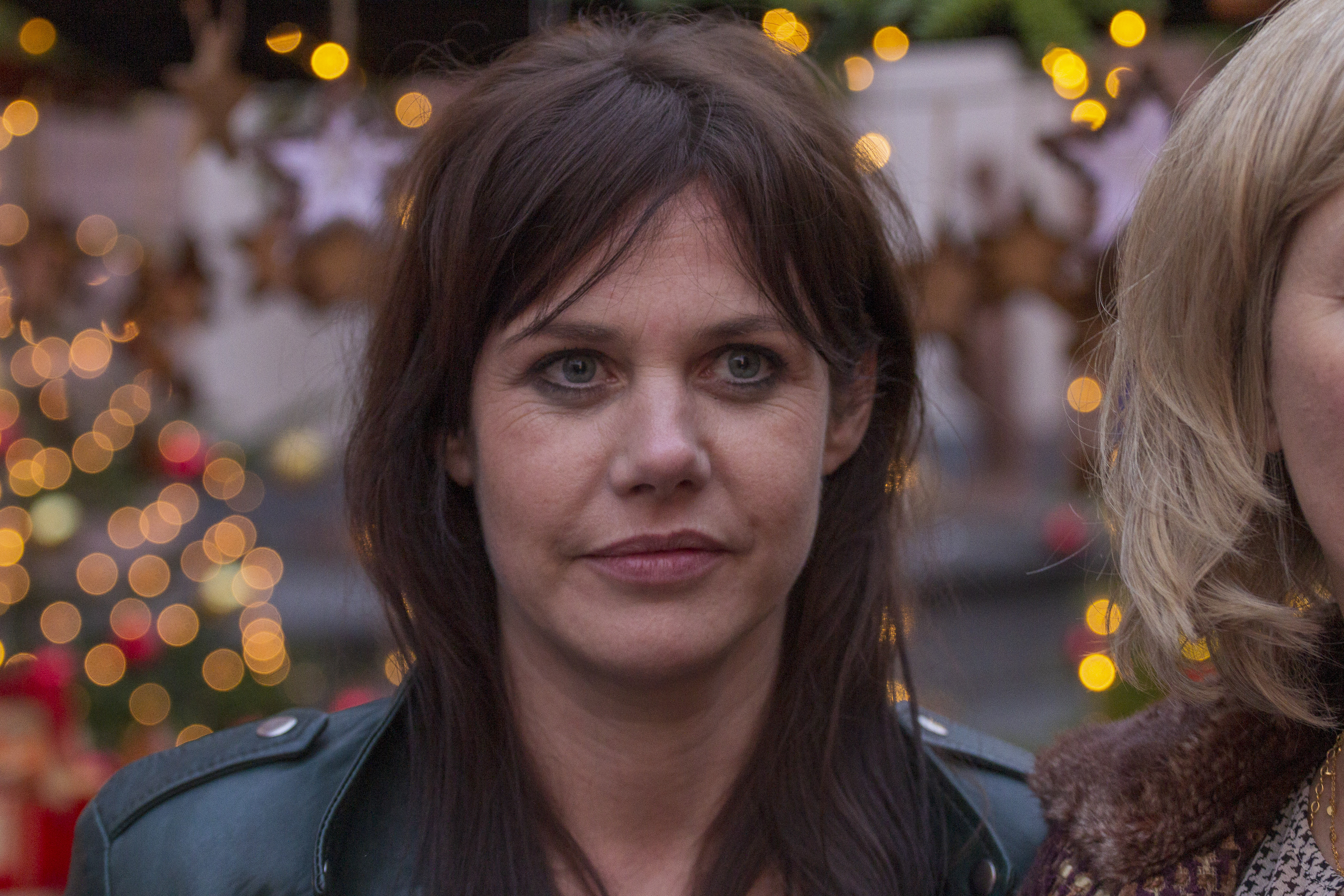
Woll on the set of Weihnachtstöchter in 2019

- 2013 – Murder by Numbers, ZDF, as 'Beatrice Grüber'
- 2013 – Snow White Must Die, ZDF, as 'Pia Kirchhoff'
- 2011 – Carl & Bertha, ARD, TV film, first broadcast 23 May 2011
- 2010 – Mia and the Millionaire
- 2009 – Beloved Berlin Wall
- 2008 – The Wall: The Final Days, Sat.1, as 'Mandy Knoop'
- 2006 – Dresden, ZDF, as 'Anna Mauth'
- 2004 – Eine Krone für Isabell, ZDF, TV film, first broadcast 1 January 2006
- 2004 – Abgefahren, BR Deutschland, second big-screen feature film
- 2001 to 2005 – Berlin, Berlin, TV cult series, ARD, as 'Lolle'
- 2002 – Tatort, ARD, long-running TV series since 1970, guest star
- 2002 – Dr. Sommerfeld, ARD, TV series, guest star
- 2002 – Inshallah – Club der Träume, ZDF, TV series
- 2001 – Mädchen, Mädchen, BR Deutschland, first big-screen feature film
- 2000 – Für alle Fälle Stefanie, SAT 1, TV series, guest star
- 1999 to 2000 – Nesthocker – Familie zu verschenken, ZDF, TV series
- 1999 – Hamann – special, ZDF, TV series
- 1999 to 2000 – True Love Is Invisible, TV series BR Deutschland/China
- 1998 to 2000 – Die Camper, RTL, TV series

== Awards ==
- 2002 Deutscher Fernsehpreis (best actress – Series – Berlin Berlin)
- 2003 Adolf-Grimme-Preis (Main role as 'Lolle' in Berlin Berlin)
- 2004 Rose d'Or (best actress – Sitcom – Berlin Berlin)
- 2006 Bayerischer Fernsehpreis for Dresden
