= Hotel Elfie =

- Country of origin: Germany

Hotel Elfie is a German television series.

== See also ==
- Girl friends – Freundschaft mit Herz
- List of German television series
