= Tommy Krappweis =

German writer, comedian, producer and musician

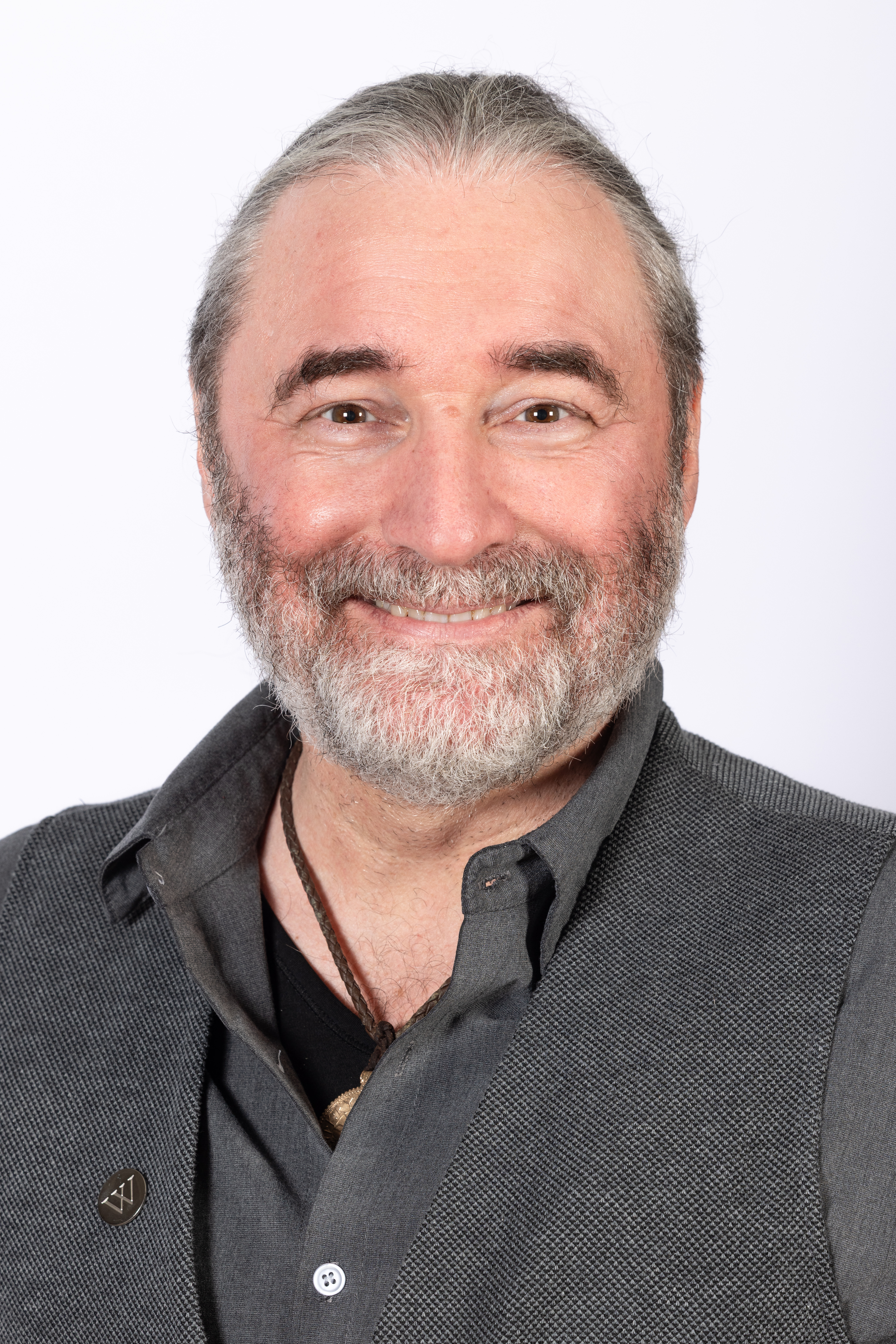
- Krappweis in 2025
- Born: Thomas Krappweis; 9 May 1972 (age 54); Munich, Germany
- Occupations: Comedian; Film director; Writer; Film producer; Audio drama producer

Thomas "Tommy" Krappweis (born 9 May 1972 in Munich) is a German writer, comedian, film-, television- and audiodrama director, producer and musician. Krappweis is the founder and managing director of the production company bumm film GmbH, based in Otterfing near Munich, Bavaria.

== Career ==
Tommy Krappweis became known as ensemble member of the german television comedy show RTL Samstag Nacht, of which he was a member from 1995 to 1998, and as the creator of the KiKa character Bernd das Brot (together with author Norman Cöster), for which he received the prestigious Grimme Award in 2004.

He wrote and directed the movie version of the first volume of his fantasy trilogy Mara and the Firebringer in 2013/14, which won the Jury Fantasy Award of the german Role Play Convention in 2015.

His all ager bookseries Ghostsitter (2015) is a three time Lovelybooks Awards Winner. The audio drama series, based on the books written and directed by Krappweis, started as the most successful audio drama on Amazon Music Germany in 2017. 17 Ghostsitter adventures have been released until 2023, with new releases scheduled for 2024. Each release regularly tops the german Audible charts. The US-Version of Ghostsitter entered the Top 5 in 2020 and has spawned 4 Seasons so far (2023).

The 2020 audio drama Kohlrabenschwarz (with co-author Christian von Aster) was picked up for a streaming fiction series by Paramount+.

Along with the podcasting team Hoaxilla, Krappweis started live streaming Talks on his Channel WildMics on Twitch in 2020, reaching thousands of viewers every Tuesday with the shows #ferngespräch (Long distance call) in the years 2020 to 2022 and #nachsitzen (detention) since 2023. #ferngespräch invites experts, persons affected by discrimination and other people of interest. Tommy Krappweis and team were awarded with the Kaiser Maximilian Prize Tirol in 2021 and Krappweis was honored with the European of the Year Award in 2022 for his efforts in political and social education.

== Bibliography (selection) ==
=== Novel ===
- "Das Vorzelt zur Hölle" (2012), Knaur-Taschenbuch-Verlag, München
- "Mara und der Feuerbringer 1" (2019), Edition Roter Drache
- "Mara und der Feuerbringer 2", (2019), Edition Roter Drache
- "Mara und der Feuerbringer 3" (2019), Edition Roter Drache
- "Sportlerkind, meine Jugend mit Seitenstechen" (2019), Knaur Taschenbuch, München
- "Ghostsitter: Geister geerbt" (2019), Edition Roter Drache
- "Ghostsitter: Vorsicht! Poltergeist" (2019), Edition Roter Drache
- "Ghostsitter: Hilfe, Zombie-Party" (2019), Edition Roter Drache
- "Ghostsitter: Band 6: Jäger des verlorenen Serums" (with Carsten Steenbergen), 2021, Edition Roter Drache
- "Ghostsitter: Tanz der Untoten" (2019), Edition Roter Drache
- "Ghostsitter: Schreck im Spiegelkabinett" (2019), Edition Roter Drache

=== Audio Drama ===
- "Ghostsitter 1–17", Audible Original, since 2015
- "Die phantastischen Fälle des Rufus T. Feuerflieg 1–18", Audible Original, 2020–2022
- "Bill Bo und seine Bande 1", Audible Original, 2018
- "Bill Bo und seine Bande 2", Audible Original, 2019
- "Das Pummeleinhorn 1–6", Audible Original, 2019–2023
- "Kohlrabenschwarz", Audible Original, 2020
- "Kohlrabenschwarz 2", Audible Original, 2021

== Awards (selection) ==
- 1996: RTL Samstag Nacht (Goldener Löwe for Best TV Show)
- 2003: KiKA XL (Goldender Spatz or best children's programme)
- 2004: Bernd das Brot (Grimme-Preis for Idea and Realization of the character Bernd das Brot)
- 2015: Mara und der Feuerbringer (Film) (Jury Award of the Role Play Convention Fantasy Award)
- 2016: Jurassic Park Airport for SyFy (3 x Eyes & Ears Award 2015 in Bronze for Animation, Best on Air Spot, Best On Air Campaign Fiction)
- 2021: #ferngespräch (EU Civil Solidarity Prize as part of #EuropagegenCovid19)
- 2021: #ferngespräch (Kaiser-Maximilian-Preis as part of #EuropagegenCovid19)
- 2022: #ferngespräch (European of the Year Award from Human Europe)
- 2023: #ferngespräch (Europa Staatspreis as part of #EuropagegenCovid19)
- 2023: RTL Samstag Nacht – The Reunion (Deutscher Fernsehpreis – Nominee)
