= Nesthocker – Familie zu verschenken =

- Country of origin: Germany

Nesthocker – Familie zu verschenken is a German television series.

== See also ==
- List of German television series
