= Florian David Fitz =

German actor (born 1974)

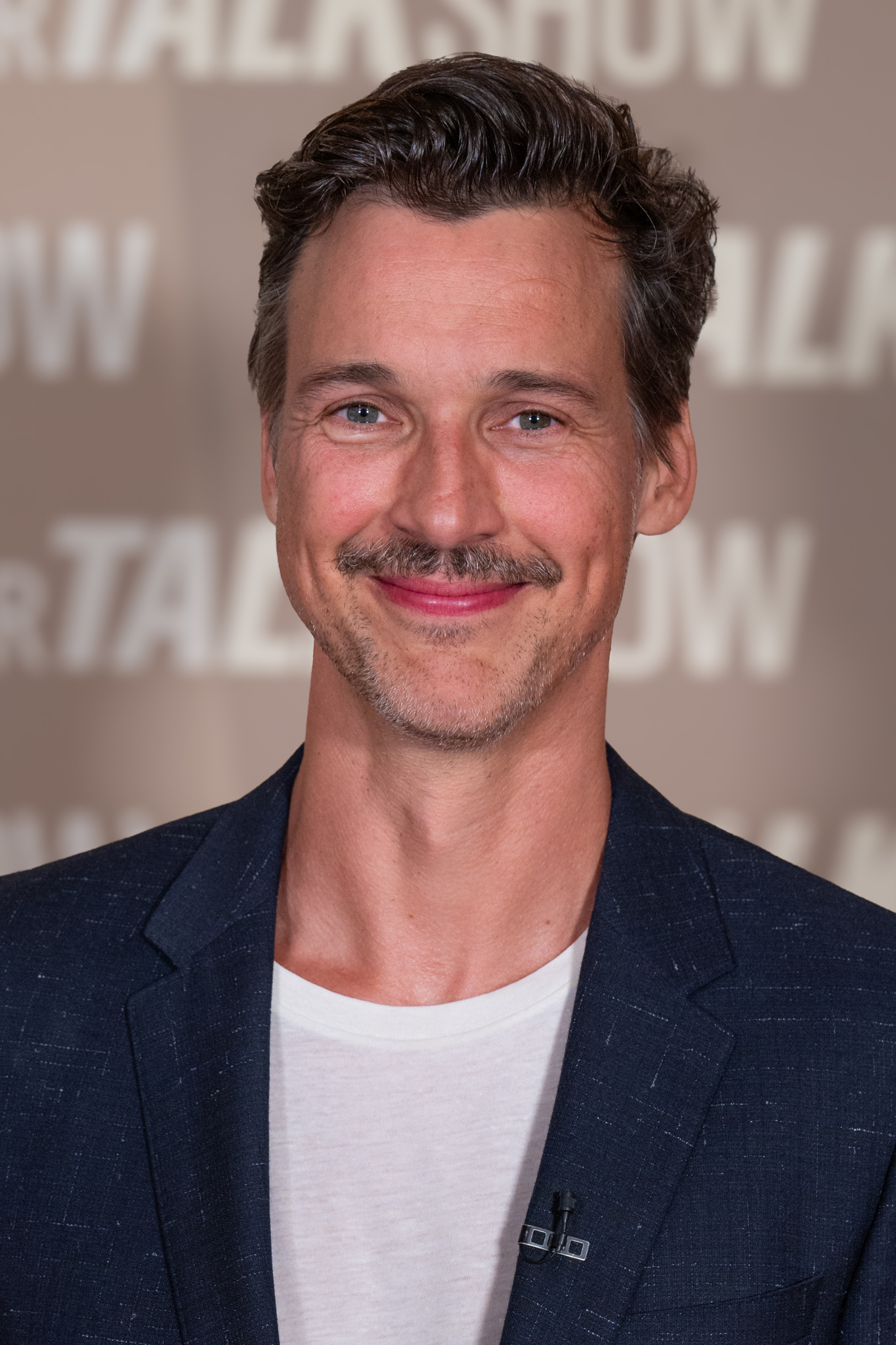
- Fitz in 2023
- Born: Florian Ingo Ulrich Fitz; 20 November 1974 (age 51); Munich, Bavaria, West Germany
- Education: Boston Conservatory at Berklee (B.F.A.)
- Occupations: Actor; director; screenwriter
- Years active: 2000–present
- Known for: Dr. Marc Olivier Meier in Doctor’s Diary

Florian David Fitz (born Florian Ingo Ulrich Fitz; 20 November 1974) is a German actor, screenwriter and film director.

== Filmography ==
=== Film ===
| Year | Title | Role | Notes |
|---|---|---|---|
| 2000 | The Psycho Girl | Kevin | |
| 2001 | Ice Planet | Sam Rainsey | credited as "Florian Fitz, Jr." |
| 2003 | Getting a Life | Kai Wendlandt | |
| 2004 | Mädchen, Mädchen 2 – Loft oder Liebe | Lukas | |
| 2005 | Three Degrees Colder | Olli | |
| 2009 | Men in the City | Niklas Michalke | |
| 2010 | Vincent Wants to Sea | Vincent | also screenwriter |
| 2011 | The Fire | Vincent Stein | |
| 2011 | Men in the City 2 | Niklas Michalke | |
| 2012 | Measuring the World | Carl Friedrich Gauß | |
| 2012 | Rise of the Guardians | Jack Frost (voice) | German version |
| 2012 | Jesus Loves Me | Jeshua | also director and screenwriter |
| 2013 | Quality Time | Conrad Schuster | also screenwriter |
| 2014 | Lügen und andere Wahrheiten | Andi | |
| 2014 | Tour de Force | Hannes | |
| 2014 | The Lies of the Victors | Fabian Groys | |
| 2016 | The Most Beautiful Day | Benno | also director and screenwriter |
| 2016 | Welcome to Germany | Philipp Hartmann | |
| 2017 | A Dog's Purpose | Bailey | German version |
| 2018 | How About Adolf? | Thomas Böttcher | |
| 2018 | 100 Things | Paul | also director and screenwriter |
| 2019 | The Perfect Secret | Pepe Deneke | |
| 2022 | Locked-in Society | Peter Mertens | |
| 2022 | Family Affairs | Thomas Böttcher | |
| 2022 | Oskar's Dress | Ben Kornmann | also screenwriter |
| 2023 | Weekend Rebels | Mirco | |
| 2025 | No Hit Wonder | Daniel | also screenwriter |

=== Television ===
| Year | Title | Role | Notes |
|---|---|---|---|
| 2000 | Der Bulle von Tölz | Flo Scherer | 1 episode |
| 2002 | Verdammt verliebt | Tom Severin | Main role - 26 episodes |
| 2004 | Schulmädchen | Florian | 1 episode |
| 2004 | Berlin, Berlin | Felix | 1 episode |
| 2005 | Liebe hat Vorfahrt | Robert Mayer | Television film |
| 2005 | Ausgerechnet Weihnachten | Fritz | Television film |
| 2006 | Eine Chance für die Liebe | Alexander Roller | Television film |
| 2006 | Kiss me Kismet | Götz Schinkel | Television film |
| 2006 | Léon & Lara | Léon | Television film |
| 2007 | Noch einmal zwanzig sein | Hans Klein | Television film |
| 2007 | Fast ein Volltreffer | Timo Hagemann | Television film |
| 2007–2009 | Doktor Martin | Nils Breitens | 11 episodes |
| 2008 | Love a Dream | Max Lessing | Television film |
| 2010 | Amigo | Jupp Sauerland | Television film |
| 2008–2011 | Doctor's Diary | Dr. Marc Meier | Main role - 22 episodes |
| 2016 | The Verdict | Lars Koch | Television film |
| 2016 | Erich Kästner and Little Tuesday | Erich Kästner | Television film |
