= Tanja von Lahnstein =

- Verbotene Liebe character
- Miriam Lahnstein as Tanja von Lahnstein
- Portrayed by: Miriam Lahnstein
- Duration: 1995–1998, 2001, 2004–2015
- First appearance: Episode 109; 21 June 1995
- Last appearance: Episode 4664; 26 June 2015
- Created by: Rasi Levinas
- Introduced by: Ariane Krampe
- Spin-off appearances: Verbotene Liebe: Next Generation (2021)
In-universe information
- Occupation: Businesswoman
- Father: Walter Wittkamp
- Mother: Annegret Wittkamp
- Brothers: Thomas Wittkamp
- Sisters: Meike Breuer
- Husband: Ben von Anstetten (1996); Rajan Rai (1997); Henning von Anstetten (2001); Ansgar von Lahnstein; (2008–2011, 2013–2014); Sebastian von Lahnstein; (2011–2013, 2015–)
- Sons: Hannes von Lahnstein
- Daughters: Emma von Lahnstein
- Stepsons: Carl Hansen; Nick Brandner
- Stepdaughters: Christina Brandner; Kim Wolf

Tanja von Lahnstein (née Wittkamp, formerly von Anstetten) is a fictional character from the German soap opera Verbotene Liebe (Forbidden Love) on Das Erste, portrayed by actress Miriam Lahnstein from 1995 to 1998, in 2001, and again from 2004 to 2015. Lahnstein reprised the role in the 2020–2021 TVNOW revival series, Verbotene Liebe: Next Generation.

From the beginning, Tanja emerges as an enemy of the wealthy and aristocratic Clarissa von Anstetten (Isa Jank). When Tanja fakes a pregnancy to trap Clarissa's stepson, Henning von Anstetten (Markus Hoffmann), into marriage, but Clarissa exposes her as a fraud and a golddigger. Tanja vows revenge on the entire Anstetten family, and Clarissa's total destruction. When her first husband, Henning's uncle Ben von Anstetten (Andreas Jung) is poisoned and dies, she marries murders his illegitimate son Rajan Rai (Sascha Zaglauer) to inherit his fortune, and then kidnaps Clarissa. Tanja murders pregnant Cleo Winter (Dinah Alice Schilffarth) to cover her tracks before leaving town in 1998. Tanja is held captive for three years by her ex-lover, Tim Sander (Roland Pfaus), for killing Cleo. She kills Tim and escapes in 2001, returning with another plan to marry and then murder Henning (now portrayed by Patrik Fichte) to inherit his fortune. The scheme fails, and Tanja and Clarissa are subsequently presumed dead in a plane crash together. Tanja returns in 2004, her criminal record mysteriously expunged. She ultimately marries Ansgar von Lahnstein (Wolfram Grandezka) and later his cousin, Sebastian von Lahnstein (Sebastian Schlemmer), having a child with each.

== Appearances ==
Lahnstein first appeared as Tanja Wittkamp on Verbotene Liebe in episode 109, which aired on 21 June 1995. According to the actress, the role had been planned for a three month run, but the writers kept extending it. Lahnstein explained, "In the first few years I managed it by shooting for half a year and then doing something else for half a year. So my role was written in and out over and over again. In 1998, I felt the need to try myself outside of Verbotene Liebe and left the series." Her last appearance was episode 830 on 15 July 1998. Verbotene Liebe writer Peter Süß said in 2009:

I think it is important for a telenovela that the antagonists are also punished. When I was the chief author of Verbotene Liebe, the character Tanja von Anstetten ... murdered three people, including two popular characters of the main cast, such as the pub owner Cleo. I then wrote Tanja from the series. She got into a stretch limousine at the time, the driver was the friend of the killed Cleo, Tim Sander ... [and] he pointed a gun at her. Although it was never seen, it should be clear that Tanja was shot. After my time, she was written back into the series ... and now a triple murderer just runs around at VL again, and no one gets upset.

Lahnstein returned to the role from 24 April to 5 October 2001, in part to facilitate the exit from the series of Isa Jank as Clarissa von Anstetten. Tanja reappeared for good three years later on 16 April 2004. With Lahnstein on maternity leave from the series, Tanja was absent from 9 June 2005 to 20 March 2006, and again from 30 March to 12 December 2007. Tanja's final extended absence was from 14 December 2009 to 6 April 2010. Lahnstein portrayed Tanja until the final episode of the series on 26 June 2015. She reprised the role in the 2020–2021 TVNOW revival series, Verbotene Liebe: Next Generation, first appearing in the ninth episode on 18 January 2021.

== Characterization ==
Bernd Peters of Bild wrote of Tanja, "For the past 20 years, the beautiful countess has only been about one thing: power, money and influence," noting that she will do anything, including murder, to get what she wants. The character has been described as cunning, manipulative and scheming, and Tobias Dupke of Die Welt wrote that "Tanja actually embodies evil". Lahnstein said Tanja is additionally "cheeky, snotty" and "a cold and tough businesswoman", noting that playing an evil character is "definitely more interesting than playing the sweetheart next door." She added, "That's what I like about the character: she experiences completely extreme things and always gets away with it." Lahnstein said, "I admire her a lot, even though I often find her character traits repugnant. She spins intrigues, she only cares about power, and when things get too tight for her, she leaves the men ... She is very tough, she does not allow feelings, does not get involved with others."

Tanja's first scheme in 1995 is to fake a pregnancy to marry wealthy Henning von Anstetten (Markus Hoffmann). When that plan is foiled by Henning's stepmother Clarissa von Anstetten (Isa Jank), Tanja marries Henning's uncle Ben von Anstetten (Andreas Jung). When he is poisoned and dies. Tanja marries and murders his illegitimate son Rajan Rai (Sascha Zaglauer) to secure his fortune. She murders pregnant Cleo Winter (Dinah Alice Schilffarth) to cover her tracks, but is held captive by her ex-lover, Tim Sander (Roland Pfaus), for killing Cleo. Tanja murders Tim and escapes in 2001, returning with a plot to marry and murder Henning (now portrayed by Patrik Fichte) to inherit his fortune. When Tanja returns in 2004, her criminal record has been mysteriously expunged by Donald Rush (Andreas Engelmann), whom she later kills with a poisonous snake and frames someone else. She becomes romantically involved with Ansgar von Lahnstein (Wolfram Grandezka), and softens somewhat with the arrival of their child, Hannes, in 2006. Her priority is now putting her son first, wanting him to have everything she always wanted for herself and willing to do anything to ensure it. The return of Tanja's mother, Annegret Wittkamp (Ursula Heyer), in 2008 reveals a vulnerable side to Tanja, as the story of her father's abuse and brother's death is revealed.

In 2011, Tanja develops true feelings for Sebastian von Lahnstein (Sebastian Schlemmer), and realizes that her relationship with him is more important to her than the power struggle she is in with her soon-to-be ex-husband Ansgar, Sebastian's cousin. She opens up to Sebastian about her past, and tells him that she does not want her children to be like her. Tim's son, Timo Mendes (Remo Schulze), arrives to confront Tanja about his father's murder, but seeing Tanja with Sebastian and their daughter makes him think she may not be as evil as he expected. Lahnstein said in 2013, "There was a phase in the past two years when Tanja fell in love for the first time, then married the man and had a child with him. This moment in Tanja's life is slowly but surely over. The writers want me to stay evil."

== Storylines ==
=== 1995–1998 ===
In June 1995, young blonde beauty Tanja Wittkamp comes home to Düsseldorf from boarding school to see that her parents are bankrupt and have to sell their stud farm. Aristocrat Christoph von Anstetten (Jürgen Zartmann) buys most of the horses, one of them Tanja's favorite. First allowed to visit her horse at Castle Friedenau and then hired to work in the stable, Tanja has an affair with both Christoph's son Henning von Anstetten (Markus Hoffmann) and working class charmer Jan Brandner (Andreas Brucker). She pretends to be pregnant with Henning's child to trap him into marriage, but Christoph's wife Clarissa von Anstetten (Isa Jank), Henning's stepmother, exposes Tanja as a liar and a golddigger. Tanja vows revenge on the entire Anstetten family, and Clarissa's total destruction.

Tanja disappears, but returns in 1996 as the wife of Benedikt von Anstetten (Andreas Jung), Christoph's hated brother, who agrees to help with her vendetta. Tanja learns that the mysterious Rajan Rai (Sascha Zaglauer) is Ben's illegitimate son. Anstetten butler George Helthay (Jochen Stern) attempts to poison Clarissa, but kills Ben instead, and Rajan inherits his fortune. As lawyer Marc Geppard (Peter Mustafa) attempts to defraud Rajan on Tanja's behalf, she begins an affair with Tim Sander (Roland Pfaus). Tim begins to see Tanja's true devious nature, and ends the relationship. But Tanja has noticed that Rajan is jealous, and pretends to be interested in him as well. She accepts his proposal to marry him in India, but once that is done she murders him and inherits everything. Back in Düsseldorf, Tanja meddles in the relationship between Tim and Cleo Winter (Dinah Alice Schilffarth), causing Cleo to break up with him. Her sights set on ruining Clarissa, Tanja kidnaps her and tries to secure her power of attorney from Clarissa's best friend Charlie Schneider (Gabriele Metzger). Clarissa escapes, but falls and loses her memory, which Tanja uses to finally take everything from her. A pregnant Cleo investigates Tanja, who kills her and makes it look like a suicide. Clarissa regains her memory and gets everything back from Tanja. Clarissa tells a heartbroken Tim that Tanja murdered Cleo, hoping that he will kill Tanja. Tim pursues Tanja to Portugal, and locks her in a cellar in July 1998.

=== 2001 ===
Three years later in April 2001, Clarissa learns that Tim has been found dead in the same manner as Cleo, and fears Tanja's return. Clarissa hires a private investigator and a bodyguard, and when no trace of Tanja is found in Portugal, Clarissa is reassured that Tim killed Tanja years before. In actuality, Tanja is already back in Düsseldorf. Tanja stages an attack on Marie von Beyenbach (Solveig Duda), knowing she is engaged to Henning (now portrayed by Patrik Fichte), and comes to her rescue. A grateful Marie hosts a party to thank Tanja, and Henning and Clarissa are as shocked to see her as Marie is confused by their reaction. Tanja explains to Marie that she was previously married to Henning's uncle, and quietly informs Clarissa that she will destroy her once and for all. Tanja arranges for Marie to walk in on Clarissa paying Tanja to stay away from Marie. Clarissa tells Marie about Tanja's many crimes, but Marie does not believe her. She and Henning, who was not in town when Tanja supposedly wreaked havoc on the Anstettens, go to Charlie for the truth. Though wanting to expose Tanja, Charlie is compelled to lie because Tanja has poisoned Charlie's nephew Oliver Sabel (Jo Weil), and threatens to finish the job.

Tanja schemes to get closer to Marie and Henning. She fakes a DNA test that makes it appear that Marie's father Martin von Beyenbach (Gerry Hungbauer) is also Henning's biological father. A devastated Marie and Henning split up, and he finds comfort in Tanja, who he believes has changed. He is about to marry Tanja when he and Clarissa realize that her plan is to marry and then murder Henning to inherit his fortune. He plays along, and after the wedding Tanja, disguised as Clarissa, shoots Henning in front of witnesses. Henning dies in hospital and Clarissa is wanted for his murder. Tanja plays the grieving widow, and is shocked when a very much alive Henning appears at the funeral and watches as she is arrested. Clarissa boards a private jet headed for a much-needed vacation, but is surprised by an escaped Tanja. The plane subsequently crashes in South America, and Clarissa and Tanja are presumed dead in October 2001.

=== 2004–2008 ===
Having survived the crash, Tanja returns in April 2004, her criminal record mysteriously expunged by her employer, Donald Rush (Andreas Engelmann). She helps smuggle counterfeit money into the country as part of a business deal with Ansgar von Lahnstein (Wolfram Grandezka). Tanja and Ansgar are fascinated by each other, and begin an affair. Tanja also taunts her nemesis Charlie, and seduces Charlie's boyfriend David McNeil (Sam Eisenstein) to get to her. After Donald tries to kill her, Tanja murders him with a poisonous snake and frames Bernd von Beyenbach (Ron Holzschuh) for the crime. Pregnant with Ansgar's child, she leaves town in June 2005. Tanja reappears in a convent in March 2006, having given birth to their son Hannes. She tries to maintain the pretense that she has changed, but soon returns to her old self. Tanja softens somewhat as a mother, putting her son first, wanting him to have everything she always wanted for herself and willing to do anything to ensure it. She disappears with Hannes in March 2007, faking their deaths with the help of Adrian Degenhardt (Klaus Zmorek). Tanja returns in December 2007 and is charged with child abduction. Having acquired evidence of Ansgar's criminal liability in a spoiled baby food fiasco, she blackmails him to testify in her favor in March 2008. Tanja gets off with a suspended sentence, but threatens to expose Ansgar unless he marries her, which is her only way to regain custody off Hannes. Ansgar nearly strangles Tanja in front of their son, but even after destroying the evidence against him, he must maintain their alliance else he lose custody of Hannes himself.

Tanja's next target is Ansgar's ex-wife, Nathalie Käppler (Jenny Winkler). Tanja observes a heated argument between Nathalie and Kitty Kübler (Monica Ivancan). Tanja secures an alibi for herself from an unsuspecting Ansgar, but orchestrates a scenario that will leave Nathalie without one. Kitty is hit by a car and killed, and witnesses Charlie and Elisabeth von Lahnstein (Martina Servatius) are led to believe they saw Nathalie behind the wheel. Natalie believes her arrest is a misunderstanding, but her alibi collapses and the evidence against her mounts, including DNA evidence planted by Tanja. With no other way to keep Nathalie out of prison, Ansgar submits to Tanja's blackmail and agrees to marry her. Evidence suddenly appears that exonerates Nathalie.

In August 2008, Charlie delights in telling Tanja that her mother, Annegret Wittkamp (Ursula Heyer), has returned. Tanja bristles when Annegret appears at her wedding to Ansgar, who has been forced into the marriage. He sees an opportunity to get information from Annegret to blackmail Tanja and get her out of his life. Ansgar and Nathalie try to discover Tanja's secret, which they believe is related to the mysterious death of her younger brother Thomas when they were children. Tanja's repeated rejection drives Annegret to succumb to her alcoholism, but before Ansgar can take advantage of this, Tanja has her mother held captive and drugged to keep her quiet. Annegret is freed thanks to Ansgar and Nathalie, but refuses to press charges against Tanja. Annegret finally tells the Lahnsteins the truth. Tanja's father Walter had been physically abusive to her, and when Thomas tried to intervene, he was pushed down the stairs by Walter and died. Walter blamed Tanja, and Annegret never spoke up, so Tanja was placed in a psychiatric institution for two years. In the present, Tanja breaks down in tears but still refuses to forgive her mother. Annegret agrees to leave town, but makes one last attempt to reconcile with Tanja. When even her threat of suicide does not get through to Tanja, Annegret jumps into a river to her death.

=== 2009 ===
In 2009, private secretary Maria Galdi (Simone Ritscher) reveals herself to be Francesca von Lahnstein, the mother of Ansgar, his brother Leonard (Lars Korten) and their sister, Carla von Lahnstein (Claudia Hiersche), who they believed was dead. Tanja realizes that Francesca being alive may work in Ansgar's favor to wrest control of Lahnstein Holding from Carla. Through a surreptitious DNA test, Tanja learns that Maria is not Francesca, but is her younger sister Maria di Balbi. Maria had been institutionalized after she jealously tried to kill Francesca at her wedding to Johannes von Lahnstein. Ansgar and Tanja put pressure on her to continue playing Francesca and give Ansgar control of Lahnstein Holding, or they will send her to a psychiatric hospital. Maria capitulates. Ansgar cuts Tanja out of his plans. She threatens to kill him, and he records the conversation as insurance. Tanja's efforts to get the tape are thwarted by Maria. Maria is unafraid of Tanja's threats of revenge until Charlie warns her that Tanja is a murderer. Ansgar realizes that Tanja has targeted Maria and they should take it seriously.

Ansgar calls a truce with Tanja, acknowledging that he cannot eliminate her without losing Hannes. But he and Maria have a plan to break her, and Maria locks Tanja in a small room, knowing it will trigger her childhood trauma. Tanja has a panic attack, and is knocked unconscious trying to escape. Rescued by Elisabeth, Tanja is shaken but more determined that ever to destroy Maria. Ansgar and Tanja each realize that Maria is feeling increasingly guilty about the lie, and is about to expose herself as an imposter. Tanja puts her plan to murder Maria in motion. Ansgar comes across an old letter from Francesca in which she admits that Maria's son did not die in childbirth as she thought, but was raised by Johannes and Francesca as Ansgar. When Tanja tells Ansgar that she has poisoned Maria and made it look like suicide, he goes to her rescue. Ansgar saves Maria's life, and confesses that she is his mother. Maria wants to murder Tanja, but Ansgar does not want Hannes to lose his mother. They decide instead to drug Tanja and send her to a psychiatric hospital. Meanwhile, Tanja has a one night stand with a man who turns out to be Ansgar's cousin, Tristan von Lahnstein (Jens Hartwig). Tanja and Tristan spend another night together at the castle, and the next morning Ansgar warns Tristan to stay away from Tanja.

A drugged Tanja is increasingly disoriented, and confides in Elisabeth that she faked the DNA test results, and Maria is not Francesca. Ansgar and Maria are too late to prevent Elizabeth from doing her own secret test, but the results only confirm that Maria is Ansgar's mother. Tanja hallucinates her dead brother Thomas, and Elizabeth realizes she cannot tell reality from fantasy. Elisabeth convinces a frightened Tanja to seek psychological help, but as Ansgar and Maria finalize their plans to have her committed to an institution, Tanja realizes that they have been drugging her. Tanja is too weak to help herself, but Tristan discovers what is going on and helps her avoid going to the psychiatric hospital. The next day, a strengthened Tanja pretends to still be under the influence of the drugs. She secretly acquires Lahnstein Holding assets, and takes Hannes out of the castle. Tanja confronts Ansgar and Maria, announcing that she knows everything they have done. Ansgar gives Tanja an overdose of drugs. Before she falls unconscious, Tanja tells Ansgar that she took Hannes and he will never see their son again if something happens to her. Ansgar is forced to keep Tanja alive, hoping in her drugged state she will tell him where Hannes is. Tanja regains consciousness, but falls down the stairs and is rushed to the hospital. She awakens again, and tells Elisabeth everything. Tanja demands that in exchange for their son's whereabouts, Ansgar must give her half of Lahnstein Holding and a confession on tape about his latest scheme against her, as protection. Ansgar considers his options, and suddenly, Tanja's health deteriorates dramatically. Before he can give in to her blackmail, she falls into a coma.

=== 2010 ===
Four months later in April 2010, Ansgar tries to become Tanja's guardian to get access her fortune, but she awakens from her coma. Ansgar and Maria worry that Tanja will reveal what they did to her, but Tanja has amnesia and Ansgar plays the loving husband. Ansgar and Elisabeth's conflicting versions of what happened to Tanja confuse her, and she is shocked to realize she cannot move her legs. Ansgar showers Tanja with sympathy and attention, and despite Elisabeth's warnings, Tanja signs a power of attorney to Ansgar. He is nowhere to be found afterwards, and Tanja begins to doubt her decision. Despite Ansgar's assurances to Tanja that they are in a loving marriage, information from Tristan and an internet search of herself begin to convince her otherwise. On Ansgar's orders, Tanja's therapist continues to suppress her memories. Feeling like a burden to Ansgar and Hannes, Tanja attempts suicide, but is saved by Tristan's brother, Sebastian von Lahnstein (Sebastian Schlemmer). As Tanja considers leaving Ansgar, her memories come flooding back.

Realizing what Ansgar has done to her, Tanja pretends she still has amnesia, but swears revenge on him. She calls off her plan to have him killed because it endangers Hannes, and Elisabeth realizes that she is herself again. To stop Ansgar from divorcing her and taking full custody of Hannes, Tanja reveals that her memories have returned, and that she will have Ansgar killed if she has to. Tanja discovers that Ansgar has taken all of her money, just as he sleeps with his cousin Sebastian's wife, Lydia von Lahnstein (Theresa Underberg). Tanja learns of the affair, and blackmails Ansgar to return her fortune or she will reveal it publicly. When he agrees to her terms, she realizes that he in love with Lydia and wants to protect her. Sebastian is devastated when Lydia confesses her affair, and Ansgar forces Tanja into a divorce. Tanja suggests to Sebastian that they join forces against Ansgar. Tanja and Sebastian sleep together, and Ansgar and Lydia acknowledge that it is a dangerous alliance. Lydia announces that she is pregnant by Ansgar, but Tanja learns she does not actually know if the father is Ansgar or Sebastian. Lydia rejects Tanja's blackmail attempt, so Tanja forces her to confess to Sebastian.

=== 2011 ===
The connection between Sebastian and Lydia is still strong, but Tanja doubles down on her efforts to have him for herself. Seeing that Sebastian wants a family, she pretends to be pregnant with his baby. But she fails to seduce him to make the lie a reality, and Tristan tells Sebastian the truth. Sebastian rejects her, but then shares his desire to have a child with her for real. The animosity between Sebastian and Ansgar has intensified, and Tanja gets pregnant by Sebastian. Sebastian represents Tanja in the divorce proceedings against Ansgar, who expects a windfall. But Sebastian has used Ansgar's own underhanded methods against him, finding Ansgar's secret accounts in Switzerland and blackmailing him to give in to Tanja's demands. She is pleasantly surprised with Sebastian, and looks at him in a new light. Arguing about Lydia, Sebastian accidentally pushes Tanja down the stairs, and fears for their unborn child. Tanja and the baby are fine, but she has mixed feelings about the pregnancy until she hears the baby's heartbeat for the first time, and sees Hannes's excitement. Tanja realizes that her relationship with Sebastian is more important to her than the power struggle she is in with Ansgar. She opens up to Sebastian about her past, and tells him that she does not want her children to be like her. Tanja tries to suppress her growing feelings for Sebastian, but his caring nature has begun to break down her barriers.

Tanja and Sebastian present themselves as a power couple for a business deal, and an impromptu karaoke duet overwhelms Tanja with real feelings. Tanja and Sebastian share a night lost in the forest that begins with an argument but becomes romantic. Tanja tries to forget about Sebastian, but finally admits that she is in love with him. Tanja is thrown when Sebastian makes a very sober proposal of marriage to her, but he rescinds it before she can answer because his issues with his father Ludwig von Lahnstein (Krystian Martinek) have sapped his confidence. Lines are drawn within the family over Ludwig's plans for Lahnstein Enterprises. Tanja is tempted to sell her shares to an outsider in exchange for Königsbrunn Castle itself, but her feelings for Sebastian hold her back. Tanja ultimately votes with Sebastian because she loves him. Though she has fallen in love with Sebastian, Tanja sees it as a weakness and will not let down her guard. Sebastian also loves Tanja, but cannot help but see her feelings for him as a potential means to control her. She is wary when he proposes to her, and she accepts with caution, while he realizes he is playing a risky game. Sebastian's continued connection to Lydia makes Tanja doubt his feelings for her, and she is afraid to let herself become too attached and lose control.

Tanja acquires Ligne Clarisse, the fashion company founded by her presumed dead nemesis Clarissa von Anstetten, unaware that Clarissa has just been released from the South American prison where Tanja left her in 2001. Tanja devises an ad campaign for a new perfume called Incest, exploiting the story of Jan Brandner (Hubertus Grimm) and his twin sister Julia von Anstetten (Nina Bott), Clarissa's children who were separated at birth and fell in love with each other as adults. Sebastian's sister Rebecca von Lahnstein (Jasmin Lord) is horrified by the idea and tries to stop Tanja, who frames Rebecca for stolen designs to neutralize her. Sebastian and the Lahnsteins side with Tanja, but Rebecca visits her revenge on Tanja by locking her in the ice cellar at Königsbrunn. Tanja is tormented by a vision of her father, who tells her she is worthless and will always be alone. Sebastian is surprised how worried he is about the missing Tanja. Terrorized, Tanja breaks down in tears when Sebastian finds her. He feels closer to her than ever before, and realizes for the first time how much he cares about Tanja. Tanja has another panic attack and explodes at Sebastian. She acquires a gun to feel safe from her father, but Sebastian sees her and assumes she wants to kill him. Sebastian confronts Tanja, but she sees her father instead of Sebastian and shoots him. She is horrified at what she has done, but Sebastian is only grazed and wants to understand what is happening with her. Tanja confides in him the traumas of her abusive father and the death of her little brother. A compassionate Sebastian, experiencing another moment of closeness with Tanja, promises her that she never has to fear anything ever again. He helps her face her demons at her father's gravesite.

Ludwig tries to use audio recordings of Tanja's paranoid delusions to oust her and Sebastian from the company, but Tanja prevails. She learns that Sebastian knew about Ludwig's plan, and despite his explanation that he intended to destroy the recordings, Tanja has lost her trust in Sebastian and breaks up with him. Tanja leaves for a photo shoot in Palma de Mallorca, unaware that Clarissa is there, trying to rebuild her relationships with Jan and Julia. Despite Charlie's best efforts, Clarissa spies Tanja from afar and is shocked that her enemy survived the 2001 plane crash as well. Clarissa vows revenge, but is encouraged by Charlie to put it aside to prove to Jan and Julia that she has changed. Tanja remains aloof as Sebastian tries everything he can to win her back. Finally, her jealousy over Sebastian spending time with another woman gives him hope for a reconciliation. Tanja and Sebastian learn from an ultrasound that they are having a daughter. He is frustrated that she remains unmoved, not realizing that she is considering giving him another chance. Sebastian finally gives up trying, Tanja decides she has to risk something for love, and reunites with him. Sebastian proposes, Tanja accepts, and in a quiet moment they realize they are happy.

Tanja and Sebastian want to be married as soon as possible, and travel to Mallorca. Charlie is horrified at Tanja's arrival, and tries desperately to keep her and Clarissa apart. Tanja is shocked to find that the local priest is Jan, who refuses to marry her and Sebastian. But Tanja confesses her love to Sebastian for the first time, and Jan relents, seeing that the couple are in love. Putting their hatred of Tanja aside to get her off the island as quickly as possible, Charlie and Julia agree to stand up as witnesses for Tanja and Sebastian. When Sebastian senses the tension between Tanja and Julia, Tanja confesses to murdering Cleo, her imprisonment by Tim, and then killing him to escape. Tanja gives a shocked Sebastian the opportunity to call off the wedding, but he only says that he loves her and that all that is in the past. Clarissa learns of the wedding, and seethes as her enemy Tanja happily marries Sebastian. The newlyweds leave the island without seeing Clarissa, who vows her revenge. Days later, Sebastian is with Tanja when she gives birth to their daughter, Emma, in an elevator.

=== 2012–2015 ===
In 2012, Sebastian hires his old friend Sonja Jäger (Pia Ampaw-Fried) as a new designer for Ligne Clarisse Lahnstein. Tanja accepts an investment from Ansgar in exchange for allowing him to name a co-head of the company, assuming it will be one of his family members. Tanja is shocked to receive a call asking about Tim, not knowing she is speaking to Tim and Julia's son, Timo Mendes (Remo Schulze), who has learned that Tanja is connected to his father's death. Tanja presents her "Mother of Incest" campaign, referencing Clarissa, and is shocked when Clarissa appears on the runway in a red wedding dress. Tanja fumes as Ansgar announces to the press that he has appointed Clarissa as the new co-head of LCL. Clarissa confronts Tanja for the first time in a decade, and comes away with the belief that Tanja has lost her edge. Timo arrives to confront Tanja about his father's murder, but seeing Tanja with Sebastian and their daughter makes him think she may not be as evil as he expected. Sonja takes advantage of Tanja and Sebastian's volatile relationship and schemes to have Sebastian for herself. A clueless Sebastian convinces Tanja not to fire Sonja, but Tanja tries to frame her for industrial espionage anyway. Sebastian finds out, and it drives him and Tanja further apart. Sebastian and Sonja become closer, but before they have sex he realizes he is still in love with Tanja. She and Sonja subsequently get in an argument over Sebastian, and Sonja accidentally falls down the stairs. Tanja is accused of attempted murder, but cannot prove her innocence as the footage from the surveillance cameras is missing, stolen by Clarissa. At first simply wanting Tanja to go to prison, Clarissa soon offers her the exonerating evidence in exchange for Tanja's shares in LCL. Tanja refuses but, soon out of options, goes to Clarissa and relents. But Clarissa has changed her mind, and wishes Tanja well in jail. Sebastian donates part of his liver to Clarissa's ailing grandson Timo despite her refusal to exonerate Tanja in exchange. Clarissa gives Tanja the evidence that can prove her innocence, and they vow to be civil with each other moving forward. Tanja and Sebastian reunite.

In 2013, Tanja and Clarissa cannot help but scheme and spar within the confines of LCL. When their conflict causes a lucrative deal to fall through, they call another truce for the good of the company. Tanja and Sebastian's marriage falls apart again, and they divorce. Tanja blackmails Ansgar into marriage, but is hospitalized after a limousine accident before the wedding can take place. Ansgar and others seek to take advantage of Tanja's subsequent memory issues. Tanja turns the tables on Ansgar and forces him to marry her, but she soon suffers a ruptured aneurysm and falls into a coma.

In 2014, Sebastian decides to take Tanja off life support, but she surprises everyone by coming out of her coma. They profess their love for each other, and Sebastian decides to protect fragile Tanja from what is going on outside the hospital. But Tanja stuns everyone by appearing at the LCL fashion show.

=== Next Generation (2021) ===
In the 2020–2021 TVNOW revival series Verbotene Liebe: Next Generation, it has been five years since Ansgar was arrested for murder, and the Lahnstein empire is crushed. Even the family's home, Königsbrunn Castle, is now owned by the Verhovens, a fashion dynasty who also acquired LCL with the help of Clarissa. Tanja vanished with all of Ansgar's money. Separated from her husband Sebastian, Tanja leads a life in the background. After Clarissa is killed in helicopter crash, Ansgar wants to find out who is behind Clarissa's murder. He originally believes that Robert Verhoven (Heinz Hoenig) wanted his business partner dead and could possibly be responsible. But a private detective, hired by Ansgar, later finds out that the true culprit is a blonde woman. Tanja later appears and pays Clarissa's former assistant Juri Kasky (Jannik Scharmweber) for his role in her enemy's death. As Ansgar takes over as acting CEO of Verhoven, Tanja appears and wants to work with Ansgar to get everything back the Lahnsteins lost.

== Reception and impact ==
Greta Sophie Matthias of TV Movie wrote, "Miriam Lahnstein in the role of her aristocratic namesake Tanja von Lahnstein shaped the series like no other and became an unforgettable TV face with her witty intrigues." Bernd Peters of Bild called the character "Germany's most beautiful and nastiest series beast par excellence". Lahnstein said in 2019, "Tanja is a cult figure, similar to J.R. in Dallas."

In 2011, Lahnstein was nominated for a German Soap Award for Best Actress in a Daily Soap, and was nominated for Best Villain in 2012.
