= Simone Ritscher =

German actress (born 1959)

Simone Ritscher (born 1 September 1959) is a German actress, known for her roles as Doris van Norden in Sturm der Liebe and as Maria di Balbi in Verbotene Liebe.

== Career ==
Simone Ritscher studied acting at the Theaterhochschule "Hans Otto" Leipzig from 1980 to 1984. After that she played in various theater plays. She developed a passion for acting in front of an audience and is still part of several plays to that day. In 2008, she was seen in Der Fall Winslow in Hamburg in a guest role.

=== Verbotene Liebe ===
Ritscher was first seen in the soap opera Verbotene Liebe in October 1995. She took on the role as Cecilia de Witt. A recurring role that served as an assistant in a scheme to antagonist Clarissa von Anstetten, played by Isa Jank. The role lasted a few months and Ritscher was last seen in February 1996. In 2002, she shortly was seen as Christina Hansen before guesting as Raphaela Klemm in 2007.

In the fall of 2008, Ritscher was cast for another role in Verbotene Liebe. This time she took on the contract role of Maria Galdi, a private secretary to a princess. However it was later revealed that Maria Galdi is actually Maria di Balbi, unknown mother of Ansgar von Lahnstein, played by Wolfram Grandezka. Ritscher debuted on-screen in January 2009 and was well received by fans. Maria took the identity of her late sister Francesca to secure her place in the Lahnstein family, made an enemy in Ansgar's wife Tanja von Lahnstein (Miriam Lahnstein), was almost killed by Tanja and then tried to kill herself and Ludwig von Lahnstein (Krystian Martinek) in a fire. Maria was then sent off to a mental hospital with Ritscher last appearing in January 2011. Shortly after her departure, the character was killed off off-screen, which angered many fans.

Over the course of sixteen years, Ritscher played four different roles, with one major. That is a record for the soap opera. None of her roles have a known connection with one another.

=== Sturm der Liebe ===
In 2011, after her departure from Verbotene Liebe, Ritscher was cast in the long-running telenovela Sturm der Liebe. The successful format brought Ritscher on as the new antagonist for their new season. Her role as Doris van Norden revealed that she has twins with Hotel director Werner Saalfeld (Dirk Galuba), whom she later married. Doris killed several people and finds an archenemy in Werner's ex-wife Charlotte (Mona Seefried). In 2012, she was included in the cast for another season. Ritscher then was announced to be leaving the telenovela in July 2013.
