= Oliver Sabel and Christian Mann =

- Oliver Sabel (Jo Weil) and Christian Mann (Thore Schölermann) in 2010

Oliver Sabel and Christian Mann are fictional characters from the German soap opera Verbotene Liebe (Forbidden Love), which was broadcast on Das Erste from 1995 to 2015. Portrayed by Jo Weil (Oliver) and Thore Schölermann (Christian), the characters were introduced seven years apart but rose to prominence as a same-sex supercouple. Weil later returned to play Oliver in the 2020–2021 revival series, Verbotene Liebe: Next Generation.

Weil and Schölermann were celebrated internationally for their cliché-free portrayal of a same-sex couple. Oliver and Christian's 2010 marriage was the first church wedding between two men ever dramatized on German television.

== Appearances ==
Jo Weil debuted on Verbotene Liebe as Oliver "Olli" Sabel on 31 December 1999. Olli is initially a supporting character with few lines of dialogue, but positive fan reaction prompted the writers to make Olli the nephew of a regular character. The role was Weil's first acting job after graduating from drama school. He played Olli until 3 September 2002, leaving to pursue other opportunities. Weil next appeared as paramedic Florian Lenz on the German series Medicopter 117 from 2003 to 2007. He said, "When they asked me to come back, they told me they were planning to create a new gay couple and [asked] if I would be interested in that. And if I was interested, they were going to make Christian gay ... it sounded like a good storyline to me, so I said why not." Weil returned to Verbotene Liebe on 2 November 2007 and remained until 6 February 2015, during the show's final season. From 2020 to 2021, Weil again played Olli in the revival series Verbotene Liebe: Next Generation.

Thore Schölermann portrayed Christian Mann from 27 November 2006 until 17 September 2013. It was his first major acting role. Schölermann took a leave of absence from the series in August 2012 to host the ProSieben music series The Voice of Germany. He initially explained that after finishing with Verbotene Liebe, he would be away until at least early 2013, and said "I owe a lot to this series and would be happy if the connection did not break." It was confirmed in February 2013 that Schölermann would not be returning to the series full-time, but temporary appearances were possible. He reprised the role briefly from 2 September to 17 September 2013.

== Characterization ==
Schölermann was initially surprised when he was told the writers would be making his straight character gay. He said, "I had to think about it because I wasn't sure if I could play a gay character truthfully or convincingly ... I was really afraid I couldn't do it". Schölermann took some inspiration from Brokeback Mountain, explaining "The movie showed how realistically and beautifully you can portray the love between two men". Acknowledging their chemistry, Weil said "We can be really proud of what we created and how much heart and energy and work we put into this story." Schölermann agreed, saying "It's important that we just not read the lines and do the scene. It's important to talk about what you want to do with the storyline and what you want to create." Both actors noted that though some touching and kissing between Olli and Christian is scripted, based on the scene they often take it upon themselves to add these intimacies, and "little things that you have when you are in a partnership". Elliot Robinson of So So Gay wrote, "This additional layer of tenderness really gives the couple a warmth and realness that has no doubt been instrumental in placing Christian and Olli in the hearts of many fans. Whereas a gay couple's kiss may in other soaps be written into a script as a deliberate plot device, such as prompting a homophobic reaction in a third party, Christian and Olli's continuous and observable closeness only adds to the believability of the couple's relationship."

After two years of their characters being a "happy couple", Weil and Schölermann said they liked the conflict of their 2010 storyline, in which Rob Marenbach (Max Engelke) and Rebecca von Lahnstein (Jasmin Lord) try to come between Olli and Christian. Schölermann said, "For us it's so boring when we're happy. We like the drama and the conflict." Weil agreed, "When you're in a soap opera ... you have to keep it interesting." He added, "It's good to have some big issues to go through".

== Storylines ==
Oliver Sabel
- Verbotene Liebe character
- Jo Weil as Oliver Sabel
- Portrayed by: Jo Weil
- Duration: 1999–2002, 2007–2015
- First appearance: Episode 1188; 31 December 1999
- Last appearance: Episode 4649; 6 February 2015
- Spin-off appearances: Verbotene Liebe: Next Generation
In-universe information
- Occupation: Co-owner of the No Limits bar with Christian Mann; Former waiter; Former psychology student
- Father: Wolfgang Sabel
- Mother: Henriette Sabel
- Brothers: 1
- Half-sisters: Bella Jacob
- Husband: Christian Mann
- Uncles: Thomas Schneider; Lars Schneider
- Aunts: Charlie Schneider
- First cousins: Olivia Schneider; Bella Jacob; Sophia von Lahnstein

Christian Mann
- Verbotene Liebe character
- Thore Schölermann as Christian Mann
- Portrayed by: Thore Schölermann
- Duration: 2006–2013
- First appearance: Episode 2811; 27 November 2006
- Last appearance: Episode 4360; 17 September 2013
In-universe information
- Occupation: Horse trainer; Boxer
- Father: Wolfgang Mann
- Mother: Luise Mann
- Brothers: Gregor Mann
- Husband: Oliver Sabel
- Nephews: Christian von Waldensteyck
- Nieces: Katharina von Waldensteyck
- First cousins: Stella Mann; Sven Mann; Sonja Mann

=== 1999–2002 ===
Oliver "Olli" Sabel is introduced in 1999 as an employee of the No Limits bar, and is later established to be the nephew of regular character Charlotte "Charlie" Schneider (Gabriele Metzger), the owner of the high-society bistro Schneiders in Düsseldorf. Identifying as bisexual, Olli begins dating medical student Tom Seifert (Kay Böger) in 2000. Olli's mother Henriette Sabel (Susanne Seuffert), Charlie's estranged sister, appears from 8 March to 12 March 2001 and disowns Olli over his same-sex relationship. Tom's ex-boyfriend Ulli Prozeski (Andreas Stenschke) briefly returns to town in 2001, creating tension between Tom and Oliver. Tom sleeps with Ulli, and Olli retaliates by sleeping with a woman. Tom and Olli's eventual breakup spins Olli's life out of control, culminating in a drug courier job that goes wrong. Olli leaves town in 2002 to become a steward on a cruise ship.

=== 2006 ===
Christian Mann is established as the younger brother of Gregor Mann (Andreas Jancke). Newly released from prison, Christian had taken the blame for a gas station robbery committed by their gambling addict father, Wolfgang Mann (Jürgen Haug), who Christian believed could not survive prison due to a heart condition. Gregor and Christian's mother had committed suicide during their childhood, and their father died while Christian was incarcerated. In Düsseldorf, both Nico von Lahnstein (Verena Zimmermann) and Coco Faber (Mariangela Scelsi) are interested in newcomer Christian romantically, and Nico employs underhanded methods to get him for herself. He is sent back to prison for a time after being falsely accused of assaulting Nico's boss. Christian starts dating Nico, but breaks up with her and starts a relationship with Coco after discovering Nico's machinations.

=== 2007–2009 ===
Olli returns to Düsseldorf, and meets Christian in the 8 November 2007 episode. Olli is invited to share a flat with Christian and Coco, who are having problems in their relationship. Christian reacts negatively after learning about Olli's sexuality, but later apologizes. Coco begins having feelings for Olli and kisses him, which they decide to keep a secret from Christian. Olli and Christian bond on a camping trip, and Christian opens up about his aspirations to be a boxer. Olli agonizes over the fact that he is falling in love with Christian, knowing Christian is straight and dating Coco. In January 2008, Christian finds out about Olli and Coco's kiss and accuses Olli of pretending to be gay in order to steal his girlfriend. Olli goes to Christian's boxing club to clear up the confusion. In the locker room, Olli confesses his feelings to Christian and surprises him with a kiss. Christian pushes him away, making it clear that he is straight.

Olli sends an application in Christian's name to a sports college, which angers Christian but also touches him. He begins dreaming and fantasizing about Olli's kiss and becomes confused about his sexuality. Christian breaks up with Coco and confesses his confusion, though he is still unwilling to admit he has developed feelings for Olli. Christian talks about his turmoil over his sexuality anonymously in a chat room with a man who turns out to be Olli. They eventually realize they are talking to each other, and the ensuing confrontation reveals their mutual romantic feelings. Olli and Christian sleep together for the first time on 17 March 2008. Afterward, Christian claims he was only testing his sexuality, and is now convinced he is not gay. He cannot stop thinking about Olli, however, and his track entrance trial at the sports college goes badly until Olli shows up to support him. Christian is overcome with jealousy when he sees Olli dancing with another man, and locks himself in his room. Olli waits outside the door all night, and in the morning they confess their feelings for each other. Olli and Christian have sex, and officially start to date on 4 April 2008.

Olli and Christian try to keep their relationship a secret, but they are soon found out by their flatmate, Judith Hagendorf (Katrin Heß), and Olli's cousin, Olivia Schneider (Kristina Dörfer). The women are supportive and promise to keep the secret. Christian gets a boxing contract, but soon fires his homophobic manager. He hires his brother Gregor, who is subsequently surprised to discover Christian and Olli in bed together, but is supportive of the relationship. Christian wants to come out publicly, but Olli is afraid this will damage Christian's boxing career before it even starts. After Christian wins his first professional fight against homophobe Axel, he comes out by kissing Olli in the ring. Axel brutally attacks Olli, and the charges are later dropped due to lack of evidence. Despite an apparent successful recovery, Olli develops an aneurysm as a result of the attack and undergoes brain surgery to save his life. He survives, and the injury gives the police enough evidence to arrest Axel. Some time later, Christian collapses, and is diagnosed with myocarditis, a bacterial infection which has spread to his heart muscle. The news that this condition prevents him from participating in any kind of professional sport is a blow to Christian. His cousin Stella Mann (Anne Wis) notices that he has a gift for taming horses, and he begins training at Castle Köningsbrunn as a professional horse trainer.

=== 2010–2014 ===
In 2010, Olli and Christian's relationship is challenged again by the arrival of Rob Marenbach (Max Engelke), an event planner who is interested in seducing Olli. Rob's events at Olli's bar, No Limits, are a front for his drug dealing operation. Olli dismisses Christian's suspicions as jealousy. When the bar is raided for suspected drug activity, Olli accuses a furious Christian of arranging it. Their relationship is further strained when Olli begins to suspect Christian is attracted to women again, after Christian shares a drunken kiss with Miriam Pesch (Romina Becks) and is then kissed by a lovesick Rebecca von Lahnstein (Jasmin Lord). Olli confronts him, and Christian admits he is not sure if he is attracted to women. They consider breaking up, but soon reconcile thanks to a romantic trip to New York.

When Christian is rushed to the hospital with chest pain and the doctor excludes Olli because he is not a relative, Miriam suggests to Olli that they get married. Olli proposes in July 2010, and a shocked Christian accepts. Olli's ex-boyfriend Jonas appears and tells Olli that he is HIV positive and may have infected Olli when they were together. Christian is reassuring, but Olli is fearful that not only does he have the virus, but he may have given it to Christian. After an agonizing wait, they learn that Olli is negative. Christian proposes to Olli himself, and asks that they marry right away. Olli's mother Henriette comes to terms with his sexuality and they reconcile. Olli and Christian are married in a church wedding on 6 September 2010.

Christian and Olli decide to have a child, but face obstacles with adoption and surrogacy. They foster a young girl named Lily, and are devastated when she is reunited with her father. This puts a strain on the relationship, and after Christian parties with Andi Fritzsche (Dominic Saleh-Zaki) and Jessica Stiehl (Jana Julie Kilka), Jessica claims that both men had sex with her. This triggers Olli's fears about Christian's sexuality, and he asks Christian to move out. Christian lives at the stud farm in Königsbrünn until a fire destroys all his possessions. He is forced to move in with Charlie, directly across from Olli's apartment. In 2011, Olli witnesses Phillip zu Hohenfelden (Stephan Käfer) being hit by a car and falls into depression. Christian starts an affair with Theresa Erzberger (Eva Luca Klemmt), a coworker at the stud farm, but later breaks up with her. Olli attempts a relationship with Rafael Velasquez (Marc Philipp), whom he had met on vacation. Eventually Olli and Christian decide to dissolve their marriage. Christian consoles himself in the boxing ring battling against a friend of Axel's, and Olli arrives just in time to witness Christian have a heart attack. In shock, Olli wanders out as paramedics seem unable to revive Christian. Believing Christian dead, Olli realizes he is not in love with Rafael and breaks up with him. Olli goes to the hospital to see Christian's body, but is overjoyed to learn that Christian survived. Overcome with love for each other, they reunite. Olli and Christian remarry on 3 January 2012 in the cabin where they fell in love in 2008.

In late 2012, Christian accepts a job working with a world renowned horse trainer for several months in the United Kingdom. During his absence, Charlie tries to stop Arno Brandner (Konrad Krauss), who is dying from Alzheimer's disease, from writing a letter to Olli revealing he has a half-sister from his father's extra-marital affair. Olli finds the letter after Arno's death, and with information from Clarissa von Anstetten (Isa Jank) is able to find his sister, Bella Jacob (Janina Isabell Batoly). Charlie ultimately confesses to being Bella's mother.

Christian returns in September 2013, but tells Olli he intends to extend his work contract in the UK for another year. The strain this puts on their marriage is made worse by Christian's confession that he had a one-night stand with a woman when he was drunk in England. Olli is devastated that Christian has been unfaithful with a woman yet again, and claims to want a commitment-free open marriage. Though this makes Christian jealous, as intended, Olli is unable to go through with sleeping with another man. Olli begins distancing himself from Christian and ignoring his repeated apologies. Believing their relationship is truly over, Christian books a flight back to the UK. Before he can leave, Jessica locks him and Olli in their room to force them to talk. Christian professes his love for Olli, who finally forgives him. Olli agrees to accompany Christian to England for a short period. Olli returns to Germany, but visits Christian a few more times. The relationship is once again strained by their busy lives and distance apart. When Christian fails to come to Düsseldorf as planned, ruining Olli's surprise party, Olli gets drunk and has a one-night stand with another man. He confesses to Christian and travels to the UK to talk things out. Olli returns to Düsseldorf and announces their divorce. In June 2014, Olli receives divorce papers from Christian's lawyers, and signs them.

=== Next Generation (2020–2021) ===
Olli is dating Paul Verhoven (Lennart Betzgen) the 2020–2021 revival series Verbotene Liebe: Next Generation. In episode eight, Olli tells Charlie that he and Christian have remained friends.

== Reception ==
Verbotene Liebe received international attention in 2008 with the love story of Olli and Christian. The Berliner Kurier noted that Weil and Schölermann were celebrated internationally for their cliché-free portrayal of a same-sex couple, and Refresh called the characters "the world's most popular gay couple" in 2008. The same year, US publication Soap Opera Weekly said that, thanks to Olli and Christian, Verbotene Liebe was "hands-down" their readers' favorite foreign language soap opera. In 2010, The Hollywood Reporter wrote that "Christian and Olli have become cult figures in Germany and globally", and Variety also noted that the couple has attracted a cult following. AfterElton noted Olli and Christian's "worldwide legion of fans", and in 2013 Elliot Robinson of So So Gay wrote that thanks to the positive reception by audiences, Olli and Christian "have gone on to become a central and enduringly popular couple for the show." In 2019, Michael Patterson of What Culture wrote, "One of German TV's most revolutionary LGBT storylines, soap opera Verbotene Liebe made headlines for its authentic portrayal of the romance between Oliver Sabel and Christian Mann. The series had already received some attention for breaking ground with Olli's previous relationships, but it was this one that garnered international attention".

The Olli and Christian romance attracted attention in the United States when German fans put clips of the story online with English subtitles. Weil said he and Schölermann became aware of their characters' popularity outside Germany first through emails from American fans, and then letters. After a fan told Weil about the online videos, he noted that "We slowly realized the impact of all that. And yeah, we couldn't believe it." Weil said, "Then suddenly the snowball system started, French and Spanish subtitles were added in addition to the English. By the time we found out about it, there were already hundreds of thousands of clicks on these videos in languages that we didn't even know existed." Schölermann called American fans "more intense" and "more passionate" than German fans. Weil said of the difference, "I think our storyline touches people in a different way [in the US]. In Germany, people are used to gay storylines on television so it doesn't move people as much, but [in the US] it's still very special that you can see a gay couple in such a normal way and I think that's what moves many people and makes them have such a big reaction."

American viewers in particular "reacted with unbridled enthusiasm" to the storyline, recognizing that Verbotene Liebe "not only didn't hesitate to show same-sex affection, but allowed its gay characters' storylines the same prominence as the heterosexual ones." This was in contrast to the storyline unfolding at the time on the American soap opera As the World Turns of Luke Snyder and Noah Mayer, two gay characters who had been together for a year and still had not consummated their relationship. In 2008, Alexander Stevenson of Logo TV suggested that American serials "until very recently frequently treated gay content with kid gloves for fear of offending advertisers." On Verbotene Liebe, Olli and Christian are shown to have sex even though they are still unsure of their feelings for each other. Stevenson noted that other characters in the series are shown for the most part to be accepting of Olli and Christian's relationship, as a result of "Germany's more casual attitude toward gay people". In 2013, Verbotene Liebe was called "a beacon of LGBT inclusivity on an international level" amid the popularity of Olli and Christian.

Robinson wrote in 2013, "If you wish to watch a gay couple's story unfold and evolve, you would struggle to find a better one than that of Christian and Oliver. In addition to the well-rounded characters and significant stories they have been part of, what really sets them apart is their portrayal." He noted that, aside from the introductory plot of a straight man realizing he is bisexual and in love with a man, "Verbotene Liebe has never sensationalised the couple's presence. Their relationship is treated like any other in the show, with all the surrounding cast treating them, quite rightly, in a normalised fashion ... However, what really helps take this TV couple to the next level is the acting and, in particular, the chemistry between Thore and Jo." Weil and Schölermann said they rarely get negative reactions to their characters. Weil said, "Most of the time we get very positive reactions. Even people who say 'I'm straight, and I usually don't like gay characters, but we like watching this couple' ... They just see two people in love. It's not all about their sex." Patterson explained in 2019, "Christian and Olli's tale was one without stereotypes that ultimately educated international audiences on the fact that sometimes men can just fall in love with other men and, in doing so, they can live happily ever after."

Schölermann teased Olli and Christian's wedding, saying "Nothing like it has happened on German television before." The marriage, presided over by guest star Dirk Bach and livestreamed, was the first church wedding between two men ever dramatized on German television. Weil said, "Who would have thought three years ago that Olli and Chris would actually one day make the bond for life. I think that this event is a particularly great thank you for all our fans worldwide ... Maybe with our love story we can convince a few more people that love knows neither borders nor genders."

In February 2010, Sam Martin of American production company Aid & Abet acquired the rights to adapt the Olli and Christian storyline in the US, changing the setting from Düsseldorf to Portland, Oregon. In 2011, Olli and Christian won a German Soap Award for Most Beautiful Couple, and Weil received the Fan Award Male. Weil won the Fan Award Male again in 2012. Fans and the press sometimes refer to the duo by the portmanteau "Chrolli", (for Christian and Olli), or "Ollian".
