= Jenny Winkler =

German actress (born 1979)

Jenny Winkler (born 13 May 1979, Hanau, West Germany) is a German actress and well known for her role as Nathalie von Lahnstein on the soap opera Verbotene Liebe (Forbidden Love), which she portrays since 2004.

From 1999 to 2002, she studied professional acting at the 'Actors Company, Aschaffenburg'. After that she continued with acting training in New York City, before she became the major role in the stage play Fünf im gleichen Kleid (Five in the same dress). In the following years Jenny continued in her work on the theater and also played in short films, before getting a role in the television movie Berühmt wie der Mond (Famous as the moon).

One year later in fall 2004, Jenny joined the cast of Verbotene Liebe. Since then she impresses with representation of the heroine Nathalie, who suffered abuse in her marriage, lost a child, became an alcohol addict and was innocent arrested for attempted murder. Together with co-star and on-screen lover Wolfram Grandezka (plays Ansgar von Lahnstein) she created one of the most supported couples on the show.

== Filmography ==
- Verbotene Liebe (Forbidden Love) as Nathalie von Lahnstein (2004–present)
- Berühmt wie der Mond (Famous as the moon)
