= Ritscher =

Ritscher is a surname. Notable people with the surname include:

- Alfred Ritscher (1879–1963), German polar explorer
- Karen Ritscher, American violist and academic
- Malachi Ritscher (1954–2006), American musician, recording engineer, human rights activist, and anti-war protester
- Simone Ritscher (born 1959), German actress
