= Alles Bob! =

1999 film

- Theatrical poster
- Directed by: Otto Alexander Jahrreiss
- Written by: Markus Hoffmann (writer); Otto Alexander Jahrreiss (writer)
- Starring: Gregor Törzs; Martina Gedeck; Miriam Lahnstein; Christiane Krüger; Hans Peter Hallwachs
- Distributed by: Helkon Filmverleih GmbH
- Release date: 24 June 1999
- Running time: 99 minutes
- Country: Germany
- Language: German

Alles Bob (All About Bob) is a 1999 German film starring Gregor Törzs, Martina Gedeck and Miriam Lahnstein, directed by Otto Alexander Jahrreiss.

== Synopsis ==
A young man tells women what they want to hear to get sex.
