= Thore Schölermann =

German actor and television host (born 1984)

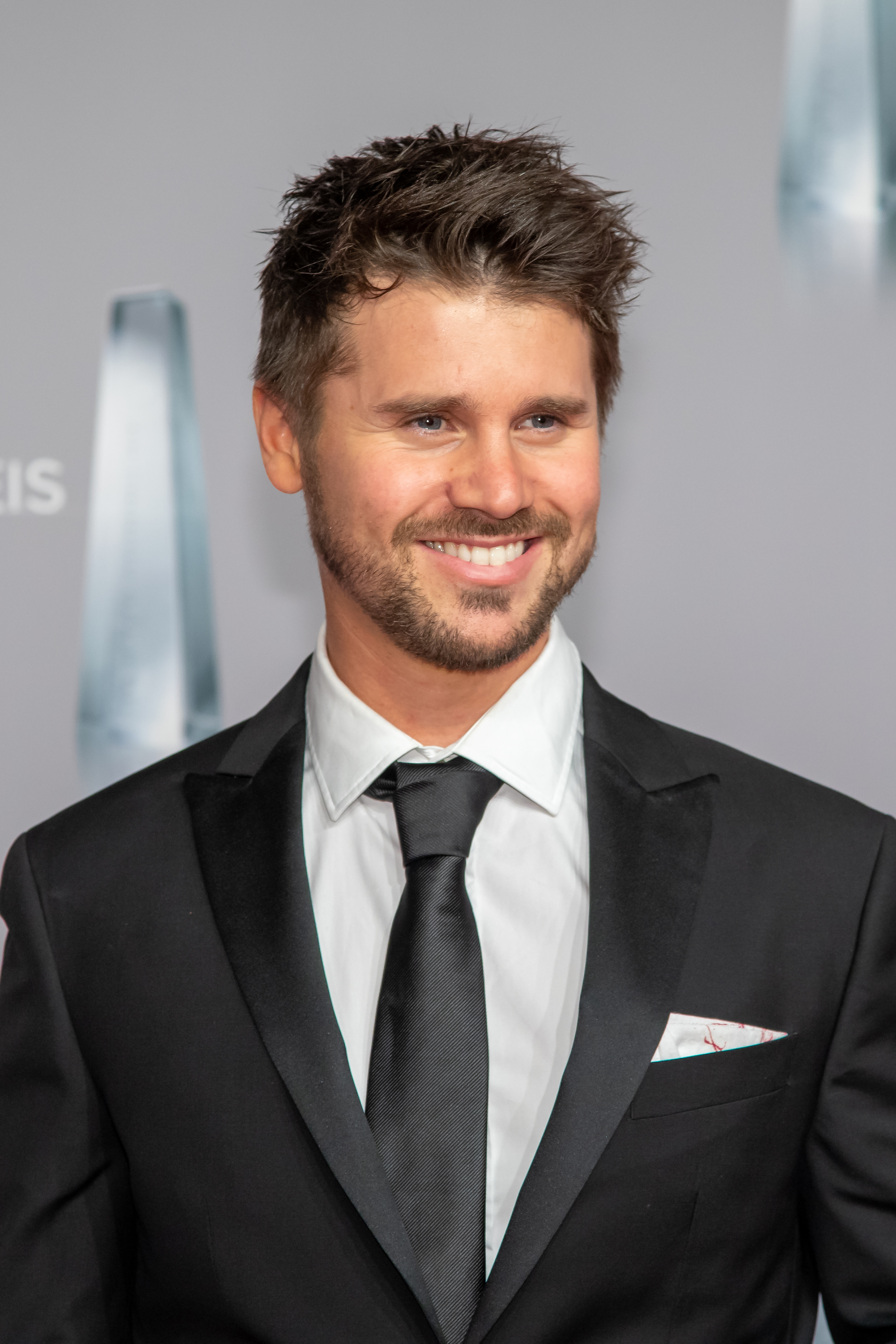
- Born: 26 September 1984 (age 42); Iserlohn, West Germany
- Occupations: Actor, television host
- Years active: 2004–present
- Spouse: Jana Julie Kilka (m. 2019)

Thore Schölermann (born 26 September 1984) is a German actor and television host.

== Career ==
Schölermann was born in Iserlohn, North Rhine-Westphalia. After graduation in 2004, he trained to be a professional actor at Palma de Mallorca, Spain. He then took part in a few short movies. He had lead roles in The Typewriter, directed by FM Croissant in 2004, followed by Unscrewed 2, directed by Florian Huber in 2005 and Butterfly Child, directed by Daniel Schmidt in 2006

In 2006, Schölermann took the part of Christian Mann in the soap opera Verbotene Liebe. After being cast in August, he first appeared on-screen on 27 November 2006. The role brought him international fame when Christian was paired with Oliver Sabel, played by Jo Weil. Christian and Olli became a phenomenon with fans all over the world. The couple was featured in many different stories together over the years, much to the producers fear of breaking up the couple.

Schölermann and his on-screen-partner Weil were judges on Mr. Gay World 2009.

In 2012, it was announced that Schölermann would take over hosting duties for The Voice of Germany from previous host Stefan Gödde. It was originally planned that his new work wouldn't affect Schölermann's work on Verbotene Liebe. However, his screen time got reduced and he then vacated the role on 7 December 2012 with Christian taking a job abroad. Online rumors indicated that Schölermann would return to the soap opera in early 2013, when the season finale of The Voice of Germany aired. These rumors turned out to be untrue as Schölermann's management made a statement that there are no plans of Thore Schölermann returning to Verbotene Liebe full-time. However, he would be open to a short stint if the production could schedule around his other engagements. In June 2013 he returned filming, with his on-screen return planned for September.

Instead Schölermann resumed co-hosting the tabloid news magazine taff. A position he took on in early 2012. Schölermann is now irregular seen as replacement for Daniel Aminati. In 2013, he also agreed to host The Voice of Germany spin-off The Voice Kids

Since January 2018, Schölermann hosts the German version of Get the F*ck Out of My House along with Julie Kilka.

== Personal life ==
In an interview, Thore stated that he was an animal lover and that he had several pets during his childhood, including a pig. He is a forester and a hunter. Hunting has been one of his favorite pastimes over the course of his life. Most of all Thore loves horseback riding, and is good at training horses, too. He has taken part in several riding competitions over the years.

He has a sister and a brother.

He is fluent in English.

In early 2010, Thore started dating Verbotene Liebe co-star Jana Julie Kilka. They got married on 29 August 2019, and in July 2021 they announced that they were expecting their first child.
