= Renée Weibel =

Swiss actress (born 1986)

- Born: December 23, 1986 (age 39); Bern, Switzerland
- Website: http://www.myspace.com/renee_weibel

Renée Weibel (born December 23, 1986, in Bern) is a Swiss actress.

Renée successfully completed her education as a stage dancer in 2003, as well as attending acting school in Berlin between 2006 and 2009. Her first stage appearance was in 2003 and she has had roles in notable plays such as Swan lake and The Phantom of the Opera. Alongside her career on stage, Renée has had parts in two short films: Uncut! in 2008 and Success in 2009.

She made her next move with taking the contract role as Helena von Lahnstein in the popular German soap opera Verbotene Liebe (Forbidden Love). Renée made her on-screen debut on October 5, 2009.

For years, Renée lived in Berlin. She had to move for her role in Verbotene Liebe, which is filmed in Cologne.

Next to German, Renée speaks American English and French. In 2012, she began dating her Verbotene Liebe co-star Dirk Moritz.
