= Thomas Gumpert =

German actor (1952–2021)

Thomas Gumpert (11 December 1952 – 7 January 2021) was a German actor who was best known for his role of Johannes von Lahnstein in the daily soap Verbotene Liebe.

== Life ==
Gumpert was born in 1952 in the East German city of Lauchhammer, in Bezirk Cottbus. He studied acting from 1972 to 1976 in Leipzig. Since 1972 Thomas Gumpert played many roles at the Deutschen Nationaltheater in Weimar. He also played in Berlin, Hamburg, Dortmund and Frankfurt. Since the mid 1970s he was also a prolific TV and film actor.

From 2003 to 2008 he played the role of the patriarch Johannes von Lahnstein in the soap opera Verbotene Liebe.

Gumpert died on 7 January 2021, aged 68 after a short illness and he was buried at the Stahnsdorf South-Western Cemetery. He was married to Volker Gumpert-Rosin.

== Film ==
- Lotte in Weimar (1974)
- Looping (1975)
- Addio piccola mia (1979)
- Coming Out (1989)
- Rückkehr aus der Wüste (1990)
- Von Wegen (2002)

== TV series and films ==
- Jäckis Liebe (1978)
- Fußballfans (1981)
- Martin Luther (1983)
- Front ohne Gnade (1983)
- Klassenkameraden (1984)
- Wilhelm von Humboldt (1985)
- Kopf und Herz (1986)
- Polizeiruf 110 (1986)
- Lindenstraße (1989)
- Stadtklinik (1997)
- Schwanger in den Tod (1997)
- Die Wache (1998, 1999, 2000)
- Der Clown (1998)
- Alarm für Cobra 11 (1999, 2001)
- Sex oder Liebe (2000)
- Die 8. Todsünde (2001)
- Im Namen des Gesetzes (2001)
- Null auf Null (2001)
- Wolffs Revier (2001)
- Vanessa Kramer (2002)
- Crazy Race I (2003)
- Die Cleveren (2003)
- Verbotene Liebe (2003–2008)
- Ohne Worte (2004)
- Siebenstein (2005)
