= Sina-Valeska Jung =

German actress (born 1979)

- Born: 17 June 1979 (age 46); Bad Nauheim, Wetteraukreis, West Germany
- Other names: Sina Valeska Jung, Sina Valesak-Jung

Sina-Valeska Jung (born June 17, 1979) is a German actress best known for her portrayal of Sarah Hofmann on the long-running German soap opera Verbotene Liebe on the German television channel Das Erste. Her first appearance was on 11 July 2006. Prior to appearing on Verbotene Liebe, she performed on the short-lived RTL Comedy Show, Comedy Nacht.

She was in a relationship with American musician Jared Hasselhoff of the Bloodhound Gang from 2006–2012. Jared guest-starred as himself in two episodes of Verbotene Liebe which aired on 23–24 June 2008. In 2010 their child was born.
