= Alexander Radszun =

German actor (born 1952)

- Born: 6 May 1952 (age 74); West Berlin, West Germany
- Occupation: Actor
- Years active: 1975-present

Alexander Radszun (born 6 May 1952) is a German actor. He appeared in more than ninety films since 1975.

== Selected filmography ==
Film
Year	Title	Role	Notes
1975	Everyone Dies Alone	Otti Quangel	
1982	The Magic Mountain	Joachim Ziemssen	
1985	Kaminsky	Dieter Stecker	
1988	The Boss from the West	Harry	TV film
1990	Dr. M	Engler	
2011	Kung Fu Mama	Heinrich Husen	

TV
Year	Title	Role	Notes
1988-1994	Eurocops	Christian Merian	
