= Hans Peter Hallwachs =

German television actor (1938–2022)

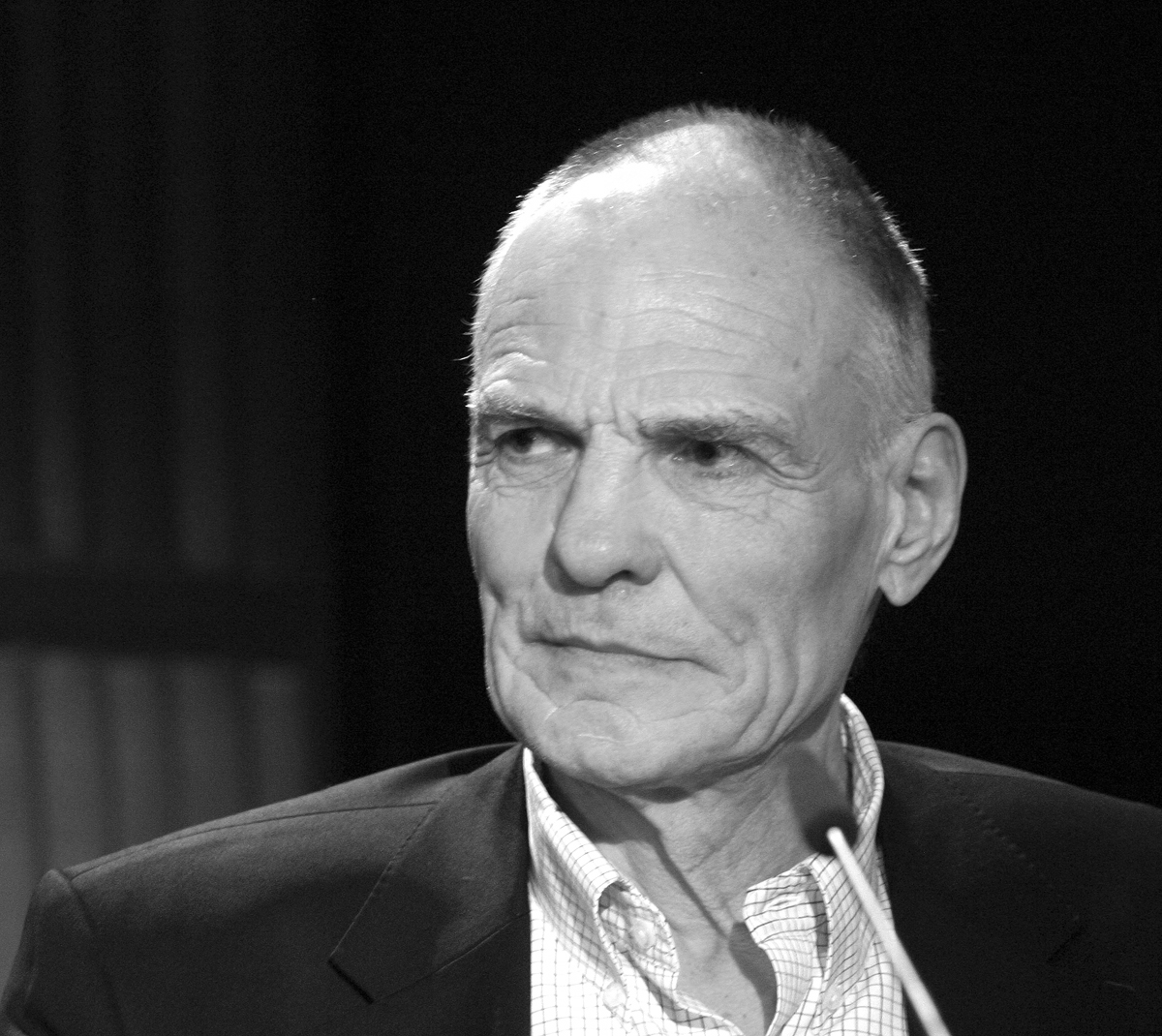
Hallwachs in 2008

Hans Peter Hallwachs (10 July 1938 – 16 December 2022) was a German actor.

Hallwachs was born in Jüterbog, Brandenburg on 10 July 1938. He died on 16 December 2022, at the age of 84.

== Selected filmography ==
- Degree of Murder (1967)
- Tamara (1968)
- Slap in the Face (1970)
- Tatort: Taxi nach Leipzig (1971, TV)
- Ferdinand Lassalle (1972, TV film)
- The Stuff That Dreams Are Made Of (1972)
- Ein ganz perfektes Ehepaar (1974)
- Tatort: Das stille Geschäft (1977, TV)
- Halbe-Halbe (50/50, 1977)
- Fabian (1980)
- Ich bin dein Killer (1982)
- Am Ufer der Dämmerung (The Edge of Darkness, 1983)
- Tatort: Freiwild (1984, TV)
- The Summer of the Samurai (1986)
- Die Stunde des Léon Bisquet (1986, TV film)
- Das Go! Projekt (1986, TV film)
- Boundaries of Time: Caspar David Friedrich (1986)
- Wanderungen durch die Mark Brandenburg (1986, TV miniseries)
- Didi auf vollen Touren (Didi Drives Me Crazy, 1986)
- Fatherland (1986)
- Wann, wenn nicht jetzt (1987)
- Derrick - Season 15, Episode 6: "Da läuft eine Riesensache" (1988, TV)
- Hemingway (1988, TV miniseries)
- Otto: The Alien from East Frisia (1989)
- Ende der Unschuld (1991, TV film)
- Nie im Leben (1991)
- A Demon in My View (Der Mann nebenan, 1992)
- The Great Bellheim (1993, TV miniseries)
- Wehner – die unerzählte Geschichte (1993, TV film)
- Rotwang Must Go! (1994)
- Der Bulle von Tölz (1996–1998, TV series)
- Der Mann ohne Schatten (1996, TV series)
- Desert of Fire (1997, TV miniseries)
- At Fifty Men Kiss Differently (1999, TV film)
- Alles Bob! (1999)
- La Passion Schliemann (2000, TV film)
- Hostile Takeover (2001)
- As Far as My Feet Will Carry Me (2001)
- Der Ärgermacher (The Troublemaker, 2003)
- Tage des Sturms (2003, TV film)
- Rosenstrasse (2003)
- Die Stunde der Offiziere (The Hour of the Officers, 2004, TV film)
- Traumschiff Surprise – Periode 1 (2004)
- Mord mit Aussicht (2008–2014)
- The Eremites (2016)
