= Joscha Kiefer =

German actor (born 1982)

- Born: 8 December 1982 (age 43); Müllheim, Baden-Württemberg, West Germany
- Spouse: Kristina Dörfer (2012–present) (one child)
- Website: http://www.myspace.com/joschakieferinfo

Joscha Kiefer (born 8 December 1982) is a German actor and best known for his role as Dominik Morgenstern on the series Soko München.

== Career ==
He studied acting for three years in Stuttgart. In 2005 Joscha was seen on the Das Erste-Show Ein Fall für B.A.R.Z.. One year later he had the main role in the motion picture Locked. He played theater from 2004 to 2006.

=== Verbotene Liebe ===
Kiefer joined the cast of the soap opera Verbotene Liebe (Forbidden Love) in fall 2007 as Sebastian von Lahnstein, nephew of patriarch Johannes von Lahnstein. He first appeared on-screen on 26 November 2007. Soon Sebastian got involved with Lydia Brandner, which became a major love story of the show in 2008. However, reviews of the pairing were mixed. After a one-night stand with Lydia's mother Katja—in true soap style—vixen Olivia Schneider became interested in Sebastian. A triangle between Lydia, Sebastian and Olivia was created which ended with Lydia and Sebastian as the only possible outcome despite chemistry between Olivia and Sebastian. Olivia was played by Kristina Dörfer, who would later become Joscha's wife and mother of his daughter Julie Marie. In 2009, Kiefer decided not to renew his contract with the show and left Verbotene Liebe after two years. The role was recast with actor Sebastian Schlemmer taking the role.

=== SOKO 5113 ===
Eventually, Kiefer became part of the long-running crime drama SOKO 5113 in the newly created role of Dominik Morgenstern. He first appeared in the show's 36th season in the episode "Der Fluch des Osiris", which aired on 15 November 2010. Kiefer is currently in its fourth season with the show. In 2013, Kiefer was also part of a crossover between other shows of the SOKO brand, which was titled SOKO - Der Prozess (SOKO: The trial) and ran as a five-part miniseries for an entire week. However Kiefer took only part in the first of the five episodes.

== Private life ==
Joscha Kiefer is happily married to fellow actress Kristina Dörfer, who he met on the set of Verbotene Liebe. They have a daughter, Julie Marie, who was born in September 2010. The couple married after three years of dating in December 2012. They live together in Munich since Kiefer joined SOKO 5113.

== Filmography ==
- 2005: fabrixx
- 2005: Ein Fall für B.A.R.Z.
- 2006: Locked
- 2007: Kurzschluss der Sonnen
- 2007: Lichtzeichenwechsel
- 2007–2009: Verbotene Liebe (Forbidden Love) as Sebastian Graf von Lahnstein #1 Episodes 3056–3484
- 2009: Stumme Spiegel
- 2009: Stillleben
- since 2010: SOKO 5113
- 2011: Hubert und Staller
- 2011: Um Himmels Willen
- 2012: Um Himmels Willen
- 2013: SOKO - Der Prozess (part one only)
- 2014: Die Kinder meiner Schwester
- 2015: Udo Honig - Kein schlechter Mensch
- 2015: Der Bergdoktor
- 2015: Nobbie Vazquez
- 2018: Die Braut meines Bruders
- 2020: Alarm für Cobra 11 - Abgründe
- 2020: Alarm für Cobra 11 - Ein langer Weg
- 2020: Das Haus
- 2020: WaPo Bodensee
- 2020: Soko München - Der Countdown
- 2020: Breisgau

== Theatre ==
- 2004: Fuchsquartett (AK Stuttgart)
- 2005: Vorstadtträume (Kulturhaus Schwanen, Stuttgart)
- 2006: Der nackte Wahnsinn (Theater im Olgaeck, Stuttgart)
- 2006: Die Kleinbürgerhochzeit (AK Stuttgart)

== Notes ==
- Joscha Kiefer Agency
- Joscha Kiefer in Verbotene Liebe
- Joscha Kiefer at IMDb
