= Kung Fu Mama – Agentin mit Kids =

2011 film

- Genre: Adventure
- Written by: Derek Meister
- Directed by: Simon X. Rost
- Starring: Claudia Hiersche; Ben Braun; Alexander Radszun; Bernhard Schir; Masha Tokareva
- Original language: German

Production
- Editor: Martin Rahner

Original release
- Release: 2011

Kung Fu Mama – Agentin mit Kids is a 2011 German action television film directed by Simon X. Rost. The film stars Claudia Hiersche as Nina Wenzel, as a Secret Service Agent, Ben Braun as her neighbor and a cool biker.

== Plot ==
She was the most powerful weapon in the German Secret Service armory. Nina Wenzel's (Claudia Hiersche) greatest success was arresting the international arms smuggler Wolf Geiger (Bernhard Schir). But when her sister dies, the top agent's life changes totally: she quits, takes in her sister's three kids and looks after them lovingly. Now, five years on, Geiger is due to stand trial, but the unscrupulous gun runner makes a spectacular escape. Nina's former boss Heinrich Husen (Alexander Radszun) sees only one hope, his best undercover agent must return to active service. After initially hesitating, Nina agrees, but juggling raising kids and the secret service takes all she has got. She cannot blow her cover whatever happens, which makes the budding romance between Nina and her neighbor Ruby (Ben Braun), a cool biker, extremely complicated.

== Cast ==
- Claudia Hiersche as Nina Wenzel
- Ben Braun as Ruby
- Alexander Radszun as Heinrich Husen
- Bernhard Schir as Wolf Geiger
