= Sebastian Schlemmer =

German actor (born 1978)

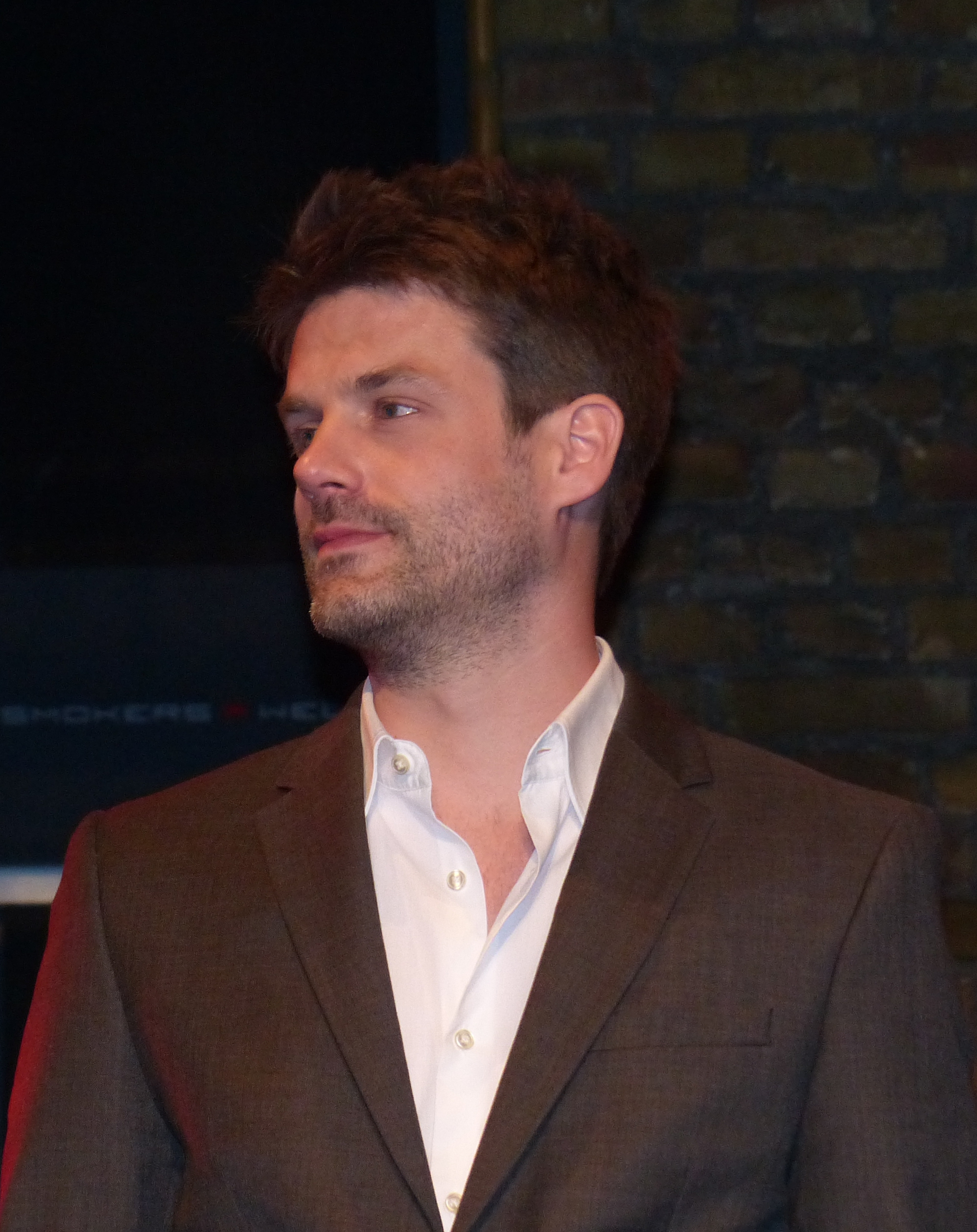
- Sebastian Schlemmer, 18. Jahre Verbotene Liebe Party, Düsseldorf, in 2013
- Born: Sebastian Schlemmer; November 6, 1978 (age 46); Euskirchen, North Rhine-Westphalia, West Germany
- Occupation: Actor
- Years active: 2000-present

Sebastian Schlemmer is a German actor and well known for his role of Sebastian von Lahnstein in the soap opera Verbotene Liebe (Forbidden Love).

Before his television career, Schlemmer appeared on several plays on the theater since 2000. He mostly was part of the theater scene in and around Cologne. Sebastian's most famous part was the role of Benjamin in the play adaption to The Graduate. He lasted on the play for two years, from 2007 to 2009.

In 2003, Schlemmer started out in a commercial and being part of several short movies in the following two years. It was in 2007 when he first came in contact with Verbotene Liebe. Sebastian Schlemmer was cast in a minor recurring role as a character named Florian Müller. One year later, he was part of the casting show Bully sucht die starken Männer for the role of Tjure. After guest roles on the action series 112 – Sie retten dein Leben and sketch comedy 4Singles, Schlemmer returned to Verbotene Liebe. He was recast in the role of Sebastian von Lahnstein, a part a took over from fan-favorite Joscha Kiefer, after he decided to leave the show after two years.
