= Claudia Hiersche =

German actress

- Born: Claudia Hiersche; 22 February 1977 (age 49); Frankfurt (Oder), East Germany
- Other names: Claudia Langner
- Occupation: Actress / Model
- Website: claudiahiersche.de

Claudia Hiersche (born 22 February 1977 in Frankfurt (Oder), German Democratic Republic (now Federal Republic of Germany)) is a German host and actress and is well known for her portrayal of the lesbian fictional character Carla von Lahnstein in the soap opera Verbotene Liebe (Forbidden Love), where she was on contract status between 2003 and 2009.

She attended a drama school in Manhattan for three months. Before her work on Verbotene Liebe, she was the host of the travel magazine television show Wolkenlos from 2000 to 2002. In 2003, Claudia also starred in the movie Schwer verknallt as a character, once again, named Carla.

As for her character in Verbotene Liebe she became very popular when her character Carla had a relationship with Hanna Novak. In 2006, Carla was the second lesbian character on German soap opera to marry another woman. (The first was Billi Vogt, who married her girlfriend Andrea on German soap opera Marienhof in 2002.)

== Personal life ==
Claudia had to abruptly leave within 24 hours to West Germany, due to her father wanting to start an independent newspaper.

== Filmography ==
Year	Type	Role
2000	Wolkenlos	Herself
2003–2009	Verbotene Liebe	Carla von Lahnstein
2011	Kung Fu Mama	Nina Wenzel
