= Miriam Lahnstein =

German actress and psychologist

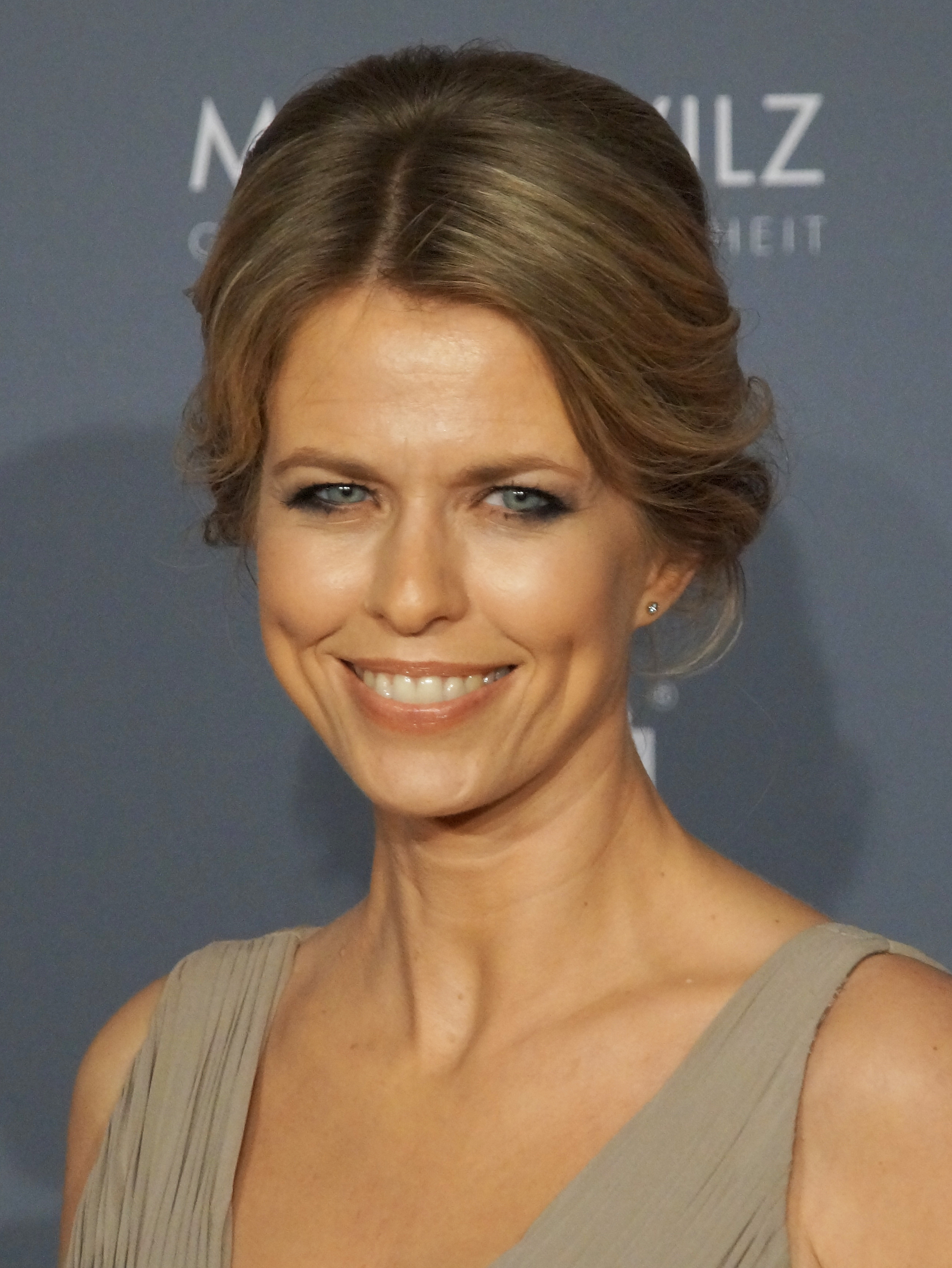
- Miriam Lahnstein in 2016
- Born: 9 August 1974 (age 50); Düsseldorf, West Germany
- Occupations: Actress; Psychologist
- Years active: 1995–present
- Notable work: Verbotene Liebe

Miriam Lahnstein (born 9 August 1974 in Düsseldorf, West Germany) is a German actress and psychologist.

== Career ==
Lahnstein portrayed villainess Tanja von Lahnstein on the Das Erste soap opera Verbotene Liebe from 1995 until 1998, reprising the role briefly in 2001. She rejoined the show from April 2004 to March 2007, when she left the series because of her second pregnancy. She returned later in 2007 and remained on the series until its cancellation in 2015. Lahnstein reprised the role in the 2020–2021 TVNOW revival series, Verbotene Liebe: Next Generation.

From 2003 to 2004, Lahnstein played Sabine Huber in the soap opera Marienhof. She has also made guest appearances in several popular German television series.

== Filmography ==
- Verbotene Liebe (Forbidden Love) (soap opera, 1995–1998, 2001, 2004–2015), as Tanja von Lahnstein
- Alles Bob! (romantic comedy, 1999), as Claudia
- Marienhof (soap opera, 2004), as Sabine Huber
- Die Pfefferkörner (teen-crime TV series, 2001–2004), as Jacqueline
- Verbotene Liebe: Next Generation (soap opera, 2021). as Tanja von Lahnstein

== Reception ==
Greta Sophie Matthias of TV Movie wrote, "Miriam Lahnstein in the role of her aristocratic namesake Tanja von Lahnstein shaped the series like no other and became an unforgettable TV face with her witty intrigues." In 2011, Lahnstein was nominated for a German Soap Award for Best Actress in a Daily Soap, and was nominated for Best Villain in 2012.
