= Jens Hartwig =

German actor (born 1980)

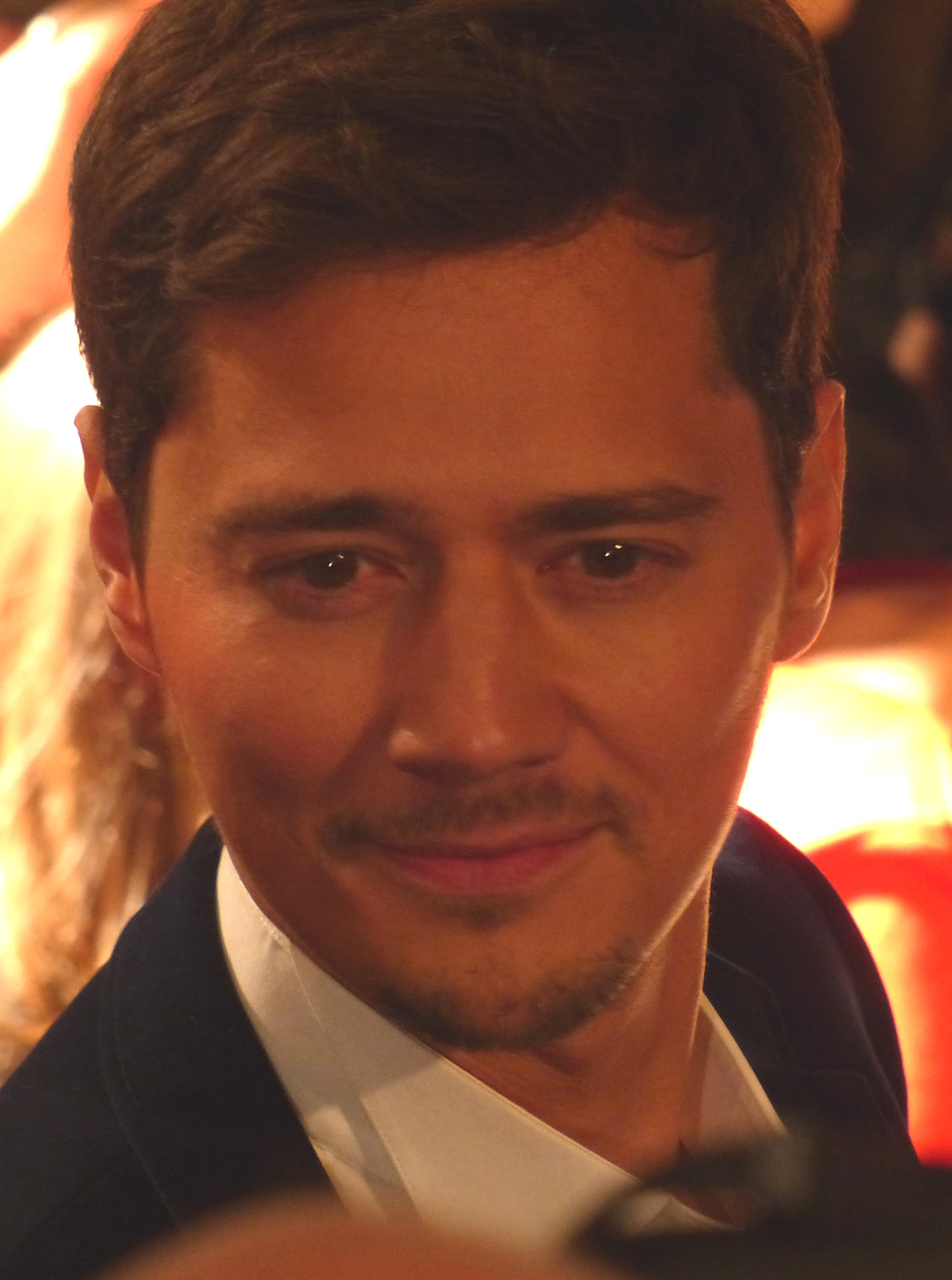
- Jens Hartwig, 18. Jahre Verbotene Liebe Party, Düsseldorf
- Born: April 16, 1980 (age 46); Bonn, North Rhine-Westphalia, West Germany
- Website: http://www.jenshartwig.com

Jens Hartwig (born April 16, 1980) is a German actor.

Jens completed successfully his education as in actor in the Center for Film and Television in Cologne. He appeared first in a secondary role as Georg Kramer in the feature film Eine indiskrete Reise (An indiscreet journey) in 2004. In the following years, Hartwig was seen in guest appearances in the sitcom Mein Leben & Ich as Karl and in the soap opera Unter uns as Stefan Metzger. In 2009, he was part of the ensemble of the sketch comedy Broken Comedy, produced by ProSieben as a web show. Over the years, Jens Hartwig also followed the occupation as a stage actor and was seen in plays such as Inkheart, The Storm and The Process. In August 2009, he took the contract role as Tristan von Lahnstein in the popular soap opera Verbotene Liebe (Forbidden Love). Jens appeared for the first time on-screen on October 23, 2009.

As well as his first language German, he also speaks English and French.

Jens Hartwig currently lives in Cologne, where Verbotene Liebe is filmed.
