= Jo Weil =

German actor (born 1977)

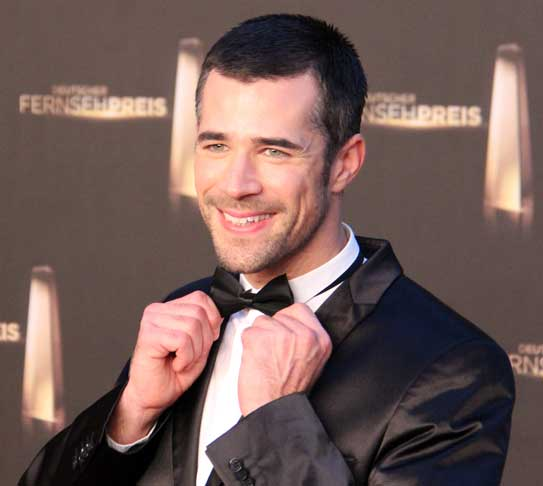
- Jo Weil arrives at the 2012 German Television Awards in Cologne
- Born: Johannes Hermann Bruno Anton Weil; 29 August 1977 (age 48); Frankfurt, Hesse, West Germany
- Occupation: Actor
- Years active: 1996–present
- Television: Verbotene Liebe, Rote Rosen, Alles was zählt, Medicopter 117, Die Rosenheim Cops
- Website: joweil.com

Johannes "Jo" Hermann Bruno Anton Weil (born 29 August 1977) is a German actor, best known for his portrayals of Oliver Sabel on the long-running German serial Verbotene Liebe ("Forbidden Love") and titular bodyguard Frank Farmer in multiple productions of The Bodyguard stage musical in Austria, Germany and Switzerland.

In addition, Weil's career includes multiple leading and featured guest roles in both English- and German-language television, film and stage productions since 1996, the release of two music singles, and stints as a host/moderator for German television and online features.

== Early life and education ==
Weil is the son of a German business owner and a physiotherapist. He grew up in Fulda, West Germany, with a brother, Michael, who is three years younger and a lawyer, in Petersberg and finishing his high school education at the Freiherr-vom-Stein-Schule. After high school and community service, he attended drama school in Cologne and took private acting and singing lessons. From 1998 to 2006, he continued his education via stage workshops at the Arturo Drama School.

== Career ==
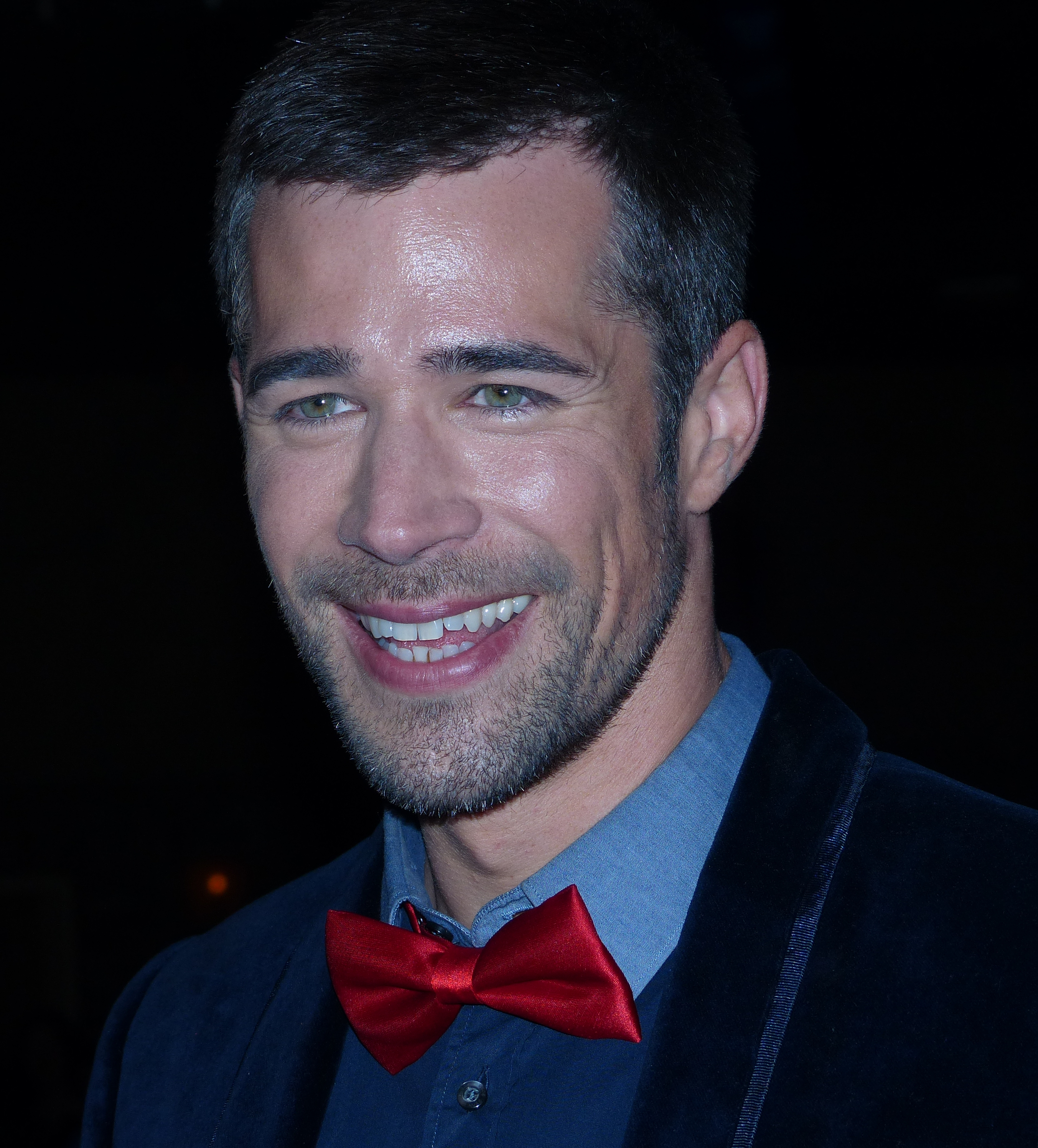
Weil at the 18th-anniversary Verbotene Liebe party in Düsseldorf

Weil has primarily worked as an actor, starring in German- and English-language television and stage productions. He has also worked as a model, fronting a series of popular calendars), television host/moderator, and voiceover artist.

In 2000, Weil started played a young bisexual waiter "Oliver Sabel", a lead role in the evening drama series Verbotene Liebe ('Forbidden Love'). Oliver later falls in love with his roommate Christian Mann (played by Thore Schölermann), and with whom he has formed one of the leading couples of the series since 2007. The impact of Christian and Oliver's story has spread outside Germany via the Internet (including YouTube), such as Brazil, the United States, Canada, Spain, China, and others countries, even though the series is not broadcast outside of German-speaking countries. They were also invited to attend Whistler in Canada for the Winterpride. He attended fashion shows and was in the jury for the election of the "Mr. Gay World ". From November 2007, Weil, after a five-year break, returned to the role of 'Oliver'. In September 2010, 'Oliver' marries 'Christian' in a church wedding. In 2011, he and co-star Thore Schölermann, won 'most beautiful lovers' award at the German Soap Awards and he won the 'Fan Price Male' award. He won another soap award, on 26 October 2012, he won 'Fan Prize Male' again at the Soap Award in Berlin, Germany. In August 2012, due to other commitments Thore Schölermann left the show, breaking up "Chrolli", as the couple was called by fans. He then left the show in February 2015.

=== Music ===
After he was unsuccessful with his 2002 released first single One More Try, a cover version of the same title by Timmy T from 1991. He presented on 31 May 2014, his second single Explosiv in the ARD show The Summerfest am See ('The Summer Festival on the lake'). The song is again a cover version, this time by Michael Morgan, who already released the song in 2002.

=== Hosting and reality television ===
In 2010, he participated in the cooking show The Perfect Celebrity Dinner by RTL Living's section channel.

In 2015, he wanted to set the world record in speed kissing in Cologne, as there were not enough women to beat the previous record set by Florian Silbereisen. 118 women missed a smooch within 60 seconds, but he did get to kiss 63 women in 30 seconds, impressing the record adjudicators.

Since August 2016, Weil presents Lifestyle with Jo Weil on the online channel Wirtschaft TV. Guests have included were Daniela Katzenberger, Thomas Rath (fashion designer), Kate Bosworth, Sıla Şahin, Kristina Bach and Hilary Swank.

In 2017, Weil participated with Mirja du Mont as a dance partner on the program Dance Dance Dance. From autumn 2018, he took over the role of Frank Farmer in The Bodyguard at the Ronacher Theatre in Vienna.

In 2009, Weil also began writing a featured column in the English lifestyle magazine reFRESH.

== Personal life ==
Weil lives in Cologne when not working elsewhere. Following 21 years of declining to comment on his personal life, he came out as gay in an interview with Bunte Magazine in April 2020, revealing he has been in a long-term relationship for more than a decade.

Weil has volunteered as a celebrity ambassador for the "Aidshilfe Köln" (AIDS-help Cologne), including the "Run of Colors", and has supported the "Puzzle of the Wishes" tour, which fulfills children's wishes nationwide and the "Aktion Tagwerk" campaign.

== Work ==
=== Film ===
Year	Title	Role
2004	Warten auf irgendwas (Short)	(unnamed role)
2011	Das Leben ist keine Autobahn	Chauffeur
2011	At Close Range (Short film)	Thomas
2016	Lula (Short)	Major Heinz Vollbracht
2017	The Toymaker	Nazi Officer Hermann Fegelein
2017	Sodom	Michael
2017	Gehen, wenn's am schönsten ist	Oskar Ehrlich

=== Television ===
Year	Title	Role	Notes
1997	Geliebte Schwestern ('Beloved sisters')	(unnamed role)	TV series, 1 episode
1999–2002, 2007–2014	Verbotene Liebe	Dirk Strohberg 1999 (2 episodes) / Oliver Sabel 2000-2015	TV series, 1,436 episodes
2006–2007	Medicopter 117 – Jedes Leben zählt	Sanitäter Florian Lenz	TV series, 18 episodes
2008	112 – Sie retten dein Leben	Andreas Klein	TV series, 1 episode
2008	In aller Freundschaft	Tobias Müller	TV series, 1 episode
2012–2014	Tatort	Toni Kelling	TV series, 4 episodes
2013–2017	SOKO 5113	Jonas Loibl (2017) / Sebastian Hofer (2013)	TV series, 2 episodes
2014	Koslowski & Haferkamp	Axel Steinbarth	TV series, 1 episode
2015	Alles was zählt	Nick Danne	TV series, 40 episodes
2016	Die Rosenheim-Cops	Roland Weber	TV series, 1 episode
2017–2018	Rote Rosen ('Red Roses')	Bodo Berger	TV series, 25 episodes

=== Stage ===
- Glück auf (2000)
- Gespenster (2004–2005)
- Bei Verlobung Mord (2006–2007)
- Ganze Kerle (Tough Guys) (2007–2009)
- Landeier (2013)
- Zauberhafte Zeiten (2015)
- Bodyguard - The Musical Vienna production (2018)
- Bodyguard - The Musical German-speaking tour (2019)
