= Jasmin Gassmann =

German actress (born 1989)

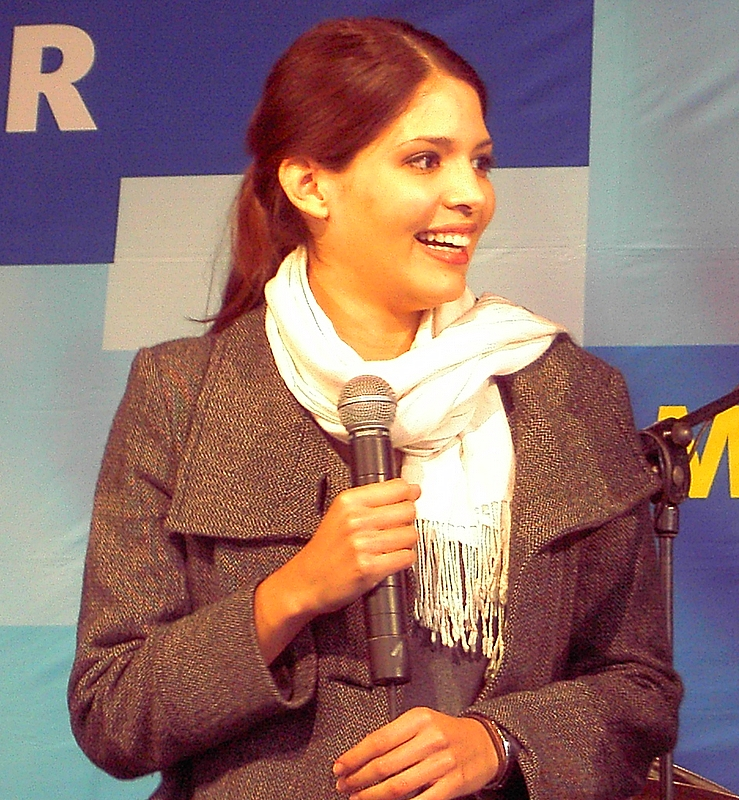
- Jasmin Lord in 2008
- Born: 6 November 1989 (age 37); Stuttgart, West Germany
- Occupations: Actress, film director
- Years active: 2008–present

Jasmin Gassmann formerly known as Jasmin Lord (born as Jasmin Gaßmann; 6 November 1989) is a German actress and film director of Colombian descent. She is well known for playing Rebecca von Lahnstein in German soap opera Verbotene Liebe. She played Ximena in the Croatian film about Ante Gotovina General, and in one episode of the related TV series, together with Goran Višnjić and Armand Assante.

== Filmography ==
- Ends meet (2008)
- Verbotene Liebe (2008–2011)
- Abrechnung mal anders (2011)
- Honeymoon Hotel (2012)
- Alarm für Cobra 11 – Die Autobahnpolizei (2012)
- Radio Silence (2012)
- Bible of Blood (2013)
- When Inge Is Dancing (2013)
- Rosamunde Pilcher: Evitas Rache (2014)
- Wilsberg: 90–60-90 (2014)
- Zazy (2016)
- Katie Fforde: The Silence of Men (2016)
- Katie Fforde: You and Me (2016)
- Vier gegen die Bank (2016)
- Nord Nord Mord - Clüver und die wilde Nacht (2017)
- Bullyparade - Der Film (2017)
- General (2019, Croatian film, starring with Goran Višnjić, Armand Assante, Zrinka Cvitešić)
- SOKO Stuttgart (2021–2025)
