= Markus Hoffmann =

German actor

- Born: 2 January 1971; West Berlin, West Germany
- Died: 16 January 1997 (aged 26); Berlin, Germany

Markus Hoffmann (1971 – 1997) was a German actor, most famous for his portrayal of Henning von Anstetten in the soap opera Verbotene Liebe.

== Career ==
After finishing high school and earning his Abitur, Hoffmann had an internship in a hotel and took acting lessons.

He spent two years in the US, during which time he worked in the television series Dynasty. His first role in German television was in 1993, in the series Auto Fritze on ARD. In 1994, he had a role in a soap opera, Die Fallers.

Hoffmann also worked as a voice actor, dubbing television shows such as The Waltons and The Cosby Show.

Beginning in January 1995, he played Henning von Anstetten, a charming playboy, in the German soap opera, Verbotene Liebe. In January 1996, he quit the show.

Hoffmann died on 16 January 1997 in Berlin, at the age of 26. The cause of death was suicide.
