= Clarissa von Anstetten =

- Verbotene Liebe character
- Isa Jank as Clarissa von Anstetten
- Portrayed by: Isa Jank
- Duration: 1995–2001, 2011–2013, 2020
- First appearance: Episode 1; 2 January 1995
- Last appearance: Next Generation Episode 1; 23 November 2020
- Created by: Reg Watson
- Introduced by: Ariane Krampe (1995)
In-universe information
- Other names: Clara Prozeski; Veronika Schwarz
- Occupation: Businesswoman
- Family: Prozeski; Von Anstetten
- Father: Gerd Prozeski
- Mother: Erna Prozeski
- Brothers: Walter Prozeski
- Husband: Peter Kaufmann (197?–1998); Christoph von Anstetten (1976–1998, 2000)
- Sons: Jan Brandner
- Daughters: Julia von Anstetten
- Stepsons: Henning von Anstetten
- Grandsons: Timo Mendes
- Granddaughters: Leonie Richter
- Nephews: Nick Prozeski; Ulli Prozeski
- Nieces: Jessica Prozeski

Clarissa von Anstetten (née Prozeski and formerly Kaufmann) is a fictional character on German soap opera Verbotene Liebe (Forbidden Love), portrayed by actress Isa Jank from 1995 to 2001, and again from 2011 to 2013. She reprised the role in the 2020–2021 revival series, Verbotene Liebe: Next Generation.

== Appearances ==
Isa Jank first appeared as Clarissa in the show's premiere episode on 2 January 1995, and left on 5 September 2001. She returned from 21 June 2011 to 21 March 2013. Jank reprised the role in the 2020–2021 revival series, Verbotene Liebe: Next Generation.

== Casting ==
The producers of show knew from the beginning, thanks to the Australian soap opera Sons and Daughters – which Verbotene Liebe was based on, what impact the character Clarissa would have on the show. They needed a strong and powerful actress in the role, who would click with viewers from the first scene. Isa Jank was eventually cast in the role and the producers soon saw that they succeed with the plan to find the right actress to play the role. She gave her debut in the show's premiere and for the prime years of the show became the main antagonist and center of Verbotene Liebe. Clarissa became known as the German Alexis Colby and made the show known as the German glamour soap opera.

In 1999, Clarissa's story was partly rewritten with the introduction of her ex-husband Peter Kaufmann. The story was not favored by fans nor Isa Jank herself. The actress began to have disagreements with the producers over her role and it ended in leaving the show only a little over a year after the Peter Kaufmann story was finished. Over the years, rumors of a comeback rose every know and then. In 2011, Jank agreed to return into the iconic role.

Her much anticipated return was publicly promoted with "the return of the bitch". But eventually fans got frustrated as it took almost six months to the final confrontation between Clarissa and Tanja. The rivalry after the confrontation was seen as partly childish and did not seem to have the old strength. Without any official conformation about an exit, Jank had her last tape day in December 2012 after a little bit more than one and a half-year on the show.

== Storyline ==
=== Background ===
Clarissa grows up in poor conditions. When she meets young architect student Arno Brandner, Clarissa falls for him and eventually ends up pregnant. Barely at legal age, Clarissa gives birth to twins, named Jan and Julia. As she doesn't know how to handle motherhood, especially with now two infants, Clarissa leaves Arno and her son Jan behind and decides to start a new life with her daughter Julia. Shortly afterwards, Clarissa meets the young and rich widower Christoph von Anstetten. He is fascinated by Clarissa and eventually ends up marrying her. Clarissa becomes a mother to Christoph's son Henning and more so a very rich and powerful woman.

Clarissa's back story gets rewritten in 1999, when a man named Peter Kaufmann claimed to have been married to Clarissa. She is supposed to have met Peter at a young age before meeting Christoph, which led to her first marriage to Christoph being invalid.

=== 1995–2001 ===
In January 1995, Clarissa is living her dream life. She doesn't have to worry about money and it seems as her daughter Julia is about to get engaged to medical student Gero von Sterneck. Clarissa's marriage to Christoph seems happy even though she makes no secret about having had several affairs to her best friend Charlie Schneider. Clarissa's life changes dramatically when she finds out that Julia has met her twin-brother Jan. The situation becomes even more difficult when unknowingly Julia begins to fall in love with Jan. Clarissa tries to keep Jan away from Julia and tells him the truth. Shortly afterwards Julia is diagnosed with leukemia and Jan just might be her only rescue. Clarissa hesitates to reveal her secret to safe her daughters life. When the truth finally comes out, the close relationship that Julia had to her mother is forever destroyed. As Christoph had no idea that Clarissa also has a son, the two face troubles in their marriage. Clarissa finds comfort in the arms of Arno, who has returned into her life as he wants to get to know Julia, while Christoph gets closer to Gero's mother Barbara.

Barbara becomes a rival for Clarissa in business as well as in her personal life. Clarissa uses every dirty trick in the book to ruin Barbara's business. But in the end, her schemes costs Clarissa her marriage to Christoph. She sees herself as a victim and promises Christoph and Barbara to make their lives a living hell. While making their lives complicated, Clarissa seems to have found a fair opponent in Tanja Wittkamp, who soon marries Christoph's younger brother Ben after a failed love triangle with Henning and Jan. But soon Clarissa has to realize that Tanja doesn't hold back, not even from murder. She kidnaps Clarissa and later threatens to kill her. When Clarissa finds out that Tanja is responsible for the murder of Cleo Winter, she puts Cleo's fiance Tim Sander in the right direction to get rid of Tanja for good.

As Clarissa decides to write a book about her glamours life as the wife of Christoph von Anstetten, Peter comes back into her life. He schemes his way to Clarissa's money and publicly humiliates her as an impostor. Christoph uses the information about Peter and Clarissa's marriage to make his marriage to Clarissa invalid. Clarissa later uses evidence for the innocence of Christoph's girlfriend Carolin in a murder case to blackmail Christoph into marrying her again. Realizing that he never can have the life he wants, Christoph commits suicide and shoots himself in front of Clarissa.

Clarissa is hunted by what happened to Christoph and blames herself for his death. She even goes into therapy and it takes Clarissa a while to find back to her old self. Right in time for Tanja's return. She escaped from Tim's imprisonment and is now out for revenge on Clarissa. She plots to marry Henning and then stage his murder as a disguised Clarissa. However Clarissa gets behind Tanja's plan and can warn her step-son. Tanja then escapes out of police custody and threatens Clarissa with a loaded gun in a plane, with which Clarissa wanted to take a much needed vacation. Clarissa gets her hand on the gun as the pilot announces that a storm is ahead of them. Henning later gets the news that Clarissa's plane went down with no signs of survival.

=== 2011–2013 ===
On 21 June 2011, Clarissa is revealed to be alive in Uruguay. She is about to be released from the prison where she has been for 10 years, wrongly convicted on drug charges. Clarissa is sure she was set up one last time by Tanja, who she believes is dead. Clarissa wants to start a new life and reunite with her estranged children, Jan and Julia. She soon finds her daughter Julia on the Spanish island Mallorca and pleads for her forgiveness. Clarissa also reunites with Arno and Charlie, who tell her that Tanja is alive and well, and owns Clarissa's old fashion company Ligne Clarisse.

As Julia starts to forgive her mother for her past mistakes, Clarissa finds out that Jan is on the island as well. Hoping for a big family reunion, Clarissa soon has to realize that the old feelings between Jan and Julia are still there. Julia's marriage to local doctor Ricardo Mendes starts to fall apart and she soon gives into her feelings for Jan, much to the shock of Arno and Clarissa. While Jan and Julia want to start a new life together, Clarissa can't let go of the past when she finds out that Tanja's still alive. Clarissa returns to Düsseldorf with the help of Ansgar von Lahnstein and shocks Tanja with being the new Co-CEO of 'LCL'.

Clarissa makes Tanja nervous and lets her know that she wants her company back. She looks at her best shot when Tanja is accused of attempted murder of head designer Sonja Jäger. Clarissa has proof that Tanja is innocent but holds it back to give Tanja a feeling what prison is like. She later offers the evidence to Tanja for her shares in the company. Tanja refuses at first but is later even willing to give in when the deal falls apart. Clarissa tells her the deal is off the table and that she hopes that Tanja rots in prison. When Tanja's husband Sebastian von Lahnstein is giving part of his liver to Clarissa's grandson Timo Mendes, Clarissa and Tanja have a heart to heart. Clarissa gives Tanja the evidence that can prove her innocence and they both try to be civil with each other.

When Ansgar comes up with a plan to get his hands on the family business, he gets Clarissa on board as his partner-in-crime. Clarissa confesses to Ansgar that she still wants 'LCL' for herself and is willing to do whatever it takes to get Tanja out of the company. Ansgar gives Clarissa prove that he simulated the collapse of the 'Lahnstein Bank', while Clarissa writes him over the name rights of 'LCL'. That way they both want to make sure that they don't betray each other. However, when Ansgar finally gets to be the head of 'Lahnstein Enterprises', he starts to see Clarissa as a problem. He hires a private investigator who steals the proof Clarissa has on him. That leads to Ansgar firing Clarissa from her position as Co-CEO of 'LCL'. Clarissa is outraged and while Tanja is named sole CEO of 'LCL', Clarissa wants back what's hers. She visits Ansgar and threatens him with a gun to get back the name rights to 'LCL'. In a fight over the gun, Ansgar is shot. He ends up being fine and is not contacting the police. Clarissa tells Tanja and Sebastian that the collapse of the bank was fake and then decides to leave town. She promises them that she will return and make revenge, then she left with her private driver to the airport.
