= Krystian Martinek =

German actor, writer and director (born 1948)

- Born: 5 April 1948 (age 78); Warsaw, Poland

Krystian Martinek (born 5 April 1948) is a German actor, writer and director.

Martinek completed successfully his education as an actor at the Schauspielschule Bochum. After that he played various stage plays in Bochum, Salzburg and Hamburg. He is known for his various roles in film and television. Krystian was seen in the cult-crime-drama Tatort, action-phenomenon Alarm für Cobra 11 and in a recurring role in the 80s hit-drama The Black Forest Clinic. Recently he joined the cast as Ludwig von Lahnstein in the popular soap opera Verbotene Liebe (Forbidden Love).

As a screenplay writer, he was responsible for various episodes of Das Traumhotel, Ein starkes Team and Da kommt Kalle.

Krystian Martinek lives with his wife, screenplay writer Hilly Martinek, and their children in Hamburg.
