= Verbotene Liebe =

German TV soap opera

- Verbotene Liebe title card
- Also known as: Forbidden Love (English)
- Genre: Soap opera
- Created by: Reg Watson
- Based on: Sons and Daughters
- Starring: Full cast
- Opening theme: "Forbidden Love" performed by The Wanderer
- Ending theme: "Forbidden Love" instrumental version
- Country of origin: Germany
- Original language: German
- No. of seasons: 20
- No. of episodes: 4,664

Production
- Producers: Rainer Wemcken; Guido Reinhardt
- Production locations: Cologne and Düsseldorf, North Rhine-Westphalia, Germany
- Running time: 25 minutes (1995– 2011); 40–50 minutes (2011–2015)
- Production companies: Grundy UFA TV Produktions GmbH (1995–2013); UFA Serial drama (2013–2015)

Original release
- Network: Das Erste
- Release: 2 January 1995 – 26 June 2015

Related
- Verbotene Liebe: Next Generation

Verbotene Liebe (pronounced [fɛɐ̯ˈboːtənə ˈliːbə], lit. "Forbidden Love") is a German television soap opera created by Reg Watson for Das Erste. The show was set primarily in the German city of Düsseldorf although, at times, the city of Cologne and the Spanish island of Mallorca figured prominently in the show's story lines. First broadcast on 2 January 1995, Verbotene Liebe was originally broadcast in 24-minute episodes, five times a week. It expanded to 45-minute episodes on 21 June 2011 and trimmed back to 40-minute episodes on 23 January 2012 to accommodate an adjusted time-slot. In 2006, Pay-TV network Passion began broadcasting episodes of the show from the beginning.

Verbotene Liebe was initially based on original story and character outlines from the Australian soap opera Sons and Daughters, the show was also slightly influenced by the American soap opera Ryan's Hope, before evolving into a show of its own as the series progressed. The show originally focused on two core families: the wealthy Anstetten family and the middle-class Brandner family. More specifically, it dealt with the story of Jan Brandner and Julia von Anstetten, two strangers whose fascination for each other leads them to fall in love, neither of them cognizant that they are twins separated by their parents. It is this story of forbidden love that gave the series its title. As cast members left the show, many characters were written out of the storyline, and new ones were added. Sometimes this included whole families. Writers attempted to phase out the dwindling Brandner family by introducing a new middle-class family, the Prozeskis, as foils for the wealthy Anstettens, but the Brandners proved to be too popular with fans, and the Prozeskis left as quickly as they came. Later, much of the drama centered on the Wolf family and the aristocratic Lahnstein family.

The series became well known for its groundbreaking positive representation of LGBT characters and relationships. For this reason, it became popular with gay and lesbian audiences in Europe and the United States. The series tackled controversial issues, such as: drug addiction, murder, rape, suicide, adultery, homophobia, incest, alcoholism, schizophrenia, HIV, miscarriage, kidnapping and sexual confusion.

In 2005, Verbotene Liebe received the Rose d'Or award for "Best Soap", and in 2010 was nominated for the category of "Best Soap or Telenovela". The show was nominated for eight German Soap Awards in 2011, winning three. In January 2011, the series began filming in high definition. The show ended on 26 June 2015, after 4,664 episodes and two decades after it began airing, due to a decline of viewers. The February transition to weekly broadcasting did not bring the number of viewers they had expected.

== History ==
=== Early storylines ===
Julia von Anstetten (Valerie Niehaus) and Jan Brandner (Andreas Brucker)

Based on the Australian soap opera Sons and Daughters, Verbotene Liebe premiered on 2 January 1995 on the German television channel Das Erste ("The First"). The remake was initially planned for RTL Television, another German channel, but executives there were skeptical that the concept of a love story between a brother and a sister could prove successful. Verbotene Liebe began with the story of Jan Brandner (Andreas Brucker) and Julia von Anstetten (Valerie Niehaus), a working class guy and a rich girl who meet randomly at an airport and are instantly attracted to each other. They fall in love, only to learn that they are actually twins separated at birth. Centered on the fictional high society in and around Düsseldorf and Cologne, Verbotene Liebe initially focuses on two contrasting families: the working class Brandners and the wealthy and aristocratic Von Anstettens. In addition to the star-crossed romance of Jan and Julia and their love story, characters like the twins' conniving mother Clarissa von Anstetten (Isa Jank) and murderous femme fatale Tanja von Lahnstein (Miriam Lahnstein) brought the series to prominence. At its height, Verbotene Liebe attracted three million viewers to tune in on a daily basis.

The cutthroat rivalry of Clarissa and Tanja begins when social climber Tanja sets her sights on Clarissa's stepson Henning von Anstetten (Markus Hoffmann). She pretends to be pregnant with his child so he will marry her, but Clarissa exposes Tanja as a fraud and a golddigger. Tanja vows revenge on the entire Anstetten family, and Clarissa's total destruction. Tanja murders her first two husbands, Ben von Anstetten (Andreas Jung) and his illegitimate son Rajan Rai (Sascha Zaglauer), and then kidnaps Clarissa. Her plans foiled, Tanja leaves town. Niehaus left the role of Julia in 1997, and the writers refocused the storyline on Clarissa. Her middle-class family, the Prozeskis, are introduced as another foil to the Anstettens, as many of the original Brandner family members had left the show. But the Brandners were too popular, and fans did not seem interested in Clarissa's origins or how she went about becoming a countess. Brucker also vacated the role as Jan in 1997. Even with her family gone, the focus remains on Clarissa as she is sent to war against her ex-husband Christoph von Anstetten (Jürgen Zartmann) and his new wife Barbara (Manuela Alphons). Tanja returns in 2001 with a plot to marry and murder Henning (now portrayed by Patrik Fichte) to inherit his fortune. She schemes to make him believe that his new love Marie von Beyenbach (Solveig Duda) is his sister, but Clarissa realizes Tanja's true plan and helps Henning and Marie outwit her. Clarissa and Tanja are subsequently presumed dead in a plane crash together. Lahnsten returned in 2004, followed by Jank in 2011.

In 2006, Sarah Hofmann (Sina-Valeska Jung) and Leonard von Lahnstein (Lars Korten) are in love, but learn they have the same father, Johannes von Lahnstein (Thomas Gumpert). During Leonard's wedding to Jana Brandner (Vanessa Jung), Adrian Degenhardt (Klaus Zmorek) reveals that he, and not Johannes, is Leonard's father. A further twist on the sibling love story was introduced in 2009 with mentally ill Tristan von Lahnstein (Jens Hartwig), who is in love with his twin sister Helena (Renée Weibel) and plots to have her all to himself.

=== Gay and lesbian storylines ===
Though homosexual relationships were not new in German soap operas, Verbotene Liebe featured many notable same-sex romances during its run. Julia's original fiancé, Gero von Sterneck (Broder Hinrichsen), turns out to be gay and has relationships with both men and women before Hinrichsen left the show in 1998. Introduced in 1997, young Ulrich "Ulli" Prozeski (Andreas Stenschke) is eventually featured in a coming-out story when he becomes romantically involved with medical student Tom Seifert (Kay Böger) in 1999. After Stenschke left the show in late 2000, Tom begins dating Oliver Sabel (Jo Weil). Six months later, in 2001, Ulli suddenly returns to town for a short stay that creates tensions between Tom and Oliver. Tom and Ulli are finally reunited with guest appearances in the show's 10th anniversary episode in 2005.

In 2006, Verbotene Liebe celebrated the first lesbian wedding in German television history between Carla von Lahnstein (Claudia Hiersche) and Susanne Brandner (Claudia Scarpatetti). The show later paired Carla with Stella Mann (Anne Wis), a relationship embraced by fans because the characters "were portrayed like the other couples on the show, including scenes showing their physical intimacy."

Verbotene Liebe received international attention in 2008 with the love story of Oliver Sabel and Christian Mann (Thore Schölermann). Weil and Schölermann were lauded internationally for their cliché-free portrayal of a same-sex couple, and Olli and Christian's 2010 marriage was the first church wedding between two men ever dramatized on German television. In 2013, Verbotene Liebe was called "a beacon of LGBT inclusivity on an international level" amid the popularity of Olli and Christian.

The final same-sex love story Verbotene Liebe created was the relationship between former music star Marlene Wolf (Melanie Kogler) and fashion designer Rebecca von Lahnstein (Tatjana Kästel). The story of this couple began in 2012 and garnered a sizable international following. In November 2013, AfterEllen ranked the Marlene and Rebecca as No. 14 and 15 in their "Top 25 Lesbian/Bi Characters on TV" list, as two of only three non-English speaking characters.

=== Arno's death ===
In 2012, original series character Arno Brandner (Konrad Krauss) is diagnosed with Alzheimer's disease. Das Erste announced, "Verbotene Liebe will be dedicated to the topic of dementia in detail in the coming months. How difficult such a diagnosis is for those affected and their relatives is portrayed in the soap in a sensitive and as real as possible way in order to sensitize the viewer to this widespread disease." Krauss's exit from the series was later confirmed by Das Erste. Bild called Arno the "figurehead" and "soul" of Verbotene Liebe. Krauss made his last appearance on 11 September 2012.

=== Cancellation ===
Rumors about a cancellation of the soap opera were first made back in the fall of 2010 after Verbotene Liebe and fellow soap opera Marienhof performed not well and Verbotene Liebe lost viewers a third year in a row. However, in February 2011, a decision was made about Das Erste's access primetime. Marienhof was canceled and Verbotene Liebe extended from 20 to 45 minutes. The ARD hoped that Verbotene Liebe could gain viewers again, brought back fan favorite - and original cast member - Isa Jank (Clarissa von Anstetten) and reintroduced the original story about siblings Jan and Julia; although the roles were recast. However the return of Jank's character was reviewed by most fans as underwhelming and the recasting of Jan and Julia got mixed reviews as well. Verbotene Liebe continued to lose in ratings and by 2014, the soap opera performed well under the market share of Das Erste.

On 17 July 2014, Bild was first to report that the show has been canceled. Online magazine DWDL later confirmed the report, saying they were able to name several more sources about the cancellation. The reports suggest that Verbotene Liebe is finishing its last year and airing into January 2015; long enough to let the show live through its 20th anniversary.

An official statement by Das Erste was made on 18 July 2014; confirming the cancellation. Director of Program Volker Herres said: "20 years ago, the siblings Jan and Julia made Verbotene Liebe a German series hit. Who could have guessed back then that VL, as the glamor soap was soon only be called, would have such a long breath? But eventually all shades of the forbidden and glamorous are told. It is then necessary to stop at the right time. And in our opinion this is now. As painful as it may be for the loyal fans of the series. But one thing is sure: Verbotene Liebe wrote television history." ARD coordinator of access primetime Frank Beckmann added: "With great dedication and impressive creativity, the team of Verbotene Liebe has shaped the access primetime for years. We know the strength of the brand and the importance of their loyal fans. Therefore, we consider whether we can offer Verbotene Liebe in another form at a later date." The statement also confirmed that the soap opera would be replaced by the game show Quizduell, which had been tested for four weeks in May 2014, and that Verbotene Liebe would air its series finale most likely in the beginning of 2015.

Rainer Wemken, CEO of UFA Serial Drama, shared the following statement hours after the ARD confirmed the cancellation: "The ARD has terminated the contract for Verbotene Liebe at this time. I regret this decision very much, especially because it is a series with a strong brand, with a large fan base that is also very popular on the Internet and achieves high polling numbers. We are therefore make offers to the ARD, how the series can continue - possibly with other production or broadcast models - at a later date. I therefore hope very much that we can continue Verbotene Liebe."

Only hours after rumors of the cancellation started, Verbotene Liebe fans opened a Facebook page and a petition to fight for the survival of the soap opera.

The remaining original cast member Gabriele Metzger (Charlie Schneider) and the show's matriarch Martina Servatius (Elisabeth von Lahnstein) opened up about the cancellation in a statement to Bild. Metzger received a mail about the cancellation. About her reaction the actress said: "I went into the garden, watered my lawn and cried." About the reason for the cancellation and the declining ratings, Metzger suggested that "look-wise, we have developed forward. But what makes a soap opera - exciting stories and characters with whom one can identify - moved into the background over the years." Meanwhile, Martina Servatius is criticizing Herres' statement about the cancellation that all stories are told: "That is nonsense. It was the desire of the ARD to extend the individual episodes from 20 to 45 minutes. We, the actors, have already feared then that this decision could break our necks. It's sad that the ARD twisted cause and effect in retrospect."

=== Sudden renewal and final cancellation ===
After over a month since the show was officially canceled, the Bild newspaper reports on 3 September 2014 that ARD might move ahead with a concept from the production company UFA to bring Verbotene Liebe back as a weekly series. The cast would undergo some changes to adjust to the new format and the production style of the show would change dramatically. The media-devoted websites Quotenmeter and DWDL.de agreed on the Bild report and suggested that official news about the future of Verbotene Liebe would be made in the upcoming days.

On 4 September 2014, official word broke that Verbotene Liebe would return as a weekly series in 2015 as soon as airing on the daily format has stopped. The network ordered 15 episodes and will air the weekly series Fridays at 6:50 PM. The show would introduce a new central character, Mila von Draskow, and still feature members of the Lahnstein family - namely Elisabeth, Ansgar, Sebastian, Tanja, Tristan and Rebecca, original character Charlie Schneider, the Helmke brothers and the younger set around Charlie's nephew Olli who were sharing a flat. Sets like the bistro Schneiders and the bar No Limits would also still be a part of the show. "There will be a new Verbotene Liebe with more shooting time, more opulent images and a dense plot. And yet the new look will still deliver intrigue, passion and great feelings - like many fans of Verbotene Liebe wished", said ARD coordinator of access primetime Frank Beckmann about the renewal.

The fifteen weekly episodes started on 27 February 2015 and lasted till 26 June 2015. The weekly season, which was called "Vergeltung" (Retribution) introduced new characters and a darker plot. Fans of the show widely criticized the new concept of the show and ratings ultimately turned even worse, leading to Das Erste canceling the show for good.

== Cast and characters ==
Verbotene Liebe initially centers on the working class Brandner family and the wealthy and aristocratic Anstettens, in particular the star-crossed romance between Jan Brandner (Andreas Brucker) and Julia von Anstetten (Valerie Niehaus). Jan and Julia turn out to be twins, the illegitimate offspring of Arno Brandner (Konrad Klauss) and Clarissa von Anstetten (Isa Jank). Conniving Clarissa soon finds a lifelong enemy in the murderous Tanja Wittkamp (Miriam Lahnstein), who first tries to marry into the Anstetten family, and then to destroy them. The series introduces the powerful Lahnsteins in 2003, led by patriarch Johannes von Lahnstein (Thomas Gumpert) and including his children Ansgar (Wolfram Grandezka), Leonard (Lars Korten), Carla (Claudia Hiersche) and Constantin (Milan Marcus). Sebastian von Lahnstein (Joscha Kiefer, later Sebastian Schlemmer), the son of Johannes's deceased brother, arrives in 2007 with an axe to grind against Johannes, who is presumed dead in a plane crash in 2008. Sebastian's siblings Rebecca (Jasmin Lord, later Tatjana Kästel), the twins Tristan (Jens Hartwig) and Helena (Renée Weibel), and later Hagen (Tom Viehöfer, Christoph Mory) are introduced, with their father Ludwig von Lahnstein (Krystian Martinek) revealed to be alive in 2009.

Original cast member Konrad Krauss (Arno Brandner) left the show in 2012 after 18 years, and Gabriele Metzger (Charlie Schneider) was the only remaining original cast member when the series ended in 2015. Others like Miriam Lahnstein (Tanja von Lahnstein), Jo Weil (Oliver Sabel), Dominic Saleh-Zaki (Andi Fritsche) and Wolfram Grandezka (Ansgar von Lahnstein) were considered long-serving cast members.

== Production ==
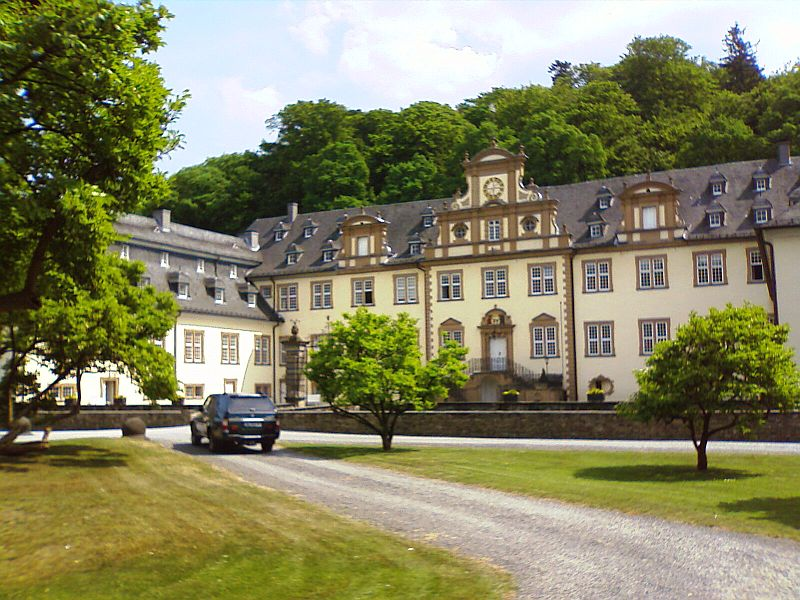
Ehreshoven Castle is used as the fictional Königsbrunn Castle in the series.

Verbotene Liebe centers on the fictional high society in and around Düsseldorf and Cologne. Initially, primary locations include Friedenau Castle, the residence of the affluent Anstettens; the Brandner home; and the bar No Limits (originally called Off Limits). Gut Schönberg, the home of the Beyenbachs, figures in the storyline between 2001 and 2003, succeeded by Königsbrunn Castle, home of the Lahnsteins. Dyck Castle was used for the exteriors of Friedenau, the Kitzburg for Schönberg, and Ehreshoven Castle for Königsbrunn.

The early years of Verbotene Liebe were produced in the studios of WDR. The show was produced in the Magic Media Company studios in Cologne's borough Ossendorf from 2003 until 2015. The same studios were also the home of the RTL soap opera Alles was zählt. For six months in 2011, the show was partly produced in Mallorca, Spain, for a separate story that eventually concluded in Düsseldorf.

== Broadcasting and ratings ==
=== Broadcasting ===
==== Television ====
VL German Broadcast History:

- 2 January 1995 − 30 December 2004: Mon−Fri 5:55 pm on Das Erste, approx. 23 minutes
- 5 January 1998 − 25 September 1998: Mon−Fri 9:03 am on Das Erste (episodes 1−171)
- 22 June 1999 − 30 December 1999: Mon−Fri 9.03 am on Das Erste (episodes 172−250)
- 3 January 2005 − 28 December 2007: Mon−Fri 5:50 pm on Das Erste, approx. 23 minutes
- 1 December 2006 – present on Passion (reruns; stylized as 'classics')
- 7 January 2008 − 20 June 2011: Mon−Fri 6:00 pm on Das Erste, approx. 23 minutes
- 21 June 2011 − 18 January 2012: Mon−Fri 6:00 pm on Das Erste, approx. 44 minutes
- 23 January 2012 – 7 June 2012: Mon-Fri 5:50 pm on Das Erste, approx. 38 minutes
  - 22 June 2011 – 11 June 2012: Mon−Fri about 8:00 am on MDR (previous day's broadcast)
  - 6 September 2011 – 11 June 2012: Mon−Fri 12:00 pm on EinsFestival (previous day's broadcast)
  - 23 March 2012 − 11 June 2012: Mon−Fri 6:40 am on NDR (previous day's broadcast)
  - 16 April 2012 − 11 June 2012: Mon−Fri 11:45 am on BR (previous day's broadcast)
- 11 June 2012 – 6 February 2015: Mon−Fri 6:00 pm on Das Erste, approx. 38 to 43 minutes
  - 12 June 2012 – 15 March 2013: Mon−Fri 6:40 am on NDR (previous day's broadcast)
  - 12 June 2012 – 21 March 2013: Mon−Fri 7:05 am on MDR (previous day's broadcast)
  - 12 June 2012 – 12 October 2012: Mon−Fri 11:45 am on BR (previous day's broadcast)
  - 12 June 2012 – 21 March 2013: Mon−Fri 12:00 pm on EinsFestival (previous day's broadcast)
- 27 February 2015 - 26 June 2015: Fridays 6:50 pm on Das Erste, approx. 42 minutes

In the beginning, Verbotene Liebe aired weekdays at around 5:55 pm on Das Erste and was followed by fellow soap opera Marienhof, creating a soap line-up for the network. The line-up proved successful in its early years and showed a lot of contrast. VL was labeled as glamor soap, while Marienhof showed the working-class of fictional district in Cologne. Becoming a huge success, Das Erste decided to show reruns in the early morning. With a break from about nine months, the network aired the first 250 episodes, who later were labeled as the show's first season.

After seven years on the air, the soap opera started slowly to lose viewers. Still a ratings success several cast changes seemed to hurt the show in the process. When Das Erste decided to change the airtime of both soaps, Verbotene Liebe (5:50 pm) and Marienhof (6:20 pm), particularly VL had now to challenge RTL's soap opera Unter uns, which ended at 6:00 pm. After two years, Das Erste changed the airtime again. Verbotene Liebe started around 6:00 pm and still provided the lead-in for Marienhof, which started around 6:25 pm again. In the meanwhile, the Pay-TV channel Passion started airing repeats in late 2006. However, the original airings of Verbotene Liebe and Marienhof continued to lose viewers and in late 2010 cancellation rumors started to surround fan bases. Das Erste eventually canceled Marienhof after over 18 years on the air and continued Verbotene Liebe, extending their episodes to 50 minutes with commercial breaks. The glamor soap served as the lead-in for various new crime dramedy series'. With the extension, VL now aired repeats on several ARD stations.

The line-up however was changed when the network signed Thomas Gottschalk and developed a new evening talk show for him. Gottschalk Live premiered in January 2012, causing Verbotene Liebe to lose about six minutes per episode and being a rival to Unter uns again. The talk show failed miserably and was canceled in June 2012. That led to the network changing the air time of Verbotene Liebe yet again. It was announced that the soap opera would return to its old time slot at 6:00pm. Fans complained about the several air time changes.

As of the end of March 2013, all local stations of the ARD stopped airing the previous day's broadcast of the show.

==== Online ====
In 2008, Grundy UFA worked out a contract with the video-sharing website Sevenload to make the first season of Verbotene Liebe, consisting the first 250 episodes, available online. Sevenload started with the first episode on 25 August 2008. After rumors about new contract, Grundy UFA and Sevenload ended their cooperation in the following year.

Das Erste started with its own video library, Das Erste: Mediathek, in May 2008 and airs extended previews, specials and new episodes (for seven days) of Verbotene Liebe.

Grundy UFA instead went into business with the video-on-demand platform Maxdome, which is owned by ProSiebenSat.1 Media. The first 800 episodes were made available for €0,99 per episode with a valid link for 48 hours. Maxdome also owns rights to new episodes, adding them right after television broadcast starting with episode 3400. With episode 3820 the show is available in high-definition.

In 2012, MyVideo became another provider for old Verbotene Liebe episodes. Under the label Verbotene Liebe classics are currently 360 episodes available for free. MyVideo and Grundy UFA plan to extend the video library to more than the first 1000 episodes of the show. Currently there isn't an official schedule when MyVideo plans on releasing more episodes.

=== Ratings ===
In the show's best years, Verbotene Liebe had three million viewers per episode, the second-highest rated soap opera behind Gute Zeiten, schlechte Zeiten, with a 16 percent market share overall. That all began to change in 2007, when the show began losing viewers. In 2008, ratings dropped dramatically as viewers became dissatisfied with recent casting changes and lackluster storylines. On 15 December 2008, only 1.57 million viewers watched the show. Producers reacted immediately and moved the storylines in a different direction. The 3333rd episode was seen by 2.18 million viewers and featured an elegant masked ball.

One year later, Verbotene Liebe faced rumors of cancellation, when Das Erste announced intended changes to the lineup. The show was revamped, and eventually it was lead-out soap Marienhof that went off the air in mid-2011. Verbotene Liebe was extended to an hour and took over Marienhof's problematic time-slot, resulting in a dip in ratings. The ratings got much worse in 2012, which again led to rumors that the soap opera might get canceled. Overall, Verbotene Liebe halved its ratings in the last five years.

Year	Timeslot	Network	Episodes	Viewers (in millions/overall)	Viewers (in millions/target group 14–49)	Market share (overall)	Market share (target group 14–49)
1995	Monday–Friday 5:55 pm	Das Erste	233	—	—	—	—
1996	Monday–Friday 5:55 pm	Das Erste	235	—	—	—	—
1997	Monday–Friday 5:55 pm	Das Erste	239	—	—	—	—
1998	Monday–Friday 5:55 pm	Das Erste	239	—	—	—	—
1999	Monday–Friday 5:55 pm	Das Erste	242	—	—	—	—
2000	Monday–Friday 5:55 pm	Das Erste	238	—	—	—	—
2001	Monday–Friday 5:55 pm	Das Erste	233	—	—	—	—
2002	Monday–Friday 5:55 pm	Das Erste	230	—	—	—	—
2003	Monday–Friday 5:55 pm	Das Erste	249	—	—	—	—
2004	Monday–Friday 5:55 pm	Das Erste	238	—	—	—	—
2005	Monday–Friday 5:50 pm	Das Erste	242	—	—	—	—
2006	Monday–Friday 5:50 pm	Das Erste	226	—	—	—	—
2007	Monday–Friday 5:50 pm	Das Erste	244	2.23	0.63	13,7%	10,8%
2008	Monday–Friday 6:00 pm	Das Erste	227	1.96	0.59	12,2%	10%
2009	Monday–Friday 6:00 pm	Das Erste	229	1.83	0.54	11,5%	9,3%
2010	Monday–Friday 6:00 pm	Das Erste	224	1.78	0.47	10,8%	7,9%
2011	Monday–Friday 6:00 pm	Das Erste	234	1.61	0.4	9,6%	7%
2012	Monday–Friday 6:00 pm	Das Erste	217	1.31	0.29	7,9%	5,3%
2013	Monday–Friday 6:00 pm	Das Erste	219	1.18	0.26	6,9%	4,6%
2014	Monday–Friday 6:00 pm	Das Erste	204	1.17	-	7%	4,6%
2015	Monday–Friday 6:00 pm	Das Erste	18	1.29	—	6,2%	3,8%
2015 (Retribution)	Friday 6:00 pm	Das Erste	15	0.99	—	4,8%	2,8%

== Specials ==
Over the years, Verbotene Liebe had several online specials, such as a weekly preview or cast interviews. However among them were also two online spin-offs:

=== Clarissas Tagebuch ===
Clarissas Tagebuch (English: Clarissa's Diary) is a 2011 five-part series that stars Isa Jank in her role as Clarissa von Anstetten. It chronicles much of Clarissa's past and shows that the character has been in a South American prison for the last ten years. The special aired before Jank would return on-screen on the main show.

=== Die längste Nacht von Königsbrunn ===
Die längste Nacht von Königsbrunn (English: The longest Night of Königsbrunn) is a 2014 fifteen-part series, set on a stormy night in the kitchen of Castle Königsbrunn. It stars Martina Servatius (Elisabeth von Lahnstein), Claus Thull-Emden (Justus Stiehl), Miriam Lahnstein (Tanja von Lahnstein), Sebastian Schlemmer (Sebastian von Lahnstein), Jana Julie Kilka (Jessica Stiehl), Jens Hartwig (Tristan von Lahnstein), Nicole Mieth (Kim Wolf) and as special guest stars Konrad Krauss (Arno Brandner) and Verena Zimmermann (Nico von Lahnstein). The special revolves around secrets of every character and concludes on 30 May 2014 with a live episode.

== Revival ==
In early 2020, the RTL Group obtained the rights for old episodes to stream on their premium streaming service TVNOW. Viewing figures were favourable and the RTL Group decided in June 2020 to order new episodes from UFA Serial Drama for the streaming service. The intentions of RTL were made public by a Bild report on 19 June 2020. RTL later confirmed the news, planning to start filming later in 2020. The media group also announced that several actors from the original series would be returning.

On 1 July 2020, it was reported that TVNOW ordered a 10-episode revival season, likely to air in a weekly rhythm starting in November 2020. The revival is set to focus on a new generation with few familiar faces in the world of fashion. The working title is Verbotene Liebe: Das Erbe (Forbidden Love: The Heritage). The concept for the revival orientates on dramas like Dynasty and Succession. The show was later renamed Verbotene Liebe: Next Generation, and aired from 23 November 2020 to 25 January 2021. Isa Jank (Clarissa von Anstetten), Jo Weil (Oliver Sabel), Gabriele Metzger (Charlie Schneider) Wolfram Grandezka (Ansgar von Lahnstein), Claudia Hiersche (Carla von Lahnstein) and Miriam Lahnstein (Tanja von Lahnstein) reprised their roles from the original series.

== Awards ==
=== German Soap Awards ===
- 2012 "Best Actor" Wolfram Grandezka (Ansgar von Lahnstein)
- 2012 "Fan Award Male" Jo Weil (Oliver Sabel)
- 2011 "Sexiest Woman" Jasmin Lord (Rebecca von Lahnstein)
- 2011 "Fan Award Male" Jo Weil (Oliver Sabel)
- 2011 "Most Beautiful Couple" Oliver Sabel and Christian Mann

=== Rose d'Or ===
- 2005 "Best Soap"

== Adaptations ==
Verbotene Liebe was adapted in Greek as Απαγορευμένη αγάπη (Romanized: Apagorevmeni agapi) and was broadcast between 1998 and 2006 in Mega Channel.

== See also ==
- List of Verbotene Liebe characters
- List of cast members of Verbotene Liebe
- Minor characters of Verbotene Liebe
- List of longest-serving soap opera actors
