= Isa Jank =

German actress (born 1952)

- Born: Isa Andersen; 16 August 1952 (age 73); Straupitz, East Germany
- Occupation: Actress
- Years active: 1968–present
- Spouse: Oliver Geißen (married 1995-2000)

Isa Andersen (real name Isa Jank) is a German actress best known for her role as Clarissa von Anstetten in the German soap opera Verbotene Liebe (Forbidden Love).

== Career ==
Jank began her acting career in Hollywood in the 1980s, acting alongside James Belushi in Real Men and performing other roles in Night Angel, Cheers and Airwolf.

In 1992, she accepted a role in the German legal drama Liebling Kreuzberg (Darling Kreuzberg).

Jank joined the cast of the German soap opera Verbotene Liebe as Clarissa von Anstetten in the show's premiere episode on 2 January 1995, and left on 5 September 2001.

Jank returned to television in October of 2005, in the role of Annabelle Gravenberg in the ZDF telenovela Wege zum Glück. Jank stayed with the telenovela for three years until her character died on-screen in November of 2008, shortly before the show ended.

Jank returned to Verbotene Liebe from 21 June 2011 to 21 March 2013.

In 2016, Jank became a housemate in the fourth season of Promi Big Brother.

Jank reprised the role of Clarissa von Anstetten in the 2020–2021 revival series, Verbotene Liebe: Next Generation.
