= Wolfram Grandezka =

German actor (born 1969)

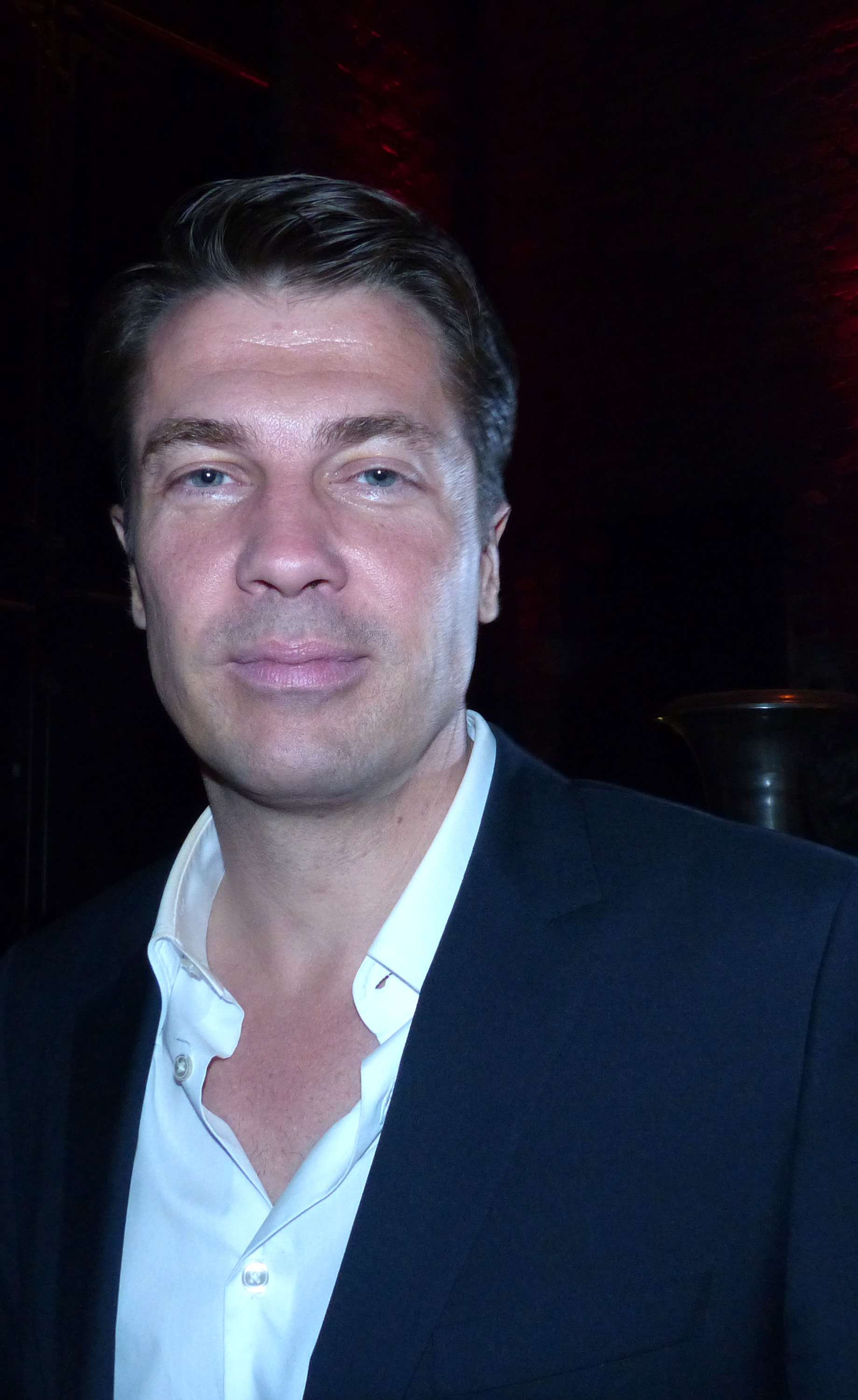
Grandezka in 2013

Wolfram Grandezka (born 17 December 1969 in Saalfeld) is a German actor.

He landed the role of Roman Klingenberg in the soap opera Unter uns, playing the role from 5 January 1998 to 26 April 2000. He came to another soap, Verbotene Liebe, four years later. He has played Ansgar von Lahnstein, a charming villain, since 22 January 2004. In Rote Rosen, he plays the womanising Gregor Pasch. In 2023 he appeared in Einspruch, Schatz! – Ein Fall von Liebe.

From 1999 to 2005, Grandezka was married to model Nadja Auermann and has a son with her.

== Filmography ==
- Unter uns (1998–2000), as Roman Klingenberg
- Verbotene Liebe (2004–2015), as Ansgar von Lahnstein
- Wilsberg: Callgirls (2006)
- Rote Rosen (2018–present), as Gregor Pasch
