= German Soap Award =

The German Soap Award began for the first time in 2011 as an event organised by mypromi.de and VIPshare Media for German Soap operas and Telenovelas. The awards started because more than 33 million viewers watch the series, yet its actors and actresses have barely been acknowledged, often overlooked in other award ceremonies, not taking their acting abilities serious. The Nominees in each category are chosen by a jury and then the winner of the award are determined by a vote on the Internet.

== German Soap Award 2011 ==
The first German Soap Awards held on 4 June 2011 at the Hotel Grand Elysée Hamburg. The event was organized by Sören Bauer Events from Hamburg. Protagonists of telenovelas and soap operas were nominated in eleven categories. Over 750,000 people took part in the voting. Pete Dwojak the former actor from Gute Zeiten, schlechte Zeiten presented the evening.

=== Best Daily Soap Actress ===
| Winner and Nominees | Role | Original Title | English Title |
|---|---|---|---|
| Anett Heilfort | Eva Zielinski | Eine wie keine | |
| Anna-Katharina Samsel | Katja Bergmann | Alles was zählt | All That Matters |
| Doreén Dietel | Trixi Preissinger | Dahoam is Dahoam | Home is Home |
| Heidrun Gärtner | Annalena Brunner | Dahoam is Dahoam | Home is Home |
| Isabella Hübner | Dr. Lisa Busch | Marienhof | |
| Joy Lee Juana Abiola-Müller | Michelle Fink | Unter uns | |
| Marie Zielcke | Manu Berlett | Eine wie keine | |
| Miriam Lahnstein | Tanja von Lahnstein | Verbotene Liebe | Forbidden Love |
| Sıla Şahin | Ayla Özgül | Gute Zeiten, schlechte Zeiten | Good Times, Bad Times |
| Susan Sideropoulos | Verena Koch | Gute Zeiten, schlechte Zeiten | Good Times, Bad Times |
| Tabea Heynig | Britta Schönfeld | Unter uns | |
| Tatjana Clasing | Simone Steinkamp | Alles was zählt | All That Matters |
| Verena Zimmermann | Nico von Lahnstein | Verbotene Liebe | Forbidden Love |
| Viktoria Brams | Inge Busch | Marienhof | |

=== Best Daily Soap Actor ===
| Winner and Nominees | Role | Original Title | English Title |
|---|---|---|---|
| Arne Stephan | Mark Braun | Eine wie keine | |
| Francisco Medina | Maximilian von Altenburg | Alles was zählt | All That Matters |
| Harry Blank | Mike Preissinger | Dahoam is Dahoam | Home is Home |
| Jens Hartwig | Tristan von Lahnstein | Verbotene Liebe | Forbidden Love |
| Patrick Müller | Tobias Lassner | Unter uns | |
| Prodromos Antoniadis | Oliver Gradmann | Eine wie keine | |
| Raúl Richter | Dominik Gundlach | Gute Zeiten, schlechte Zeiten | Good Times, Bad Times |
| Silvan-Pierre Leirich | Richard Steinkamp | Alles was zählt | All That Matters |
| Stefan Bockelmann | Malte Winter | Unter uns | |
| Thomas Drechsel | Max Krüger | Gute Zeiten, schlechte Zeiten | Good Times, Bad Times |
| Tommy Schwimmer | Florian Brunner | Dahoam is Dahoam | Home is Home |
| Tuna Ünal | Tarek Berisi | Marienhof | |
| Wolfgang Seidenberg | Frank Töppers | Marienhof | |
| Wolfram Grandezka | Ansgar von Lahnstein | Verbotene Liebe | Forbidden Love |

=== Best Telenovela Actress ===
| Winner and Nominees | Role | Original Title | English Title |
|---|---|---|---|
| Antje Hagen | Hildegard Sonnbichler | Sturm der Liebe | Storm of Love |
| Brigitte Antonius | Johanna Jansen | Rote Rosen | |
| Grit Boettcher | Gitti Sommer | Hanna – Folge deinem Herzen | |
| Janina Flieger | Vanessa Meyer | Lena – Liebe meines Lebens | Lena - Love of my Life |
| Jeanette Biedermann | Anna Broda | Anna und die Liebe | Anna and Love |
| Jenny Jürgens | Pia Sander | Lena – Liebe meines Lebens | Lena - Love of my Life |
| Luise Bähr | Hanna Sommer | Hanna – Folge deinem Herzen | |
| Mona Seefried | Charlotte Saalfeld | Sturm der Liebe | Storm of Love |
| Selina Müller | Luzi Beschenko | Hand aufs Herz | Hand on Heart |
| Ulrike Kargus | Lena Weller | Rote Rosen | |
| Vanessa Jung | Beate Vogel | Hand aufs Herz | Hand on Heart |

=== Best Telenovela Actor ===
| Winner and Nominees | Role | Original Title | English Title |
|---|---|---|---|
| Andreas Jancke | Michael Heisig | Hand aufs Herz | Hand on Heart |
| Christopher Kohn | Ben Bergmann | Hand aufs Herz | Hand on Heart |
| Dirk Galuba | Werner Saalfeld | Sturm der Liebe | Storm of Love |
| Joachim Raaf | Frank Sander | Lena – Liebe meines Lebens | Lena - Love of my Life |
| Max Alberti | David von Arensberg | Lena – Liebe meines Lebens | Lena - Love of my Life |
| Nicolas König | Tim Matthiessen | Rote Rosen | |
| Patrick Kalupa | Tom Lanford | Anna und die Liebe | Anna and Love |
| Philipp Langenegger | Robert Brinkmann | Hanna – Folge deinem Herzen | |
| Sascha Tschorn | Felix Siemers | Rote Rosen | |
| Sepp Schauer | Alfons Sonnbichler | Sturm der Liebe | Storm of Love |
| Simon Böer | Maximilian Castellhoff | Hanna – Folge deinem Herzen | |

=== Best Lovers ===
| Winner and Nominees | Role | Original Title | English Title |
|---|---|---|---|
| André Dietz and Ulrike Röseberg | Ingo Zadek and Annette Bergmann | Alles was zählt | All That Matters |
| Arne Stephan and Marie Zielcke | Mark Braun and Manu Berlett | Eine wie keine | |
| Christopher Kohn and Vanessa Jung | Ben Bergmann and Beate Vogel | Hand aufs Herz | Hand on Heart |
| Daniel Fehlow and Susan Sideropoulos | Leon Moreno and Verena Koch | Gute Zeiten, schlechte Zeiten | Good Times, Bad Times |
| Gabriel Merz and Maria Fuchs | Nils Ragar and Carla Saravakos | Rote Rosen | |
| Hendrik Borgmann and Sandra Koltai | Nicolas Stein and Antonia Stein | Marienhof | |
| Jacob Weigert and Josephine Schmidt | Enrique Vegaz and Mia Zeiss | Anna und die Liebe | Anna and Love |
| Jo Weil and Thore Schölermann | Oliver Sabel and Christian Mann | Verbotene Liebe | Forbidden Love |
| Lorenzo Patané and Uta Kargel | Robert Saalfeld and Eva Saalfeld | Sturm der Liebe | Storm of Love |
| Martin Wenzl and Teresa Rizos | Ludwig Brunner and Caroline Ertl | Dahoam is Dahoam | Home is Home |
| Max Alberti and Jessica Ginkel | David von Arensberg and Lena Sander | Lena – Liebe meines Lebens | Lena - Love of my Life |
| Miloš Vuković and Marylu-Saskia Poolman | Paco Weigel and Anna Weigel | Unter uns | |
| Simon Böer and Luise Bähr | Maximilian Castellhoff and Hanna Sommer | Hanna – Folge deinem Herzen | |

=== Best Villain ===
| Winner and Nominees | Role | Original Title | English Title |
|---|---|---|---|
| Andreas Hofer | Oskar Castellhoff | Hanna – Folge deinem Herzen | |
| Christian Buse | Thorsten Fechner | Marienhof | |
| Daniel Aichinger | Axel Schwarz | Alles was zählt | All That Matters |
| Guido Broscheit | Falk Landau | Rote Rosen | |
| Lee Rychter | David Darcy | Anna und die Liebe | Anna and Love |
| Nicola Tiggeler | Barbara von Heidenberg | Sturm der Liebe | Storm of Love |
| Philipp Romann | Philip Sachs | Eine wie keine | |
| Sebastian Hölz | Julian Götting | Hand aufs Herz | Hand on Heart |
| Stefan Franz | Rolf Jäger | Unter uns | |
| Urs Remond | Rafael von Arensberg | Lena – Liebe meines Lebens | Lena - Love of my Life |
| Wolfgang Bahro | Hans-Joachim Gerner | Gute Zeiten, schlechte Zeiten | Good Times, Bad Times |
| Wolfram Grandezka | Ansgar von Lahnstein | Verbotene Liebe | Forbidden Love |

=== Best Newcomer ===
| Winner and Nominees | Role | Original Title | English Title |
|---|---|---|---|
| Andreas Thiele | Jacob Krendlinger | Sturm der Liebe | Storm of Love |
| Annika Ernst | Conny Küppers | Lena – Liebe meines Lebens | Lena - Love of my Life |
| Bela Klentze | Bela Hoffmann | Unter uns | |
| Holger Matthias Wilhelm | Gregor Brunner | Dahoam is Dahoam | Home is Home |
| Jana Julie Kilka | Jessica Stiehl | Verbotene Liebe | Forbidden Love |
| Joanna Semmelrogge | Rosa Becker | Rote Rosen | |
| Julia Engelmann | Franziska Steinkamp | Alles was zählt | All That Matters |
| Lara-Isabelle Rentinck | Sabina Breuer | Marienhof | |
| Ronja Peters | Diana Blaschke | Eine wie keine | |
| Sebastian König | Maik Majewski | Anna und die Liebe | Anna and Love |
| Selina Müller | Luzi Beschenko | Hand aufs Herz | Hand on Heart |
| Senta-Sofia Delliponti | Tanja Seefeld | Gute Zeiten, schlechte Zeiten | Good Times, Bad Times |
| Sophie Lutz | Alexandra Franck | Hanna – Folge deinem Herzen | |

=== Sexiest Woman ===
| Winner and Nominees | Role | Original Title | English Title |
|---|---|---|---|
| Anne Apitzsch | Sophie Schwarz | Rote Rosen | |
| Claudelle Deckert | Eva Wagner | Unter uns | |
| Christine Reimer | Monika Vogl | Dahoam is Dahoam | Home is Home |
| Janina Uhse | Jasmin Flemming | Gute Zeiten, schlechte Zeiten | Good Times, Bad Times |
| Jasmin Lord | Rebecca von Lahnstein | Verbotene Liebe | Forbidden Love |
| Jessica Ginkel | Lena Sander | Lena – Liebe meines Lebens | Lena - Love of my Life |
| Juliette Menke | Lena Bergmann | Alles was zählt | All That Matters |
| Katrin Ritt | Yasemin Garcia | Marienhof | |
| Luise Bähr | Hanna Castellhoff | Hanna – Folge deinem Herzen | |
| Maja Maneiro | Paloma Greco | Anna und die Liebe | Anna and Love |
| Natalie Alison | Rosalie Engel | Sturm der Liebe | Storm of Love |
| Sophia Thomalla | Chris Putzer | Eine wie keine | |
| Verena Mundhenke | Alexandra Lohmann | Hand aufs Herz | Hand on Heart |

=== Sexiest Man ===
| Winner and Nominees | Role | Original Title | English Title |
|---|---|---|---|
| Andreas Jancke | Michael Heisig | Hand aufs Herz | Hand on Heart |
| Ben Ruedinger | Tilmann Weigel | Unter uns | |
| Dirk Moritz | Lennard Albers | Rote Rosen | |
| Erich Altenkopf | Michael Niederbühl | Sturm der Liebe | Storm of Love |
| Eugen Bauder | Moritz Berg | Eine wie keine | |
| Herbert Ulrich | Sebastian Wildner | Dahoam is Dahoam | Home is Home |
| Igor Dolgatschew | Deniz Öztürk | Alles was zählt | All That Matters |
| Jacob Weigert | Enrique Vegaz | Anna und die Liebe | Anna and Love |
| Kostas Sommer | Tony Weiss | Lena – Liebe meines Lebens | Lena - Love of my Life |
| Mickey Hardt | Stefan Faber | Hanna – Folge deinem Herzen | |
| Raúl Richter | Dominik Gundlach | Gute Zeiten, schlechte Zeiten | Good Times, Bad Times |
| Simon-Paul Wagner | Marlon Berger | Marienhof | |
| Stephan Käfer | Philipp zu Hohenfelden | Verbotene Liebe | Forbidden Love |

=== Female Fan Favourite ===
For the Female Fan Favourite there were no nominations. All actresses of all telenovelas and soap operas could be chosen.

| Winner | Role | Original Title | English Title |
|---|---|---|---|
| Lucy Scherer | Jenny Hartmann | Hand aufs Herz | Hand on Heart |

=== Male Fan Favourite ===
For the Male Fan Favourite there were no nominations. All actors of all telenovelas and soap operas could be chosen.

| Winner | Role | Original Title | English Title |
|---|---|---|---|
| Jo Weil | Oliver Sabel | Verbotene Liebe | Forbidden Love |

== German Soap Award 2012 ==
The second German Soap Awards was held on 26 October 2012 in the former Greater Berlin cinema Kosmos. Protagonists of telenovelas and soap operas were nominated in nine categories.

=== Best Actress ===
| Winner and Nominees | Role | Original Title | English Title |
|---|---|---|---|
| Andrea Cleven | Maja Ahlsen, geb. Iversen | Wege zum Glück – Spuren im Sand | Roads to Happiness |
| Antje Hagen | Hildegard Sonnbichler | Sturm der Liebe | Storm of Love |
| Doreen Dietel | Beatrix Preissinger | Dahoam is Dahoam | Home is Home |
| Gabriele Metzger | Charlie Schneider | Verbotene Liebe | Forbidden Love |
| Greta Galisch de Palma | Greta Sandacker | Wege zum Glück – Spuren im Sand | Roads to Happiness |
| Heidrun Gärtner | Annalena Brunner | Dahoam is Dahoam | Home is Home |
| Heike Jonca | Susanne Polauke | Anna und die Liebe | Anna and Love |
| Isabell Hertel | Ute Fink | Unter uns | |
| Isabell Horn | Pia Koch | Gute Zeiten, schlechte Zeiten | Good Times, Bad Times |
| Kaja Schmidt-Tychsen | Jennifer Steinkamp | Alles was zählt | All That Matters |
| Kim-Sarah Brandts | Helena Schmidt-Heisig | Hand aufs Herz | Hand on Heart |
| Lucy Scherer | Marlene Schweitzer | Sturm der Liebe | Storm of Love |
| Maike von Bremen | Isabelle Jung | Herzflimmern – Die Klinik am See | |
| Maria Wedig | Nina Hinze | Anna und die Liebe | Anna and Love |
| Marianne Rappenglück | Ursula Reisinger | Herzflimmern – Die Klinik am See | |
| Patricia Schäfer | Viktoria Wolf | Verbotene Liebe | Forbidden Love |
| Saskia Valencia | Katja Meissner | Rote Rosen | |
| Simone Ritscher | Doris van Norden | Sturm der Liebe | Storm of Love |
| Tatjana Clasing | Simone Steinkamp | Alles was zählt | All That Matters |
| Ulrike Frank | Katrin Flemming-Gerner | Gute Zeiten, schlechte Zeiten | Good Times, Bad Times |
| Valea Scalabrino | Sina Uhland | Unter uns | |
| Vanessa Jung | Beate Vogel | Hand aufs Herz | Hand on Heart |

=== Best Actor ===
| Winner and Nominees | Role | Original Title | English Title |
|---|---|---|---|
| André Dietz | Ingo Zadek | Alles was zählt | All That Matters |
| Andreas Jancke | Michael Heisig | Hand aufs Herz | Hand on Heart |
| Christopher Kohn | Ben Bergmann | Hand aufs Herz | Hand on Heart |
| Daniel Fehlow | Leon Moreno | Gute Zeiten, schlechte Zeiten | Good Times, Bad Times |
| Dirk Galuba | Werner Saalfeld | Sturm der Liebe | Storm of Love |
| Erich Altenkopf | Michael Niederbühl | Sturm der Liebe | Storm of Love |
| Gerry Hungbauer | Thomas Jansen | Rote Rosen | |
| Horst Kummeth | Roland Bamberger | Dahoam is Dahoam | Home is Home |
| Hans Stadlbauer | Alois Hofer | Herzflimmern – Die Klinik am See | |
| Jan Hartmann | Stefan Jung | Herzflimmern – Die Klinik am See | |
| Konrad Krauss | Arno Brandner | Verbotene Liebe | Forbidden Love |
| Patrick Müller | Tobias Lassner | Unter uns | |
| Klaus-Dieter Klebsch | Bruno Lanford | Anna und die Liebe | Anna and Love |
| Lars Steinhöfel | Ingo Winter | Unter uns | |
| Miloš Vuković | Paco Weigel | Unter uns | |
| Sascha Tschorn | Kilian Ahlsen | Wege zum Glück – Spuren im Sand | Roads to Happiness |
| Sebastian König | Maik Majewski | Anna und die Liebe | Anna and Love |
| Silvan-Pierre Leirich | Richard Steinkamp | Alles was zählt | All That Matters |
| Simon Licht | Arthur Groth | Wege zum Glück – Spuren im Sand | Roads to Happiness |
| Thomas Drechsel | Max Krüger | Gute Zeiten, schlechte Zeiten | Good Times, Bad Times |
| Thorsten Nindel | Philipp Stein | Rote Rosen | |
| Tommy Schwimmer | Florian Brunner | Dahoam is Dahoam | Home is Home |
| Wolfram Grandezka | Ansgar von Lahnstein | Verbotene Liebe | Forbidden Love |

=== Best Lovers ===
| Winner and Nominees | Role | Original Title | English Title |
|---|---|---|---|
| Andrea Cleven and Florian Thunemann | Maja Ahlsen and Robert Ahlsen | Wege zum Glück – Spuren im Sand | Roads to Happiness |
| Caroline Beil and Michael Schiller | Shirley Wilson and Roland Bernheimer | Herzflimmern – Die Klinik am See | |
| Claudelle Deckert and Ben Ruedinger | Eva Wagner and Tilmann Weigel | Unter uns | |
| Daniel Fünffrock and Ines Lutz | Moritz van Norden and Theresa Burger | Sturm der Liebe | Storm of Love |
| Harry Blank and Doreen Dietel | Michael Preissinger and Beatrix Preissinger | Dahoam is Dahoam | Home is Home |
| Lucy Scherer and Kasia Borek | Jenny Hartmann and Emma Müller | Hand aufs Herz | Hand on Heart |
| Maria Wedig and Manuel Cortez | Nina Hinze and Luca Benzoni | Anna und die Liebe | Anna and Love |
| Sıla Şahin and Jörn Schlönvoigt | Ayla Özgül and Philip Höfer | Gute Zeiten, schlechte Zeiten | Good Times, Bad Times |
| Stefanie Bock and Remo Schulze | Leonie Richter and Timo Mendes | Verbotene Liebe | Forbidden Love |
| Tatjana Clasing and Silvan-Pierre Leirich | Simone Steinkamp and Richard Steinkamp | Alles was zählt | All That Matters |
| Thorsten Nindel and Saskia Valencia | Philipp Stein and Katja Meissner | Rote Rosen | |

=== Best Villain ===
| Winner and Nominees | Role | Original Title | English Title |
|---|---|---|---|
| Andrea Schmitt | Nina Kreutzer | Dahoam is Dahoam | Home is Home |
| Ania Niedieck | Isabelle Reichenbach | Alles was zählt | All That Matters |
| Björn Harras | Patrick Graf jr | Gute Zeiten, schlechte Zeiten | Good Times, Bad Times |
| Francisco Medina | Maximilian von Altenburg | Alles was zählt | All That Matters |
| Frederic Böhle | Kai Kosmar | Anna und die Liebe | Anna and Love |
| Frederic Heidorn | Ronnie Peters | Hand aufs Herz | Hand on Heart |
| Joachim Lätsch | André Konopka | Sturm der Liebe | Storm of Love |
| Maike von Bremen | Isabelle Jung | Herzflimmern – Die Klinik am See | |
| Max Engelke | Edmund Hartwig | Wege zum Glück – Spuren im Sand | Roads to Happiness |
| Miriam Lahnstein | Tanja von Lahnstein | Verbotene Liebe | Forbidden Love |
| Sabine Bach | Saskia von Hagen | Herzflimmern – Die Klinik am See | |
| Sarah Mühlhause | Carla Lindenberg | Anna und die Liebe | Anna and Love |
| Sascha Tschorn | Kilian Ahlsen | Wege zum Glück – Spuren im Sand | Roads to Happiness |
| Simone Ritscher | Doris van Norden | Sturm der Liebe | Storm of Love |
| Stefan Feddersen-Clausen | Vincent Vanlohen | Rote Rosen | |
| Stefan Franz | Rolf Jäger | Unter uns | |
| Tabea Heynig | Britta Schönfeld | Unter uns | |
| Ulrich Drewes | Rüdiger Steinkamp | Alles was zählt | All That Matters |
| Wolfgang Bahro | Hans-Joachim Gerner | Gute Zeiten, schlechte Zeiten | Good Times, Bad Times |
| Wolfram Grandezka | Ansgar von Lahnstein | Verbotene Liebe | Forbidden Love |

=== Best Newcomer ===
| Winner and Nominees | Role | Original Title | English Title |
|---|---|---|---|
| Alexa Eilers | Yvonne Preissinger | Dahoam is Dahoam | Home is Home |
| Carina Diesing | Victoria Wilson | Herzflimmern – Die Klinik am See | |
| Caroline Frier | Beatrice Meyer | Alles was zählt | All That Matters |
| Florian Frowein | Leon Schilling | Wege zum Glück – Spuren im Sand | Roads to Happiness |
| Frank Ziegler | Bodo Wilhelmsen | Hand aufs Herz | Hand on Heart |
| Iris Mareike Steen | Liljane Seefeld | Gute Zeiten, schlechte Zeiten | Good Times, Bad Times |
| Iris Shala | Michelle Herrmann | Anna und die Liebe | Anna and Love |
| Jascha Rust | Zacharias Klingenthal | Gute Zeiten, schlechte Zeiten | Good Times, Bad Times |
| Katharina Woschek | Zoé Laffort | Alles was zählt | All That Matters |
| Lili Gesler | Elena Majoré | Sturm der Liebe | Storm of Love |
| Marie-Claire Schuller | Charlotte Keller | Dahoam is Dahoam | Home is Home |
| Mine Voss | Suji Wagner | Unter uns | |
| Moritz Tittel | Konstantin Riedmüller | Sturm der Liebe | Storm of Love |
| Sonja Bertram | Nina Möller | Wege zum Glück – Spuren im Sand | Roads to Happiness |
| Timothy Boldt | Richard Beckmann | Unter uns | |

=== Sexiest Woman ===
| Winner and Nominees | Role | Original Title | English Title |
|---|---|---|---|
| Alexa Eilers | Yvonne Preissinger | Dahoam is Dahoam | Home is Home |
| Andrea Cleven | Maja Ahlsen | Wege zum Glück – Spuren im Sand | Roads to Happiness |
| Ania Niedieck | Isabelle Reichenbach | Alles was zählt | All That Matters |
| Caroline Beil | Shirley Wilson | Herzflimmern – Die Klinik am See | |
| Claudelle Deckert | Eva Wagner | Unter uns | |
| Isabella Hübner | Christiane Keller | Dahoam is Dahoam | Home is Home |
| Jana Julie Kilka | Jessica Stiehl | Verbotene Liebe | Forbidden Love |
| Janina Uhse | Jasmin Flemming | Gute Zeiten, schlechte Zeiten | Good Times, Bad Times |
| Jelena Mitschke | Britta Berger | Rote Rosen | |
| Joy Lee Juana Abiola-Müller | Michelle Fink | Unter uns | |
| Judith Hildebrandt | Tanja Heinemann | Sturm der Liebe | Storm of Love |
| Juliette Menke | Lena Bergmann | Alles was zählt | All That Matters |
| Katharina Nesytowa | Alexandra Overbeck | Wege zum Glück – Spuren im Sand | Roads to Happiness |
| Kim-Sarah Brandts | Helena Schmidt-Heisig | Hand aufs Herz | Hand on Heart |
| Lili Gesler | Elena Majoré | Sturm der Liebe | Storm of Love |
| Lilli Hollunder | Jasmin Al Sharif | Anna und die Liebe | Anna and Love |
| Maja Maneiro | Paloma Greco | Anna und die Liebe | Anna and Love |
| Maria Fuchs | Carla Saravakos | Rote Rosen | |
| Nicole Mieth | Kim Wolf | Verbotene Liebe | Forbidden Love |
| Nina Schmieder | Laura von Hagen | Herzflimmern – Die Klinik am See | |
| Sıla Şahin | Ayla Özgül | Gute Zeiten, schlechte Zeiten | Good Times, Bad Times |
| Sonja Bertram | Nina Möller | Wege zum Glück – Spuren im Sand | Roads to Happiness |

=== Sexiest Man ===
| Winner and Nominees | Role | Original Title | English Title |
|---|---|---|---|
| Bela Klentze | Bela Hoffmann | Unter uns | |
| Daniel Sellier | Ricardo Mendes | Verbotene Liebe | Forbidden Love |
| Felix von Jascheroff | John Bachmann | Gute Zeiten, schlechte Zeiten | Good Times, Bad Times |
| Florian Stadler | Nils Heinemann | Sturm der Liebe | Storm of Love |
| Florian Thunemann | Robert Ahlsen | Wege zum Glück – Spuren im Sand | Roads to Happiness |
| Florian Wünsche | Emilio Sanchez | Verbotene Liebe | Forbidden Love |
| Frederic Heidorn | Ronnie Peters | Hand aufs Herz | Hand on Heart |
| Harry Blank | Michael Preissinger | Dahoam is Dahoam | Home is Home |
| Hendrik Borgmann | Frank Peters | Hand aufs Herz | Hand on Heart |
| Jacob Weigert | Enrique Vegaz | Anna und die Liebe | Anna and Love |
| Jan Hartmann | Stefan Jung | Herzflimmern – Die Klinik am See | |
| Jörg Rohde | Ben Roschinski | Alles was zählt | All That Matters |
| Max Engelke | Edmund Hartwig | Wege zum Glück – Spuren im Sand | Roads to Happiness |
| Maximilian Claus | Erik Hansen | Unter uns | |
| Moritz Tittel | Konstantin Riedmüller | Sturm der Liebe | Storm of Love |
| Patrick Kalupa | Tom Lanford | Anna und die Liebe | Anna and Love |
| Peter Foyse | Lars Winter | Rote Rosen | |
| Raúl Richter | Dominik Gundlach | Gute Zeiten, schlechte Zeiten | Good Times, Bad Times |
| Salvatore Greco | Jan Marco Schöler | Alles was zählt | All That Matters |
| Saša Kekez | Mesut Acar | Herzflimmern – Die Klinik am See | |
| Tobias Rosen | Michael Eckart | Rote Rosen | |
| Tommy Schwimmer | Florian Brunner | Dahoam is Dahoam | Home is Home |
| Ben Ruedinger | Tilmann Weigel | Unter uns | |
| Stephan Käfer | Philipp zu Hohenfelden | Verbotene Liebe | Forbidden Love |

=== Female Fan Favourite ===
For the Female Fan Favourite there were no nominations. All actresses of all telenovelas and soap operas could be chosen.

| Winner | Role | Original Title | English Title |
|---|---|---|---|
| Kasia Borek | Emma Müller | Hand aufs Herz | Hand on Heart |

=== Male Fan Favourite ===
For the Male Fan Favourite there were no nominations. All actors of all telenovelas and soap operas could be chosen.

| Winner | Role | Original Title | English Title |
|---|---|---|---|
| Jo Weil | Oliver Sabel | Verbotene Liebe | Forbidden Love |

=== Jury Prize ===
| Award | Accepted by | Original Title | English Title |
|---|---|---|---|
| Beste Serie | Ulrike Frank | Gute Zeiten, schlechte Zeiten | Good Times, Bad Times |
| Sozialverantwortliches Erzählen | Rainer Wemcken & Joy Lee Abiola | Unter uns | |

=== Ehrenpreis ===
| Winner | Role | Original Title | English Title |
|---|---|---|---|
| Marie-Luise Marjan | Helga Beimer | Lindenstraße | |
