= Tobias Schönenberg =

German actor and photomodel (born 1986)

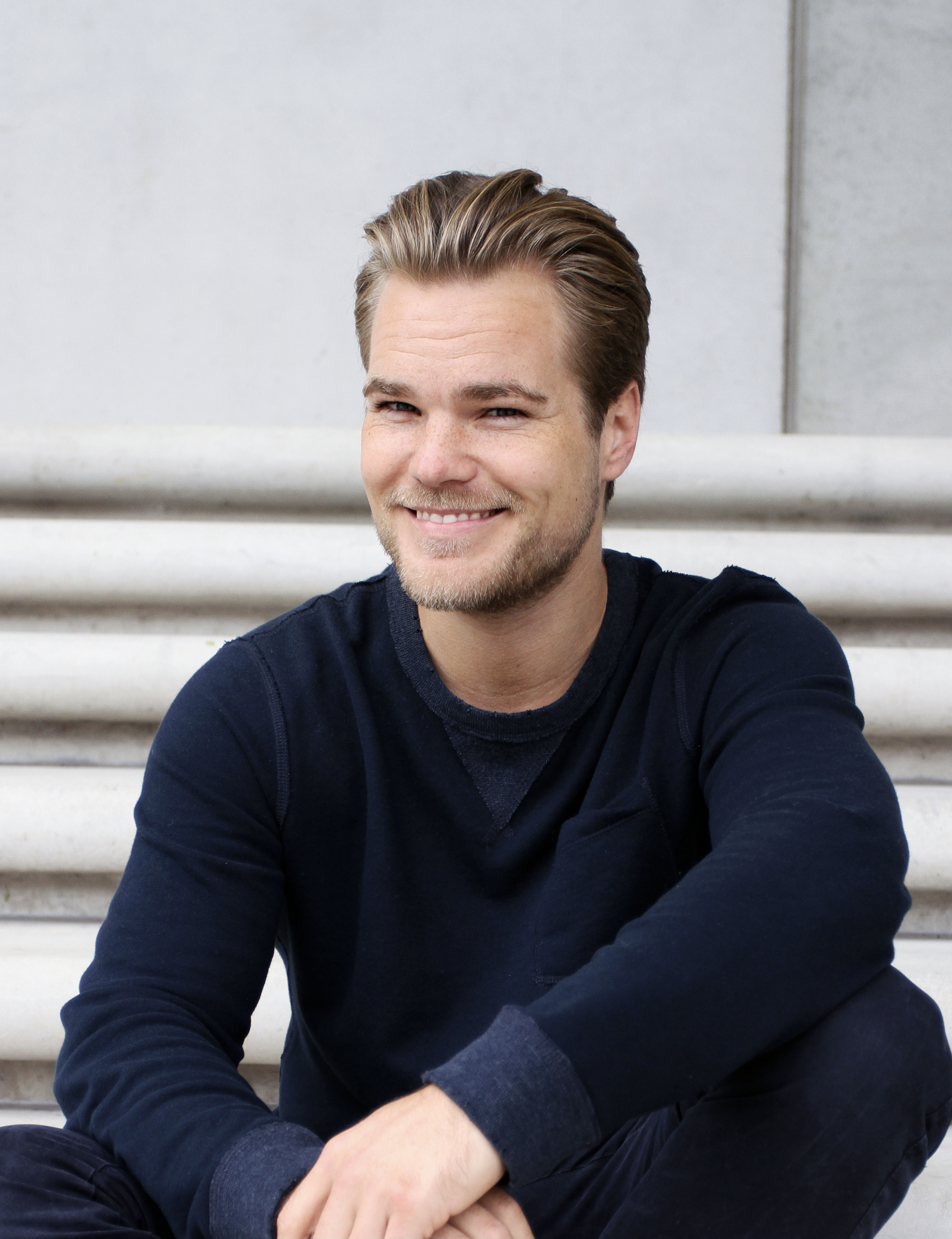
Tobias Schönenberg

Tobias Schönenberg (born 17 August 1986 in Hagen, West Germany) is a German actor and film director.

In 2003, Tobias began earning money as a photomodel. He had always planned to study medicine, but a year and a half later, his career took off when he was offered a part in the German television soap Verbotene Liebe (Forbidden love), which has been running on the national television network Das Erste (The first) since 1995.

Tobias made his debut on 15 April 2005 as Paul Brandner, the handsome teenager with green eyes and blond hair, who is every woman's dream man. Paul, the adopted son of Susanne Brandner, finds himself in the midst of several troubled love triangles.

In 2010, Tobias starred alongside his twin brother Stefan in Florian Gottschick's Twins, a short film that explores how the eponymous twins' incestuous sexual relationship influences and is influenced by one of the twins' impending nuptials.

His surname, Schönenberg, aptly means ‘beautiful mountain’.

== Actor-filmography ==
- 2003: Sein oder Träumen («Be or dreaming»), short film
- 2005: Unser Charly («Our Charly»), family series
- 2005–2007: Verbotene Liebe («Forbidden love»), soap opera
- 2008: 112 – Sie retten dein Leben («112 – They save your life»), soap opera
