= Sonja Bertram =

German actress

- Born: 14 September 1984 (age 41)
- Occupation: Actress
- Website: sonjabertram.com

Sonja Bertram (born 14 September 1984) is a German actress.

== Life and career ==
She spent most of her childhood in Dießen, Bavaria, the second of four children born to Josef and Gabi Bertram. She grew up with two brothers and a sister.

Her father detected Sonja's acting talent at fourteen, when she acted alongside her younger brother Tim, who made his debut appearance on screen in the movie, 'Puenktchen and Anton'.

She started her acting career in the role of Marie Ziegler in the movie 'Lieber boeser Weihnachtsmann', directed by Ben Verbong.

When she was twenty she studied singing and acting at the University of Cologne/ Aachen. Along the way she has starred in many series including 'Der Letze Zeuge' with Ulrich Muehe and the German crime 'SOKO Wismar' directed by Hans-Christoph Blumenberg.

Since 2008 the actress has lived in Berlin.

== Filmography ==
- 1999: Lieber böser Weihnachtsmann
- 2000: Ein unmöglicher Mann
- 2000: Bei aller Liebe
- 2001: Der Landarzt
- 2001: Anwalt Abel
- 2001: Unser Charly
- 2001: Sturmfrei
- 2001: Das Schneeparadies
- 2001: Für alle Fälle Stefanie
- 2002: Für alle Fälle Stefanie
- 2003: Um Himmels Willen
- 2003: Siska
- 2003: Medicopter 117
- 2006: Bravo TV Fiction
- 2006: Die Rosenheim-Cops
- 2007: Der letzte Zeuge
- 2008: Aktenzeichen XY… ungelöst
- 2009: SOKO Wismar
- 2010/11: Hand aufs Herz
- 2012: Wege zum Glück
- 2013: Letzte Spur Berlin
- 2015: Punk Berlin 1982
- 2015: Inga Lindström - Elin und die Anderssons
- 2016: Chaos-Queens: Für jede Lösung ein Problem
- 2017: Das Traumschiff: Tansania
