= DoppioTV =

doppioTV
- Headquarters: Berlin, Germany

Programming
- Language(s): German, English, Russian, Spanish

Ownership
- Owner: Publishers Partners

History
- Launched: 2014

Links
- Website: www.doppio.tv

doppioTV is a multilingual online TV-Channel based in Berlin-Adlershof, available for viewers via Astra Satellite, via DVB-T, as an app and on the website www.doppio.tv in Full-HD quality. Main topics covered by the channel include travel, lifestyle, culture, food, sports and automobiles. DoppioTV began airing on April 13, 2015, and it airs daily on the Swiss TV Channel TV24, Monday to Friday at 5:00 pm (CET).

== History ==
doppioTV emerged from the print magazine "doppio", issued by Publisher Partners. Starting in 2008, it appeared daily with a circulation of approximately 2.5 million copies and was distributed as a free supplement to 28 daily newspapers. Since the year of 2014, it appears once a month as an ePaper instead. The ePaper focuses primarily on stories about travel, lifestyle, food, culture events.

== Programmes/Formats ==
- Daily show doppioTV Magazin with Caroline Beil
- feature films, reports of different length

== Rating/Access figures ==
In January 2015 the access figures increased fivefold in comparison with the previous month. In February the hits reached 1,07 Mln.
