= Ferdinand Hofer =

German actor (born 1993)

Ferdinand 'Ferdi' Hofer
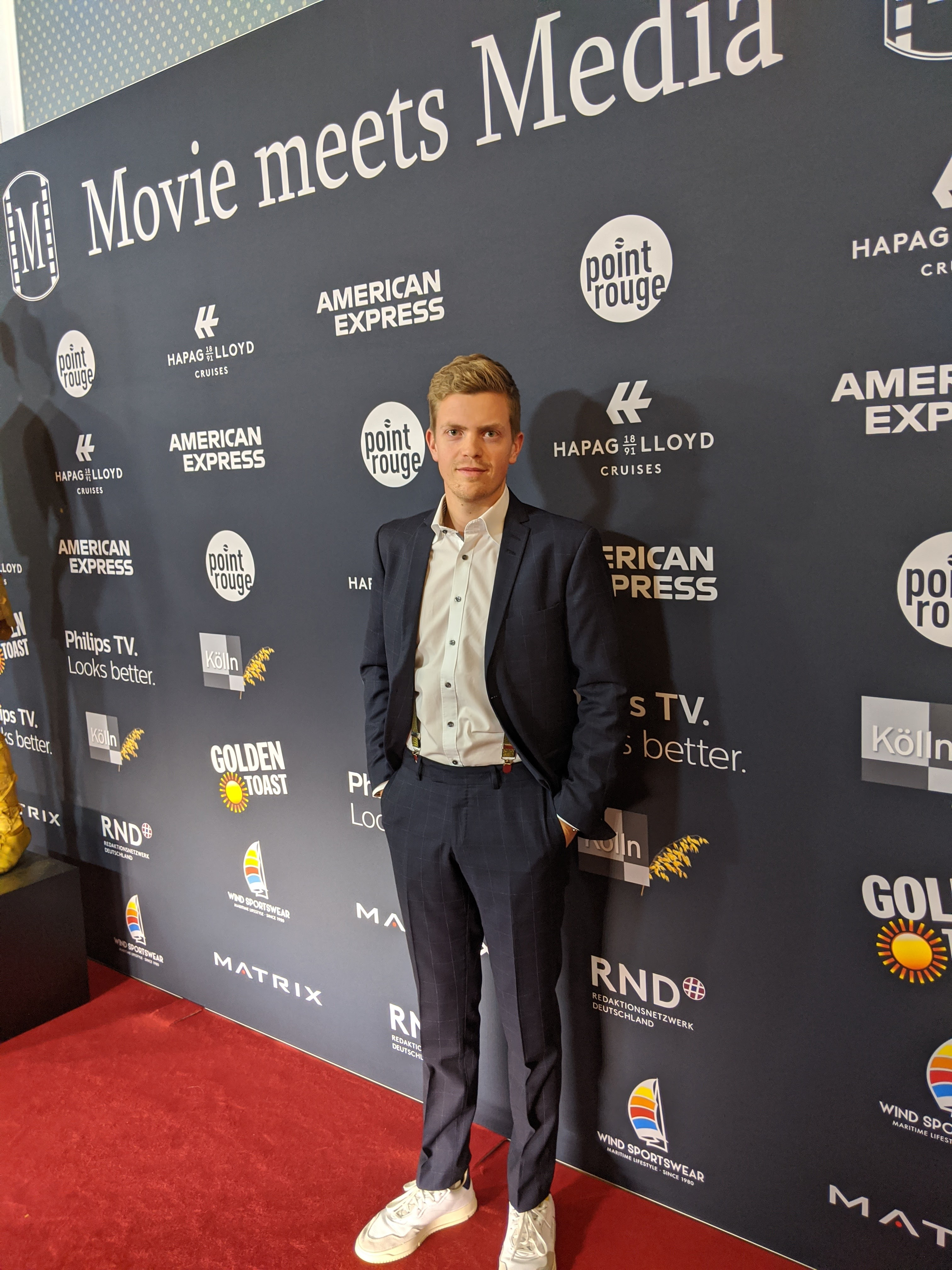
- Ferdi in 2019
- Born: 1993 (age 32–33)

Ferdinand Hofer (born 1993) is a German actor.

== Life ==
Hofer was born in Großseeham in the district of Miesbach, where he also grew up.

He was already playing some of the main roles in the school theater. At the age of 12, he met a Bavarian director, Marcus H. Rosenmüller, who also came from the district of Miesbach, and whom he met through his uncle, for the movie Heavyweights. His role was the one of Toni, which he played at the age of 13.

He was subsequently contracted by a theater company and has been working in some successful cinema and television productions since then, e.g. in Little White Lies (2009), also under the direction of Marcus H. Rosenmüller, Weniger ist Mehr (2013) and Dampfnudelblues (2013). He played Max Simmerl, the son of the butcher Simmerl. He also had the role of Max Simmerl in the crime drama Winterkartoffelknödel (2014).

In the TV series Dahoam is Dahoam he played Benny, former school friend of the main character Charlotte "Charlie" Keller.

In 2011, he performed in Miesbach school theater. He had the main role of the musical Joseph & the Amazing Technicolor Dreamcoat.

In 2013, Hofer became an assistant for the Münchner police chiefs Batic and Leitmayr in the ARD crime series Tatort. His debut in Tatort was in May 2014. In his debut, he played the 23-year-old Kalli Hammermann, a newcomer from the police school. He plays the same role in the following episodes of the series Tatort.

Hofer currently lives in Munich.

== Filmography ==
- 2006: Heavyweights (cinema)
- 2009: Little White Lies (cinema)
- 2013: Weniger ist mehr (TV film)
- 2013: Dampfnudelblues (cinema)
- 2013: Dahoam is Dahoam (TV soap)
- 2014: Winterkartoffelknödel (cinema)
- 2014: Tatort: Am Ende des Flurs (TV film)
- 2014: Tatort: Der Wüstensohn (TV film)
- 2014: Tatort: Das verkaufte Lächeln (TV film)
- 2015: Tatort: Die letzte Wiesn (TV film)
- 2015: Tatort: Einmal wirklich sterben (TV film)
- 2015: Tatort: Mia san jetz da wo's weh tut (TV film)
- 2016: Tatort: Die Wahrheit
