= Artusi =

Artusi is an Italian surname. Notable people with the surname include:

- Catalina Artusi (born 1990), Argentine actress
- Giovanni Artusi (1540–1613), Italian composer, music theorist and famous reactionary music critic
- Pellegrino Artusi (1820–1922), Italian author
