= Lucy Scherer =

German singer, dancer and actress (born 1981)

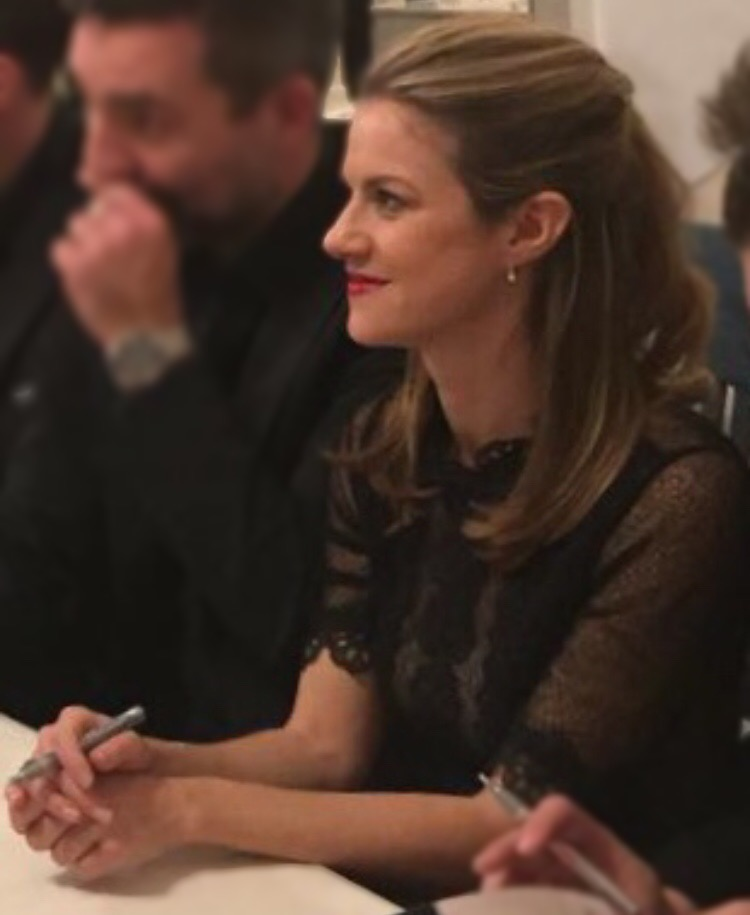
- Scherer in 2017
- Born: Lucy Barbara Eleonore Scherer; 5 April 1981 (age 43); Munich, Bavaria, West Germany
- Occupation(s): Actress, Singer, Dancer
- Years active: 2004–present
- Website: lucyscherer.de

Lucy Eleonore Barbara Scherer (born 5 April 1981 in Munich) is a German singer, dancer and actress.

== Career ==
Lucy Scherer was born in Munich and grew up in Regensburg. In childhood, she took ballet and piano lessons, and later gained first experiences at the Stadttheater Regensburg. 1998/1999 she spent a year at the School for Creative and Performing Arts in Cincinnati, Ohio, and received the "Senior Diploma Musical Theatre / Dance." After graduating from Albertus Magnus High School, she studied at the Berlin University of the Arts. She received her diploma with distinction in 2006. In the same year she took over the musical Dance of the Vampires in the theater of the West, the female lead role of Sarah in 2007 and also played in the Swiss premiere of Les Misérables as Eponine.

From November 2007 to January 2010, she played in the German premiere of Wicked at the Palladium Theater Stuttgart the lead role of the witch Glinda. In February 2010, she took over for a short period, the role of Sarah in the musical Dance of the Vampires also Palladium Theater in Stuttgart.

From 17 January 2011 to 2 September 2011, she starred in the telenovela Hand aufs Herz in the role of Jenny Hartmann. From December 2011 to April 2012 and in May 2012 Lucy Scherer appeared as Ich in Rebecca in Palladium Theater Stuttgart on stage. Also in 2012, she received the lead female role of Marlene Schweitzer in the eighth season of Storm of Love.

From 28 June 2013 to 2 August 2013 Lucy Scherer played Sally Bowles in the musical Cabaret on stage at the theater tent TIPI am Kanzleramt.

== Theater ==
Year	Title	Role	Theater
2004	Orpheus in the Underworld	Furie	Hans Otto Theater, Potsdam
2005–2006	Cabaret	Mausi	Bar jeder Vernunft, Berlin
2005–2006	Letterland	Melanie Flut	Neuköllner Oper, Berlin
2006–2007	Dance of the Vampires	Sarah	Theater des Westens, Berlin
2007	Les Misérables	Eponine	Theater St. Gallen
2007–2010	Wicked	Glinda	Palladium Theater, Stuttgart
2010	Dance of the Vampires	Sarah	Palladium Theater, Stuttgart
2010–2011	Lulu the Musical	Lulu	Tiroler Landestheater, Innsbruck
2011–2012	Rebecca	Ich	Palladium Theater, Stuttgart
2013	Cabaret	Sally Bowles	TIPI am Kanzleramt, Berlin

== Television ==
Year	Title	Role	Notes
2005	Tatort	Singer	1 Episode: Vorstadtballade
2008	112 – Sie retten dein Leben	Marc's Girlfriend	1 Episode
2010–2011	Hand aufs Herz	Jenny Hartmann	Won German Soap Award 2011 – Fanpreis weiblich
2012–2013	Storm of Love	Marlene Schweitzer	Won German Soap Award 2012 – Beste Darstellerin Telenovela

== Discography ==
Year	Title	Notes
2005	Letterland	Berlin Cast
2005	Freisleben	
2007	Wicked	Original German Cast
2008	Wenn Rosenblätter fallen	Studio Cast Recording (Composer: Rory Six)
2008	The Diaries of Adam and Eve	Berlin Cast
2010	Lulu the musical	Complete Recording, Innsbruck
2010	Hand aufs Herz	Soundtrack to the series
