= Vanessa Jung =

German actress (born 1980)

Vanessa Jung (born 29 February 1980 in Munich, West Germany) is a German actress.

After school she went to New York City and had a professional acting training. Before, she had a modern dance training in Munich.

At the age of fifteen, she got a role in the soap opera So ist das Leben!. Vanessa played the contract role of Lena Wagenfeld until the show got canceled one year later.

In 2005, she took over the role of Jana von Lahnstein in the soap opera Verbotene Liebe and stayed with the show for three years; leaving in February 2008. A year later, Vanessa took the recurring role of Karla Müller in the telenovela Sturm der Liebe. In August 2010, the actress appeared in Marienhof for a three-episode-stint as Elvira Schnier.

From October 2010 to September 2011, Vanessa played one of the main roles, music teacher Beate Vogel, in the Sat.1 soap opera Hand aufs Herz, which reunites her with former Verbotene Liebe co-star Andreas Jancke.

== Filmography ==
- Lutz & Hardy – Nur ein kleiner Biss
- T.V. Kaiser
- Parkhotel Stern
- Thommi und Claudia in Gefahr (1990; Bâloise Jubiläumsstiftung)
- Anwalt Abel - Rufmord (1994)
- So ist das Leben! Die Wagenfelds (1995–1996)
- Blutiger Akkord (1997)
- Zugriff (1997)
- Weißblaue Geschichten (1997)
- Dr. Stefan Frank – Der Arzt, dem die Frauen vertrauen (1997)
- OP ruft Dr. Bruckner – Die besten Ärzte Deutschlands: Die vernähte Frau (1998)
- Aus heiterem Himmel: Jetzt oder nie (1998)
- SOKO 5113: Siebzigtausend (1998)
- Der Kobold (1998)
- Rosamunde Pilcher: Dornen im Tal der Blumen (1998)
- Mutter wider Willen (1998)
- Typisch Ed! (1999)
- Kissing My Sister (2000)
- Stimme des Herzens (2000)
- Mein Vater ist ein Mörder (2000)
- Männer sind zum Abgewöhnen (2001)
- 100 Pro (2001)
- Alphateam – Die Lebensretter im OP: Nervenkrieg (2003)
- Verbotene Liebe (2005–2008)
- Killing Emma (2007)
- Sturm der Liebe (2009)
- Marienhof (2010)
- Lady Pochoir (2010)
- Hand aufs Herz (2010–2011)
