= Isabel Macedo =

Argentine actress and singer

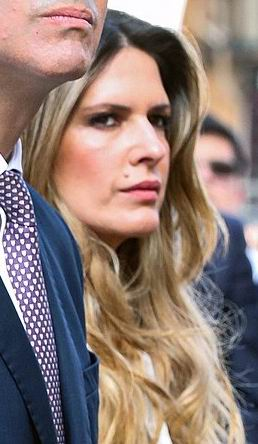
- Isabel Macedo in 2019

First Lady of Salta Province
- In role September 24, 2016 – December 10, 2019
- President: Juan Manuel Urtubey
- Preceded by: Betina Marcuzzi
- Succeeded by: Elena Cornejo San Miguel

Personal details
- Born: María Isabel Macedo; August 2, 1975 (age 51) San Salvador de Jujuy, Argentina
- Party: Justicialist Party
- Spouse: Juan Manuel Urtubey (m. 2016)
- Children: 2
- Education: Saint Catherine's Moorlands School
- Alma mater: University of Belgrano
- Occupation: Actress and singer

María Isabel Macedo (born August 2, 1975) is an Argentine actress and singer. She was the First Lady of Salta Province from September 24, 2016 until December 10, 2019.

== Biography ==
María Isabel Macedo was born in San Salvador de Jujuy, Argentina on August 2, 1975. For most of her childhood she lived in an apartment located in the neighborhood of Palermo, Ciudad de Buenos Aires, Argentina. Her father was a jujeño agronomist and her mother a teacher. Much of her family is from the province of San Salvador de Jujuy, Argentina. She is the youngest of four brothers, although in reality it is three half brothers, because they are children of their father's first wife. She studied at Saint Catherine's Moorlands School, and then enrolled in the University of Belgrano, in the hotel career. However, she never finished her university studies, since she decided to devote herself to the world of acting.

== Career ==
Isabel Macedo had her first acting opportunity in the telenovela Ricos y Famosos in 1997. However, she participated only in three chapters because it did not meet the necessary requirements. Her second appearance was in youth fiction titled Verano del '98, where she managed to get the role of Felicitas, who played between 1998 and 1999. From that moment, new opportunities appeared, and Isabel Macedo was considered, Muñeca Brava, Amor latino and 1000 milliones. In 2003, she made a special participation in telecomedy Son amores. Success and recognition came with her participation in youth fiction Floricienta, in which she played Delfina, the antagonist of the story, in his two seasons. In 2006, she was one of the protagonists of Alma Pirata and in 2007 she had a participation in Mexican telecomedy Amor mío and she worked on telecomedy Son de Fierro for three months, replacing Mónica Antonópulos. Between 2008 and 2009 she was the main antagonist of the telenovela Don Juan y Su Bella Dama, starring Joaquín Furriel, Romina Gaetani and Benjamín Vicuña, which ended on March 9, 2009 becoming a success. Her character from Serena Monterrey earn her her first nomination for Martín Fierro Awards. In the summer of that same year she won the role of Marga Molinari, the main antagonist of Botineras, a telenovela co-produced by Underground Contenidos, Endemol and Telefe between 2009 and 2010. For her work on these last two telenovelas, she received her second nomination for Martín Fierro Awards. Between the end of 2010 and the beginning of 2011, she recorded a travel program along different parts of the world along with Felipe Colombo, which is titled La vuelta al mundo, this being her debut as Television Presenter. The program aired during the summer of 2012. During 2011 it is called to star, along with Juan Gil Navarro, Eva De Dominici, Mónica Galán, Maximiliano Ghione and Justina Bustos, Dance!, Child-youth fiction that was made in Uruguay, which is a success in that country. She plays Laura Redondo, a dance teacher. In addition, she was one of the actresses invited in a chapter of El hombre de tu vida, unitary starring Guillermo Francella. In 2012, Isabel is in one of the two most important channels of Argentine television at the same time. This is due to the broadcast of the program La vuelta al mundo by Canal 13 and again in an antagonistic role in telecomedy Graduados by Telefe. For her work in this fiction, she is nominated for the third time to Martín Fierro Awards, winning the Award in competition with Nancy Dupláa, Carina Zampini, Celeste Cid and Vanesa González. It is the first prize for the actress, with three nominations. In March 2013 she recorded his participation in the video clip of the song Mírenla, by the Argentine rock band Ciro y los Persas. It is her first foray as the protagonist of a music clip. In 2014 she returns to Canal 13 in a fiction of Pol-ka Producciones, starring Guapas with Mercedes Morán, Carla Peterson, Florencia Bertotti and Araceli González. For this work, she is nominated for the fourth time to Martín Fierro Awards in the category of Best Leading Actress in a Novel. In February 2015 she stars in Telefe the miniseries Fronteras. She plays Dr. Sonia Miller, who loses her job in Buenos Aires, Argentina and is hired as a border doctor at a Misiones hospital. It is the first absolute leading role for the actress, leading the cast of fiction. In the same year, she starred in the web miniseries eLovers next to the soccer player Ezequiel Lavezzi. In January 2017 she returns to Telefe as the protagonist of the telenovela Amar, después de amar with Mariano Martínez, Eleonora Wexler and Federico Amador. In March 2018 she participated in some chapters of the miniseries Sandro de América, she played Daniela Paciani, one of the artist's wives.

== Personal life ==
From 1996 to 2006, Isabel Macedo was in a relationship with actor Facundo Arana. From 2010 to 2013, Isabel Macedo was in a relationship with the soccer player Federico Insúa. In 2014, she began a relationship with the polista Martín Tassara, having separated from him the following year.

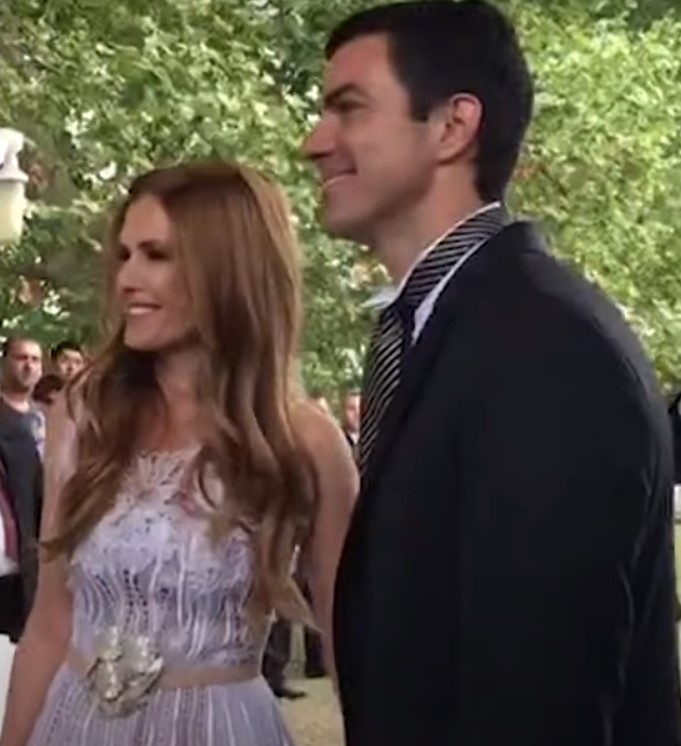
Isabel Macedo and Juan Manuel Urtubey in their wedding in 2016.

In 2016, Isabel Macedo confirmed her relationship with the Governor of the Province of Salta Juan Manuel Urtubey. On September 24, 2016, she married the Governor of the Province of Salta Juan Manuel Urtubey. The ceremony took place in the residence "Finca Las Costas" of the governor, with around 400 guests among which there were numerous figures of politics and the artistic medium. On October 19, 2017 the couple announced that they were expecting their first child. On May 7, 2018, she gave birth to the couple's first child, a girl, whom they called Isabel Urtubey Macedo was born in the province of Salta. On June 4, 2022, she gave birth to the couple's second child, a girl, whom they called Julia Urtubey Macedo.

== Filmography ==
=== Television ===
Year	Title	Character	Channel
1997	Ricos y Famosos	Isabel	Canal 9
1998–1999	Verano del '98	Felicitas	Telefe
1999	Muñeca Brava	Ana	Telefe
2000	Amor latino	Eugenia Ferrarotti	Canal 9
2002	1000 millones	Carmen	Canal 13
2003	Son amores	Inés Madrigal	Canal 13
2004–2005	Floricienta	Delfina Santillán Torres Oviedo/Rosita Violeta Torres	Canal 13
2006	Alma Pirata	Clara Troglio	Telefe
2007	Amor mío	Daniela Sánchez	Las Estrellas
2007–2008	Son de Fierro	Sissí	Canal 13
2008–2009	Don Juan y Su Bella Dama	Serena Monterrey/Graciela Ramírez	Telefe
2009–2010	Botineras	Margarita "Marga" Molinari	Telefe
2011	Dance!	Laura "Pekas" Redondo	Canal 10
2011	El hombre de tu vida	Olivia	Telefe
2012	Graduados	Jimena Benítez/Patricia Longo	Telefe
2014–2015	Guapas	Laura Luna	Canal 13
2015	Fronteras	Dr. Sonia Miller	Telefe
2017	Amar después de amar	Raquel Judith Levin de Kaplan	Telefe
2018	Sandro de América	Daniela Paciani	Telefe
2024–2026	Margarita	Delfina Santillán Torres Oviedo/Rosita Violeta Torres	Max

=== Movies ===
Year	Movie	Character	Director
1997	Cenizas del Paraíso	Heir's wife	Marcelo Piñeyro
2008	Gigantes de Valdéz	Cecilia	Alex Tossemberger

=== Theater ===
Year	Title	Character	Director
2002	El mes de las novias		Manuel Iedvabni
2003–2004	La sartén por el mango	Andrea	Marcelo Cosentino
2004–2005	Floricienta	Delfina Santillán Torres-Oviedo	Cris Morena
2011	Dance!	Laura "Pekas" Redondo	Ricky Pashkus

=== Television Programs ===
Year	Program	Channel	Notes
2012–2013	La vuelta al mundo	Canal 13	Television Presenter
2013	Pura Química	ESPN	Guest Panelist

=== Videoclips ===
Year	Artist	Song
2013	Ciro y los Persas	Mírenla

== Awards and nominations ==
Year	Award	Category	Work	Result
2009	Martín Fierro Awards	Actress Protagonist of the Novel	Don Juan y Su Bella Dama	Nominated
2010	Martín Fierro Awards	Actress Protagonist of the Novel	Don Juan y Su Bella Dama and Botineras	Nominated
2012	Tato Awards	Supporting Actress in Daily Fiction	Graduados	Nominated
2013	Martín Fierro Awards	Actress Protagonist in Daily Fiction	Graduados	Winner
2015	Martín Fierro Awards	Actress Protagonist in Daily Fiction	Guapas	Nominated
2017	Notirey Awards	Best Actress Protagonist in Daily Fiction	Amar después de amar	Nominated
