= Don Juan y Su Bella Dama =

- Genre: Telenovela
- Created by: Claudio Villarruel; Bernarda Llorente
- Starring: Joaquín Furriel; Romina Gaetani; Benjamín Vicuña; Isabel Macedo
- Theme music composer: Axel; Eduardo Frigerio
- Opening theme: Esa Dama- Yahir
- Country of origin: Argentina
- Original language: Spanish
- No. of episodes: 238

Production
- Camera setup: Multiple-camera setup
- Running time: 50-80 mins.

Original release
- Network: Telefe
- Release: March 17, 2008 – March 9, 2009

Related
- Lena - Liebe meines Lebens

Don Juan y Su Bella Dama (Don Juan and his fair Lady) is an Argentine 2008–09 telenovela, created and produced by Telefe. In this telenovela, lead roles were portrayed by Joaquín Furriel and Romina Gaetani.

The telenovela was adapted in 2010 as Lena - Liebe meines Lebens by Endemol for the German television channel ZDF.

== Plot ==
Juan meets Josefina when she almost runs over his grandmother Augusta with her bike, and falls in love with her. But Serena, his ambitious stepmother, won't stop until she makes Juan to fall in love with her.

Josefina's family is a very troubled one: her mother Alicia expulses her father Emilio from her house because he made police superintendent Eugenia Gutiérrez pregnant. Manuel, her handsome brother, feels pity for a prostitute and tries to help her, and becomes infuriated when he discovers that his malicious father Emilio raped and threatened her.

Josefina dates a Chilean man named Franco, who makes devilish plans with her father Emilio. She has to marry him because, supposedly, he's going to die.

== Cast ==
| Actor | Character |
|---|---|
| Joaquín Furriel | Juan Cané |
| Romina Gaetani | Josefina Molina |
| Benjamín Vicuña | Franco Ramírez Puente |
| Isabel Macedo | Graciela Monterrey/Serena Monterrey |
| Raúl Rizzo | Rafael Cané |
| Perla Santalla | Augusta Cané de Santillán |
| Carlos Moreno | Emilio Molina |
| Mónica Scaparone | Eugenia Gutiérrez |
| Silvia Baylé | Alicia Correa |
| Graciela Stefani | Yoli Correa |
| Silvina Acosta | Connie Vidal |
| Alejo Ortiz | César McKlean |
| Victoria Rauch | Carmela Linares |
| Dana Basso | Dorys Monterrey |
| Guido Massri | Manuel Molina |
| Gabo Correa | Asencio Tolosa |
| Michel Noher | Peter Fernández |
| Catalina Artusi | Micaela Muñoz |
| Diego Bugallo | Tommy Ramírez |
| Jorge Rivera López | Francisco Santillán |
| Melina Petriella | Mora |
| Juan Bautista Greppi | Felipe |
| Paula Morales | Penélope Contreras |
| Horacio Roca | Basilio |
| Malena Solda | Luciana Octaviano |
| Fabian Mazzei | Álex Molina |
| Gerardo Chendo | Pascual |
| Luis Ziembrowski | Gabriel Contreras |
| Rafael Ferro | Ezequiel Jordán |
| Cristian Pasman | Oliva |
| Bárbara Badía | Danila |
| María Fernanda Neil | Maite |
| Ricardo Bauleo | Renzo Capri |
| Luciano Brusco | Valentín Cané |
