= Tabea Heynig =

German actress

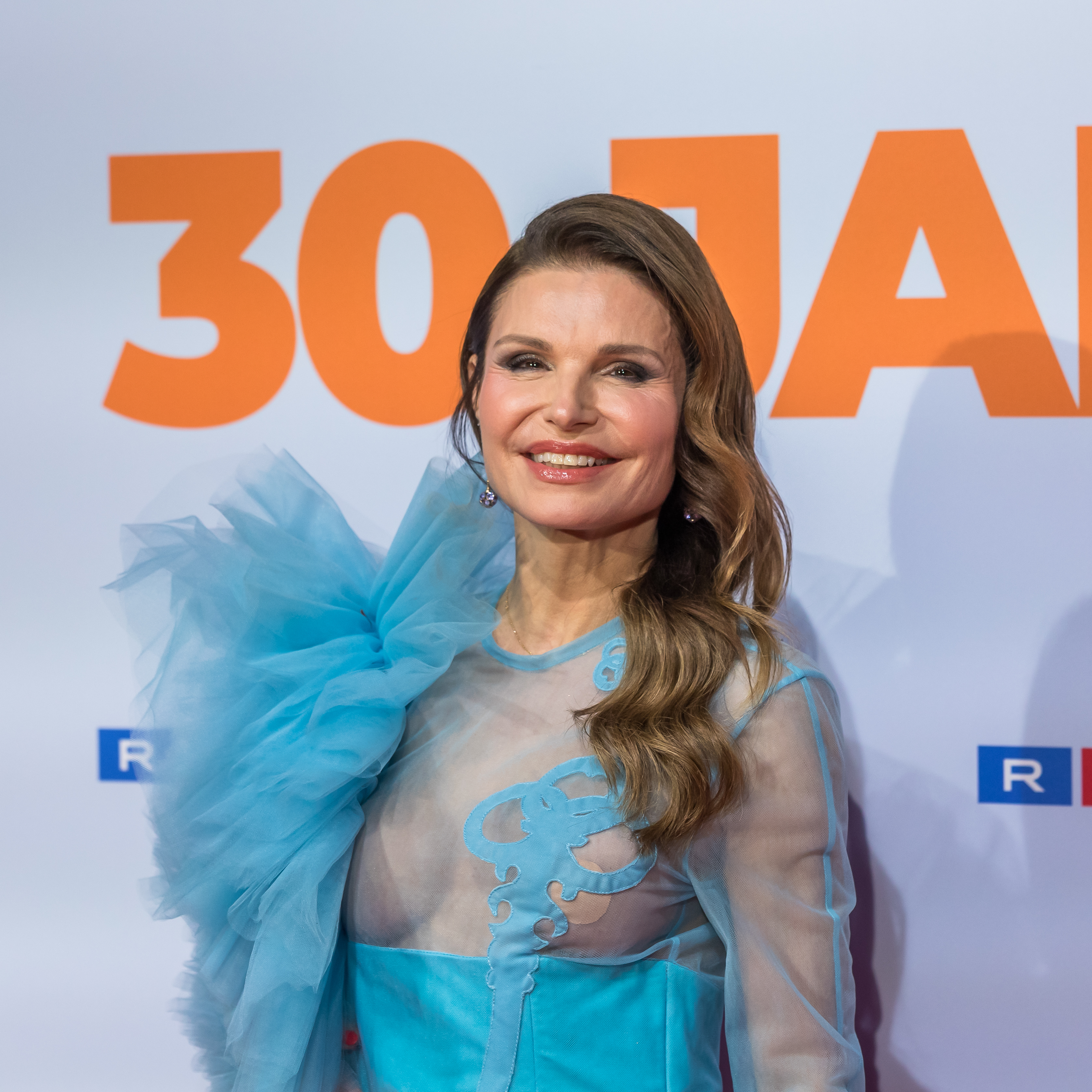
- Born: 18 July 1970 (age 55); Mannheim, Germany
- Occupation: Actress
- Children: 1

Tabea Heynig (born 18 July 1970) is a German actress.

== Career ==
After graduating from high school, Heynig worked as a model in Milan for a few years, then completed an apprenticeship as an actress from 1993 to 1996 at the Zerboni drama school in Munich.

From 29 August 2006, she took part in the ARD soap opera Verbotene Liebe, where she played the role of the French teacher Anne Siebert, in which she could be seen until 27 April 2007. Since 22 January 2010 she can be seen in the lead role Britta Schönfeld in Unter uns. At the beginning of 2015, she was with Alexander Sholti, Petra Blossey and Benjamin Heinrich at The Perfect Celebrity Dinner Among Us Special.

== Personal life ==
Heynig has been married since January 2018 and had their first son in February 2018 at the age of 47.

== Filmography ==
- 1993: Derrick (TV Series)
- 1995: Schwurgericht (TV Series)
- 1996: Wildbach (TV Series)
- 1997: Die Sexfalle (TV)
- 1997: Polizeiruf 110: Im Netz der Spinne (TV)
- 1997: Zwei Brüder – Tödliche Träume (TV)
- 1998: Der gerade Weg (TV)
- 1998: Aus heiterem Himmel (TV Series)
- 1998: Samt und Seide (TV Series)
- 1999: Der Student
- 1999: Wechselspiele
- 1999: Flush & Brush
- 1999: Operation Bluebird
- 2000: Forsthaus Falkenau (TV Series, one episode)
- 2001: 666 – Traue keinem, mit dem du schläfst!
- 2002: Friends of Friends
- 2004: Vinzent
- 2006–2007: Verbotene Liebe (TV Series)
- 2006: Zwei Engel für Amor
- 2007: Madness Is Catching
- 2008: Wilsberg: Filmriss
- since 2010: Unter uns (TV Series)
