= Nicole Mieth =

German actress

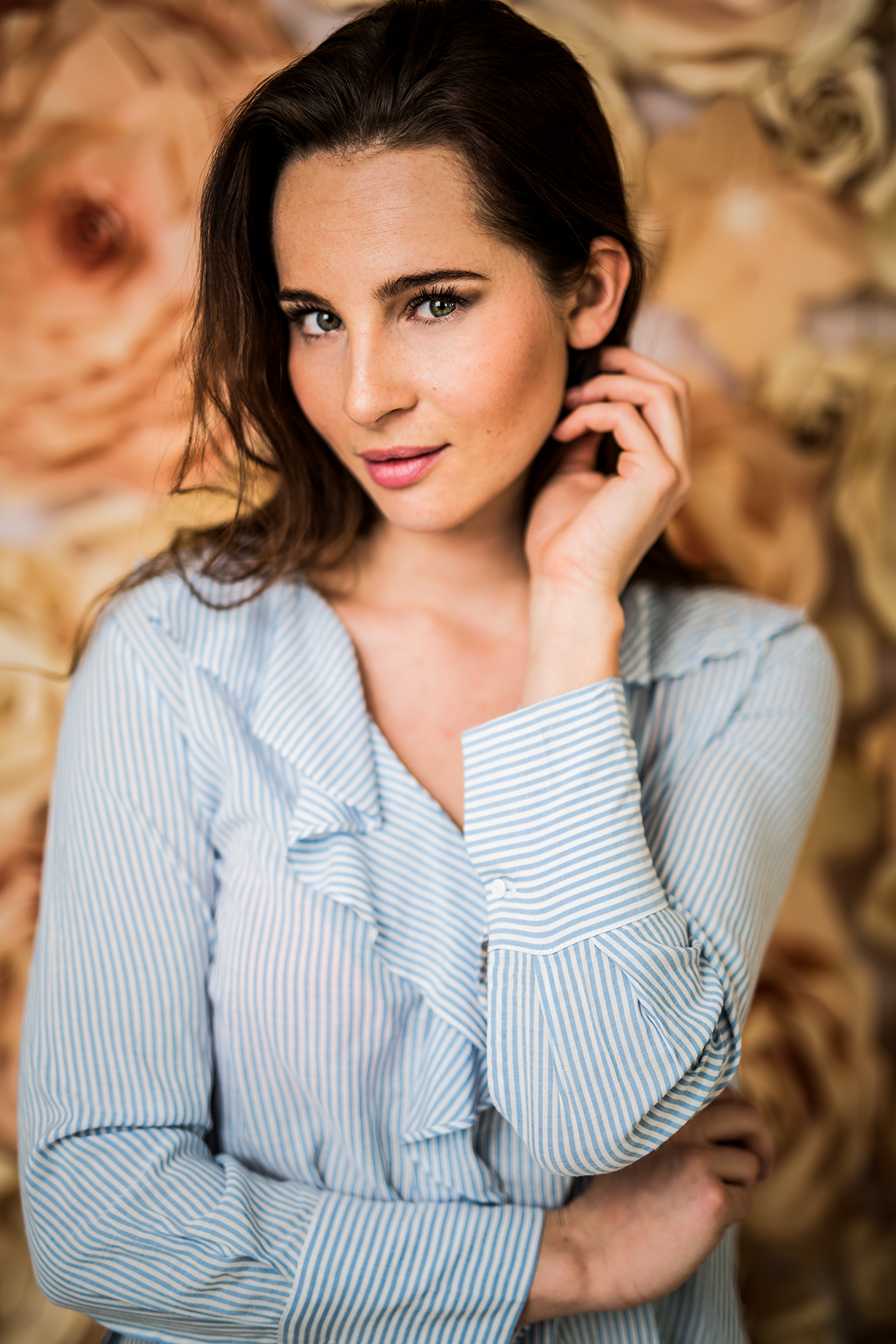
- Mieth in 2018
- Born: 23 July 1990 (age 34); Calw, Germany
- Occupation: Actress
- Website: nicole-mieth.info

Nicole Mieth (born 23 July 1990) is a German actress.

== Life and career ==
Born in Calw, Mieth grew up in an artistic environment and is the granddaughter of actor Benno Mieth.

Mieth has acted in various television films and television series. In 2001, her debut role was Lilli Leonhard in the television film Herzstolpern, a romantic comedy produced for ZDF. Mieth played the role of Emma Jacobsson in the television film Sehnsucht nach Marielund (2003), the opening film of the successful Inga Lindström television series. In the Das Traumschiff episode Samoa she played the role of the young Marlene Haas.

She has had episode-appearances in the series Der letzte Zeuge, Im Namen des Gesetzes, Unser Charly and Cologne P.D.. From 2008 to 2011, Mieth completed acting training at the International Drama Academy CreArte in Stuttgart. In April 2011, she acted in the ZDF crime series Die Rosenheim-Cops in an episode role as Julia Kammermeier. In May 2011, (episode 3837) she took over the role of Kim Wolf in the Daily Soap Verbotene Liebe on ARD and continued in the role until the end of the series in June 2015.

Mieth has appeared in commercials, including for BMW and Osram. She also had two YouTube channels, which are now both inactive.

In January 2017, she participated in Season 11 of Ich bin ein Star – Holt mich hier raus! and took ninth place. Before moving into the jungle camp, she completed a shoot for the February 2017 issue of German Playboy. Mieth took part in an episode of Das perfekte Promi-Dinner in March 2017.

In June 2017, Mieth moved from Stuttgart to Vienna.

== Filmography ==
=== Films ===
- 2001: Herzstolpern
- 2003: Inga Lindström: – Sehnsucht nach Marielund
- 2004: Das Traumschiff – Samoa

=== Series ===
- 2001: Herzschlag – Das Ärzteteam Nord
- 2003: Tatort – Das Phantom
- 2004: Cologne P.D. – Oliver W, Death of a Student
- 2004: Der letzte Zeuge – The Forgotten Death
- 2004: Im Namen des Gesetzes – In Acquittal Murder
- 2004: Stefanie
- 2005: Cologne P.D. – The Sniper
- 2005: Tatort: Der doppelte Lott
- 2006: Unser Charly
- 2009: Muetze (pilot film)
- 2011: Die Rosenheim-Cops – Inheritance with Consequences
- 2011: Aktenzeichen XY… ungelöst
- 2011–15: Verbotene Liebe

=== Reality TV ===
- 2017: Ich bin ein Star – Holt mich hier raus!
- 2017: Das perfekte Promi-Dinner (episode from 19 Mar)
