= Jörn Schlönvoigt =

German actor and singer

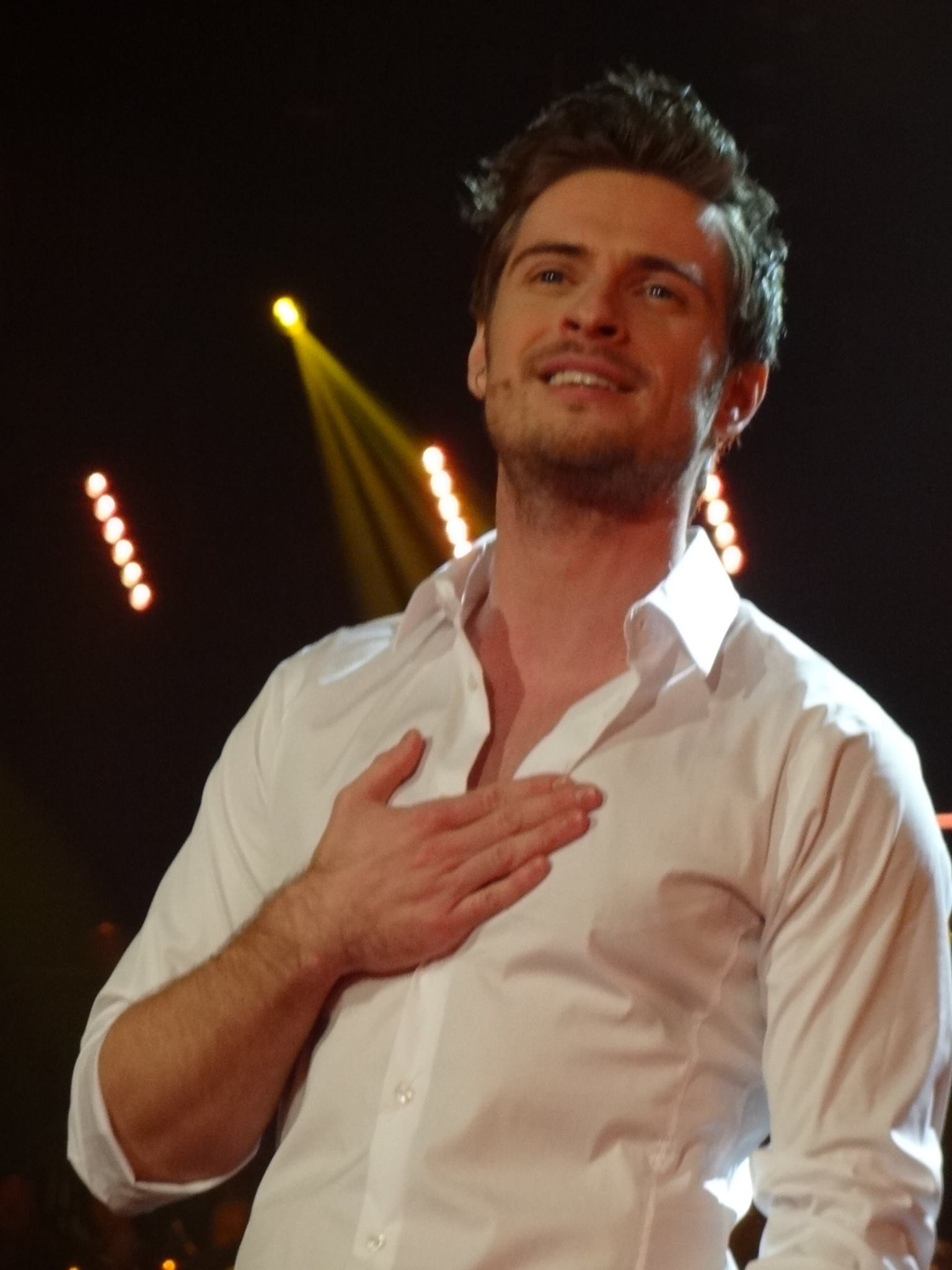
- Schlönvoigt in 2015
- Born: 1 August 1986 (age 39); East Berlin, East Germany
- Occupations: Actor; singer
- Years active: 2004–present
- Website: joernschloenvoigt.de

Jörn Schlönvoigt ([jœʁn ˈʃløːnˌfoːkt]; born 1 August 1986) is a German actor and singer who became popular through the soap opera "Gute Zeiten, Schlechte Zeiten".

== Early life and his career ==
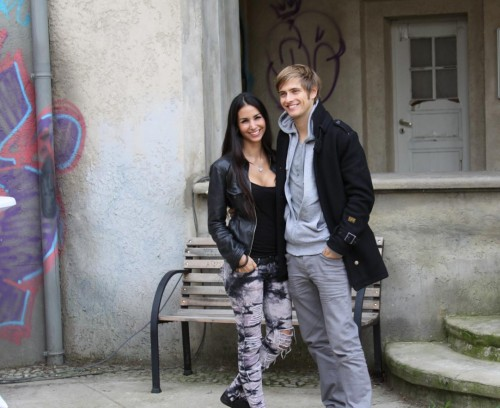
Schlönvoigt with his then-girlfriend Sıla Şahin (2010)

Schlönvoigt was born in Köpenick, East Berlin. When Schlönvoigt was eleven years old, he began to write his own lyrics and started rapping. At 16, he formed a punk rock band called Cherry Poppers with his half-brother. The band won the german Radio Fritz! contest. After he had achieved the "Mittlere Reife", Jörn Schlönvoigt began his apprenticeship as a wholesale and foreign trade merchant. He never ended this apprenticeship, due to appearing in the german soap opera "Gute Zeiten, Schlechte Zeiten" (Good times, Bad times). He also worked as an extra in different series "Schloss Einstein" (castle Einstein in episode 325 and 326) and "Alphateam – Die Lebensretter im OP" (Alphateam – the lifesavers in the operating theatre). Later, Schlönvoigt modeled for different prospects.

On 7 September 2007, Schlönvoigt released his debut single "Das Gegenteil von Liebe" ("The Opposite of Love"), which became successful in Germany. Later that November, he released a second single. On 25 January 2008, Schlönvoigt released his third single, "Ein Leben lang" ("A Lifetime"), which was also the image song of the german network RTL. His first album was released on 28 September 2007.

In 2008, Schlönvoigt starred in Gute Zeiten, Schlechte Zeiten, where his character was paired with the role of Lucy Cöster (Sarah Tkotsch). In April 2009, their management announced that Tkotsch and Schlönvoigt had become a couple in real life.

Jörn Schlönvoigt and Sarah Tkotsch separated in 2010. Jörn began dating Sıla Şahin in 2011. However, the couple separated in February 2013.

== Filmography (selection) ==
- since 2004: 'Gute Zeiten, schlechte Zeiten' (German soap-opera, since episode 3114-)
- 2010: 'Familie Fröhlich – Schlimmer geht immer' (German movie, translated Family Fröhlich – worse is always possible)
- 2016: 'Notruf Hafenkante' (German series, translated emergency call harbour edge, episode 'In Hamburg essen Sie Hunde', translated: In Hamburg they eat dogs)
- 2016: 'Notruf Hafenkante' (German series, episode 'Crystal')
- 2018: Beck is back! (one episode)
- 2019: 'Verstehen Sie Spaß?' (German prank show, translated word by word 'Can you take a joke?')

== Discography ==
=== Albums ===
Year	Title	Charts			Information
Year	Title	GER	AUT	SWI	Information
2007	Jörn Schlönvoigt	48	—	76	Published: 28 September 2007
2014	Für immer und ewig	55	—	—	Published: 17 October 2014
2017	Tausend Wunder	—	—	—	Published: 11 August 2017

=== Singles ===
Year	Title	Charts			Information
Year	Title	GER	AUT	SWI	Information
2007	Das Gegenteil von Liebe	8	21	50	Published: 7 September 2007
2007	Superhelden sterben nicht	88	—	—	Published: 30 November 2007
2008	Ein Leben lang	41	—	—	Published: 25 January 2008

== Awards ==
- 2006 – 'Golden Bravo Otto' in the category 'male TV star'
- 2007 – 'Silver Bravo Otto' in the category 'male TV star'
- 2008 – 'Golden CMA Wild and Young Award' in the category best soap actor.
- 2008 – 'Silver CMA Wild and Young Award' in the category best singer
- 2009 – 'Golden CMA Wild and Young Award' as the best soap actor
- 2014 – smago! Award as Every Generation's Audience Favourite
