= Kostas Sommer =

Actor and TV presenter

- Born: Oliver Tino Sommer; May 17, 1975 (age 51); Germany
- Education: German School of Athens; UCLA
- Occupations: Actor, TV Host, Model, Entrepreneur
- Website: www.kostasommer.com/

Kostas Sommer (Greek: Κώστας Σόμμερ) is a Greek actor and television host who has appeared in numerous movies and TV shows. In 2005, he appeared in the Hollywood film Deuce Bigalow: European Gigolo starring Rob Schneider, as the Greek gigolo Assapopoulos Mariolis. The role was Sommer's first Hollywood role, after his only audition since arriving in Los Angeles.

== Life and career ==
Sommer was born in Germany, to a German-born Greek father, from Crete, and a German mother. Sommer spent most of his childhood years in Germany and later moved to Greece. Sommer attended the German School of Athens. He was bitten by the acting bug as a young boy and continued working in television and film in Greece. He started modeling at age 12 and graduated of UCLA (Arts and Psychology) in 1997.

He is a very well known Greek celebrity appearing in numerous magazines and commercials before participating in big screen film productions such as Brides by Pantelis Voulgaris, The Boston Strangler, A Breath's Distance, Golden Beach and Extreme Sommer. Some of his television credits include Love Came From Afar, Soko Germany. He has also appeared in several Broadway plays include playing the part of Joe Bonaparte in Golden Boy and Liliom. He enjoys extreme sports as well as skydiving, jetski, speed boat, car and motorcycle racing/stunts. He currently lives between Athens and Los Angeles. He was starring in the Greek TV series Tis Agapis Maheria (Greek: Της αγάπης μαχαιριά), (The Knives of Love) by Stratos Markidis for ANT1. This series had a personal connection to Kostas since the story is based in Cretan traditions. Kostas is also a very renowned lobbyist, active in the political as well as the business genre with many substantial deals and connections to his name. In 2019 he ran for a member of the European Parliament, and in 2023 for Regional Councillor for the Region of Attica.

== Personal life ==
In early 2000s, Sommer had been in a relationship with tv presenter Gogo Mastrokosta. From 2015 to 2019, Sommer had been in a relationship with model-actress Nafsika Panagiotakopoulou.
On August 25, 2021, Sommer married makeup artist Valentine Papadaki after two years of being in a relationship. They have two children: a son, Jason (b. September 2, 2021) and a daughter, Simone (b. December 22, 2022).

== Filmography ==
Television
Year	Title	Role	Notes
2002–2003	I Agapi Irthe Apo Makria	Ilia	Lead role, TV debut
2003–2004	Apostasi Anapnois	Aris	Lead role
2004–2005	To Spiti Dipla Sti Thalassa		Lead role
2006	Available Men	Stephen	TV movie
2006	To Kokkino Domatio	Stratos	Episode: "I Diva"
2006	Safe Sex TV Stories	Stavros	Episode: "I Gravata"
2006–2007	Tis Agapis Mahairia	Sifis Stamatakis	Lead role
2008	Show Sexy	Himself	Host
2009	Xtreme Sommer	Himself	Host, Producer
2010–2011	Lena – Liebe meines Lebens	Tony Weiss	Lead role, 180 episodes
2011–2012	Einai Stigmes		Lead role
2015	SOKO München	Dietmar Kruse	Episode: "Herzblut"
2015	Summer in Greece	Kostas Katakis	TV movie
2016	Der Athen Krimi - Trojanische Pferde	Raffael	TV movie
2016–2017	Prodosies	Peter Theofanous	Lead role
2017	Survival Secret	Himself	Host
2018	The Show World	Panos	epidode : Years Body Tattoo Show Party
2019	Star Foodies! Greece Edition	Himself	Guest star, 1 episode

Cinema
Year	Title	Role	Notes
2005	Deuce Bigalow: European Gigolo	Manolis Assasopoulos	
2008	Boston Strangler: The Untold Story	Frank Asarian	
2008	Deep End	Nikos	
2009	Shoot the Duke	Harry	
2012	God Loves Caviar		
2015	O Klearhos, i Marina & o Kontos		
2019	Berlin, I Love You	Agent	
