= Ricos y Famosos =

- Genre: Telenovela
- Created by: Alejandro Romay
- Written by: Oscar Ibarra; Daniel Delbene; Adriana Lorenzón
- Directed by: Hugo Moser; Martín Clutet
- Starring: Natalia Oreiro; Diego Ramos; Jessica Schultz; Arnaldo Andre; Oscar Ferreiro; Leonor Benedetto; Antonio Grimau; Millie Stegman
- Opening theme: Dos Almas by Víctor Heredia
- Country of origin: Argentina
- Original language: Spanish
- No. of seasons: 2
- No. of episodes: 517

Production
- Executive producer: Darío Álvarez
- Producer: Telearte
- Production location: Buenos Aires
- Running time: 45 minutos

Original release
- Network: Canal 9
- Release: January 6, 1997 – 1998

Related
- 90 60 90 Modelos

Ricos y Famosos (Rich and Famous) is an Argentine telenovela. Issued between January 1997 and December 1998 in two seasons of more than 175 chapters each. The first season was starring Natalia Oreiro, Diego Ramos, Oscar Ferreiro, Antonio Grimau and Jessica Schultz. The second season was starring Arnaldo André, Leonor Benedetto, Oscar Ferreiro, Millie Stegman and Jessica Schultz, being broadcast by Canal 9.

== Plot ==
It began as a love story between two boys who, by a bad move from his father, the two families were confronted and the love they felt was difficult to carry out without being separated. As the series progressed, the narrative increasingly favored antagonists over protagonists. The protagonists introduced include Valeria (Natalia Oreiro) and Diego (Diego Ramos). Much of the show composed of evil being dominant over good. This show also used the character of Carla from the show Por siempre mujercitas, and she worked with Diego's father Salerno. It was the first time that a character moved from one soap opera to another in Argentina, without either of them having any relationship.

== Cast ==
=== Season 1 ===
- Natalia Oreiro as Valeria García Méndez de Salerno
- Diego Ramos as Diego Salerno Ortigoza
- Antonio Grimau as Alberto García Méndez
- Norberto Díaz as Darío Servente
- Jessica Schultz as Elena Flores
- Segundo Cernadas as Agustín García Méndez
- Carina Zampini as Carla Lucero
- Karina Buzeki as Sabrina Servente
- Bettina O'Conell as Trinidad "Trini" Etcheverry
- Oscar Ferreiro as Luciano Salerno
- Elizabeth Killian as Martha García Méndez
- Diego Olivera as Julián
- Dolores Fonzi as Yoli
- Cecilia Maresca as Berta / Mercedes
- Graciela Pal as Olga
- Lorena Paola as Teresita
- Leonardo Calandra as Tico
- Hernán Echeverría as Pablo
- Juan Ignacio Machado as Rubén
- Celina Font as Mónica
- Raúl Florido as Fermín
- María Ángeles Medrano as Paula

=== Season 2 ===
- Arnaldo Andre as Gerardo Murúa
- Jessica Schultz as Elena Flores
- Oscar Ferreiro as Luciano Salerno
- Millie Stegman as Sandra Quiroga
- Leonor Benedetto as Raquel Falconi
- Betiana Blum as Emilia
- Aldo Barbero as Maldonado
- Juan Ignacio Machado as Rubén
- Celina Font as Mónica
- Raúl Florido as Fermín
- Julieta Fazzari as Celina
- Salo Pasik as Gómez
- Héctor Da Rosa as Cardozo
- Alfonso De Grazia as Simón

=== Special Participations ===
- Carolina Papaleo as Estella Izaguirre
- Catalina Artusi as Mili
- Isabel Macedo as Isabel
- Gustavo Guillén as Rodrigo
- Juan Vitali as Julio Romero
- Paola Papini as Irene
- Paula Siero as Aixa
- Federico Luppi
- Dorita Ferreyro
- Carlos Mena
- Carola Reyna
- China Zorrilla
- Raúl Lavié
- María Encarnación Gutiérrez
- Osvaldo Brandi
- Víctor Bruno
- Daniela Cardone
- Hugo Cosiansi
- Judith Gabbani
- Nacho Gadano
- Osvaldo Sabatini
- Denise Dumas
- Humberto Serrano
- Viviana Sáez
- Víctor Hugo Vieyra
- Daniel Alhadeff
- Silvina Rada
- Daniel Cano
