= Christine Reimer =

Danish folklorist, journalist and writer

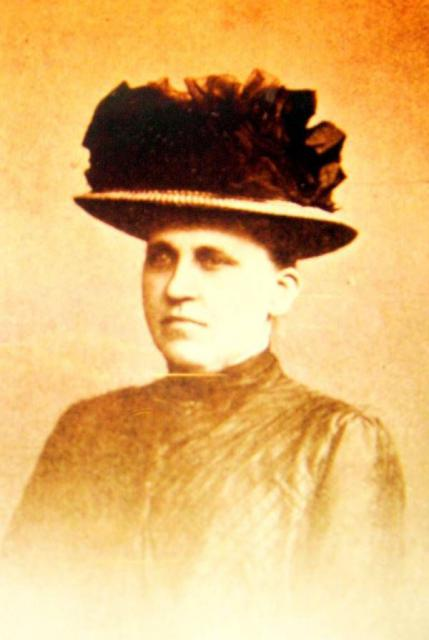
Christine Reimer

Signe Christine Antoinette Manna Reimer (1858–1943) was a Danish journalist and writer who is remembered in particular for her interest in folklore. Her five-volume Nordfynsk Bondeliv i Mands Minde (1910–1919) describes the way of life, customs and language of ordinary people in the rural communities of north Funen. The work is considered to be one of the most important historical records of Danish folklore and related traditions. She bequeathed her own collection of artefacts to Nordfyns Museum in Bogense.

== Early life and education ==
Born on 15 April 1858 in Hårslev Parish near Bogense on the island of Funen, Signe Christine Antoinette Manna Reimer was the daughter of Hans Bertel Reimer (1800–1872), a school master, and his wife Kirsten Poulsdatter (1827–1920). She had two half brothers from her father's first marriage. Brought up in a well-to-do family, after attending her father's school in Hårslev, when she was nine she moved to her half-brother Alexander's home in Viborg where she spent five years at Wissing's Girls School. She was also trained in office work and bookkeeping by her brother, a local official. When her father died in 1872, she moved back to Hårslev to live with her mother. From 1880, she spent three years at the home of her second half brother, Anton, who was a pastor, tutoring his three children.

== Professional life ==
Reimer taught in Herning until 1886 when she devoted her summers to looking after guest houses, opening her own establishment in Hellebæk in the 1890s. She was able to spend her winters developing her interest in local traditions and folklore.

In 1897, she settled with her mother in Odense and began to seriously devote herself to writing, taking a special interest in folklore and local language and traditions. She improved her knowledge of the field by visiting libraries and archives and meet with older people to discuss their past. Writing some 150 articles a year, she presented her ideas on good housekeeping, publishing Hjemmets Bog (Book of the Home) in 1908 which also included old sayings and poems and described some of the local housekeeping traditions she had experienced.

In 1910, Reimer published the first volume of her celebrated work Nordfynsk Bondeliv i Mands Minde. As a result of her own poor health and the pressures of the First World War, the fifth volume did not appear until 1919. She had set out to show that folk traditions should not only be a topic for academics from Copenhagen but could be addressed by interested authors in the provinces. She succeeded in her enterprise, receiving wide acclaim from recognized authorities. After her mother's death in 1920, Reimer could not find the strength to write more books but until the end of her life she continued to contribute articles to journals.

Christine Reimer died in Odense on 13 December 1943. She left her folkloric artefacts to the Nordfyn Museum in Bodense and bequeathed her collection of some 5,000 sayings, proverbs and examples of local dialect to the Udvalg for Folkemaal og Dansk Folkemindesamling, the Danish folklore archives.
