= Konrad Krauss =

German actor (born 1938)

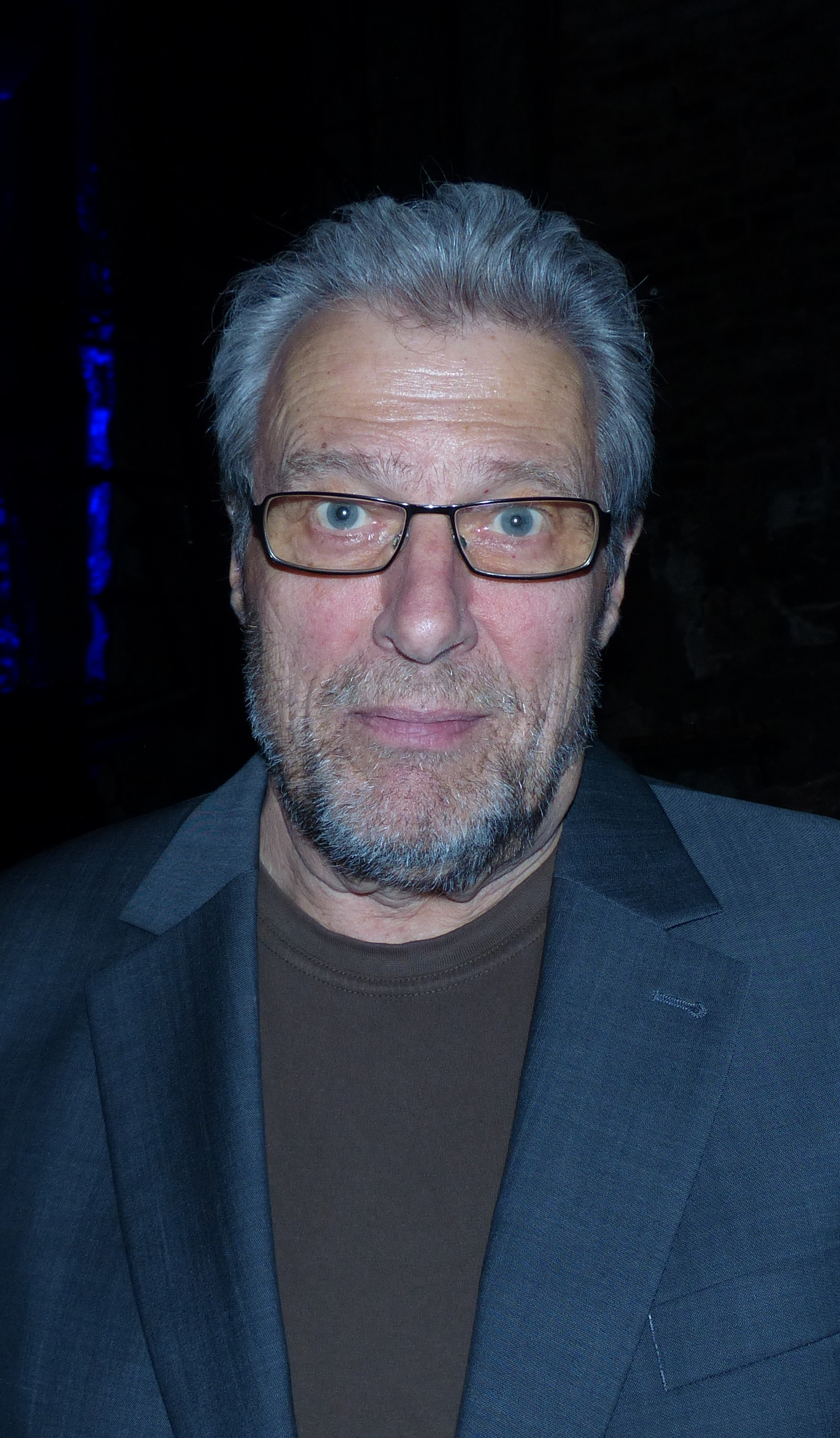
- Krauss in 2013
- Born: 30 May 1938 (age 87); Wilhelmshaven, Lower Saxony, Germany
- Occupation: Actor

Konrad Krauss (born 30 May 1938 in Wilhelmshaven) is a German actor, known for his role as family patriarch Arno Brandner on the soap opera Verbotene Liebe (Forbidden Love).

Krauss studied drama and music on the Hochschule für Musik und Theater Hamburg. In 1960, he played Angel Raphael in a Faust screening. Krauss was seen in various plays and had many guest appearances on television. His life changed when he joined Verbotene Liebe in 1995.

In 2006, his friend and actor fellow Uwe Friedrichsen made a guest appearance to give Arno new optimism.
