= Ulrike Röseberg =

German actress

- Born: 15 October 1978 (age 46); Friedrichshain, East Berlin, East Germany
- Occupation: Actress

Ulrike Röseberg (born 15 October 1978) is a German stage and television actress.

== Career ==
After graduating from high school, Röseberg completed her acting studies in the Brandenburg state capital Potsdam at the Konrad Wolf Film University of Babelsberg at Babelsberg Studio, where she graduated with a diploma. After her permanent engagement at the Salzburger Landestheater, she performed in many theaters, including the Bregenzer Landestheater and the Klosterruine Boitzenburg. The role of Annette Bergmann in the television series Alles was zählt, which she portrayed from 2006 to 2012, was her first major television role; on 1 June 2012 her character was killed off in episode 1445. Since then, she has appeared in various television series, including Heiter bis tödlich: Zwischen den Zeilen, Cologne P.D., SOKO Leipzig and Block B - Unter Arrest.

== Personal life ==
In August 2013, Röseberg entered into a registered civil partnership with her long-time friend Franzi. On 5 February 2021, she took part in the #ActOut initiative in SZ-Magazin with 184 other lesbian, gay, bisexual, queer, non-binary and transgender actors.
