= Hand aufs Herz =

- Genre: Soap opera
- Country of origin: Germany
- Original language: German
- No. of episodes: 234

Production
- Running time: 30 minutes

Original release
- Network: Sat.1 (episodes 1-213) sixx (episodes 214-234)
- Release: October 4, 2010 – September 5, 2011

Hand aufs Herz (Hand on Heart) is a German soap opera that premiered on October 4, 2010 on the private broadcasting station Sat.1. It got canceled in June 2011, announcing the series finale for September 5, 2011. However that changed when Sat.1 decided to drop the show from its line-up and sixx was announced to air the remaining episodes; with a one-hour series finale on September 2, 2011.

The show focuses around a fictional high school in Cologne, and tackles with young love, a marriage crisis, a mysterious disappearance, schemes and competition fights, coming out, drug abuse, career chances and forbidden feelings. Hand aufs Herz also introduces something completely new to the genre of a soap opera by including music and dance as one of the main elements.

It has been compared to the successful American television shows Big Time Rush and Glee, as well as the High School Musical franchise. Even though it started out as a musical series, the show shifts its stories from that plot even though it remains a part of the series.

Hand aufs Herz started two weeks after the failed daily drama Eine wie keine aired its final episode due to low ratings. The show is in direct competition with the long-running soap opera Verbotene Liebe (Forbidden Love) and is starring with Vanessa Jung and Andreas Jancke two of its former stars.

It was created by the writer/producer Petra Bodenbach. The show also aired in Austria on ORF1 on schedule with the airing in Germany.

== Plot ==
After finishing her schooling in Munich, Beate Vogel (Vanessa Jung) becomes the new music and singing teacher at her former school, the Pestalozzi comprehensive school. On her first day of work she literally crashes into her new colleague Michael Heisig (Andreas Jancke), leading to a first encounter that begins a journey. Though, not everyone is in happy at the idea of Beate's return to the school where she once was a student. The sports coach turns out to be Bea's former schoolmate Alexandra Lohmann (Verena Mundhenke), who holds Beate responsible for the mysterious disappearance of her sister. Alexandra and the vice principal, Julian Götting (Sebastian Hölz), plot against Bea and her mentor Gabriele Krawcyk (Marie Schneider), the principal of the Pestalozzi comprehensive school. Furthermore, Julian has his own motives in helping Alexandra as he's actively after Gabriele's job.

When Bea takes a look at the school choir, she soon learns that much has changed at her former school. What was once the flagship activity has now been pushed aside by the beach volleyball team. Nevertheless, Beate is excited when she learns that a student, Luzi Beschenko (Selina Müller), wants to form a music study group together with her fellow students Dennis Horstfeld (Dennis Schigiol) and Emma Müller (Kasia Borek). They only need a teacher to supervise the group. With much enthusiasm, Bea decides to make the music study group her first project. Much to the anger of Caro Eichkamp (Sonja Bertram), the it girl of the school and star of the beach volleyball team, who thinks the formation of a music study group will lessen the influence she has at the school. Together with her best friend Sophie (Franciska Friede), she tries to manipulate and expose the newly formed study group.

After a first long day of work, Beate spends the evening at a club called "Chulo’s" with her best friend Miriam (Caroline Maria Frier), the wife of her brother Piet (Oliver Petszokat). This is where she meets the attractive young Ben Bergmann (Christopher Kohn). Bea and Ben spend a passionate night together. However, Beate gets the shock of her life when Ben is introduced to her as one of her new students. A dangerous fiery game begins, in which Ben is still fascinated by Bea, even though she's his teacher.

== Cast ==
The protagonist was without a doubt Vanessa Jung in her part as teacher Bea Vogel, who had a forbidden love affair with her student, Ben Bergmann, played by Christopher Kohn. While Sebastian Hölz as Julian Götting, Verena Mundhenke as Alexandra Lohmann and Dennis Schigiol as Hotte Horstfeld left the series early, others were added to the main cast. Most important newcomers through the series were Lucy Scherer as Jenny Hartmann, who was involved in a popular lesbian storyline with Emma Müller, played by Kasia Borek, and Kim-Sarah Brandts as Michael's wife Helena.

Actor	Character	Duration
Sonja Bertram	Caro Eichkamp	2010-2011
Kasia Borek	Emma Müller	2010-2011
Hendrik Borgmann	Frank Peters	2011
Kim-Sarah Brandts	Helena Schmidt-Heisig	2011
Ulrich Drewes	Stefan Bergmann	2010-2011
Franciska Friede	Sophie Klein	2010-2011
Caroline Maria Frier	Miriam Vogel	2010-2011
Frederic Heidorn	Ronnie Peters	2011
Sebastian Hölz	Julian Götting	2010-2011
Andreas Jancke	Michael Heisig	2010-2011
Vanessa Jung	Beate Vogel	2010-2011
Matthias Kofler	Bastian Heisig	2010-2011
Christopher Kohn	Ben Bergmann	2010-2011
Amelie Plaas Link	Lara Vogel	2010-2011
Selina Müller	Luzi Beschenko	2010-2011
Verena Mundhenke	Alexandra Lohmann	2010-2011
Oliver Petszokat	Piet Vogel	2010-2011
Lucy Scherer	Jenny Hartmann	2011
Dennis Schigiol	Dennis "Hotte" Horstfeld	2010-2011
Marie Schneider	Gabriele Krawczyk	2010-2011
Barbara Sotelsek	Karin Beschenko	2010-2011
Rocco Stark	Timo Özgül	2010-2011
Franziska Traub	Ingrid Jäger	2010-2011
Frank Ziegler	Bodo Wilhelmsen	2011

== Reception & Ratings ==
The show's first episodes were generally favorable reviewed, with some saying that the project was a bold move while others praised its realistic setting. However, viewers criticized the fact that the show's characters, other than Bea and Ben, showed signs of being stereotypes. Hand aufs Herz debuted with 1.29 million viewers and closed its first week with 1.19 million viewers; giving a constant performance in the ratings. The debut of the soap did not reflect in the ratings of its time-slot competitor Verbotene Liebe (Forbidden Love).

Hand aufs Herz had a huge following online; making it difficult to get an audience through television. The series had high numbers in the online viewings, making nearly 50 percent of its entire audience. When the show was canceled, fans were outraged and disappointed through various fan boards and let the industry know how much they loved the show.
