= Lili Gesler =

Hungarian actress (born 1980)

- Born: 22 October 1980 (age 46); Budapest, Hungary
- Occupation: Actress
- Years active: 1999–present

Lili Gesler (born 22 October 1980) is a Hungarian actress.

== Filmography ==
- 2000: Trautmann (TV series, episode: Wer heikel ist bleibt übrig)
- 2003: The Salmon of the St Laurence Rivers
- 2005: Csudafilm
- 2007: Der Henker
- 2007: Robin Hood (TV series)
- 2008: Das Buch von Dorka
- 2009: Die Wanderhure (TV series)
- 2010: Gerichtsmediziner Dr. Leo Dalton (Silent Witness, TV series)
- 2010–2011: Jóban Rosszban (TV series)
- 2011: Die Legende
- 2011–2012: Sturm der Liebe (Telenovela)

== Theater ==
- 1999/2000: Romeo und Juliet – Julia
- 2004/05: The Sound of Music – Lisl
- 2006: Viel Lärm um Nichts – Hero
- 2007: Brilliant traces – Rosannah
- 2008: Madame Poe – Miss Poe
- 2009: Ben Hur Live – Esther
- 2011: Blood Brothers – Mia
