= Joaquín Furriel =

Argentine actor (born 1974)

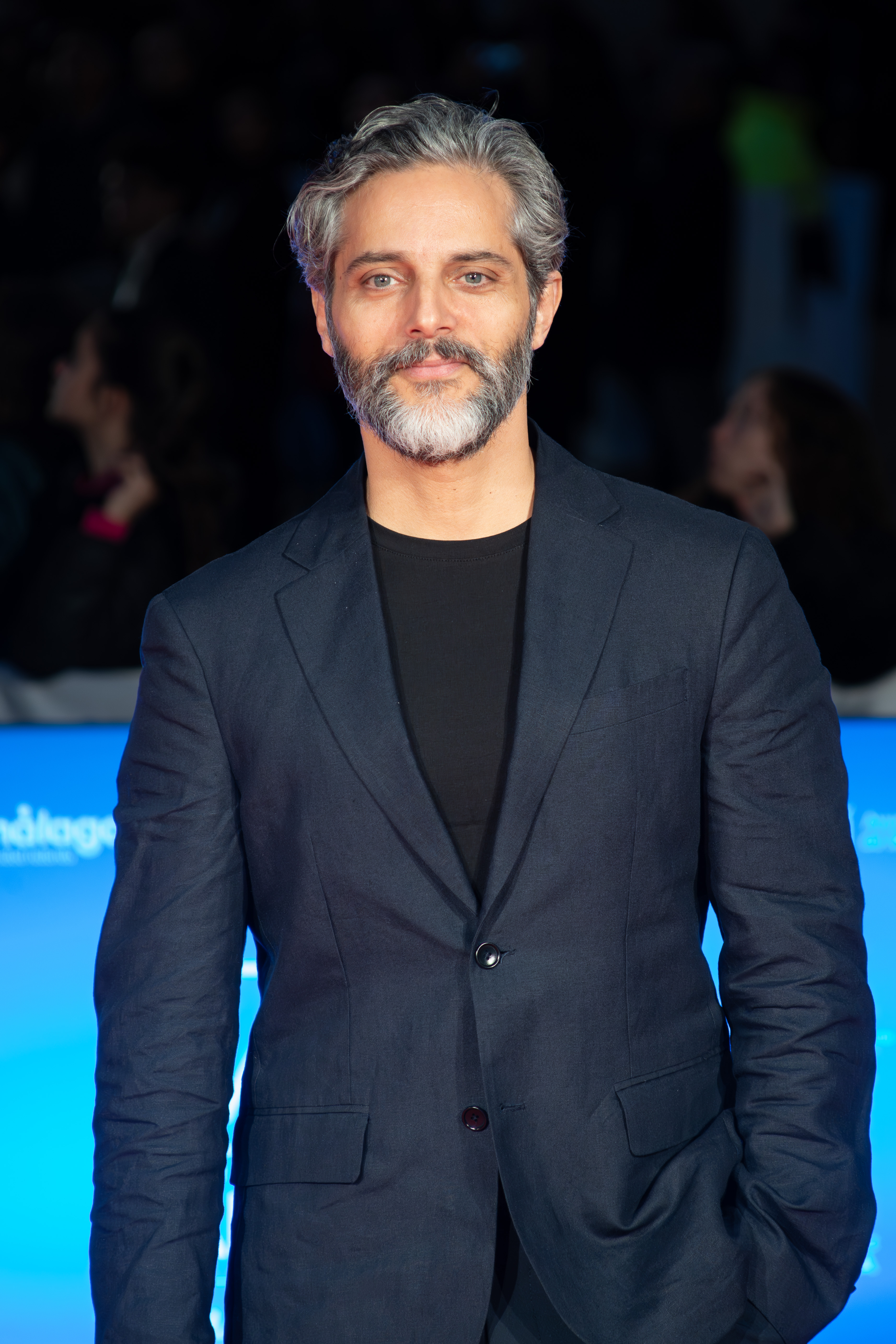
- Furriel in 2024
- Born: Joaquín Alejandro Furriel; August 26, 1974 (age 51); Lomas de Zamora, Buenos Aires Province, Argentina
- Occupation: Actor
- Years active: 1994-present
- Spouse: Paola Krum (m. 2005; div. 2011)
- Partner: Eva De Dominici (2016-2018)
- Children: 1

Joaquín Alejandro Furriel (born August 26, 1974) is an Argentine actor.

== Biography ==
Joaquín Furriel was born on August 26, 1974, in Lomas de Zamora, Buenos Aires Province, but he grew up in Adrogué, Gran Buenos Aires. At the age of thirteen, he participated in the theater in an existing workshop in his school and from then joined the Comedia de Almirante Brown. Years later, he studied at the Conservatorio de Arte Dramático and this allowed him to participate in international festivals.

== Career ==
He has worked in the telenovela Entre caníbales. His performance in the movie Lighthouse of the Orcas (El Faro de Las Orcas) has been pronounced worthy of accolades.

== Personal life ==
In 2005, he started a relationship with the actress Paola Krum. They married and after six years divorced on May 24, 2011. They have a daughter named Eloísa Furriel Krum.

In 2015, he suffered a Stroke.

From 2016 to 2018, he was in a relationship with the actress Eva De Dominici.

== Filmography ==
=== Theater ===
Year	Title	Character	Director	Theater
1994–1997	Juan Moreira Crimen y castigo		Igon Lerchumdi and Roberto Escobar	
1998	Tenesy		Daniel Marcove	Teatro Cervantes
1998	El Puente		Daniel Marcove	Teatro Cervantes
1999	Locos de verano		Daniel Marcove	Teatro Cervantes
2004	Don Chicho		Leonor Manso	Teatro Cervantes
2005	Sueño de una noche de verano		Alicia Zanca	Teatro San Martín
2005	La mala sangre		Laura Yusem	Teatro Regina and Nacional Tour
2008	Un guapo del 900		Eva Halac	Tour
2009	El reñidero		Eva Halac	Teatro Regio
2009–2010	Rey Lear		Rubén Szuchmacher	Teatro Apolo
2010–2011	La vida es sueño		Calixto Bieito	Teatro San Martín
2011–2012	Lluvia constante		Javier Daulte	Teatro La Plaza/Metropolitan
2013	Final de partida		Alfredo Alcón	Teatro San Martín

=== Television ===
Year	Title	Character	Channel
1996	Montaña rusa, otra vuelta	Judy Nail	El Trece
1998	La nocturna	Armando Esteban Quito	El Trece
2000	Calientes	Bruno	El Trece
2000	Verano del '98	Joaquín López Echagüe	Telefe
2001	El sodero de mi vida	Dany	El Trece
2002	099 Central	Lucas Morales	El Trece
2002	Final del juego	Germán	El Trece
2003	Soy gitano	Rafael "El Niño" Amaya	El Trece
2004	Jesús, el heredero	Jesús Reyes	El Trece
2005	Botines		El Trece
2005	Ambiciones	Yoni	Telefe
2006–2007	Montecristo	Marcos Lombardo	Telefe
2008–2009	Don Juan y su bella dama	Juan Cané	Telefe
2010	Caín y Abel	Agustín Vedia	Telefe
2011	Historias de la primera vez	Agustín	América TV
2012–2013	Sos mi hombre	Ariel Yamil "Turco" Nasif	El Trece
2013	Historias de corazón	Juan	Telefe
2014	Sres. Papis	Ignacio "Nacho" Moreno	Telefe
2015	Entre caníbales	Rafael Valmora	Telefe
2017	El jardín de bronce	Fabián Danubio	HBO
2021	El reino	Rubén Osorio	Netflix
2026	Billionaire's Bunker	Guillermo Falcón	Netflix

=== Movies ===
Year	Movie	Character	Director
2004	1420, la aventura de educar	Storyteller	
2010	Ni Dios, ni patrón, ni marido		
2011	Verano maldito	Federico	
2013	Un paraíso para los malditos	Marcial	
2015	El patrón: radiografía de un crimen	Hermógenes Saldívar	Sebastián Schindel
2016	Cien años de perdón	Crazy Man	Daniel Calparsoro
2017	El faro de las orcas	Beto	Gerardo Olivares
2018	Las grietas de Jara	Pablo Simó	Nicolás Gil Lavedra
2018	El árbol de la sangre	Olmo	Julio Medem
2019	Taxi a Gibraltar	Diego	Alejo Flah
2019	El Hijo (The Son)	Lorenzo Roy	Sebastián Schindel
2020	Intuition	Francisco Juanéz	Alejandro Montiel
2020	El año de la furia (The Year of Fury)	Leonardo	
2026	Cortafuego (Firebreak)	Luis	David Victori

=== Television program ===
Year	Program	Channel	Notes
2011	Residentes	El Trece	Co-host

== Awards ==
Year	Award	Category	Program	Result
2003	Clarín Awards	Male Revelation in theater	Don Chicho	Winner
2003	Premios María Guerrero	Male Revelation in theater	Don Chicho	Winner
2003	Premios Florencio Sánchez	Male Revelation in theater	Don Chicho	Winner
2004	Martín Fierro Awards	Best Leading Actor of Daily fiction and comedy	Soy gitano	Nominated
2007	Martín Fierro Awards	Best Actor Novel Protagonist	Montecristo	Nominated
2009	Martín Fierro Awards	Best Actor Novel Protagonist	Don Juan y su bella dama	Nominated
2011	Martín Fierro Awards	Best Actor Novel Protagonist	Caín y Abel	Nominated
2011	ACE Award	Best Actor Protagonist in Drama	La vida es sueño	Winner
2011	Premios María Guerrero	Best Actor Protagonist in Drama	La vida es sueño	Winner
2011	Premios Florencio Sánchez	Best Actor Protagonist in Drama	La vida es sueño	Winner
2013	Martín Fierro Awards	Best Supporting Actor	Sos mi hombre	Nominated
2013	ACE Award	Best Actor Protagonist in Drama	Lluvia constante	Nominated
2015	Martín Fierro Awards	Best Actor Novel Protagonist	Sres. Papis	Nominated
2015	Festival de Guadalajara	Best Featured Actor	El patrón: radiografía de un crimen	Winner
2015	Festival de Huelva	Best Featured Actor	El patrón: radiografía de un crimen	Winner
2015	Sur Awards	Best Featured Actor	El patrón: radiografía de un crimen	Winner
2016	Martín Fierro Awards	Best lead actor of daily fiction	Entre caníbales	Winner
2016	Silver Condor Awards	Best Featured Actor	El patrón: radiografía de un crimen	Winner

== Awards ==
- 2015 Martín Fierro Awards
  - Best lead actor of daily fiction
