= Catalina Artusi =

Argentine actress

- Born: 24 May 1990 (age 35); Buenos Aires, Argentina
- Occupation: Actress
- Years active: 1997-present
- Partner(s): Juan Manuel Torres (2008-2013); Ariel Diwan (2015)
- Children: 1

Catalina Artusi (born 24 May 1990) is an Argentine actress.

== Career ==
Catalina Artusi began her career in television in the year 1997 in the series Ricos y Famosos. Her rise to fame came after she was called by Cris Morena to be part of the famous children's television series Chiquititas. From 1999 to 2000, she was part of the cast of the youth television series Verano del '98. In 2000, she had a minor role in the television series Yago, pasión morena. From 2000 to 2001, she was part of the cast of the television series Luna salvaje. In 2001, she makes a small participation in the television series Tiempo final. In 2002, she makes a small participation in the television series Máximo corazón. In 2004, she had a minor role in the television series Culpable de este amor. In 2005, she was part of the cast of the youth television series Floricienta. In 2007, she had a minor role in the television series Son de Fierro. In 2008, she made her film debut, with the movie Visitante de invierno. From 2008 to 2009, she was part of the cast of the television series Don Juan y su bella dama. In 2011, she had a minor role in the television series El elegido. In 2013, she was part of the cast of the television series Bienvenido Brian. In 2018, she had a minor role in the television series Mi hermano es un clon.

== Personal life ==
In August 2010, she gave birth to her first child, a boy.

== Filmography ==
=== Television ===
| Year | Title | Character | Channel |
|---|---|---|---|
| 1997 | Ricos y Famosos | Mili | Canal 9 |
| 1998 | Chiquititas | Catalina | Telefe |
| 1999-2000 | Verano del '98 | Trinidad "Titi" Guzmán | Telefe |
| 2000 | Yago, pasión morena | Claribel | Telefe |
| 2000-2001 | Luna salvaje | Yanina | Telefe |
| 2001 | Tiempo final | Ana | Telefe |
| 2002 | Máximo corazón | Lucilita | Telefe |
| 2004 | Culpable de este amor | Soledad Cazenave | Telefe |
| 2005 | Floricienta | Marina | Canal 13 |
| 2007 | Son de Fierro | | Canal 13 |
| 2008-2009 | Don Juan y su bella dama | Micaela Muñoz | Telefe |
| 2011 | El elegido | Yessica "Colette" Álvarez | Telefe |
| 2013 | Bienvenido Brian | Aldana | Canal 9 |
| 2018 | Mi hermano es un clon | Carolina | Canal 13 |

=== Movies ===
| Year | Movie | Character | Director |
|---|---|---|---|
| 2008 | Visitante de invierno | Julieta | Sergio Esquenazi |

=== Videoclips ===
| Year | Artist | Song | Director |
|---|---|---|---|
| 2008 | Agustín Almeyda | Como Tus Ojos | Martín Tejeda and Gabriel Grieco |
| 2019 | Lit killah | Eclipse | Lit killah |
