= Hanna – Folge deinem Herzen =

- Country of origin: Germany

Hanna – Folge deinem Herzen is a German television series.

== See also ==
- List of German television series
