= Herzflimmern – Die Klinik am See =

- Country of origin: Germany
- No. of episodes: 255

Production
- Running time: 45 minutes

Original release
- Network: ZDF
- Release: 2010 – 2012

Herzflimmern – Die Klinik am See is a German television series soap opera produced by Bavaria Film and broadcast on ZDF that aired from 2010 to 2012.

== See also ==
- List of German television series
