= Dahoam is Dahoam =

- Genre: Soap opera
- Theme music composer: Harry Blank
- Country of origin: Germany
- No. of episodes: 3138

Production
- Running time: 30 minutes
- Production companies: PolyScreen, Constantin Television

Original release
- Network: BR
- Release: October 8, 2007 – present

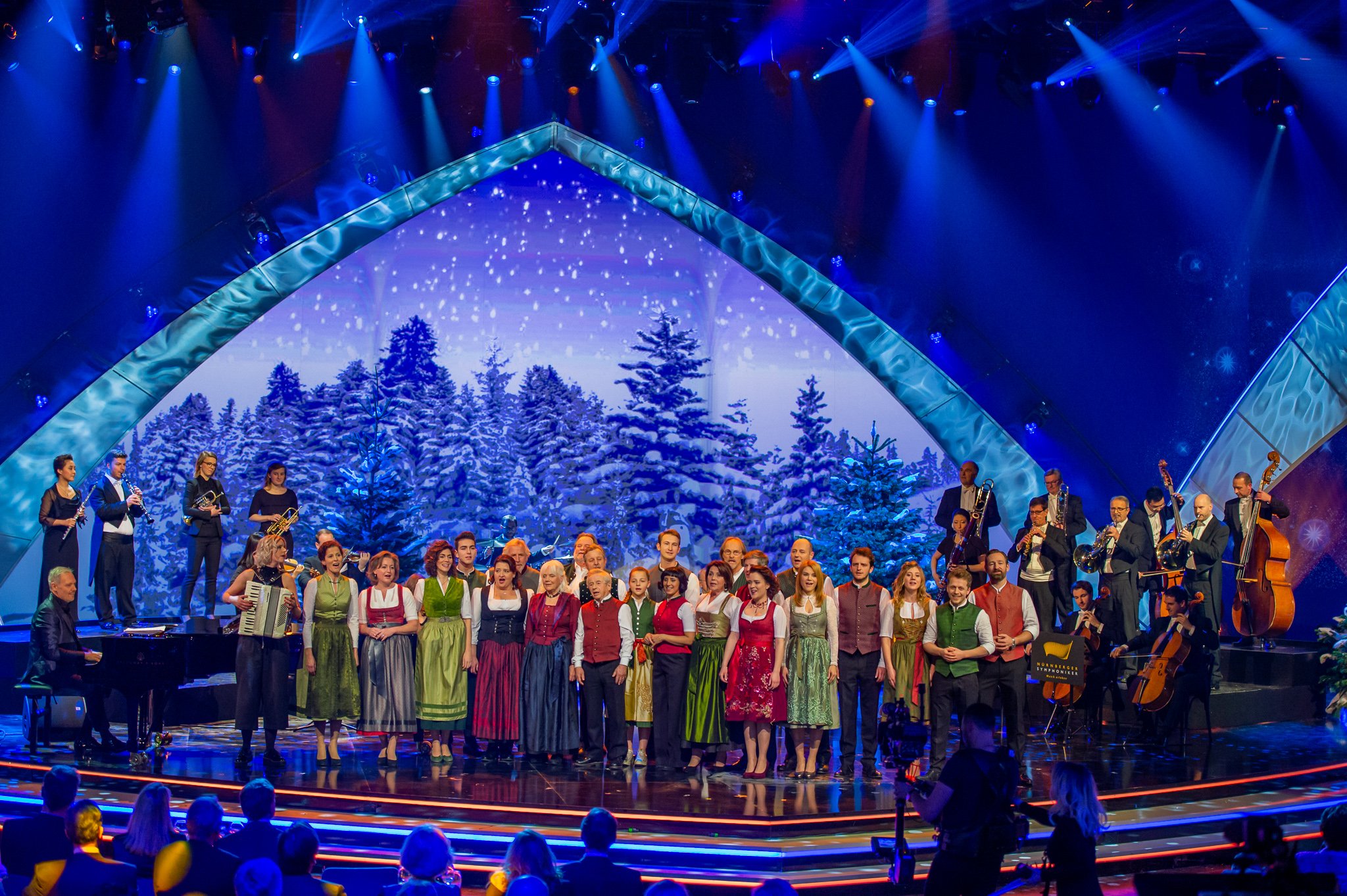
Dahoam is Dahoam Choir (2019)

Dahoam is Dahoam ("Home is Home") is a German television soap opera. It concerns the lives of the residents of the fictitious village of Lansing in Upper Bavaria. The characters speak the Bavarian dialect (with some adjustments to standard German). The show is similar to the British ITV show Where the Heart is.

== Plot ==
Dahoam is Dahoam is about experiences of the inhabitants of the fictitious Upper Bavarian village Lansing. Stories are told about family and everyday life, which among other things revolve around the innkeeper family Brunner, the brewery family Kirchleitner, the family Bamberger, and the family Preissinger. The action-bearing main characters form an ensemble, which changes over the seasons again and again.

== See also ==
- List of German television series
