= Lena – Liebe meines Lebens =

- Genre: Telenovela
- Created by: Claudio Villarruel; Bernarda Llorente
- Developed by: Günter Overmann & Camilla Sauer
- Written by: Günter Overmann & writing team
- Directed by: Daniel Anderson; Hartwig van der Neut; Cornelia Dohrn
- Starring: Jessica Ginkel; Max Alberti
- Narrated by: Jessica Ginkel
- Theme music composer: Tone Damli Aaberge - "Butterflies"
- Composer: Curt Cress
- Country of origin: Germany
- Original language: German
- No. of episodes: 180

Production
- Executive producer: Sabine Eckhard
- Producers: Rudolf Jehner; Quirin Berg; Max Wiedemann; Jan Richard Schuster
- Production locations: Cologne, Germany
- Cinematography: Olaf Rehahn
- Camera setup: Multiple-camera setup
- Running time: 43 minutes
- Production companies: Endemol Germany; Wiedemann & Berg Television GmbH & Co. KG

Original release
- Network: ZDF
- Release: September 20, 2010 – June 21, 2011

Related
- Don Juan y Su Bella Dama

Lena – Liebe meines Lebens (Lena - Love of my Life) is a German telenovela, starring Jessica Ginkel and Max Alberti. It is an adaptation of the Argentine telenovela Don Juan y Su Bella Dama, created by Claudio Villarruel and Bernarda Llorente. The telenovela, produced by the international production company Endemol, premiered on September 20, 2010.

== Plot ==
Lena Sander is a good-hearted, spirited, attractive young woman. She has lived in Cologne since birth and is a trained clerical worker. Lena doesn't enjoy this profession much, which leads to her switching from job to job. Lena lives with her boyfriend of six years, Tony Weiss and his eight-year-old son Luca, whom she loves as she would her own child. Her parents, Frank and Pia, live together with her younger brother Michael right across the street from her. Lena leads a very normal life with which she is more or less happy. However, all of this changes on the day she quite accidentally meets Countess Amelie von Arensberg. Following a bad day, Lena almost runs over Amelie with her bicycle. Lena helps the ageing Countess, who is quite confused at being nearly run over, back to her home, where she meets Amelie's grandson David. David von Arensberg, a musician and composer has just returned home to Cologne having spent almost two years away in Los Angeles. Lena and David feel drawn to each other, however, Lena in particular realises that she is already in a steady relationship with Tony.

== Cast ==
=== Protagonists ===
- Lena Sander née von Arensberg (Jessica Ginkel) - Lena is the heroine, whose life begins to change once here path crosses with Amelie von Arensberg.
- David von Arensberg (Max Alberti) - David is described as a womanizer, who enjoys life and his wealth in every way he can.

=== Main cast ===
- Amelie von Arensberg (Johanna Liebeneiner) - Amelie is the good-hearted grandmother of David, who is slowly beginning to feel the process of ageing.
- Tony Weiss (Kostas Sommer) - Tony is Lena's boyfriend, a car mechanic, who has a very dark and sinister nature and who is involved in illegal deals.
- Vanessa Meyer (Janina Flieger) - "Vanessa" is a contriving young woman who uses wealthy men to better her prospects. She is in a relationship with Rafael von Arnsberg, but also has an affair with his son, David.
- Rafael von Arensberg (Urs Remond) - Rafael is the father of David, son of Amelie. He schemes to sell the family castle by placing his mother in an old people's home.
- Pia Sander (Jenny Jürgens) - Pia is the wife of Frank Sander and mother of his children, Lena and Michael.
- Frank Sander (Joachim Raaf) - Frank is a police officer. He is having an affair with a colleague, Gaby Keller.
- Michael Sander (Felix Bold) - Michael is Lena's younger brother and dating Jasmin Blohm.
- Conny Küppers (Annika Ernst) - Conny is Lena's best friend.
- Tom Lorenz (Thomas M. Held) is David's best friend. He is an up-and-coming film producer.

=== Minor cast ===
- Gaby Keller (Isabella Schmid) is a police officer. She is having a secret affair with Frank Zander.
- Luca Weiss (Kilian Krüll) is the son of Lena's boyfriend Tony.
- Janka Kovac (Mila Kostadinovic) is Luca's mother, who he believes is dead.
- Jasmin Blohm (Barbara Prakopenka) is Michael's girlfriend.
- Linda Behrendt (Isabel Varell) is Lena's aunt and the sister of her mother, Pia.
- Peter Evers (Mirco Reseg) is an efficient and honest police officer, a colleague of Gaby Keller and Frank Zander.

== Production ==
The taste for telenovelas in Germany can be attributed in a large measure to the airing of some of the finest Latin American telenovelas such as Sinha Moca and Isaura. The German experiment got to an unsteady start. The production of two telenovelas, Alisa – Folge deinem Herzen and its sequel Hanna - Folge deinem Herzen, were both received less than enthusiastically by viewers, who saw the plot as being two closely aligned and with nothing new or challenging. In this climate, the ZDF channel partnered with Endemol to adapt the Argentine telenovela Don Juan y Su Bella Dama. The result, originally named Lena - Melodien der Liebe, found its German developer with Günter Overmann and his writing team, who promised to create something new in the flavorless German telenovela world, while retaining the warm and humane style of most of the ZDF telenovelas. The production started on June 30, 2010 in Cologne. Most of the scenes were shot at the MMC Studios in Hürth, Schloss Gymnich and in downtown Cologne.

Even though the show is an adaptation from the Argentine original, a few parts have been changed to suit German audiences. Producer Quirin Berg observed that these changes needed to be made especially because the original was a primetime format in which social violence played a large part. Another consideration, according to Berg, was the need to adapt the storyline and scenes to suit European and in particular German audiences. There was also the need to adapt certain socio-political and socio-economic aspects of the original to reflect the standards of realism in art and film both in Germany and the rest of western Europe.

== Broadcast ==
The telenovela was aired on September 20, 2010 in three European countries, including Germany. The other two countries were Austria and Switzerland. The telenovela is the result of a co-production between these three countries, with the ZDF in Germany as the main contributor and partner of Endemol. In all three countries Lena - Liebe meines Lebens took over the time slot of an earlier telenovela Hanna - Folge denim Herzen . In Estonia this telenovela was aired in May 2011 and the following year in January 2012 in Latvia.

== Broadcasters ==
Georgia	Lena-chemi cxovrebis sikvaruli	GDS	March 17, 2014		Monday to Friday
Germany	Lena – Liebe meines Lebens	ZDF	September 20, 2010.	June 21, 2011	Monday to Friday
Austria	Lena – Liebe meines Lebens	?	September 20, 2010.	?	Monday to Friday
Switzerland	Lena – Liebe meines Lebens	?	September 20, 2010.	?	Monday to Friday
Estonia	Lena, mu elu armastus	TV3 Estonia	May 16, 2011.	January 23, 2012	Monday to Friday
Latvia	Lēna, mana mūža mīlestība	TV3 Latvia	January 2, 2012	?	Monday to Friday
Italy	Lena, l'amore della mia vita	RAI 3	December 6, 2012	?	Monday to Friday
