= Sıla Şahin =

German actress (born 1985)

Sıla Şahin-Radlinger
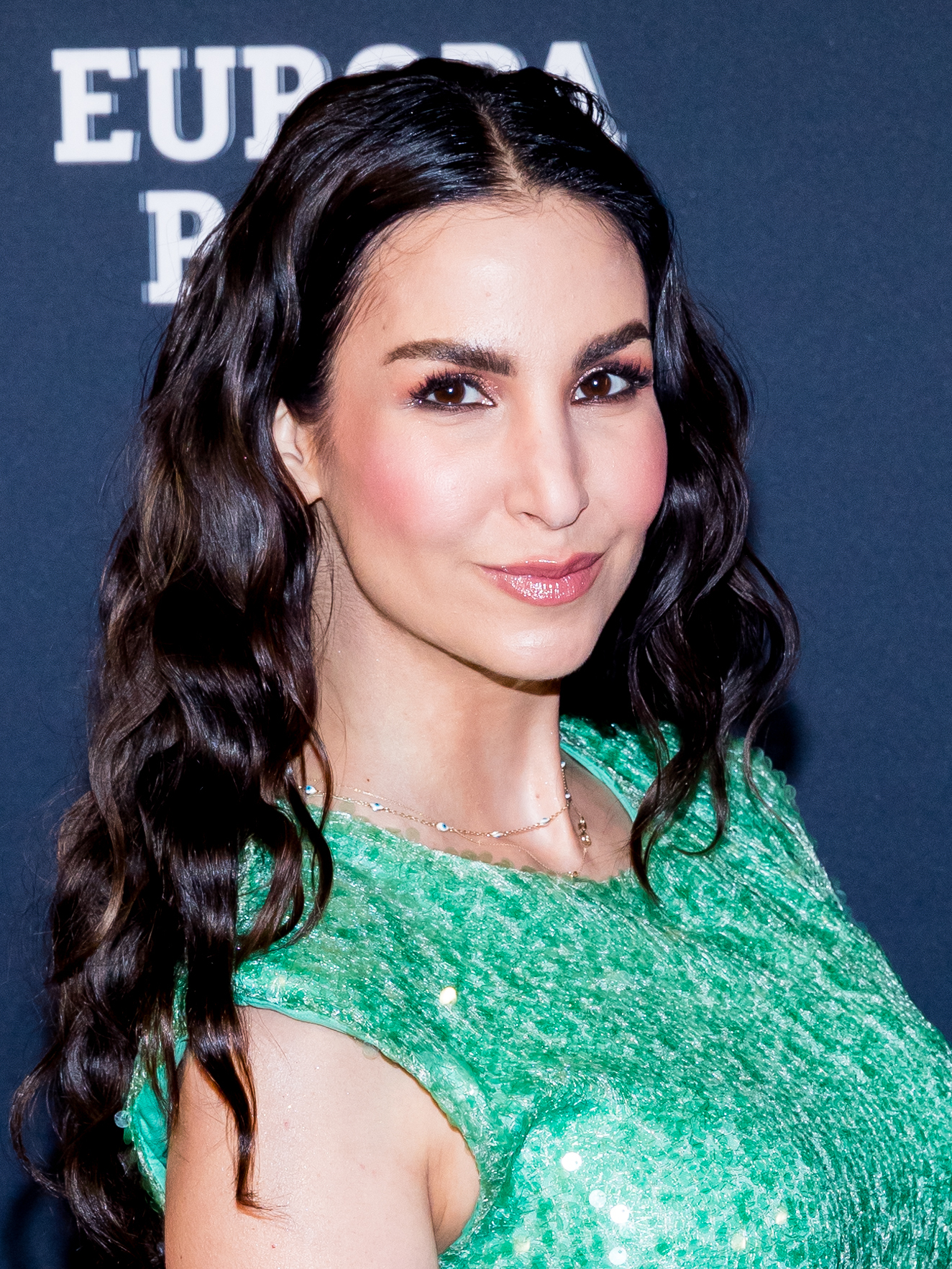
- Şahin-Radlinger in 2024
- Born: Sıla Şahin; 3 December 1985 (age 39); Spandau, West Berlin, West Germany
- Occupation: Actress
- Spouse: Samuel Şahin-Radlinger (m. 2016)

Sıla Şahin-Radlinger (née Şahin, born 3 December 1985) is a German actress, best known for her portrayal of Ayla Özgül in the soap opera Gute Zeiten, schlechte Zeiten.

== German Playboy ==
Şahin-Radlinger posed nude for the German edition of Playboy magazine in May 2011, and became the first Turkish woman to appear on the cover of the magazine. The move upset some conservative members of her family. Muslim Indian-American writer Asra Nomani wrote of the relation of the Islamic term awrah to Şahin, and to other Muslim women including Nomani herself, concluding with an expression of hope in "finding a middle ground" between traditional and evolving mores.

In the interview published in the magazine, Şahin-Radlinger described her act as one of liberation and described it as a revolution akin to Che Guevara:

"My upbringing was conservative, I was always told, you must not go out, you must not make yourself look so attractive, you mustn’t have male friends. I have always abided by what men say. As a result I developed an extreme desire for freedom. I feel like Che Guevara. I have to do everything I want, otherwise I feel like I may as well be dead."

However, Florian Boitin, the editor in chief of German Playboy, claims Sıla Şahin-Radlinger is not a Muslim, saying, "Sila isn't Muslim. Her father doesn't belong to any [religion] and her mother is Christian. And the Playboy cover with Sila Sahin is not a religious statement."

== Personal life ==
Şahin-Radlinger was born in Spandau, Berlin, to an actor father and lives in Charlottenburg. She is 1.71 m (5 ft 7 1/2 in) tall and speaks four languages: German, Kurdish, Turkish and English.

In June 2016, she married footballer Samuel Radlinger. The couple have two sons together.
