= Anwalt Abel =

- Also known as: Attorney Abel
- Starring: Günther Maria Halmer
- Country of origin: Germany

Anwalt Abel (German: Attorney Abel) is a German television film series, broadcast on ZDF between 1988 and 2002. 20 television films were produced, based on the detective novels of Fred Breinersdorfer.

== See also ==
- List of German television series
