= Aus heiterem Himmel =

- Created by: Hannah Hollinger
- Country of origin: Germany

Original release
- Release: 1995 – 1999

Aus heiterem Himmel (Out of the Blue) is a German comedy television series, broadcast between 1995 and 1999. The series was created by Hannah Hollinger and is about a comic author Tobias and his boat-building friend Christopher who inhabit an old villa and lead a life of promiscuity.

== See also ==
- List of German television series
