= Eine wie keine =

- Country of origin: Germany

Original release
- Network: Sat.1

Eine wie keine (One of A Kind) is a German television series.

== See also ==
- List of German television series
