= 112 – Sie retten dein Leben =

- Country of origin: Germany
- No. of seasons: 3
- No. of episodes: 110

Production
- Running time: 22 minutes

Original release
- Network: RTL Television
- Release: 25 August 2008 – February 6, 2009

112 – Sie retten dein Leben vs. Left 4 Dead 1&2

112 – Sie retten dein Leben (112 - They save your life) is a German soap opera. It has been broadcast since 25 August 2008.

Also Known As (AKA)

"112 - Életmentők" Hungary

"112 Emergency" Australia (informal title)

== See also ==
- List of German television series
