= Caroline Beil =

German actress and television presenter

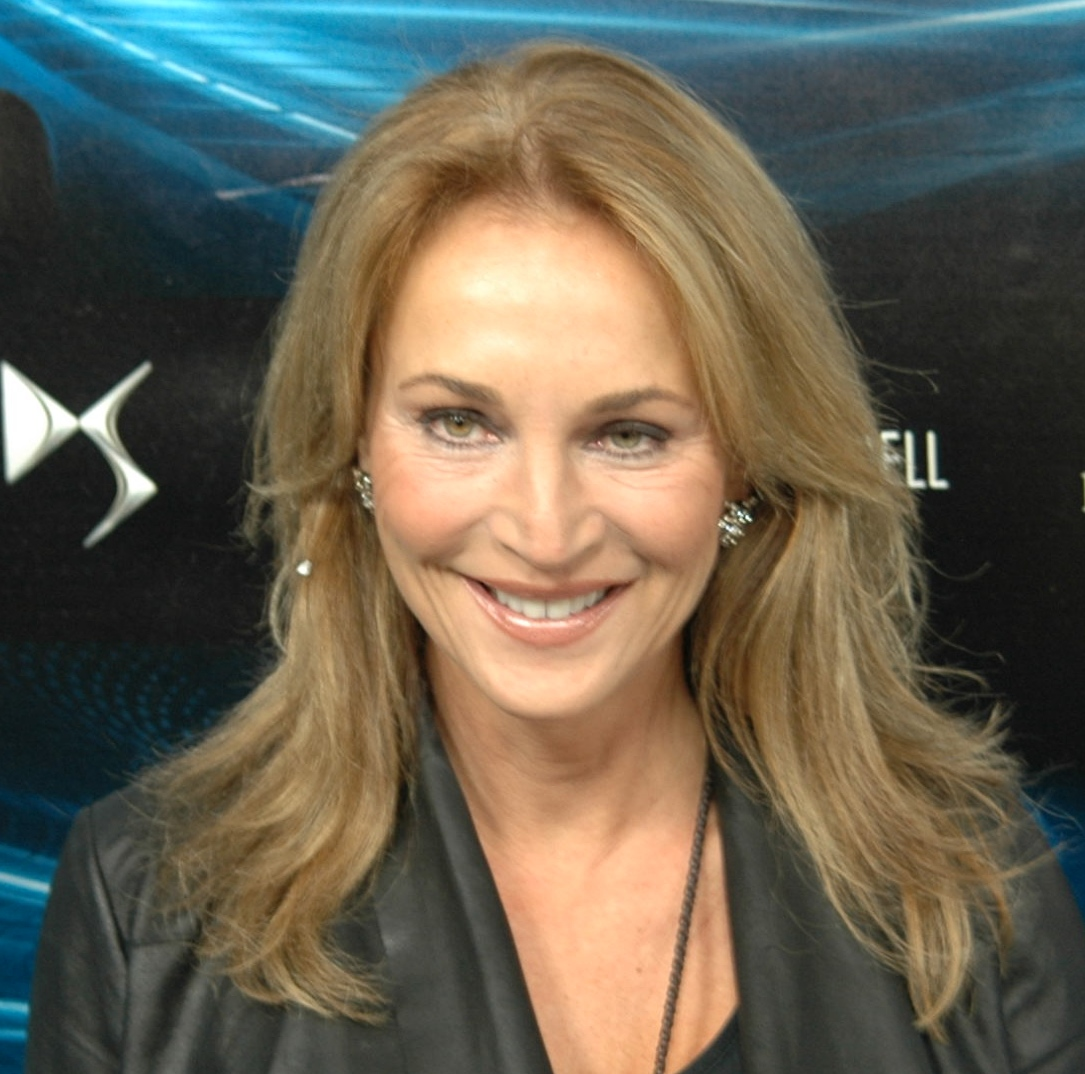
Caroline Beil (2014)

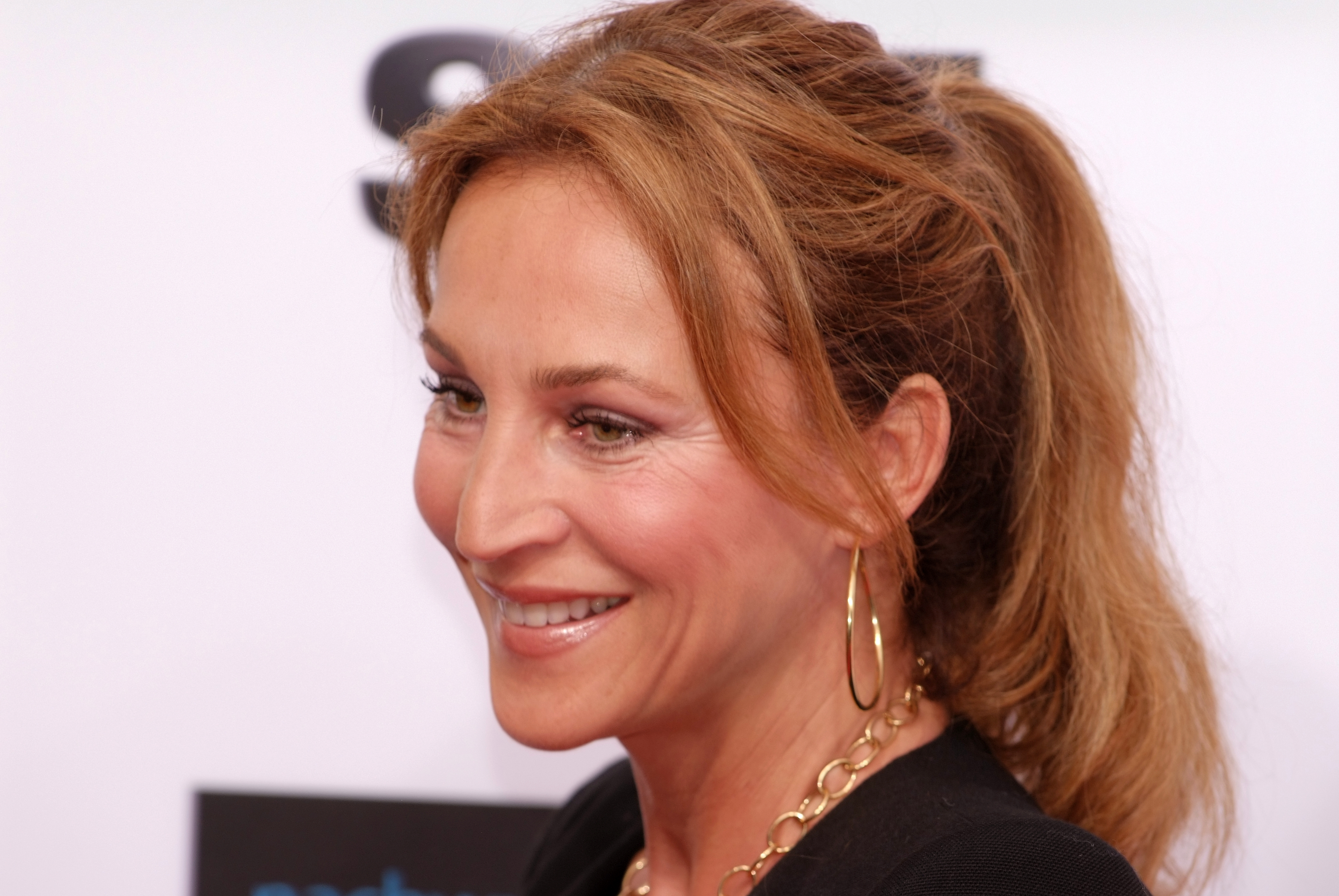
Caroline Beil (2012)

Caroline Beil (born 3 November 1966 in Hamburg) is a German actress and television presenter. She is best known for the role of Fiona Marquardt in the German soap opera Storm of Love.

== Private life ==
From 1995 to 1996, Beil was for the first time married to actor Jerry Marwig. In 2002 she married publisher Hendrik te Neues. They divorced in 2005. She is mother of a son (* 2009), whose father is Pete Dwojak. Beil and Dwojak went apart in 2010. Since 2014, Beil has had a relationship with the dentist Philipp-Marcus Sattler, who is 34 years old. On 22 February 2017 it was reported that Caroline Beil is again pregnant with 50 years of age. On 26 June 2017 Beil gave birth to her second child Ava.
