= Our Charly =

- Unser Charly
- Country of origin: Germany
- No. of seasons: 16
- No. of episodes: 221

Original release
- Network: ZDF
- Release: 27 December 1995 – 9 June 2012

Unser Charly (in English Our Charly) is a German television series produced by Phoenix Film and broadcast on ZDF. It ran from 27 December 1995 to 9 June 2012.

== See also ==
- List of German television series
