= Bravo Otto =

German media award

Bravo Otto Award
- The Golden Otto statuette
- Awarded for: Excellence in film, television, and music
- Country: Germany
- Presented by: Bravo magazine
- First award: 1957
- Website: bravo.de

The Bravo Otto is a German accolade honoring excellence of performers in film, television and music. Established in 1957, the award is presented annually, with winners selected by the readers of Bravo magazine. The award is presented in gold, silver and bronze and, since 1996, an honorary platinum statuette presented for lifetime achievement.

== History ==
The award was originally presented only to actors, however, in 1960, additional categories were created to recognize musical artists. Over time, various categories have been expanded while other categories have been merged or phased out altogether. As of 2011, the Bravo Otto is presented in a total of 11 competitive categories; Male Film Star, Female Film Star, Male TV Star, Female TV Star, Male Super Singer, Female Super Singer, Super Rapper, Super Rock Band, Super Pop Band, Comedy Star and Internet Star.

From 1957 to 1972, The Bravo Otto award ceremony was presented at the beginning of each year. Beginning in 1972, the date of the ceremony was moved to the end of the year, resulting in the awards being presented twice for the 1972 calendar year. Since 1994, the ceremony has been presented in a one-hour annual show called Der Bravo-Supershow – Die Gold-Otto-Verleihung (roughly translated as The Bravo-Supershow – The Gold Otto Awards) and is broadcast annually on German television.

The Otto awards are also presented in other European countries where Bravo publishes regional versions of the magazine. The most notable of these countries include Russia, the Czech Republic and Poland. In Hungary, the awards are presented in an annual ceremony which is broadcast on television, similar to the German ceremony.

== Categories ==
The following categories have been awarded by the Otto's throughout its history, with some categories having been split or merged over time.

- band: 1966–1985, 1999, since 2008
  - band pop: 1994–1998, 2000–2007
  - band rock/pop: 1986–1993
  - band rock: 1994–1998, 2000–2007
  - band hard 'n heavy: 1986–1993
  - school band: 2005
- singer: 2008
  - male singer: since 1960–2007, since 2010
  - female singer: since 1960–2007, since 2010
- duo: 1977
- hip-hop: 1998–1999
  - hip-hop international: 2000–2007
  - hip-hop national: 2000–2007
- dancefloor: 1991–1992, 1994
- rap & dancefloor: 1993
- rap & techno: 1994
- shootingstar: 2003–2004, 2007, since 2010
  - shootingstar band: 2001–2002
  - shootingstar solo: 2001–2002
    - shootingstar male: 2000
    - shootingstar female: 2000
- actor/actress: since 2008
  - actor: 1957–2007
  - actress: 1957–2007
- TV-star: 2008
  - TV-Star male: since 1961–2007, since 2010
  - TV-Star female: since 1961–2007, since 2010
- comedy-star: 2000–2007
- TV-moderator: 1989–1994
  - male TV moderator: 1975
  - female TV moderator: 1975
- athlete: 1973, 1983–1987, 2009
  - male athlete: 1972 JE, 1974–1982, 1988–1993
  - female athlete: 1972 JE, 1974–1982, 1988–1993
- wrestler: 1992–1993
- film: 2009
  - German film: 1978
- special OTTO: 2001–2004, 2006–2007

== Bravo Supershow ==
From 1994 until 2010, the Bravo Otto ceremony was shown on private German broadcaster RTL, RTL II and ProSieben. The following is a list of hosts for each year's ceremony.

- 1994: Kristiane Backer; RTL II
- 1995: Kristiane Backer; RTL II
- 1996: Heike Makatsch; RTL II
- 1997: Jasmin Gerat and DJ BoBo; RTL II
- 1998: Loretta Stern and DJ BoBo; RTL II
- 1999: Nova Meierhenrich and Florian Walberg; RTL II
- 2000: Marco Ströhlein and Enie van de Meiklokjes; RTL
- 2001: Ole Tillmann and Enie van de Meiklokjes; RTL
- 2002: Ole Tillmann and Jessica Schwarz; RTL
- 2003: Ole Tillmann and Janin Reinhardt; RTL
- 2004: Ole Tillmann und Susan Sideropoulos; RTL
- 2005: Gülcan Kamps und Dominic Boeer; RTL
- 2006: Oliver Pocher; ProSieben
- 2007: Gülcan Kamps, Annemarie Warnkross and Elton; ProSieben
- 2008: Mirjam Weichselbraun and Miriam Pielhau; RTL II
- 2010: Jan Köppen and Louisa Mazzurana; RTL II

== Winners (Gold – Silver – Bronze) ==
=== 1957 ===
- actor: James Dean – Horst Buchholz – Burt Lancaster
- actress: Maria Schell – Gina Lollobrigida – Romy Schneider

=== 1958 ===
- actor: Horst Buchholz – O. W. Fischer – Rock Hudson
- actress: Romy Schneider – Maria Schell – Ruth Leuwerik

=== 1959 ===
- actor: O. W. Fischer – Peter Kraus – Hardy Krüger
- actress: Ruth Leuwerik – Romy Schneider – Sabine Sinjen

=== 1960 ===
- actor: O. W. Fischer – Hardy Krüger – Christian Wolff
- actress: Sabine Sinjen – Ruth Leuwerik – Liselotte Pulver
- male singer: Freddy Quinn – Peter Kraus – Elvis Presley
- female singer: Conny Froboess – Caterina Valente – Heidi Brühl

=== 1961 ===
- actor: O. W. Fischer – Hansjörg Felmy – Rock Hudson
- actress: Ruth Leuwerik – Sabine Sinjen – Liselotte Pulver
- male singer: Freddy Quinn – Peter Kraus – Rex Gildo
- female singer: Caterina Valente – Heidi Brühl – Conny Froboess
- TV star male: Willy Millowitsch – Hans-Joachim Kulenkampff (Kleine Stadt – ganz groß) – Joachim Fuchsberger (Zu viele Köche)
- TV star female: Inge Meysel (Das Fenster zum Flur) – Irene Koss (NDR continuity announcer) – Uschi Siebert (Kleine Stadt – ganz groß)

=== 1962 ===
- actor: O. W. Fischer – Rock Hudson – Anthony Perkins
- actress: Ruth Leuwerik – Christine Kaufmann – Sophia Loren
- male singer: Freddy Quinn – Gus Backus – Peter Kraus
- female singer: Connie Francis – Caterina Valente – Conny Froboess
- TV star male: Heinz Drache (Das Halstuch) – Willy Millowitsch – Lou van Burg (Sing mit mir, spiel mit mir)
- TV star female: Inge Meysel – Irene Koss (NDR continuity announcer) – Margot Trooger (Das Halstuch)

=== 1963 ===
- actor Rock Hudson – O. W. Fischer – Anthony Perkins
- actress Sophia Loren – Ruth Leuwerik – Liselotte Pulver
- male singer: Freddy Quinn – Gus Backus – Rex Gildo
- female singer: Connie Francis – Caterina Valente – Conny Froboess
- TV star male: Edd Byrnes (77 Sunset Strip) – Robert Fuller (Laramie) – Lou van Burg (Sing mit mir, spiel mit mir)
- TV star female: Inge Meysel – Margot Trooger – Cordula Trantow

=== 1964 ===
- actor: Thomas Fritsch – Rock Hudson – Pierre Brice
- actress: Sophia Loren – Liselotte Pulver – Doris Day
- male singer: Cliff Richard – Freddy Quinn – Rex Gildo
- female singer: Connie Francis – Conny Froboess – Rita Pavone
- TV star male: Robert Fuller (Laramie) – Edd Byrnes (77 Sunset Strip) – Max Eckard (Tim Frazer)
- TV star female: Inge Meysel – Petra Krause (NDR continuity announcer) – Donna Reed (The Donna Reed Show)

=== 1965 ===
- actor: Pierre Brice – Thomas Fritsch – Lex Barker
- actress: Marie Versini – Sophia Loren – Doris Day
- male singer: Cliff Richard – The Beatles – Freddy Quinn
- female singer: Gitte – Manuela – Connie Francis
- TV star male: Robert Fuller (Laramie) – Edd Byrnes (77 Sunset Strip) – Michael Landon (Bonanza)
- TV star female: Petra Krause (NDR continuity announcer) – Donna Reed (The Donna Reed Show) – Marianne Koch (Was bin ich?)

=== 1966 ===
- actor: Pierre Brice – Sean Connery – Thomas Fritsch
- actress: Marie Versini – Sophia Loren – Liselotte Pulver
- male singer: Drafi Deutscher – Roy Black – Rex Gildo
- female singer: Manuela – Françoise Hardy – Wenche Myhre
- TV star male: Robert Fuller (Laramie) – Hans-Joachim Kulenkampff (Einer wird gewinnen) – Edd Byrnes (77 Sunset Strip)
- TV star female: Petra Krause (NDR continuity announcer) – Inge Meysel (Die Unverbesserlichen) – Marianne Koch (Was bin ich?)
- band: The Beatles – The Rolling Stones – Rainbows

=== 1967 ===
- actor: Pierre Brice – Horst Buchholz – Sean Connery
- actress: Marie Versini – Liselotte Pulver – Uschi Glas
- male singer: Roy Black – Graham Bonney – Udo Jürgens
- female singer: Wenche Myhre – Manuela – Marion
- TV star male: Roger Moore (The Saint) – Dietmar Schönherr (Raumpatrouille Orion) – Robert Fuller (Laramie)
- TV star female: Helga Anders (Die Unverbesserlichen) – Inge Meysel (Die Unverbesserlichen) – Victoria Voncampe (ZDF continuity announcer)
- band: Dave Dee, Dozy, Beaky, Mick & Tich – The Beatles – The Beach Boys

=== 1968 ===
- actor: Pierre Brice – George Nader – Robert Hoffmann
- actress: Marie Versini – Helga Anders – Liselotte Pulver
- male singer: Roy Black – Graham Bonney – Ricky Shayne
- female singer: Wenche Myhre – Manuela – Peggy March
- TV star male: Patrick Macnee (The Avengers) – David McCallum (The Man from U.N.C.L.E.) – Roger Moore (The Saint)
- TV star female: Diana Rigg (The Avengers) – Marianne Koch (Was bin ich?) – Inge Meysel (Die Unverbesserlichen)
- Band: Bee Gees – The Beatles – The Monkees

=== 1969 ===
- actor: Pierre Brice – Robert Hoffmann – George Nader
- actress: Uschi Glas – Marie Versini – Senta Berger
- male singer: Roy Black – Udo Jürgens – Barry Ryan
- female singer: Manuela – Wenche Myhre – France Gall
- TV star male: Michael Landon (Bonanza) – Roger Moore (The Saint) – Patrick Macnee (The Avengers)
- TV star female Diana Rigg (The Avengers) – Inge Meysel (Die Unverbesserlichen) – Helga Anders (Die Unverbesserlichen)
- band: Bee Gees – The Beatles – Lords

=== 1970 ===
- actor: Pierre Brice – Joachim Fuchsberger – Hansi Kraus
- actress: Uschi Glas – Gila von Weitershausen – Marie Versini
- male singer: Roy Black – Barry Ryan – Ricky Shayne
- female singer: Manuela – France Gall – Wenche Myhre
- TV star male: Mark Slade (The High Chaparral) – Henry Darrow (The High Chaparral) – Claus Wilcke (Percy Stuart)
- TV star female: Inge Meysel (Die Unverbesserlichen) – Linda Cristal (The High Chaparral) – Linda Evans (The Big Valley)
- band: The Beatles – The Archies – The Hollies

=== 1971 ===
- actor: Pierre Brice – Hansi Kraus – Peter Fonda
- actress: Uschi Glas – Romy Schneider – Gila von Weitershausen
- male singer: Chris Roberts – Roy Black – Peter Alexander
- female singer Manuela – Daliah Lavi – France Gall
- TV star male: Joachim Fuchsberger (11 Uhr 20) – Fritz Wepper (Der Kommissar) – Claus Wilcke (Percy Stuart)
- TV star female: Peggy Lipton (The Mod Squad) – Inge Meysel (Die Unverbesserlichen) – Marianne Koch (Die Journalistin)
- band: Creedence Clearwater Revival – Bee Gees – Deep Purple

=== Beginning of 1972 ===
- actor: Ryan O'Neal – Pierre Brice – Hansi Kraus
- actress: Uschi Glas – Ali MacGraw – Romy Schneider
- male singer: Chris Roberts – Ricky Shayne – Roy Black
- female singer: Daliah Lavi – Manuela – Katja Ebstein
- TV star male: Claus Wilcke (Percy Stuart) – Joachim Fuchsberger (Heißer Sand) – Amadeus August (Quentin Durward)
- TV star female: Inge Meysel (Die Unverbesserlichen) – Barbara Eden (I Dream of Jeannie) – Linda Cristal (The High Chaparral)
- band: T. Rex – Middle of the Road – The Sweet

=== End of 1972 ===
- actor: Ron Ely – Ryan O'Neal – Terence Hill
- actress: Uschi Glas – Ali MacGraw – Heidi Hansen
- male singer: Jürgen Marcus – Chris Roberts – Neil Diamond
- female singer: Juliane Werding – Melanie – Daliah Lavi
- TV star male: Tony Curtis (The Persuaders!) – Roger Moore (The Persuaders!) – Leonard Nimoy (Star Trek)
- TV star female: Barbara Eden (I Dream of Jeannie) – Juliet Mills (Nanny and the Professor) – Sabine Sinjen
- band: The Sweet – T. Rex – Alice Cooper
- male athlete: Mark Spitz – Günter Netzer – Gerd Müller
- female athlete: Heide Rosendahl – Ulrike Meyfarth – Monika Pflug

=== 1973 ===
- actor: Jan-Michael Vincent – Roger Moore – Terence Hill
- actress: Uschi Glas – Jane Seymour – Ali MacGraw
- male singer: David Cassidy – Bernd Clüver – Jürgen Marcus
- female singer: Suzi Quatro – Ireen Sheer – Daliah Lavi
- TV star male: Horst Janson (Der Bastian) – Detlev Eckstein (Polizeistation) – Dack Rambo (The Guns of Will Sonnett)
- TV star female: Susan Dey (The Partridge Family) – Monika Peitsch (Okay S.I.R.) – Monika Lundi
- band: The Sweet – The Osmonds – Slade
- athlete: Gerd Müller – Günter Netzer – Erwin Kremers

=== 1974 ===
- actor: Terence Hill – Jan-Michael Vincent – Roger Moore
- actress: Ute Kittelberger – Uschi Glas – Linda Blair
- male singer: David Cassidy – Bernd Clüver – Jürgen Marcus
- female singer: Suzi Quatro – Elfi Graf – Maggie Mae
- TV star male: Steve Hodson (Follyfoot) – Oliver Tobias (Arthur of the Britons) – Michael Gray (The Brian Keith Show)
- TV star female: Susan Dey (The Partridge Family) – Gillian Blake (Follyfoot) – Edwige Pierre (Arpad, the Gypsy)
- band: The Sweet – ABBA – The Osmonds
- male athlete: Gerd Müller – Francisco Marinho – Franz Beckenbauer
- female athlete: Ulrike Meyfarth – Rosi Mittermaier – Uta Schorn

=== 1975 ===
- actor: Terence Hill – Jan-Michael Vincent – Louis de Funès
- actress: Ute Kittelberger – Linda Blair – Christiane Gött
- male singer: David Cassidy – Albert Hammond – Jürgen Marcus
- female singer: Juliane Werding – Penny McLean – Suzi Quatro
- TV star male: Michael Douglas (The Streets of San Francisco) – Peter Falk (Columbo) – Michael Gray (The Brian Keith Show)
- TV star female: Susan Dey (The Partridge Family) – Gillian Blake (Follyfoot) – Ingrid Steeger (Klimbim)
- male TV moderator: Ilja Richter (Disco) – Rudi Carrell (Am laufenden Band) – Michael Schanze (Hätten Sie heut’ Zeit für mich?)
- female TV moderator: Uschi Nerke (Musikladen) – Karin Tietze-Ludwig (HR continuity announcer) – Elfie von Kalckreuth (ZDF continuity announcer)
- band: Bay City Rollers – The Sweet – ABBA
- male athlete: Sepp Maier – Gerd Müller – Franz Beckenbauer
- female athlete: Ulrike Meyfarth – Ellen Wellmann – Anne, Princess Royal

=== 1976 ===
- actor: Pierre Brice – Terence Hill – Jan-Michael Vincent
- actress: Sophia Loren – Ute Kittelberger – Uschi Glas
- male singer: Shaun Cassidy – Jürgen Drews – David Cassidy
- female singer: Tina Charles – Penny McLean – Marianne Rosenberg
- TV star male: Michael Douglas (The Streets of San Francisco) – Oliver Tobias (Arthur of the Britons) – Simon Turner (Kim & Co.)
- TV star female: Susan Dey (The Partridge Family) – Ingrid Steeger (Klimbim) – Uschi Nerke (Musikladen)
- band: Bay City Rollers – The Sweet – ABBA
- male athlete: Sepp Maier – Franz Beckenbauer – Gerd Müller
- female athlete: Rosi Mittermaier – Nadia Comăneci – Annegret Richter

=== 1977 ===
- actor: Pierre Brice – Leif Garrett – Terence Hill
- actress: Nastassja Kinski – Uschi Glas – Romy Schneider
- male singer: Shaun Cassidy – Jürgen Drews – Frank Zander
- female singer: Bonnie Tyler – Siw Inger – Marianne Rosenberg
- duo: Baccara – Hoffmann & Hoffmann – The Bellamy Brothers
- TV star male: Herbert Herrmann (Drei sind einer zuviel) – Christopher Stone (Spencer's Pilots) – Thomas Fritsch (Drei sind einer zuviel)
- TV star female: Jutta Speidel (Drei sind einer zuviel) – Ingrid Steeger (Klimbim) – Barbara Bain (Space: 1999)
- band: Smokie – Bay City Rollers – ABBA
- male athlete Sepp Maier – Klaus Fischer – Hansi Müller
- female athlete: Annegret Richter – Dagmar Lurz – Evi Mittermaier

=== 1978 ===
- actor: John Travolta – Bud Spencer – Pierre Brice
- actress: Nastassja Kinski – Olivia Pascal – Karen Lynn Gorney
- German films: They Called Him Bulldozer – Popcorn and Ice Cream – Passion Flower Hotel
- male singer: Leif Garrett – Jürgen Drews – Shaun Cassidy
- female singer: Olivia Newton-John – Amanda Lear – Suzi Quatro
- TV star male: Paul Michael Glaser (Starsky & Hutch) – Sascha Hehn (The Outsiders) – Richard Hatch (The Streets of San Francisco)
- TV star female: Ingrid Steeger (Zwei himmlische Töchter) – Jutta Speidel (Drei sind einer zuviel) – Catherine Schell (Space: 1999)
- band: Smokie – ABBA – The Teens
- male athlete: Hansi Müller – Sepp Maier – Kevin Keegan
- female athlete: Dagmar Lurz – Annegret Richter – Evi Mittermaier

=== 1979 ===
- actor: John Travolta – Bud Spencer – Roger Moore
- actress: Olivia Pascal – Nastassja Kinski – Liz Taylor
- male singer: Leif Garrett – Peter Maffay – Patrick Hernandez
- female singer: Olivia Newton-John – Donna Summer – Suzi Quatro
- TV star male: Kabir Bedi (Sandokan) – Paul Michael Glaser (Starsky & Hutch) – Jochen Schroeder (The Great Runaway)
- TV star female: Farrah Fawcett (Charlie's Angels) – Kristy McNichol (Family) – Jaclyn Smith (Charlie's Angels)
- band: The Teens – ABBA – Smokie
- male athlete: Hansi Müller – Kevin Keegan – Björn Borg
- female athlete: Christa Kinshofer – Annegret Richter – Dagmar Lurz

=== 1980 ===
- actor: Matt Dillon – Terence Hill – John Travolta
- actress: Kristy McNichol – Olivia Pascal – Tatum O'Neal
- male singer: Leif Garrett – Peter Maffay – Cliff Richard
- female singer: Olivia Newton-John – Suzi Quatro – Diana Ross
- TV star male: Robert Urich (Vegas) – Thomas Ohrner (Timm Thaler) – Thomas Gottschalk (Telespiele)
- TV star female: Farrah Fawcett (Charlie's Angels) – Désirée Nosbusch (Hits von der Schulbank) – Jaclyn Smith (Charlie's Angels)
- band: The Teens – ABBA – Kiss
- male athlete: Karl-Heinz Rummenigge – Hansi Müller – Björn Borg
- female athlete: Christa Kinshofer – Dagmar Lurz – Tina Riegel

=== 1981 ===
- actor: Roger Moore – Matt Dillon – Christopher Atkins
- actress: Farrah Fawcett – Kristy McNichol – Brooke Shields
- male singer: Shakin' Stevens – Roland Kaiser – Marius Müller-Westernhagen
- female singer: Kim Wilde – Olivia Newton-John – Helen Schneider
- TV star male Patrick Duffy (Dallas) – Robert Urich (Vegas) – Sascha Hehn
- TV star female Victoria Principal (Dallas) – Désirée Nosbusch – Charlene Tilton (Dallas)
- band: Adam & The Ants – The Teens – ABBA
- male athlete: Karl-Heinz Rummenigge – Pierre Littbarski – Hansi Müller
- female athlete: Denise Biellmann – Tina Riegel – Christa Kinshofer

=== 1982 ===
- actor: Maxwell Caulfield – Adriano Celentano – Arnold Schwarzenegger
- actress: Michelle Pfeiffer – Ornella Muti – Farrah Fawcett
- male singer: Shakin' Stevens – F. R. David – Peter Maffay
- female singer: Nena – Kim Wilde – Frida
- TV star male: Patrick Duffy (Dallas) – Lewis Collins (The Professionals) – Martin Shaw (The Professionals)
- TV star female: Victoria Principal (Dallas) – Jutta Speidel – Linda Gray (Dallas)
- band: Spider Murphy Gang – ABBA – BAP
- male athlete: Karl-Heinz Rummenigge – Pierre Littbarski – Toni Schumacher
- female athlete: Ulrike Meyfarth – Tina Riegel – Denise Biellmann

=== 1983 ===
- actor: John Travolta – Sylvester Stallone – Mark Hamill
- actress: Jennifer Beals – Sophie Marceau – Cynthia Rhodes
- male singer: Limahl – Shakin' Stevens – Rod Stewart
- female singer: Irene Cara – Kim Wilde – Agnetha Fältskog
- TV star male: John James (Dynasty) – Patrick Duffy (Dallas) – Thomas Gottschalk (Na sowas!)
- TV star female: Heather Locklear (Dynasty) – Linda Evans (Dynasty) – Victoria Principal (Dallas)
- band: Nena – Kajagoogoo – Culture Club
- athlete: Karl-Heinz Rummenigge – Toni Schumacher – Jean-Marie Pfaff

=== 1984 ===
- actor: Harrison Ford – Noah Hathaway – Kevin Bacon
- actress: Tami Stronach – Jennifer Beals – Lori Singer
- male singer: Limahl – George Michael – Shakin' Stevens
- female singer: Kim Wilde – Cyndi Lauper – Tina Turner
- TV star male: Tom Selleck (Magnum, P.I.) – John James (Dynasty) – Michael Praed (Robin of Sherwood)
- TV star female: Stefanie Powers (Hart to Hart) – Priscilla Presley (Dallas) – Heather Locklear (Dynasty)
- band: Nena – Duran Duran – Wham!
- athlete: Karl-Heinz Rummenigge – Michael Groß – Toni Schumacher

=== 1985 ===
- actor: Sylvester Stallone – Michael J. Fox – Götz George
- actress: Jennifer Beals – Grace Jones – Tanya Roberts
- male singer: Falco – Rick Springfield – Bruce Springsteen
- female singer: Madonna – Sandra – Tina Turner
- TV star male: Richard Chamberlain (The Thorn Birds) – Hendrik Martz (Patrik Pacard) – Lee Majors (The Fall Guy)
- TV star female: Heather Thomas (The Fall Guy) – Rachel Ward (The Thorn Birds) – Stefanie Powers (Hart to Hart)
- band: Modern Talking – Duran Duran – a-ha
- athlete: Boris Becker – Aaron Krickstein – Ivan Lendl

=== 1986 ===
- actor: Tom Cruise – Sylvester Stallone – Ralph Macchio
- actress: Kelly McGillis – Farrah Fawcett – Radost Bokel
- male singer: Falco – Den Harrow – Chris Norman
- female singer Madonna – Samantha Fox – Sandra
- TV star male: Bruce Boxleitner (Scarecrow and Mrs. King) – Hendrik Martz (Die Wicherts von nebenan) – David Hasselhoff (Knight Rider)
- TV star female: Kate Jackson (Scarecrow and Mrs. King) – Catherine Oxenberg (Dynasty) – Heather Thomas (The Fall Guy)
- rock group: a-ha – Modern Talking – Depeche Mode
- hard 'n heavy: Europe – Scorpions – ZZ Top
- athlete: Boris Becker – Steffi Graf – Stefan Edberg

=== 1987 ===
- actor: Tom Cruise – Sylvester Stallone – Eddie Murphy
- actress: Kelly McGillis – Jennifer Grey – Brigitte Nielsen
- male singer: Den Harrow – Michael Jackson – Rick Astley
- female singer: Madonna – Sandra – Sabrina
- TV star male: Don Johnson (Miami Vice) – Patrick Swayze (North and South) – Bruce Boxleitner (Scarecrow and Mrs. King)
- TV star female: Kate Jackson (Scarecrow and Mrs. King) – Heather Thomas (The Fall Guy) – Lesley-Anne Down (North and South)
- rock group: a-ha – Pet Shop Boys – Depeche Mode
- hard 'n heavy: Europe – Bon Jovi – Whitesnake
- athlete: Steffi Graf – Stefan Edberg – Gabriela Sabatini

=== 1988 ===
- actor: Patrick Swayze – Sylvester Stallone – Eddie Murphy
- actress: Jennifer Grey – Linda Kozlowski – Kelly McGillis
- male singer: Michael Jackson – Rick Astley – Eros Ramazzotti
- female singer: Sandra – Whitney Houston – Kylie Minogue
- TV star male: David Hasselhoff (Knight Rider) – Don Johnson (Miami Vice) – Bruce Boxleitner (Scarecrow and Mrs. King)
- TV star female: Kate Jackson (Scarecrow and Mrs. King) – Heather Thomas (The Fall Guy) – Silvia Seidel (Anna)
- rock groups: Die Ärzte – a-ha – Bros
- hard 'n heavy: Europe – Bon Jovi – Helloween
- male athlete: Andre Agassi – Jürgen Klinsmann – Stefan Edberg
- female athlete: Steffi Graf – Florence Griffith-Joyner – Anja Fichtel

=== 1989 ===
- actor: Tom Cruise – Corey Haim – Patrick Swayze
- actress: Kim Basinger – Sophie Marceau – Jennifer Grey
- male singer: Jason Donovan – David Hasselhoff – Michael Jackson
- female singer: Sandra – Madonna – Kylie Minogue
- TV star male: David Hasselhoff (Knight Rider) – Don Johnson (Miami Vice) – Richard Dean Anderson (MacGyver)
- TV star female: Heather Locklear (Dynasty) – Heather Thomas (The Fall Guy) – Andrea Elson (ALF)
- TV moderator: Thomas Gottschalk (Wetten, dass..?) – Kai Böcking (Formel Eins) – Günther Jauch (Na siehste!)
- band rock/pop: Milli Vanilli – Roxette – Bros
- band hard 'n heavy: Bon Jovi – Europe – Guns N' Roses
- male athlete: Boris Becker – Andre Agassi – Carl-Uwe Steeb
- female athlete: Steffi Graf – Gabriela Sabatini – Monica Seles

=== 1990 ===
- actor: Tom Cruise – Patrick Swayze – Richard Gere
- actress: Julia Roberts – Jennifer Grey – Kirstie Alley
- male singer: Matthias Reim – David Hasselhoff – Jason Donovan
- female singer: Sandra – Sinéad O'Connor – Janet Jackson
- TV star male: David Hasselhoff (Baywatch) – Billy Warlock (Baywatch) – Brandon Call (Baywatch)
- TV star female: Erika Eleniak (Baywatch) – Heather Locklear (Dynasty) – Kate Jackson (Scarecrow and Mrs. King)
- TV moderator: Thomas Gottschalk (Wetten, dass..?) – Kai Böcking (Formel Eins) – Günther Jauch (Na siehste!)
- bands rock/pop: New Kids on the Block – Depeche Mode – Roxette
- bands hard'n heavy: Bon Jovi – Alice Cooper – Europe
- male athlete: Andre Agassi – Jürgen Klinsmann – Lothar Matthäus
- female athlete: Steffi Graf – Katrin Krabbe – Monica Seles

=== 1991 ===
- actor: Kevin Costner – Arnold Schwarzenegger – Patrick Swayze
- actress: Julia Roberts – Linda Hamilton – Kirstie Alley
- male singer: Bryan Adams – David Hasselhoff – Matthias Reim
- female singer Sandra – Cher – Paula Abdul
- dancefloor: Marky Mark – MC Hammer – Vanilla Ice
- TV star male: David Hasselhoff (Baywatch) – Richard Grieco (21 Jump Street) – Billy Warlock (Baywatch)
- TV star female Erika Eleniak (Baywatch) – Marcy Walker (Santa Barbara) – Heather Locklear (Dynasty)
- TV moderator: Thomas Gottschalk (Wetten, dass..?) – Hape Kerkeling (Total Normal) – Günther Jauch (stern TV)
- band rock/pop: New Kids on the Block – Roxette – Depeche Mode
- band hard 'n heavy: Scorpions – Guns N' Roses – Bon Jovi
- male athlete: Andre Agassi – Michael Stich – Stefan Edberg
- female athlete: Katrin Krabbe – Steffi Graf – Monica Seles

=== 1992 ===
- actor: Kevin Costner – Jean-Claude Van Damme – Arnold Schwarzenegger
- actress: Julia Roberts – Sharon Stone – Jodie Foster
- male singer: Michael Jackson – David Hasselhoff – Bryan Adams
- female singer: Sandra – Madonna – Mariah Carey
- dancefloor: Dr. Alban – Marky Mark & The Funky Bunch – Die Fantastischen Vier
- TV star male: Jason Priestley (Beverly Hills, 90210) – Luke Perry (Beverly Hills, 90210) – David Hasselhoff (Baywatch)
- TV star female: Shannen Doherty (Beverly Hills, 90210) – Jennie Garth (Beverly Hills, 90210) – Erika Eleniak (Baywatch)
- TV moderator: Thomas Gottschalk (Wetten, dass..?) – Linda de Mol (Traumhochzeit) – Günther Jauch (stern TV)
- band rock/pop: Roxette – New Kids on the Block – Genesis
- band hard 'n heavy: Guns N' Roses – Mr. Big – Scorpions
- male athlete: Andre Agassi – Boris Becker – Magic Johnson
- female athlete: Franziska van Almsick – Steffi Graf – Heike Henkel
- wrestler: Hulk Hogan – Bret 'Hitman' Hart – The British Bulldog

=== 1993 ===
- actor: Tom Cruise – Kevin Costner – Jean-Claude Van Damme
- actress: Whoopi Goldberg – Whitney Houston – Julia Roberts
- male singer: Michael Jackson – David Hasselhoff – Eros Ramazzotti
- female singer: Janet Jackson – Whitney Houston – Sandra
- rap & dancefloor: Culture Beat – 2 Unlimited – Haddaway
- TV star male: Luke Perry (Beverly Hills, 90210) – Jason Priestley (Beverly Hills, 90210) – David Charvet (Baywatch)
- TV star female: Shannen Doherty (Beverly Hills, 90210) – Jennie Garth (Beverly Hills, 90210) – Christina Applegate (Married... with Children)
- TV moderator: Kristiane Backer (VJ on MTV) – Linda de Mol (Traumhochzeit) – Thomas Gottschalk (Wetten, dass..?)
- band rock/pop: 4 Non Blondes – Take That – Ace of Base
- band hard 'n heavy: Bon Jovi – Guns N' Roses – Scorpions
- male athlete: Marc-Kevin Goellner – Michael Stich – Michael Schumacher
- female athlete: Franziska van Almsick – Steffi Graf – Anke Huber
- wrestler: Bret 'Hitman' Hart – Hulk Hogan – Lex Luger

=== 1994 ===
- actor: Keanu Reeves – Tom Hanks – Kevin Costner
- actress: Whoopi Goldberg – Julia Roberts – Winona Ryder
- male singer: Michael Jackson – Joshua Kadison – Bryan Adams
- female singer: Mariah Carey – Janet Jackson – Madonna
- dancefloor: DJ BoBo – 2 Unlimited – Whigfield
- rap & techno: Marusha – Mark 'Oh – The Prodigy
- TV star male: Luke Perry (Beverly Hills, 90210) – Jonathan Brandis (seaQuest DSV) – Joe Lando (Dr. Quinn, Medicine Woman)
- TV star female: Jennie Garth (Beverly Hills, 90210) – Shannen Doherty (Beverly Hills, 90210) – Pamela Anderson (Baywatch)
- TV moderator: Kristiane Backer (VJ on MTV) – Ray Cokes (MTV's Most Wanted) – Arabella Kiesbauer (Arabella)
- band pop: Take That – Worlds Apart – East 17
- band rock: Bon Jovi – Aerosmith – Nirvana

=== 1995 ===
- actor: Brad Pitt – Tom Hanks – Johnny Depp
- actress: Sandra Bullock – Alicia Silverstone – Whoopi Goldberg
- male singer: Michael Jackson – DJ BoBo – Mark 'Oh
- female singer: Janet Jackson – Mariah Carey – Whigfield
- TV star male: Stephen Dürr (Unter uns) – Joe Lando (Dr. Quinn, Medicine Woman) – Maximilian Grill (So ist das Leben! Die Wagenfelds)
- TV star female: Heike Makatsch (VJ on VIVA) – Pamela Anderson (Baywatch) – Valerie Niehaus (Verbotene Liebe)
- band pop: The Kelly Family – Caught in the Act – Take That
- band rock: Bon Jovi – Die Ärzte – Green Day

=== 1996 ===
- actor: Tom Cruise – Brad Pitt – Tom Hanks
- actress: Sandra Bullock – Michelle Pfeiffer – Pamela Anderson
- male singer: Peter André – Michael Jackson – DJ BoBo
- female singer: Blümchen – Alanis Morissette – Mariah Carey
- TV star male: David Duchovny (The X-Files) – Jared Leto (My So-Called Life) – Ralf Bauer (Gegen den Wind)
- TV star female: Gillian Anderson (The X-Files) – Jasmin Gerat (Bravo TV) – Valerie Niehaus (Verbotene Liebe)
- band pop: Backstreet Boys – The Kelly Family – Caught in the Act
- band rock: Die Toten Hosen – Bon Jovi – Die Ärzte
- Platinum-OTTO: Bee Gees

=== 1997 ===
- actor: Leonardo DiCaprio – Will Smith – Brad Pitt
- actress: Claire Danes – Sandra Bullock – Julia Roberts
- male singer: Aaron Carter – Michael Jackson – Puff Daddy
- female singer: Blümchen – Mariah Carey – Janet Jackson
- TV star male: David Duchovny (The X-Files) – Daniel Fehlow (Gute Zeiten, schlechte Zeiten) – Jared Leto (My So-Called Life)
- TV star female: Gillian Anderson (The X-Files) – Rhea Harder (Gute Zeiten, schlechte Zeiten) – Alexandra Neldel (Gute Zeiten, schlechte Zeiten)
- band pop: Backstreet Boys – The Kelly Family – Caught in the Act
- band rock: Bon Jovi – Rammstein – Die Toten Hosen

=== 1998 ===
- actor: Leonardo DiCaprio – Til Schweiger – David Duchovny
- actress: Kate Winslet – Sandra Bullock – Julia Roberts
- male singer: Oli.P – Sasha – Christian Wunderlich
- female singer: Céline Dion – Blümchen – Young Deenay
- hip-hop & rap: Puff Daddy – Sabrina Setlur – Thomas D
- TV star male: David Duchovny (The X-Files) – Oliver Petszokat (Gute Zeiten, schlechte Zeiten) – Christian Wunderlich (Verbotene Liebe)
- TV star female: Gillian Anderson (The X-Files) – Alexandra Neldel (Gute Zeiten, schlechte Zeiten) – Rhea Harder (Gute Zeiten, schlechte Zeiten)
- band pop: Backstreet Boys – The Kelly Family – Echt
- band rock: Aerosmith – Guano Apes – Die Ärzte

=== 1999 ===
- actor: Leonardo DiCaprio – Freddie Prinze, Jr. – Ryan Phillippe
- actress: Julia Roberts – Rachael Leigh Cook – Sarah Michelle Gellar
- male singer: Oli.P – Sasha – Lou Bega
- female singer: Britney Spears – Christina Aguilera – Blümchen
- hip-hop: Die 3. Generation – Will Smith – Puff Daddy
- TV star male: Tim Sander (Gute Zeiten, schlechte Zeiten) – David Duchovny (The X-Files) – Oliver Petszokat (Gute Zeiten, schlechte Zeiten)
- TV star female: Sarah Michelle Gellar (Buffy the Vampire Slayer) – Gillian Anderson (The X-Files) – Rhea Harder (Gute Zeiten, schlechte Zeiten)
- band: The Kelly Family – Backstreet Boys – Echt

=== 2000 ===
- actor: Leonardo DiCaprio – Freddie Prinze, Jr. – Brad Pitt
- actress: Julia Roberts – Jennifer Lopez – Sandra Bullock
- male singer: Sasha – Christian – Robbie Williams
- female singer: Britney Spears – Jeanette Biedermann – Jennifer Lopez
- hip-hop international: Eminem – Puff Daddy – Wu-Tang Clan
- hip-hop national: DJ Tomekk – Fünf Sterne deluxe – Die Fantastischen Vier
- TV star male: David Boreanaz (Buffy the Vampire Slayer) – David Duchovny (The X-Files) – Tim Sander (Gute Zeiten, schlechte Zeiten)
- TV star female: Sarah Michelle Gellar (Buffy the Vampire Slayer) – Jeanette Biedermann (Gute Zeiten, schlechte Zeiten) – Gillian Anderson (The X-Files)
- band pop: The Kelly Family – Backstreet Boys – ATC
- band rock: Bon Jovi – HIM – Limp Bizkit
- comedy star: Stefan Raab (TV total) – Michael Mittermeier – Gaby Köster (Ritas Welt)
- shootingstar male: Craig David
- shootingstar female: Destiny's Child

=== 2001 ===
- actor: Josh Hartnett – Daniel Radcliffe – Michael 'Bully' Herbig
- actress: Julia Roberts – Jennifer Lopez – Sandra Bullock
- male singer: Robbie Williams – Sasha – Enrique Iglesias
- female singer: Kylie Minogue – Sarah Connor – Britney Spears
- hip-hop international: Nelly – Eminem – Eve
- hip-hop national: Samy Deluxe – Fettes Brot – Blumentopf
- TV star male: David Boreanaz (Buffy the Vampire Slayer) – Felix von Jascheroff (Gute Zeiten, schlechte Zeiten) – James Marsters (Buffy the Vampire Slayer)
- TV star female: Sarah Michelle Gellar (Buffy the Vampire Slayer) – Jeanette Biedermann (Gute Zeiten, schlechte Zeiten) – Melissa Joan Hart (Sabrina the Teenage Witch)
- band pop: No Angels – O-Town – Destiny's Child
- band rock: Linkin Park – Limp Bizkit – Bon Jovi
- comedy star: Stefan Raab (TV total) – Kaya Yanar (Was guckst du?!) – Michael 'Bully' Herbig (Bullyparade)
- shootingstar solo: Shakira
- shootingstar band: Bro'Sis
- special OTTO: DJ BoBo

=== 2002 ===
- actor: Orlando Bloom – Daniel Radcliffe – Elijah Wood
- actress: Jennifer Lopez – Liv Tyler – Julia Roberts
- male singer: Robbie Williams – Ben – Marlon
- female singer: Jeanette Biedermann – Avril Lavigne – Christina Aguilera
- hip-hop international: Nelly – Eminem – Ja Rule
- hip-hop national: Massive Töne – DJ Tomekk – Fettes Brot
- TV star male: James Marsters (Buffy the Vampire Slayer) – Felix von Jascheroff (Gute Zeiten, schlechte Zeiten) – David Boreanaz (Buffy the Vampire Slayer)
- TV star female: Sarah Michelle Gellar (Buffy the Vampire Slayer) – Jeanette Biedermann (Gute Zeiten, schlechte Zeiten) – Jessica Alba (Dark Angel)
- band pop: No Angels – Natural – Westlife
- band rock: Busted – Linkin Park – Bon Jovi
- comedy star: Stefan Raab (TV total) – Anke Engelke (Anke) – Michael Mittermeier
- shooting star solo: Avril Lavigne
- shooting star band: Busted
- special OTTO: Nena

=== 2003 ===
- actor: Orlando Bloom – Elijah Wood – Daniel Radcliffe
- actress: Liv Tyler – Emma Watson – Keira Knightley
- male singer: Justin Timberlake – Daniel Küblböck – Alexander Klaws
- female singer: Jeanette Biedermann – Christina Aguilera – Sarah Connor
- hip-hop international: The Black Eyed Peas – Eminem – Sean Paul
- hip-hop national: Eko Fresh – DJ Tomekk – Sabrina Setlur
- TV star male: Felix von Jascheroff (Gute Zeiten, schlechte Zeiten) – Tom Welling (Smallville) – James Marsters (Buffy the Vampire Slayer)
- TV Star female: Jeanette Biedermann (Gute Zeiten, schlechte Zeiten) – Sarah Michelle Gellar (Buffy the Vampire Slayer) – Yvonne Catterfeld (Gute Zeiten, schlechte Zeiten)
- band pop: Overground – No Angels – B3
- band rock: The Rasmus – Linkin Park – Busted
- comedy star: Stefan Raab (TV total) – Anke Engelke (Ladykracher) – Ingo Oschmann (Star Search)
- shooting star: Patrick Nuo
- special OTTO: Kylie Minogue

=== 2004 ===
- actor: Brad Pitt – Daniel Radcliffe – Orlando Bloom
- actress: Olsen Twins – Hilary Duff – Emma Watson
- male singer: Usher – Alexander Klaws – Robbie Williams
- female singer: Sarah Connor – Jeanette Biedermann – Christina Aguilera
- hip-hop international: 50 Cent – The Black Eyed Peas – Eminem
- hip-hop national: Sido – Die Fantastischen Vier – Samy Deluxe
- TV star male: Chad Michael Murray (Gilmore Girls) – Milo Ventimiglia (Gilmore Girls) – Miloš Vuković (Unter uns)
- TV star female: Alexis Bledel (Gilmore Girls) – Olsen Twins – Yvonne Catterfeld (Gute Zeiten, schlechte Zeiten)
- band pop: Silbermond – Overground – Vanilla Ninja
- band rock: Maroon 5 – Linkin Park – The Rasmus
- comedy star: Oliver Pocher (Rent a Pocher) – Michael 'Bully' Herbig (Bully & Rick) – Stefan Raab (TV total)
- shooting star: Juli
- Honorary-OTTO: Scooter
- Platinum-OTTO: Thomas Gottschalk

=== 2005 ===
- actor: Daniel Radcliffe – Brad Pitt – Jimi Blue Ochsenknecht
- actress: Emma Watson – Angelina Jolie – Jessica Alba
- male singer: Marc Terenzi – Robbie Williams – Xavier Naidoo
- female singer: Sarah Connor – Kelly Clarkson – Christina Stürmer
- hip-hop international: 50 Cent – Eminem – The Black Eyed Peas
- hip-hop national: Fettes Brot – Bushido – Samy Deluxe
- TV star male: Jörn Schlönvoigt (Gute Zeiten, schlechte Zeiten) – Felix von Jascheroff (Gute Zeiten, schlechte Zeiten) – Ben (Bravo TV)
- TV star female: Gülcan (VJ on VIVA) – Alexandra Neldel (Verliebt in Berlin) – Mischa Barton (The O.C.)
- band pop: US5 – Pussycat Dolls – Backstreet Boys
- band rock: Tokio Hotel – Green Day – Rammstein
- comedy star: Oliver Pocher (Rent a Pocher) – Mario Barth – Ralf Schmitz (Die Dreisten Drei)
- school band: nur*so – The Black Sheep

=== 2006 ===
- actor: Johnny Depp – Jimi Blue Ochsenknecht – Zac Efron
- actress: Emma Watson – Keira Knightley – Angelina Jolie
- male singer: Justin Timberlake – Xavier Naidoo – Marc Terenzi
- female singer: Sarah Connor – LaFee – Christina Aguilera
- hip-hop international: Eminem – 50 Cent – 2Pac
- hip-hop national: Bushido – Sido – Eko Fresh
- TV star male: Benjamin McKenzie (The O.C.) – Jörn Schlönvoigt (Gute Zeiten, schlechte Zeiten) – Tim Sander (Verliebt in Berlin)
- TV star female: Gülcan (Bravo TV) – Alyssa Milano (Charmed) – Eva Longoria (Desperate Housewives)
- band pop: US5 – Monrose – Pussycat Dolls
- band rock: Tokio Hotel – Killerpilze – Revolverheld
- comedy star: Oliver Pocher (Pochers WM-Countdown) – Mario Barth – Otto Waalkes
- Honorary OTTO: Beyoncé

=== 2007 ===
- actor: Benjamin McKenzie – Daniel Radcliffe – Johnny Depp – Jimi Blue Ochsenknecht
- actress: Emma Watson – Keira Knightley – Nora Tschirner
- male singer: Jimi Blue Ochsenknecht – Justin Timberlake – Jörn Schlönvoigt
- female singer: LaFee – Ashley Tisdale – Sarah Connor
- hip-hop international: Timbaland – Eminem – 50 Cent
- hip-hop national: Bushido – Sido – K.I.Z
- TV star male: Zac Efron (High School Musical) – Wentworth Miller (Prison Break) – Drake Bell (Drake & Josh)
- TV star female: Vanessa Hudgens (High School Musical) – Ashley Tisdale (High School Musical) – Miley Cyrus (Hannah Montana)
- band pop: US5 – Monrose – Culcha Candela
- band rock: Linkin Park – Tokio Hotel – Panik
- comedy star: Oliver Pocher (Schmidt & Pocher) – Mario Barth – Stefan Raab (TV total)
- Honorary OTTO: Til Schweiger
- Platinum-OTTO: Dieter Bohlen
- Shootingstar-OTTO: Wentworth Miller

=== 2008 ===
- actor: Robert Pattinson – Kristen Stewart – Vanessa Hudgens
- singer: Miley Cyrus – Britney Spears – Bushido
- band: Tokio Hotel – US5 – Monrose
- TV star: Zac Efron (High School Musical) – Vanessa Hudgens (High School Musical)

=== 2009 ===
- actor: Emma Watson – Robert Pattinson – Rupert Grint
- singer: Michael Jackson – Jeanette Biedermann – Selena Gomez
- band: Tokio Hotel – Monrose – Sunrise Avenue
- films: Twilight
- athlete: Matthias Steiner

=== 2010 ===
- Actor/Actress: Miley Cyrus – Ashley Tisdale – Johnny Depp
- Band: Die Atzen (Frauenarzt and Manny Marc) – Sunrise Avenue – Monrose
- Male singer: Justin Bieber – Michael Jackson – Sido
- Female singer: Kesha – Rihanna – Christina Aguilera
- TV Star – Female: Selena Gomez (Wizards of Waverly Place) – Maja Maneiro (Anna und die Liebe) – Jeanette Biedermann (Anna und die Liebe)
- TV Star – Male: Zac Efron – Elyas M'Barek (Doctor's Diary) – Roy Peter Link (Anna und die Liebe)
- Shooting Star: Emily Osment

=== 2011 ===
- Film Star – Male: Robert Pattinson – Matthias Schweighöfer – Johnny Depp
- Film Star – Female: Kristen Stewart – Selena Gomez – Emma Watson
- TV Star – Male: Neil Patrick Harris (How I Met Your Mother) – Tom Beck (Alarm für Cobra 11) – Dieter Bohlen (Deutschland sucht den Superstar)
- TV Star – Female: Selena Gomez (Wizards of Waverly Place) – Daniela Katzenberger (Daniela Katzenberger – natürlich blond) – Victoria Justice (Victorious)
- Super Singer – Male: Justin Bieber – Bruno Mars – Michael Jackson
- Super Singer – Female: Rihanna – Adele – Selena Gomez
- Super Rapper: Die Atzen – Pitbull – Casper
- Super Rock Band: Thirty Seconds to Mars – Linkin Park – Tokio Hotel
- Super Pop Band: Big Time Rush – LMFAO – The Black Pony
- Comedian: Bülent Ceylan - Sascha Grammel - Mario Barth
- Internet Star: Y-Titty – Justin Bieber – Steve Jobs

=== 2012 ===
- Film Star – Male: Robert Pattinson – Matthias Schweighöfer – Johnny Depp
- Film Star – Female: Kristen Stewart – Emma Watson – Jennifer Lawrence
- TV Star – Female: Selena Gomez (Wizards of Waverly Place) – Daniela Katzenberger (Daniela Katzenberger – natürlich blond) – Nina Dobrev (The Vampire Diaries)
- TV Star – Male: Tom Beck (Alarm für Cobra 11) – Neil Patrick Harris (How I Met Your Mother) – Ian Somerhalder (The Vampire Diaries)
- Super Singer – Male: Daniele Negroni – Luca Hänni – Justin Bieber
- Super Singer – Female: Selena Gomez – Rihanna – Taylor Swift
- Super Rapper: Cro – Casper – Nicki Minaj
- Super Rock Band: Linkin Park – Die Toten Hosen – Green Day
- Super Pop Band: One Direction – Big Time Rush – Jedward
- Comedian: Bülent Ceylan – Cindy aus Marzahn – Kaya Yanar
- Internet-Star: Y-Titty – Cimorelli – One Direction

=== 2013 ===
- Superstar: Samu Haber – Justin Bieber – Daniele Negroni
- TV-Star: Tom Beck (Alarm für Cobra 11) – Ian Somerhalder (The Vampire Diaries) – Bülent Ceylan (Die Bülent Ceylan Show)
- Movie Star: Josh Hutcherson – Jennifer Lawrence – Matthias Schweighöfer
- Newcomer of the Year: Little Mix – James Arthur – Macklemore
- Checker of the Year: Louis Tomlinson – Justin Bieber – Kay One
- Sexy Babe: Selena Gomez – Miley Cyrus – Rihanna
- Super-Hottie: Harry Styles – Tom Beck – Luca Hänni
- Super-BFFs: Selena Gomez & Taylor Swift – Justin Bieber & Chris Brown – Vanessa Hudgens & Ashley Tisdale
- Hot Couple of the Year: Sarah & Pietro – Perrie Edwards & Zayn Malik – Jim Parsons & Todd Spiewak

=== 2015 ===
- Super-male-Singer: Ed Sheeran – Tom Beck – Justin Bieber
- Super-female-Singer: Lena – Jasmine Thompson – Ariana Grande
- Super-Band: One Direction – Fifth Harmony – Sunrise Avenue
- Super-Rapper: Farid Bang – Cro – Nicki Minaj
- Super-Film-Star male: Elyas M'Barek – Max von der Groeben – Josh Hutcherson
- Super-Film-Star female: Jella Haase – Jennifer Lawrence – Anna Kendrick
- Super-TV-Star male: Jorge Blanco – Joko & Klaas – Ian Somerhalder
- Super-TV-Star female: Martina Stoessel – Palina Rojinski – Kaley Cuoco
- Social-Media-Star: ApeCrime – Melina Sophie – Julien Bam

=== 2016 ===
- Social-Media-Star: Lisa and Lena
- Super-female-Singer: Martina Stoessel
- Super-male Singer: Shawn Mendes
- Super-Band: New District
- Super-Film/TV-Star female: Karol Sevilla
- Super-Film/TV-Star male: Ruggero Pasquarelli

=== 2017 ===
- Super-Film/TV-Star: Tim Oliver Schultz
- Super-Singer: Shawn Mendes
- Super-Band/Duo: Marcus & Martinus
- Super-Social-Media: Die Lochis

=== 2021 ===
- Best Series: Riverdale, 13 Reasons Why, Stranger Things
- Singer: Shawn Mendes, Mike Singer, Lina
- Band/Duo: Blackpink, Die Lochis, Marcus & Martinus
- Hip-Hop: Cardi B, Loredana, Bausa
- YouTuber: Bianca Heinicke, Julien Bam, Joey Heindle
