= Axel Stein =

German actor and comedian (born 1982)

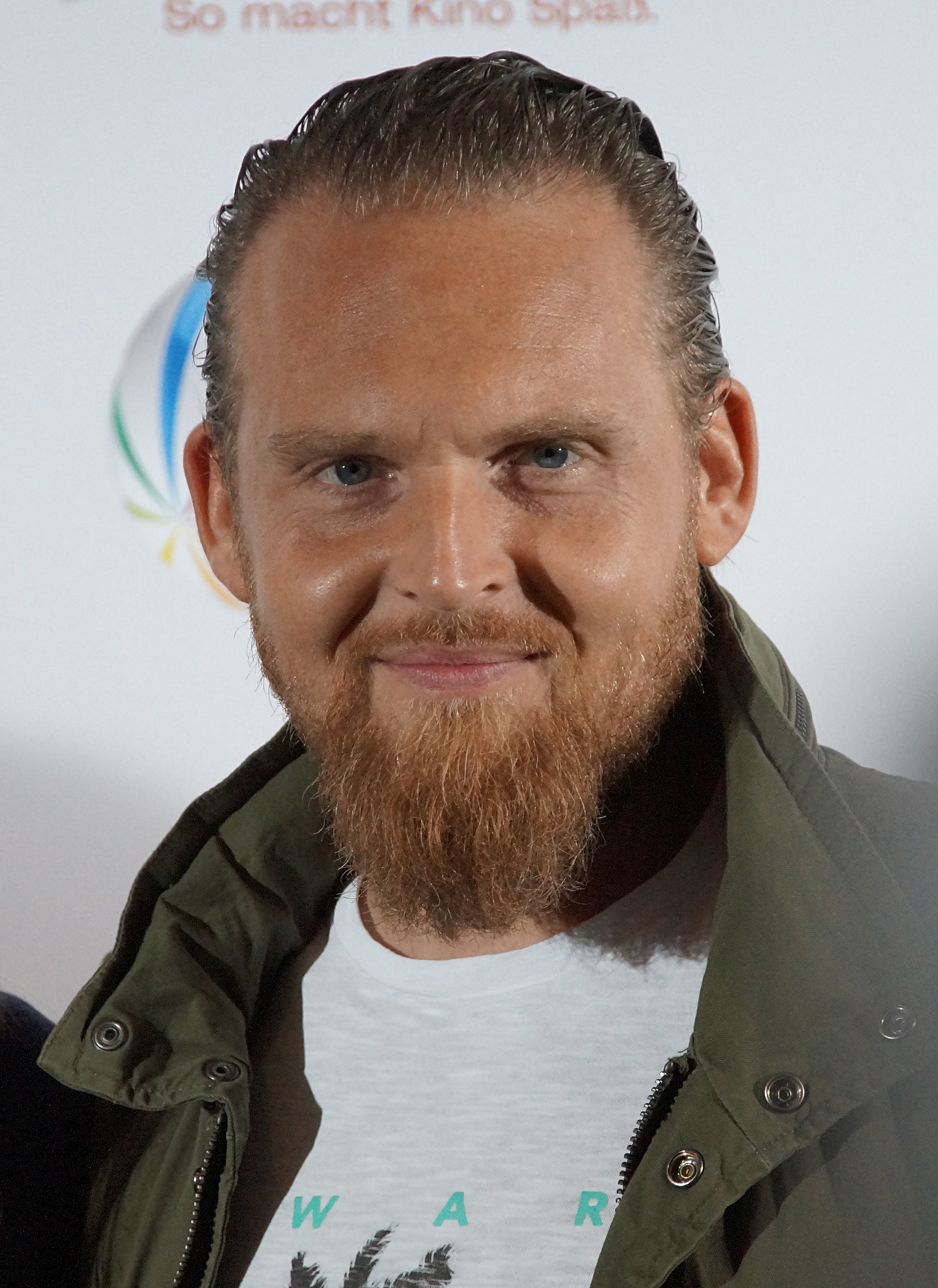
Stein in 2016

Axel Stein (born 28 February 1982) is a German actor and comedian.

He was born in Wuppertal and works as an actor in German television and cinema productions.

== Filmography ==
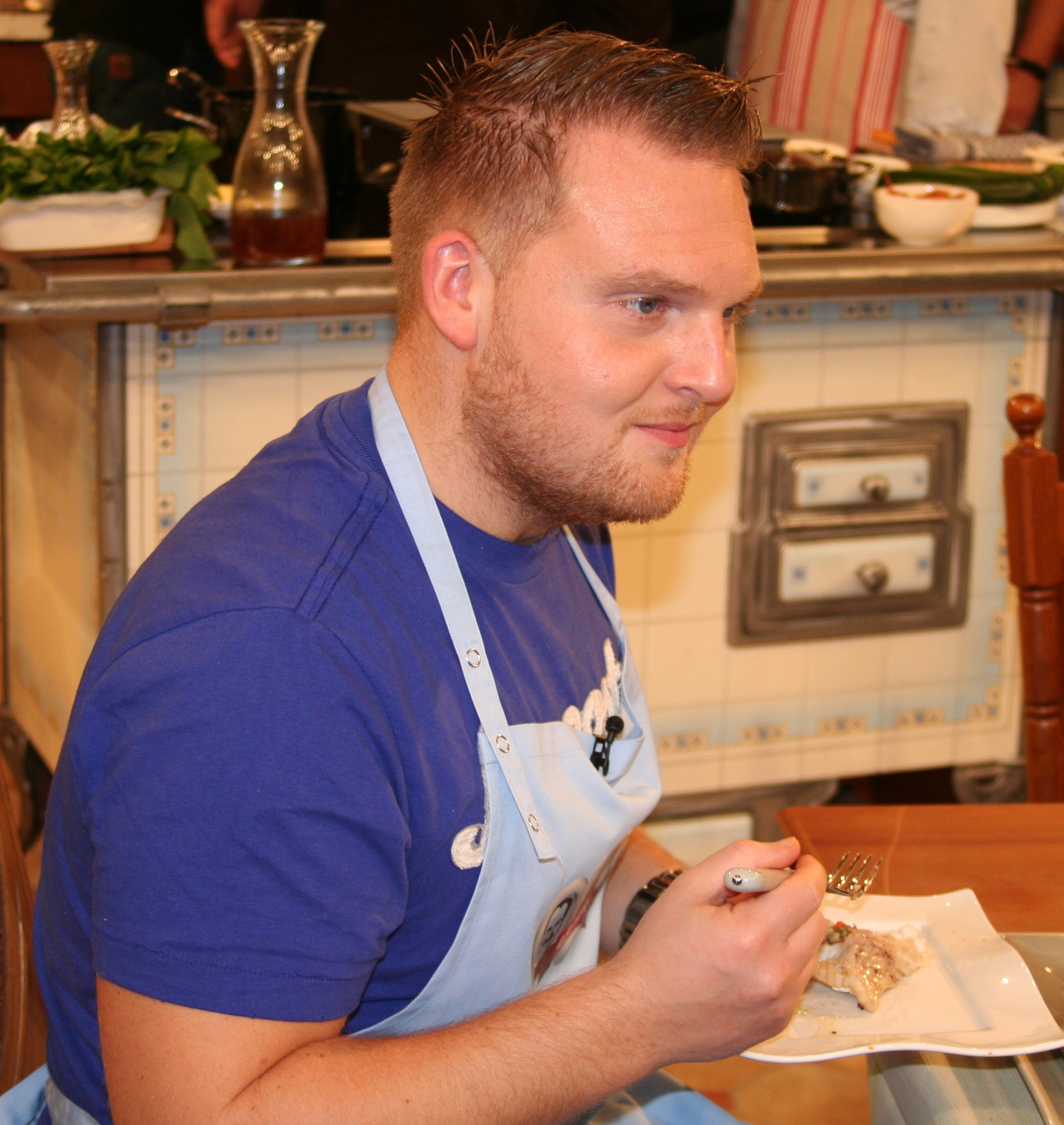
Stein in 2010

- 1999–2008: Hausmeister Krause (TV series, 80 episodes), as Tommie Krause
- 2000: Ants in the Pants, as Red Bull
- 2000: Balko: Der Campingplatzmörder (TV series episode), as Andreas Krause
- 2000: Der Superbulle und die Halbstarken (TV film), as Kamikaze
- 2000: No More School, as Dirk
- 2001: SK Kölsch: Bock geschossen (TV series episode), as Robbie Sievernich
- 2001: Der Fahnder: Rache und Geständnis (TV series episode)
- 2001: Rent a Baby (TV film), as Willi Müller
- 2002: Feuer, Eis & Dosenbier, as Josch
- 2002: More Ants in the Pants, as Red Bull
- 2002: Nüchtern eingeschlafen, betrunken aufgewacht! (short film), as Dr. Tod
- 2002–2004: Axel! (TV series, 35 episodes), as Axel
- 2003: Hallo Robbie!: Robbie als Star (TV series episode), as Andi Texel
- 2003: Die Klasse von '99, as Schmidt
- 2003: Our Charly: Charly sieht alles (TV series episode), as Pit
- 2004: Snowfever, as Barney
- 2005: Barefoot, as Dieter Huhn (Cameo)
- 2005–2006: Axel! will's wissen (TV series, 26 episodes), as Axel
- 2006: Rapunzel oder Mord ist Ihr Hobby (TV film), as Eppo
- 2006: 7 Dwarves: The Forest Is Not Enough, as Sausage Seller (Cameo)
- 2007: Hänsel und Gretel – Ein Fall für die Supergranny (TV film), as Hänsel
- 2007: Military Academy, as UFO
- 2007: Tell, as Val-tah
- 2008: Run for Your Life!, as Kurt
- 2008: H3 – Halloween Horror Hostel (TV film), as Acki
- 2008: Eine wie keiner (TV film), as Mattuschek
- 2008: Instructor Schmidt, as Rainer Zielinski
- 2008: Cologne P.D.: Die stumme Zeugin (TV series episode), as Steven Kunz
- 2009: Mord ist mein Geschäft, Liebling, as Dirk
- 2009: The Crocodiles, as Kevin
- 2010: Lutter: Rote Erde (TV series episode), as Mike Hampe
- 2010–2011: Alarm für Cobra 11 – Die Autobahnpolizei (TV series, 2 episodes), as Turbo
- 2010: SOKO München: Tod eines Hochzeitsplaners (TV series episode), as Chris Dähling
- 2011: Die Superbullen, as Markus
- 2011: The Crocodiles: All for One, as Kevin
- 2011: Rookie – Fast platt (TV film), as Rookie
- 2012: Der Blender (TV film), as Justin
- 2012: Guardians, as Leo
- 2012: Men Do What They Can, as Bode
- 2012: Die Karawane der verfluchten Jungfrauen (TV film), as Aydin El Macko / Aischee
- 2012: Cologne P.D.: Mit Hieb und Stich (TV series episode), as Thorsten Meineke
- 2013: Turbo & Tacho (TV film), as Turbo
- 2014: Not My Day, as Till Reiners
- 2014: Add a Friend: Wer hat Angst vorm bösen Klaus? (TV series episode), as Günni Bommels
- 2015: 3 Türken und ein Baby, as Gunnar Caro
- 2015: Verliebt, verlobt, vertauscht (TV film), as Flo
- 2015: Storno: Todsicher versichert (TV film), as Schulze
- 2015: Big Fish, Small Fish (TV film), as Piet Grambauer
- 2015: Macho Man, as Ulli
- 2015: Help, I Shrunk My Teacher, as Peter Vorndran
- 2015: Bruder vor Luder, as Ulf
- 2016: Seitenwechsel, as Moritz
- 2016: Männertag, as Klaus-Maria
- 2016: Volltreffer (TV film), as Philipp
- 2016: Dating Alarm (TV film), as Friedrich
- 2017: Ice Man (2017 film), as Gris
- 2017: Schatz, nimm du sie!, as Paul
- 2017: Abi '97 – gefühlt wie damals (TV film), as Jochen
- 2019: The Goldfish as Rainer ‘Rainman’ Schnellinger
- 2020: The Magic Kids: Three Unlikely Heroes as Hausmeister Hannappel
- 2021: The Vault, as Klaus
- 2021: Over & Out, as Karl
- 2024: Where's Wanda?, as Dedo Klatt

=== Voice acting ===
- 2008: Bolt, as Rhino (German version)
- 2010: A Turtle's Tale: Sammy's Adventures, as Ray (German version)
- 2012: A Turtle's Tale 2: Sammy's Escape from Paradise, as Ray (German version)

=== Director ===
- 2014: Tape 13

=== As Himself ===
- 2010: Grip – Das Motormagazin – "Lamborghini Gallardo Superleggera"
- 2011: Grip – Das Motormagazin – "Lamborghini Aventador"
- 2011: Grip – Das Motormagazin – "Skoda Yeti in Las Vegas"
- 2012: Grip – Das Motormagazin – "Skoda Yeti in Namibia"

== Awards ==
- 2002: German Comedy Awards: Best Newcomer Comedy
- 2002: German Comedy Awards: Best Comedy serie for Hausmeister Krause
- 2002: German Comedy Awards: Best film for More Ants in the Pants
- 2002: Rising Movie Talent Award: Best Newcomer
- 2003: Jupiter Award: Best Newcomer
