= Bravo TV (TV series) =

German TV program

BRAVO TV is a German television program which aired from January 1985 till December 1986 on Sat.1 and from May 1993 till December 2002 on RTL II. In February 2003, the ZDF took over the show, but it was cancelled due to bad ratings in November 2004. The show later had a short-lived revival on ProSieben and was aired again for the first time on November 5, 2005. In May 2007 it was cancelled for good.

The television show covered similar topics as the BRAVO print magazine. It usually included detailed music charts, more-or-less prominent guests, sexual education topics, and a music video selected by the viewers at the end of the show.

The broadcast format was developed by former Bravo photographer Wolfgang Heilemann.

== Hosts ==
BRAVO TV was hosted by the following presenters:

- Kristiane Backer (1993–1995)
- Heike Makatsch (1995–1996)
- Jasmin Gerat (1996–1997)
- Lori Stern (1997–1998)
- Nova Meierhenrich with Kerstin Kramer and Florian Wahlberg (1998–1999)
- Enie van de Meiklokjes (1999–2001)
- Collien Fernandes and Sebastian Höffner (2001–2002)
- Mia Aegerter (2004)
- Ben (2005–2006)
- Gülcan (2006–2007)
