= Manuela (singer) =

German singer (1943–2001)

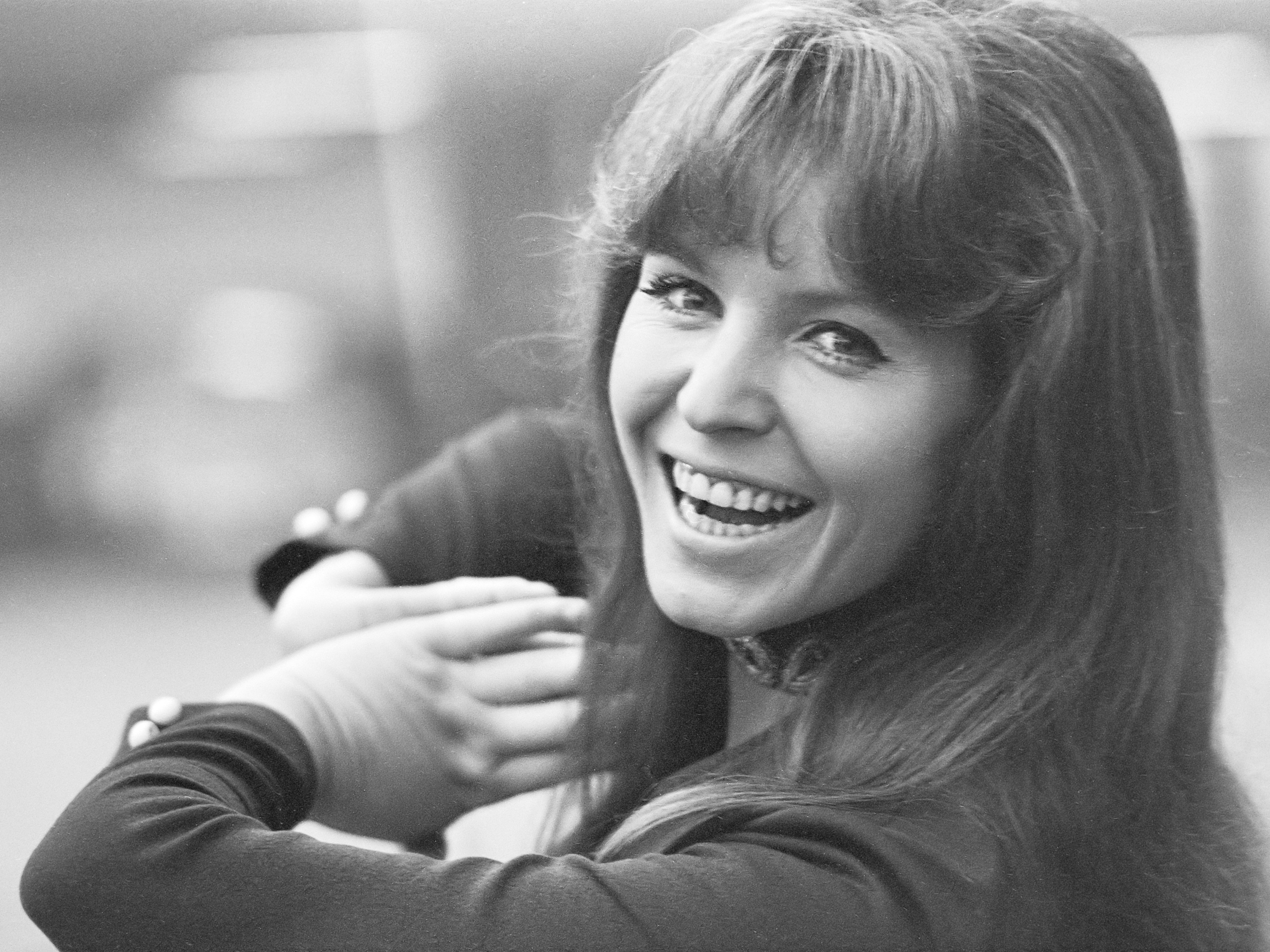
- Manuela in 1971
- Born: Doris Inge Wegener; 18 August 1943; Berlin, Germany
- Died: 13 February 2001 (aged 57); Berlin, Germany
- Occupation: Singer

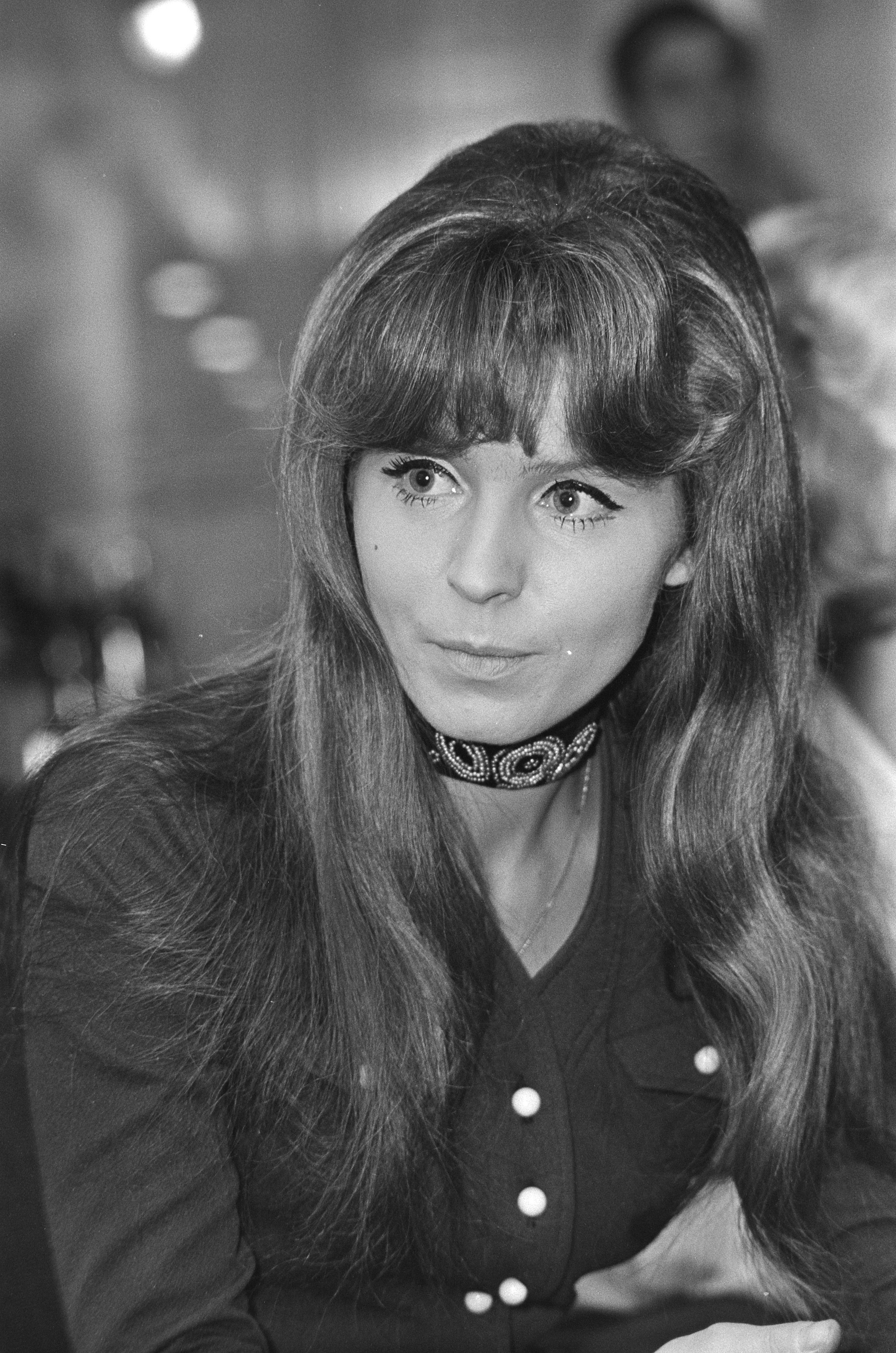
Manuela (1971)

Doris Inge Wegener (German pronunciation: [ˈdoːʁɪs ˈɪŋə ˈʋeːɡənɐ]; 18 August 1943 – 13 February 2001), better known by her stage name Manuela [manuˈeːla], was a German singer.

== Background ==
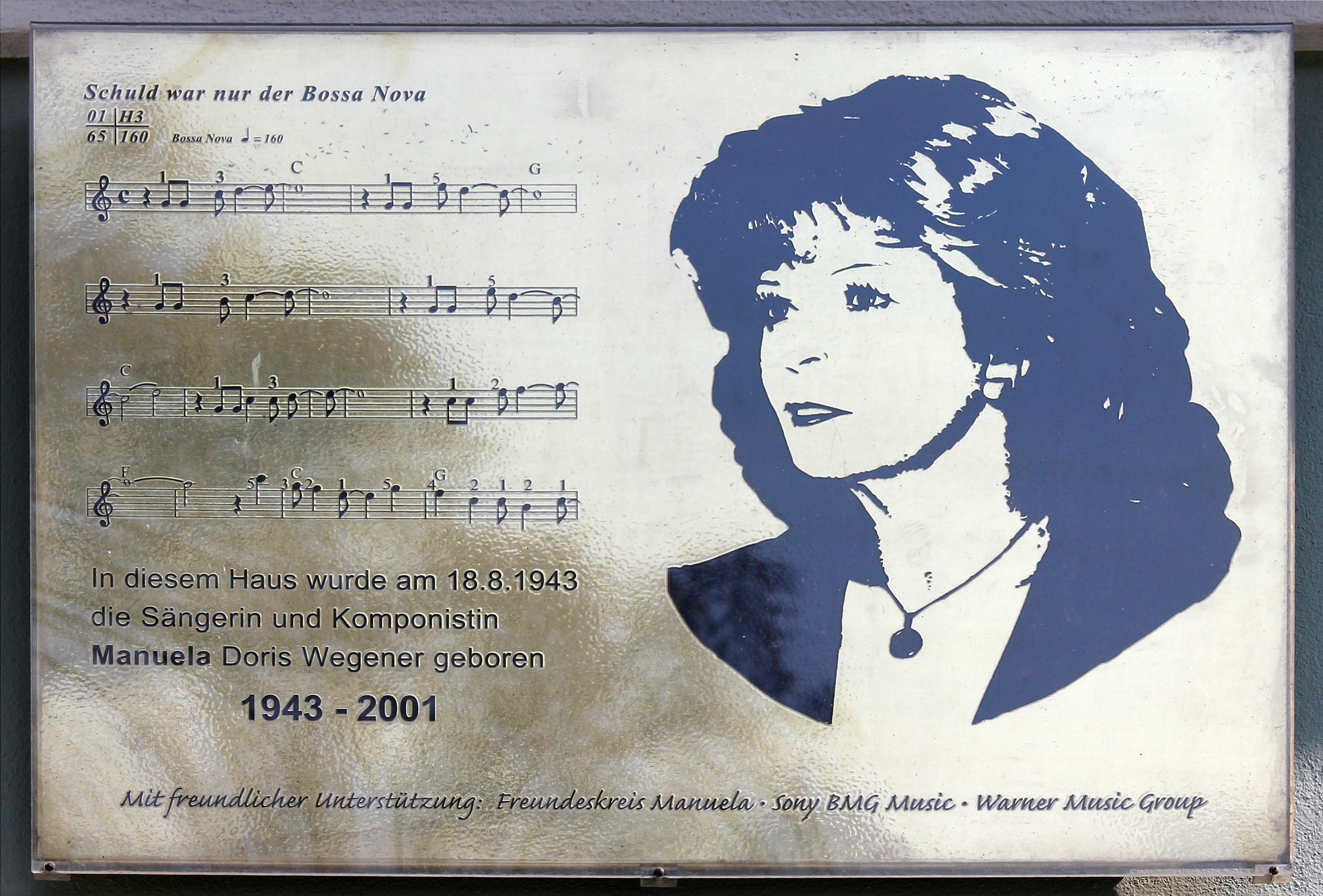
Commemorative plaque at house, Thurneysserstraße 3, in Berlin-Gesundbrunnen

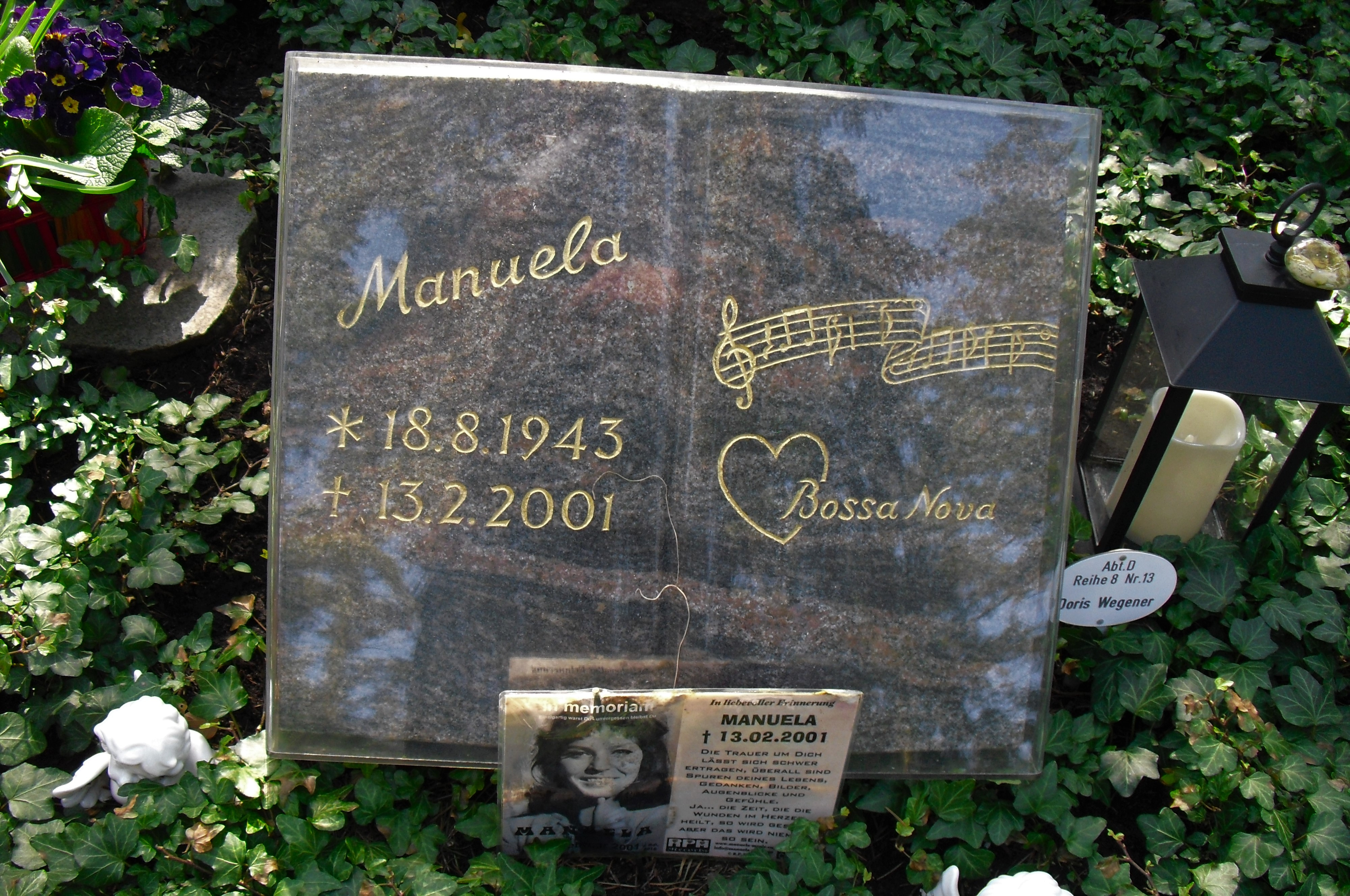
Manuela's grave in Barnabasstraße 13, Tegel

Manuela was born and died in Berlin. She worked in Germany as a singer of Schlager songs. She played in some German films like Im singenden Rößl am Königssee (1963), Twenty Girls and the Teachers (1971) and Schuld war nur der Bossa Nova (1992).

== Career ==
Paul Seigel reported in the 25 September 1971 issue of Record World that 2,000,000 German marks had been paid for Manuela, a Telefunken-Decca artist to come to the BASF record label. Record company executives were apparently worried about holding on to their artists.

== Discography ==
=== Singles ===
Date	Title	Notes
1962	Hula-Serenade	
1963	Schuld war nur der Bossa Nova	German version of Blame It on the Bossa Nova
1963	Ich geh noch zur Schule	German version of On Top of Old Smoky
1963	Mama, ich sag' dir was	
1963	Hey, Manuela	EP
1964	Mama	EP; Spain release
1964	Schwimmen lernt man im See	German version of Just So Bobby Can See by Diane Ray
1964	Horch, was kommt von draußen rein	An English version, There Goes Charly, was released on the B-side of Mama
1964	Schneemann	
1964	Manuela	Spain release
1964	Schwimmen lernt man im See	EP
1965	Küsse unterm Regenbogen	
1965	Love and Kisses	
1965	The Nitty Gritty	
1965	Things Are So Different	Brazil release
1966	Es ist zum Weinen	
1966	Dumme sterben niemals aus	
1966	Spotlight on Manuela	Netherlands release
1966	Die goldene Zeit	with Drafi Deutscher
1967	Lord Leicester aus Manchester	
1967	Monsieur Dupont	
1967	Wenn es Nacht wird in Harlem	German version of When a Man Loves a Woman by Percy Sledge
1968	Guantanamera	German version of the Spanish-language original
1968	Stille Nacht Heilige Nacht	
1968	Que-Sara	
1968	Señor Gonzales	
1968	Bobby	
1969	Wenn du liebst/Jingle Jangle	Double A-side of the Archies song in German and English
1969	Helicopter U.S. Navy 66	About Helicopter 66
1966	Manuela macht Mode mit Musik	
1970	Alles und noch viel mehr	German version of All Kinds of Everything
1970	ABC	
1970	Verliebt in Amsterdam	
1970	Daddy	German version of Grandad
1970	It Takes a Lot of Tenderness	
1971	Monky Monkey	USA release
1971	I Hear Those Church Bells Ringing	
1971	Der schwarze Mann auf dem Dach	German version of Jack in the Box
1971	Prost, Onkel Albert	
1972	Es lebe das Geburtstagskind	
1972	Ich hab' mich verliebt in dich	
1972	Gitarren-Boy	
1973	Etwas in mir wurde traurig	German version of Killing Me Softly with His Song
1973	Da sagen sich die Füchse gute Nacht	
1973	Komm wieder	
1973	Was hast du gemacht	
1973	Ich war noch nie so glücklich	
1973	Hey Look at Me Now	
1973	You Are My Music	USA release
1974	Gestohlene Orangen	
1974	Ich möcht gern dein Herz Klopfen hör'n	
1974	Twingel Dingel Dee	
1974	Boing, Boing die Liebe	
1975	Was hast du gemacht	
1975	Fudschijama-Hama-Kimono	
1975	Ein schöner Tag mit viel Musik	
1980	Doch mein Herz bleibt immer in Athen	
1980	I Believe in the USA	
1980	You Are My Sunshine	disco arrangement
1980	Was soll ein Bayer in der Hitparade	with Sepp Haslinger
1980	Friede auf Erden	
1981	It's Hard to Explain	
1984	Und der Wind	
1984	Ich bin wieder da	
1985	Rhodos bei Nacht	
1986	Auf den Stufen zur Akropolis	
1987	Ewiges Feuer	
1988	Oh, Mandolino	
1990	Heimatland	
1990	Für immer	German version of You Got It
1990	When a Man Loves a Woman	
1991	Friede auf Erden	
1991	Freiheit ohne Glück	Manuela and Cantus

== Albums ==
- 1963 Manuela!
- 1965 Die großen Erfolge
- 1966 Manuela & Drafi
- 1968 Rund um die Welt
- 1968 Manuela – Manuela – Manuela (USA)
- 1968 Star-Boutique Manuela. Die großen Erfolge 2
- 1968 Die großen Erfolge 3
- 1969 Weihnachten wie wir es lieben (together with the Schöneberger Sängerknaben)
- 1970 Die großen Erfolge. Made in Germany & USA
- 1970 Lieder aus dem Märchenland (together with Schöneberger Sängerknaben)
- 1971 Songs of Love – Manuela in USA
- 1972 Wenn du in meinen Träumen bei mir bist
- 1972 Portrait in Musik
- 1973 Manuela in Las Vegas
- 1973 Die Liebe hat tausend Namen
- 1973 Ich war noch nie so glücklich
- 1980 I Want to Be a Cowboy's Sweethart
- 1980 Manuela – The golden Hits
- 1980 Manuela singt Manuela
- 1980 Manuela ein musikalisches Porträt
- 1980 Manuela 80
- 1984 Ich bin wieder da
- 1988 Goldene Hits – Das Jubiläumsalbum
- 1988 Ein schöner Tag mit viel Musik
- 1988 Olé Mallorca und 14 goldene Hits
- 1989 Manuela – Ihre größten Erfolge
- 1991 Sehnsucht nach der Heimat
- 1992 Jive Manuela – Die Original Schlager-Tanz-Party
- 1993 Wenn ich erst wieder Boden spür'
- 1993 St. Vincent
- 1994 Die größten Erfolge – Neuaufnahmen
- 1995 ...für den Frieden – gegen den Krieg
- 1997 Schuld war nur der Bossa Nova (Sonia)
- 1999 Manuela – Das Beste – Die Original Hits 1963–1972
- 2000 Manuela – Das Beste – Die Original Hits 1962–1978 – Folge 2
- 2001 Hey Look at Me Now
- 2001 Dich vergessen kann ich nie
- 2001 Golden Stars – The Best of Manuela
- 2001 Schuld war nur der Bossa Nova (3 CDs mit Manuelas größten Erfolgen)
- 2003 Alles und noch viel mehr...
- 2003 Schuld war nur der Bossa Nova
- 2003 Portrait Manuela (gold-serie)
- 2004 Das Beste von Manuela
- 2005 Manuela. Die Liebe hat tausend Namen
- 2007 Manuela Erinnerungen (ihres Komponisten)Chris Brown (Christian Bruhn)
- 2008 Wenn Augen sprechen
- 2010 Manuela Special Edition
- 2011 Weißt du´s noch
- 2011 Schuld war nur der Bossa Nova (Doppel-CD)
- 2011 Schuld war nur der Bossa Nova

== Awards ==
- Bronze-Lion (1964), special award "Goldene Bonny" (1964) and Silver Lion (1968) by Radio Luxemburg
- Coupe d'or, Italy (1965, 1966 and 1967)
- Bravo Otto four times in gold (1966, 1969, 1970 and 1971) and also four times in silver (1965, 1967, 1968 and 1972)
- Goldene Schallplatte (1968)
- Goldene Stimmgabel (1991 and 1992)

== Literature ==
- Kraushaar, E.: Mutmaßungen über Manuela, in: Kraushaar, E.: Rote Lippen. Die ganze Welt des deutschen Schlagers. Hamburg 1983, pages 137–150.
- Herrwerth, T.: Partys, Pop und Petting. Die Sixties im Spiegel der BRAVO. Marburg 1997
- Hoersch, T.: BRAVO 1956–2006. Munich 2006.
- Rentzsch, P.: Einmal zu den Sternen und zurück. Das Buch der Wahrheit. Freier Falke Verlag 2008, pages 203–211, 283 f.
