= Irene Koss =

German actress and presenter (1928–1996)

Irene Koss (3 August 1928 – 1 May 1996) was a German actor and the first television announcer in the Federal Republic of Germany.

== Life ==
Koss was born in Hamburg, the daughter of a cigar merchant. After ballet lessons and acting training, she made her debut, together with Hardy Krüger, in the comedy Der zerbrochne Krug at the Landesbühne Hannover in 1946. She was later engaged at the Hamburg Kammerspiele. Among others, she played together with Lil Dagover.

When Northwestdeutscher Rundfunk (NWDR) was looking for a female programme announcer in 1950, Koss was selected by Hanns Farenburg as a suitable "television face". She made her first television announcement on New Year's Eve 1950 at 8 p.m. as part of NWDR's first experimental broadcasts; the number of viewers was presumably three. When the regular programme began broadcasting on 25 December 1952, she also hosted the show. In an audience survey conducted at the beginning of 1953 on the most popular announcers, she was ahead of her colleague Angelika Feldmann and male colleagues such as Hugo Murero, Udo Langhoff and Jürgen Roland, some of whom were judged rather unfavourably by the audience. Initially she received a salary of 20 DM per day of announcing, later she was employed by NDR until 1962 and at the same time directed the television children's programme as an author and presenter. She also worked as a narrator for various record productions and wrote children's books such as Schnurzelpurz (1959). In 1961 and 1962, she received the Silver Bravo Otto from the youth magazine Bravo.

Irene Koss had been married to the sports reporter and director Sammy Drechsel since 1962 and lived in Munich after her marriage. She and her husband had two daughters together. After Drechsel's death in 1986, she worked behind the scenes at the Lach- und Schießgesellschaft he founded and built up the cabaret's archive.

She died on 1 May 1996 in Munich, as a result of cancer. The couple's common grave is located at the Münchner Nordfriedhof (grave wall right no. 244).

== Literature ==
- Margret Baumann: Das Lächeln der Nation. Irene Koss, the first female television announcer. In: Das Archiv, 58th year 2010, No. 2.
- Rolf Potthoff: Who was it? Irene Koss. In: Westdeutsche Allgemeine Zeitung, 1. March 2014.
