= Felix von Jascheroff =

German actor

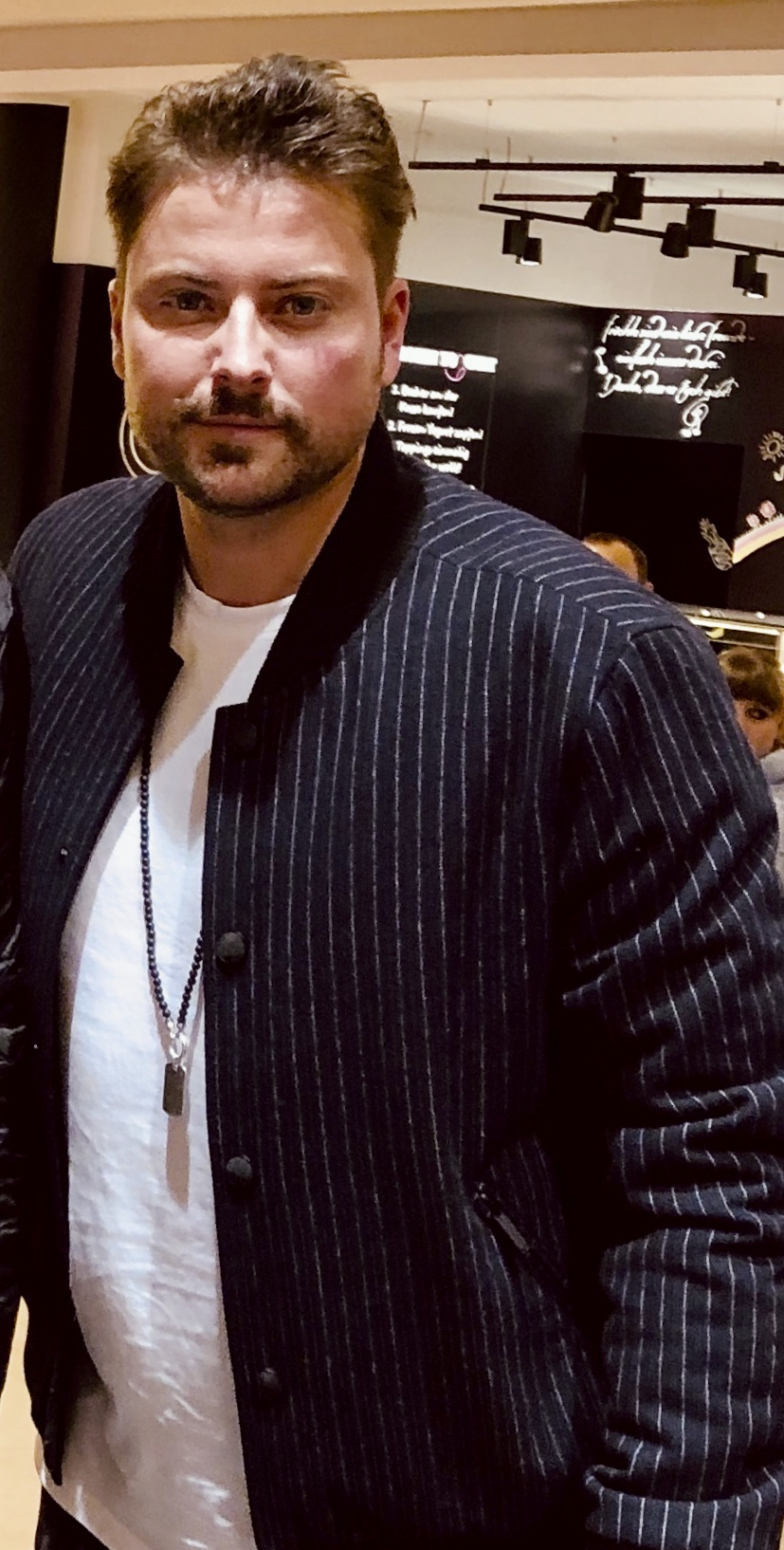
Felix von Jascheroff in 2019

Felix von Jascheroff (born 29 August 1982) is a German actor and singer, best known for his role as John Bachmann in the German soap opera Gute Zeiten, schlechte Zeiten.

== Personal life ==
Felix von Jascheroff comes from a family of actors. Born in 1982 in East Berlin to actress Juna-Maria von Jascheroff. His maternal grandparents are actor Hasso Zorn and actress-singer Jessy Rameik. His younger half-brother, Constantin von Jascheroff, is a known actor and voice actor as well.

In 2007, he married longtime-girlfriend Franziska Dilger, a fellow actress, who he met on the set of Gute Zeiten, schlechte Zeiten. The couple separated and eventually divorced in 2009. They share a daughter together, who was born in 2005.

Jascheroff started dating model Lisa Steiner. They share a son (*2012). The couple infamously broke up after appearing together on the dance competition Stepping Out in 2015.

Back in April 2013, Felix and his brother Constantin were accused of assault and were sentenced to pay 8000 Euro.

In 2016, Felix von Jascheroff started dating Bianca Bos. The following year, the couple got married. In March 2020, Jascheroff announced that he and his wife are separated.

== Career ==
=== Acting ===
Jascheroff got his start as an actor at eighteen years old, getting the contract role of John Bachmann in the popular German soap opera Gute Zeiten, schlechte Zeiten in 2001. Jascheroff played the role for almost thirteen years, leaving at the end of 2013; making his last appearance on-screen in February 2014. Jascheroff returned after twelve months, reappearing on-screen in February 2015. His role as John Bachmann has become an important character to the show's history, tackling issues like gang violence, incest, fraud and being involved in various love triangles; making Jascheroff a fan favorite.

In 2015, he and his then-girlfriend were part of the dance competition Stepping Out and in 2017, Jascheroff was part of the celebrity baking competition Das große Promi-Backen.

He had guest appearances on TV shows like Alarm für Cobra 11, Schloss Einstein and SOKO München.

=== Music ===
Jascheroff released his first single "Und jetzt kommst du" in 2003, with his first and only studio album, "Über...Leben", following in 2004. In 2019, Jascheroff released his first music after fifteen years, with the single "Rise Again", followed by "Melody" and in 2020 "Danke für nichts".

== Awards ==
- 2001: Bravo Otto in silver in category TV star male
- 2002: Bravo Otto in silver in category TV star male
- 2003: Bravo Otto in gold in category TV star male
- 2005: Bravo Otto in silver in category TV star male
