= Not My Day =

- Theatrical release poster
- Directed by: Peter Thorwarth
- Produced by: Marchus Machura; Christian Becker
- Starring: Moritz Bleibtreu; Axel Stein
- Cinematography: Jan Fehse
- Music by: Cowboys on Dope; Donar
- Production companies: Deutsche Columbia Pictures Filmproduktion; Westside Filmproduktion; Donar Film; Mr. Brown Entertainment
- Distributed by: Sony Pictures Releasing GmbH
- Release date: 16 January 2014
- Running time: 110 minutes
- Country: Germany
- Language: German
- Box office: $7.1 million

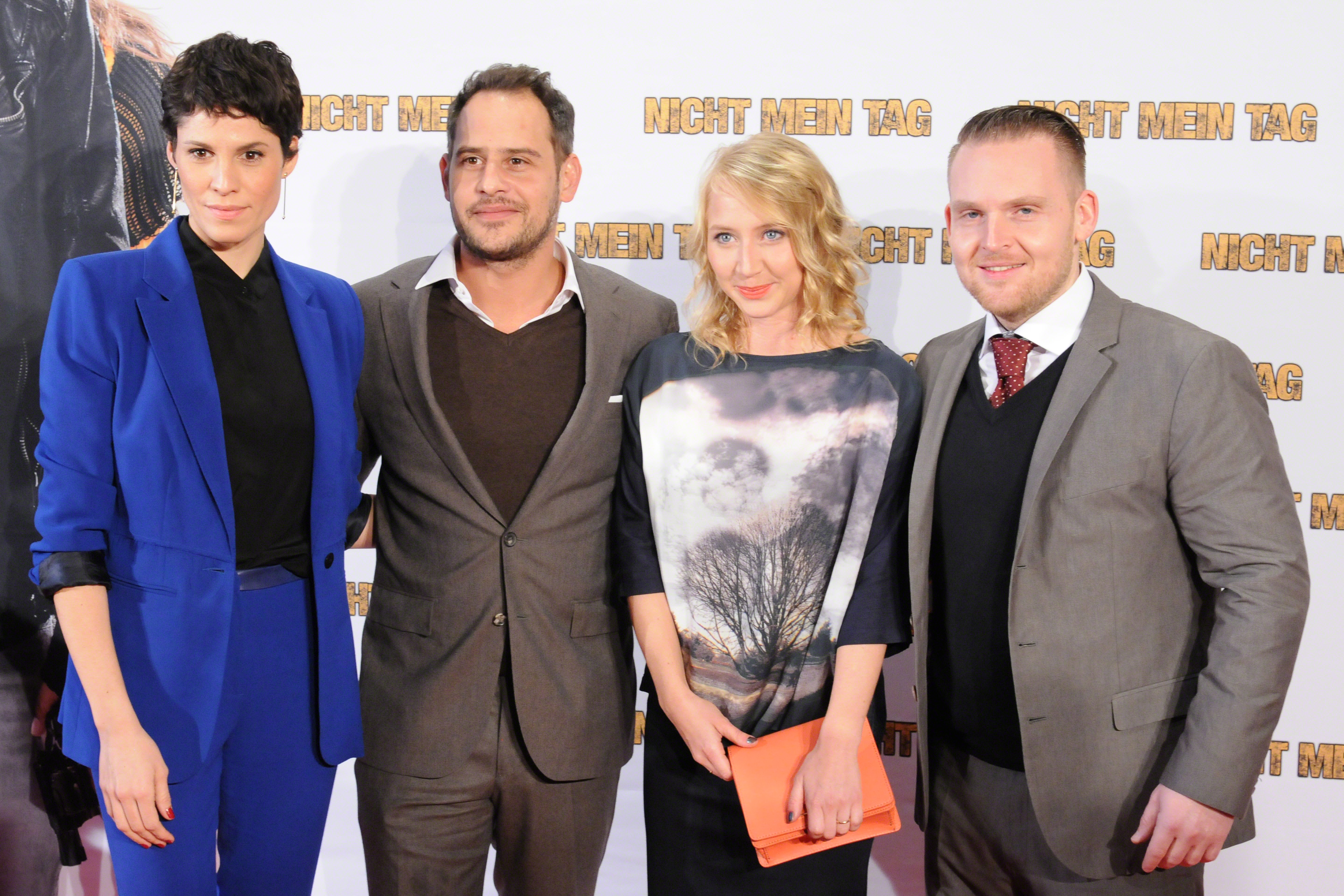
Jasmin Gerat, Moritz Bleibtreu, Anna Maria Mühe and Axel Stein (l.t.r.) at the world premiere of "Nicht mein Tag" in Bochum, January 12, 2014

Not My Day (German: Nicht mein Tag) is a 2014 German action film based on the eponymous novel by Ralf Husmann.

== Plot ==
Till Reiners, once a rock musician, is frustrated about his monotonous life. He works as a bank clerk and is married to Miriam. The petty criminal Nappo tries to apply for credit in the bank for the purchase of an old Ford Mustang, which is denied him by Reiners but lack of collateral. The next day Nappo attacks the bank in a Mr. T costume and is abandoned by his escape car driver. He wants to first take a colleague of Reiners as a hostage but interferes, so Nappo finally takes Reiners as a hostage and flees with his car in front of the approaching police.

On the run they get to an accident site, Nappo takes off his mask so as not to attract attention from the police securing the accident. Later they both wait for the next day in a remote cabin, they talk to each other, Till talks about his son, Nappo encourages him to sing, and they discover that they both like the same music. The next morning, Nappo takes his hostage with him to buy a car from the criminal junkyard owner Langer. There he buys the Ford Mustang, Till helps him down the price and Nappo releases Till shortly thereafter. Till arrives back home, a naked man in the marriage bed and mistakenly thinks that his wife Miriam has cheated on him. Completely desperate he runs out of the house and meets there on Nappo. He has received an order from the junkyard owner Langer for the purchase of stolen securities from Albanians in Amsterdam and needs Tills help. They take Nappo's girlfriend Nadine with them and set off for Holland together. On the way Till is recognized at a gas station by a clerk as a wanted hostage victim, but Till shows the man an arrogant Porsche driver as a hostage-taker, because he had approached him shortly before at the petrol station area. The gas station employee then beats the Porsche driver together and Till flees on with Nappo and Nadine. The incident recorded by gas station surveillance cameras leads the police to assume that Till Nappo is an accomplice.

After the deal with the Albanians in Amsterdam, the situation escalates: Till, who does not tolerate alcohol and has to bump into the business with vodka, freaks out completely, it comes to a brawl, without Nappo's knowledge he takes the Albanians from the money again. In Amsterdam, all three experience a wild night, Till separates later from the other two, attends a concert of his favorite band Donar and is filmed there during the stagediving for a livestream, his wife Miriam sees him at home randomly in this stream. At the end of the night, the rest of the Albanian money burns in a police car stolen by Till.

Miriam, who had learned of the original hostage-taking late, set off for the Netherlands to fight for her husband. After the Albanians abduct them to squeeze their money back, Nappo helps his new buddy, who has desperately raided a bank to regain the money, and free Miriam in a showdown. Till is shot when leaving the bank and severely injured arrested, the further-fledged Nappo but later relieved him of a video so far that Till has to serve only a short prison sentence and soon return to his family.

== Cast ==
- Moritz Bleibtreu as Nappo
- Axel Stein as Till
- Jasmin Gerat as Nadine
- Anna Maria Mühe as Miriam
- Nele Kiper as Ina
