= Kai Böcking =

German television presenter

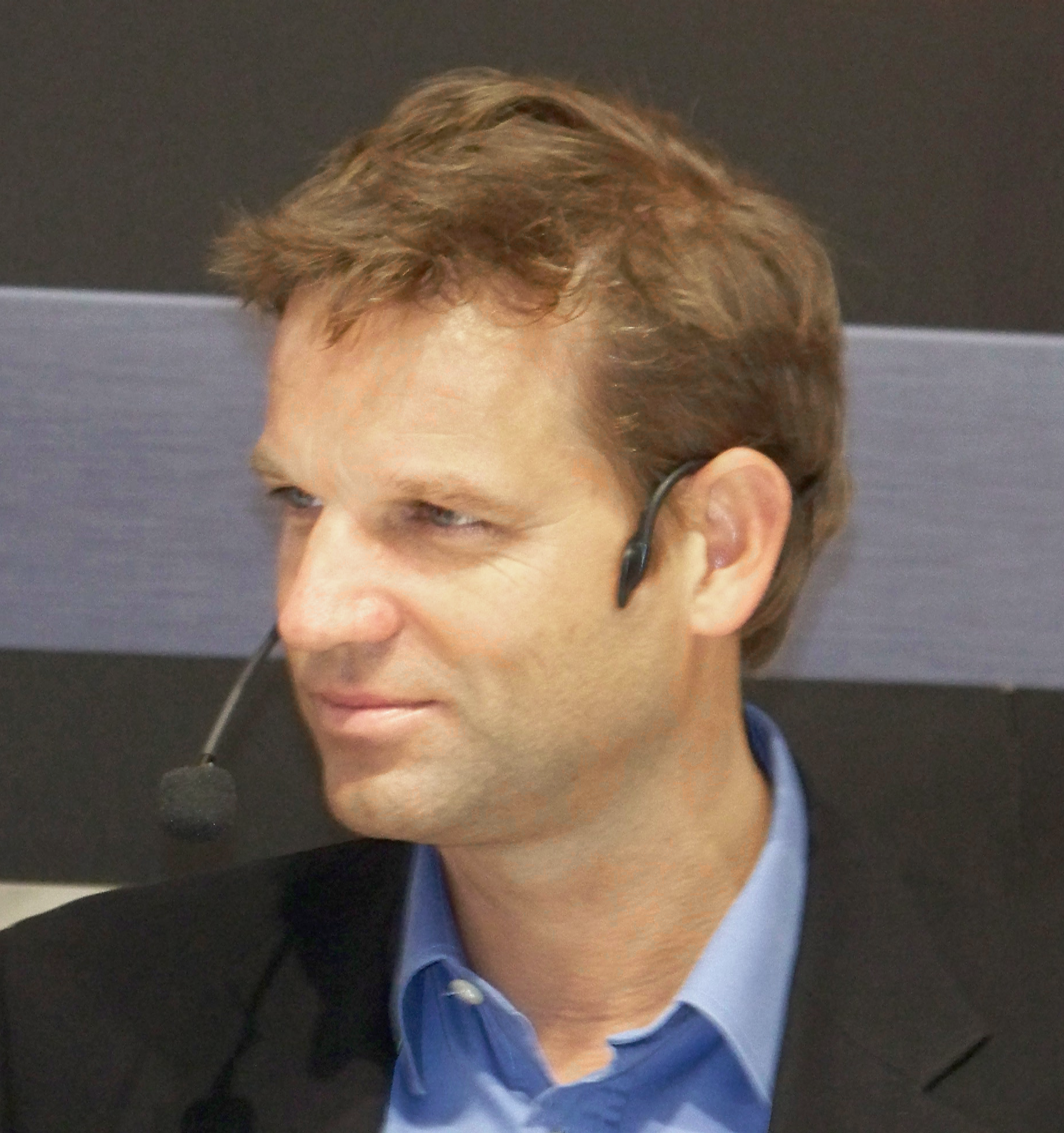
- Böcking in 2008
- Born: Kai Böcking; 3 August 1964 (age 60); Neuss, West Germany
- Occupation: Television presenter

Kai Böcking (born 3 August 1964) is a German television presenter.

== Life ==
Böcking works as television presenter on German television.

== Television ==
- 1989–1992 Rias TV
- 1988–1990: Formel Eins
- 1991–1992: Kai Life, WDR
- 1993: Heiter bis ulkig, Dritte Programme
- 1994: Dollar, WDR, HR, MDR
- 1995: Die Ersten, Das Erste
- 1995: Holidate, ZDF
- 1996: Fernsehgarten
- 1996–1999: Jetzt kannst Du was erleben, ZDF
- 1998–2002: Risiko!
- Auge um Auge, ZDF
- NRW Champion, WDR
- 2003: Die Deutsche Stimme 2003, ZDF
- 2004–2005: Best of Formel Eins, kabel eins
- 2007: Kochstars – Die Herausforderer, tv.gusto
- 2008: Deutschland kocht!, tv.gusto
- TV Total Turmspringen
