= Ben (German singer) =

German singer

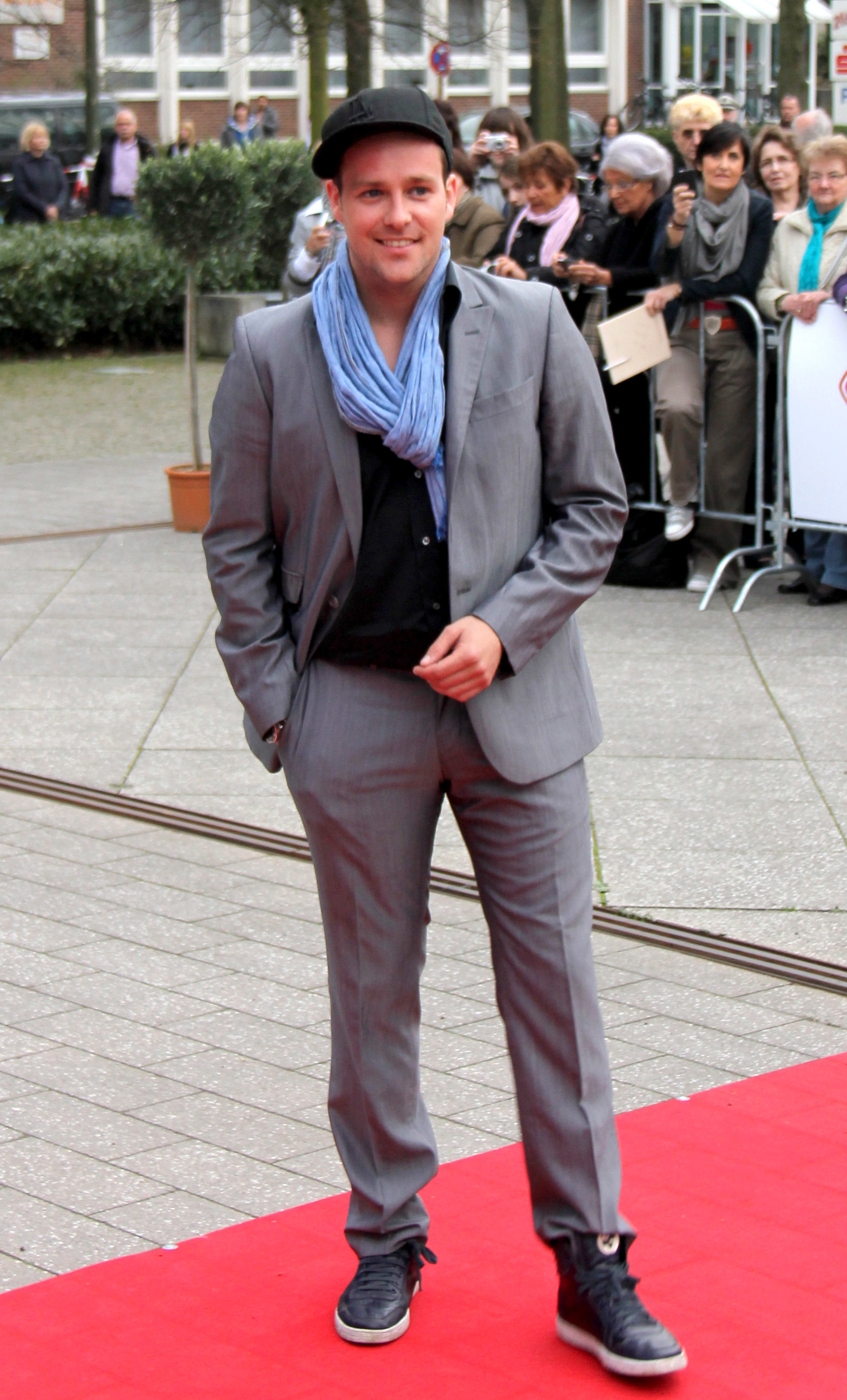
- Ben during the Grimme Awards 2011

Background information
- Born: Bernhard Albrecht Matthias Lasse Blümel; 15 May 1981 (age 45)
- Origin: Berlin, Germany
- Genres: Pop
- Occupation: Singer
- Years active: 2002–present

Ben (born Bernhard Albrecht Matthias Lasse Blümel on 15 May 1981 in Berlin) is a German singer and TV host.

His greatest success was 2002 with the hit single "Engel", a collaboration with singer Gim. He was also successful as TV presenter of the music show The Dome (RTL II), Toggo Music (Super RTL) and Bravo TV (Pro 7).

He was the narrator in the German version of the 2006 Canadian-French animal film The White Planet.

== Discography ==
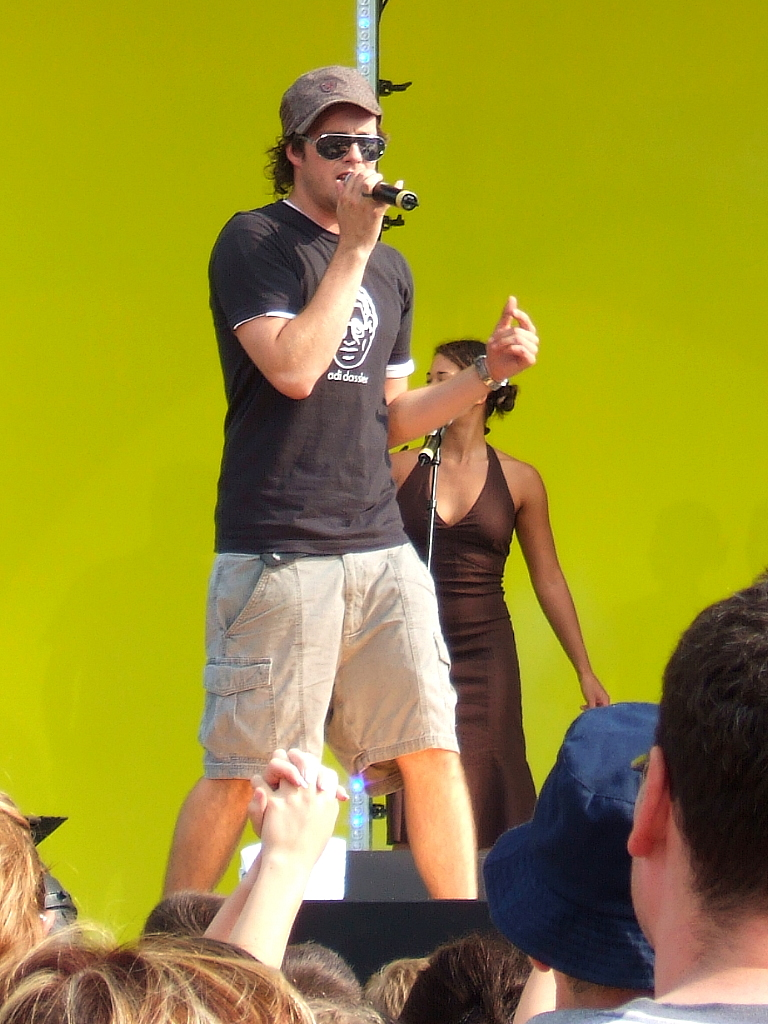
Ben performing in 2006

=== Albums ===
- Hörproben (2002)
- Leben leben (2003)

=== Singles ===
- 2002 – "Engel" (featuring Gim)
- 2002 – "Herz aus Glas"
- 2002 – "Gesegnet seist du"
- 2003 – "Wunder geschehn" (Nena & Friends)
- 2003 – "Kleider machen Leute"
- 2003 – "Verliebt"
- 2005 – "Manchmal"
- 2006 – "Vorbei" (with U96)
- 2007 – "Bedingungslos / Einmalig" (with Kate Hall)
- 2007 – "Du bist wie Musik" (with Kate Hall)
- 2007 – "Ich lieb' dich immer noch so sehr" (with Kate Hall)
- 2008 – "2 Herzen" (with Kate Hall)

=== DVDs ===
- 2002 – Gesegnet seist Du (DVD single)
- 2003 – Hörproben live (DVD video)

== Awards ==
- 2002 – Bravo Otto in Silver, Category Singer
- 2003 – Die Goldene Stimmgabel
- 2005 – Bravo Otto in Bronce, Category Best TV Star (male)
