= Lou van Burg =

Dutch-born entertainer

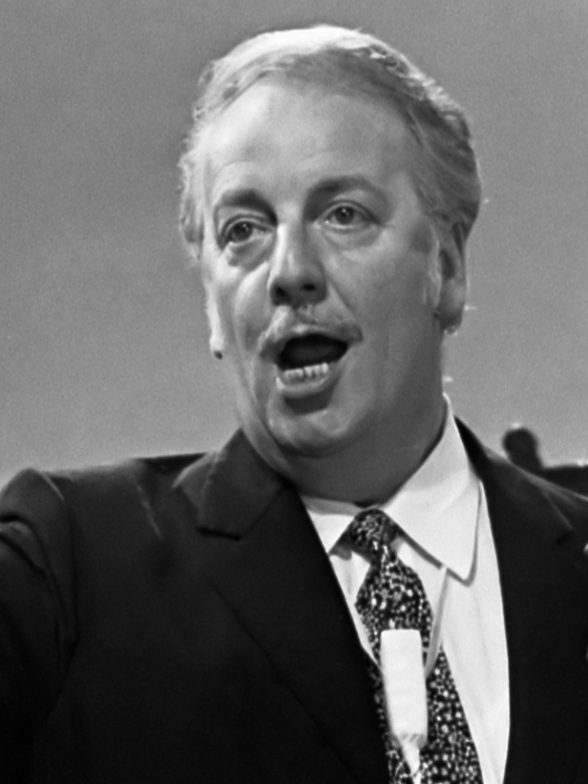
- Lou van Burg (1968)
- Born: Louis van Weerdenburg; 25 August 1917; The Hague, Netherlands
- Died: 26 April 1986 (aged 68); Munich, West Germany
- Other names: Loetje van Weerdenburg; Onkel Lou; Mister Wunnebar
- Occupation: Entertainer

Lou van Burg (born Louis van Weerdenburg) (25 August 1917 – 26 April 1986) was a Dutchman who had a successful career as a television personality, singer and game show host in Germany.

== Biography ==
Born in The Hague, van Burg began his career as a singer and conferencier in Paris cabarets. He first appeared as a TV entertainer on the Austrian ORF broadcaster in 1958 and shortly afterwards also on German ARD.

When the second German television broadcaster ZDF was launched in 1963, van Burg in the following year became the host of Der goldene Schuss, a game show that quickly reached an immense popularity. Referring to Schiller's Wilhelm Tell, in an early example of an interactive game the contestants, supported by viewers via telephone, had to true up the bolt of a crossbow trying to hit the bullseye on a displayed target. The ritual, accompanied by van Burg's catchphrases ("Wunnebar"), became a TV classic. On 25 August 1966 the show was even broadcast from the Monte Carlo Casino starring Grace Kelly and in 1967 it was adopted by the British ITV network (The Golden Shot). In the same year however, van Burg had to hand off the show after the yellow press had spread rumours about his private life.

In 1975 he acted in Rosa von Praunheim's film Berliner Bettwurst, which brought him back into business in 1976, again hosting several game shows on TV. From 1979 he also worked with Frank Elstner as a radio host on the German service of Radio Luxemburg.

Lou van Burg died in Munich, aged 68.

== Literature ==
- Lou van Weerdenburg: Lou van Burg erzählt: Aus dem Leben eines Fernsehstars. Kranich-Verlag: Berlin-Zehlendorf 1961
