= Juliane Werding =

German singer

Juliane Werding (born 19 July 1956 in Essen) is a German singer and alternative therapy practitioner (Heilpraktiker).

Her recordings include "Am Tag, als Conny Kramer starb" (1972) and "Nacht voll Schatten" (1983) (German cover of Mike Oldfield's "Moonlight Shadow") which peaked at #13 in Germany. "Am Tag, als Conny Kramer starb" is the tune of the American song "The Night They Drove Old Dixie Down" by The Band with new lyrics about a different subject. This was her sole #1 in Germany (1972). In 1975 she scored her second biggest hit, reaching #4 with Wenn du denkst du denkst dann denkst du nur du denkst. Werding racked up 23 single and 19 album entries on the German chart between 1972 and 1995. Her biggest album being 1987's Jenseits der Nacht which peaked at #8.

Werding wrote several books and lives in Starnberg near Munich, where she works in alternative therapy. She has two children. In 2009, she quit show business to focus on working as a Heilpraktiker.

== Discography ==
- In tiefer Trauer (1972)
- Mein Name ist Juliane (1973)
- Wenn du denkst, du denkst, dann denkst du nur, du denkst (1975)
- ... ein Schritt weiter (1976)
- Oh Mann, oh Mann (1977)
- Traumland (1982)
- Ohne Angst (1984)
- Sehnsucht ist unheilbar (1986)
- Stimmen im Wind (1986)
- Jenseits der Nacht (1987)
- Tarot (1988)
- Zeit für Engel (1990)
- Zeit nach Avalon zu geh'n (1991)
- Sie weiß was sie will (1992)
- Du schaffst es! (1994)
- Alles okay? (1995)
- Land der langsamen Zeit (1997)
- Sie (1998)
- Es gibt kein zurück (2000)
- Die Welt danach (2004)
- Sehnsucher (2006)
- Ruhe vor dem Sturm (2008)

== Publications ==
- Sagen Sie mal, Herr Jesus... (2001)
- Sehnsucher. 7 Wege, mit der Sehnsucht zu leben (2006)
- Huren, Heuchler, Heilige (2007)

== Awards ==
- Goldene Europa: 1972
- Goldene Stimmgabel: 1985, 1987, 1991, 1993, 1998
