= Jasmin Gerat =

German actress (born 1978)

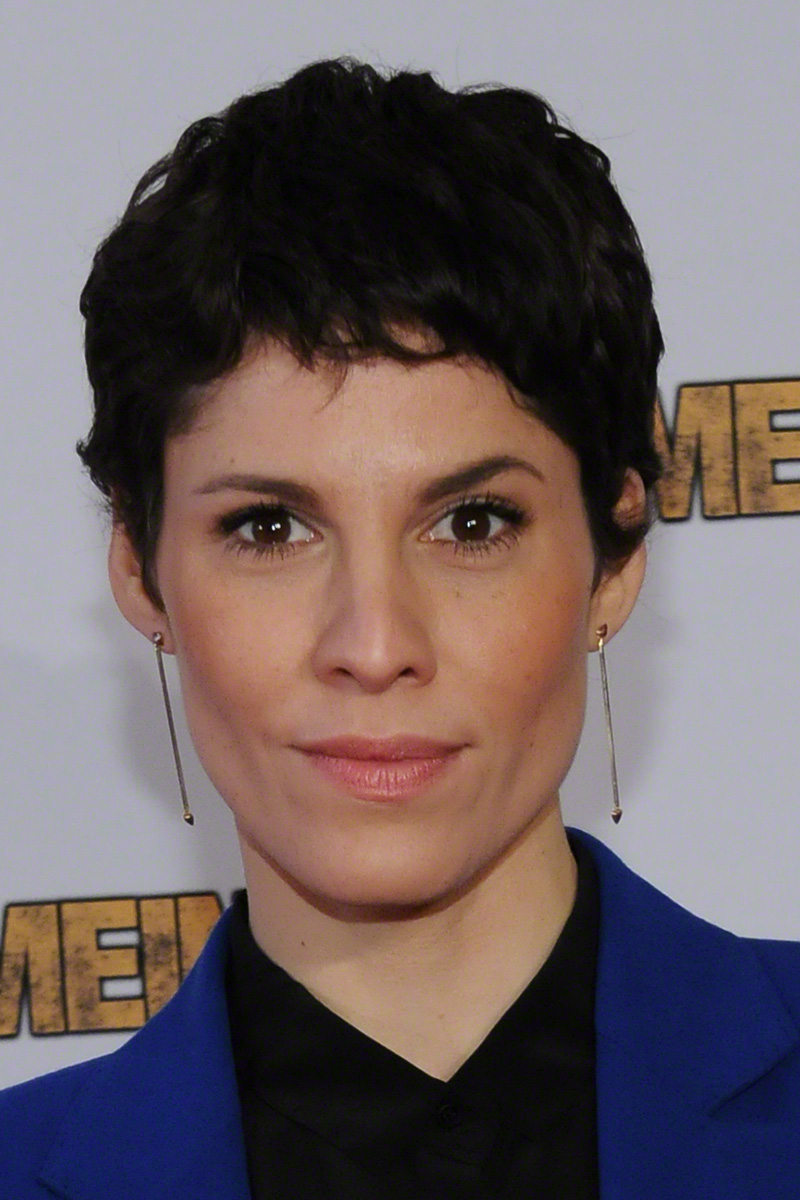
- Born: 25 December 1978 (age 47); West Berlin, West Germany
- Occupation: Actress
- Years active: 1997–present

Jasmin Gerat (born 25 December 1978 in West Berlin) is a German actress.

Gerat is the daughter of a Turkish father and a German mother. In 1994 she won the Bravo-Girl competition. The next year, she placed second in The Look of the Year competition for models. In the mid-nineties, she began working in German television, hosting Heart Attack, Bravo TV and Chartbreaker.

Gerat began working as an actress in 1997, her first major role being a lead in Caipiranha by Felix Dünnemann. In addition to film and television roles, Gerat has performed on stage, in Düsseldorf and Hanover.

Beginning in 2005, she has played the police detective Jale Beck on the crime series Cologne P.D., a role she helped develop. Beck is, like Gerat, half-Turkish, half-German.

== Filmography ==
- First Love – Die große Liebe (1997)
- SK-Babies – Partyline (1998)
- Küstenwache (2000–2005)
- Ein Scheusal zum Verlieben (2000)
- I Love You, Baby (2000)
- Marokko und der beste Mensch der Welt (2001)
- SK Kölsch – Die letzte Runde (2002)
- Der Bulle von Tölz – Strahlende Schönheit (2003)
- Cologne P.D. (2003)
- Zwischen Liebe und Tod (2004)
- Nachtschicht – Vatertag (2004)
- Mädchen, Mädchen 2 – Loft oder Liebe (Girls on Top 2) (2004)
- Die Mandantin (2005)
- Alarm für Cobra 11 – Lauras Entscheidung (2006)
- Erased (2006)
- Rabbit Without Ears 2 (2009)
- Kokowääh (2011)
- Men Do What They Can (2012)
- Kokowääh 2 (2013)
- Nicht mein Tag (2014)
- The Team (2015)
- The Last Trace (2016)
