= Men Do What They Can =

- Theatrical release poster
- Directed by: Marc Rothemund
- Screenplay by: Hans Rath; Marc Rothemund
- Produced by: Alexander Thies; Stefan Thies
- Starring: Wotan Wilke Möhring; Jan Josef Liefers; Jasmin Gerat
- Cinematography: Martin Langer
- Edited by: Dirk Grau
- Music by: Peter Hinderthür
- Production companies: NFP Neue Film Produktion; Warner Bros. Film Productions Germany
- Distributed by: Warner Bros. Pictures
- Release date: 11 October 2012
- Running time: 107 minutes
- Country: Germany
- Language: German
- Box office: $7,304,731

Men Do What They Can (German: Mann tut was Mann kann) is a 2012 German movie directed by Marc Rothemund.

With 746,017 admissions it was the sixth most successful film in Germany in 2012.

== Plot ==
Paul Schuberth is in his early forties, an HR manager at a Berlin publishing house, and believes he is quite content with his life as a single man. Divorced from Lisa, he has a casual affair with Kathrin. To share his life temporarily with someone who makes no demands on him, Paul volunteers to look after shelter dogs. His first outing with Fred, a boisterous and aggressive Rottweiler cross, causes a stir not only at the duck pond in the city park but also leads to his meeting Iris Jasper, a veterinarian, with whom Paul instantly falls in love. When Paul spontaneously invites Iris to dinner, she declines, as she is about to marry her boyfriend Timothy.

Paul's best friend, computer nerd Günther, and his publishing colleague, sales manager Guido Schamski, are also having trouble in their love lives. Womanizer Guido was kicked out by his wife after she found out about his affair with Katja, the secretary of the publishing house's boss, Dr. Görges. So Guido moves in with Paul, bringing his piano and Porsche with him. The shy Günther has never dared to even speak to his crush, Iggy. One day, in a fit of romantic passion, he gives up his own apartment and tries to move in with Iggy. When she refuses, Günther also ends up at Paul's place. The men's shared apartment is completed by Bronko Steiner, whom Paul hires as a chauffeur after losing his driver’s license for drunk driving. Bronko is a moderately talented painter who spent all his money on an art exhibition and thus no longer has a place of his own.

Paul tries to help his friends, and during their gatherings around Paul's kitchen table, neither red wine nor words of wisdom are in short supply. Torn between choosing his wife or Katja, Guido meets Paul's ex-wife Lisa and realizes she is the woman of his dreams. Günther, still tongue-tied around Iggy, is nevertheless "heard" by her thanks to the support of his friends. Meanwhile, Paul has broken up with Kathrin and has a one-night stand with Kathrin's friend Biggi, who hopes it will help her clarify her feelings for her boyfriend Rodriguez. Paul also adopts Fred from the shelter.

Iris, who feels strongly drawn to Paul and doubts whether Timothy is the right man for her, finally accepts Paul's invitation to dinner. They spend a long, intimate evening at the restaurant. When Iris then offers to sleep with him as one time only offer, but Paul declines. The next day, he realizes just how much he loves Iris, but it seems too late. Iris tells him she will marry Timothy the next day. On the day of the wedding, Paul impulsively races toward the village where the wedding party is gathered in a castle garden, using Guido's Porsche. Just before he arrives, he runs out of gas and has to cover the last stretch on foot, wading through a stream and arriving completely soaked. Without an invitation and dripping wet, Paul is denied entry to the wedding. Dr. Görges, who surprisingly appears with Katja as a wedding guest, offers no help. However, Paul learns from him that Iris is not only a veterinarian but also the heiress to a publishing fortune.

Guido, Günther, and Bronko do not abandon Paul. When the three arrive shortly afterward with Fred, Paul is able, with their help, to climb over the garden wall and declare his love to Iris, causing the wedding to be called off at the last moment.

In the final scene, Bronko and Iris's best friend Andrea grow closer, and Fred is delighted by the appearance of a lady dog.

== Cast ==
- Wotan Wilke Möhring: Paul Schuberth
- Jasmin Gerat: Iris Jasper
- Jan Josef Liefers: Guido Schamski
- Fahri Ögün Yardim: Bronko Steiner
- Oliver Korittke: Günther
- Karoline Schuch: Iggy
- Friederike Kempter: Kathrin
- Anne Weinknecht: Andrea
- Tobias Oertel: Timothy Huntington
- Hedi Kriegeskotte: Frau Hoffmann
- Peter Sattmann: Dr. Görges
- Noémi Besedes: Katja Riebinger
- Miranda Leonhardt: Biggi
- Manuel Cortez: Rodriguez
- Emilia Schüle: Sophie
