= Die Wicherts von nebenan =

- Starring: Maria Sebaldt
- Country of origin: Germany

Die Wicherts von nebenan is a German television series that aired 1986–1991.

== Cast ==
Main

- Stephan Orlac – Eberhard Wichert
- Maria Sebaldt – Hannelore Wichert
- Jochen Schroeder – Rüdiger Wichert
- Hendrik Martz –Andreas Wichert
- Edith Schollwer – Käthe Wichert
- Ekkehard Fritsch – Walter Pinnow
- Anja Schüte – Uschi (Ulrike) von Strelenau

Supporting

- Sophie Birkner – Katharina Wichert
- Oliver Lausberg – Sebastian Wichert
- Gisela Peltzer – Gräfin von Strelenau (née Schmidt)
- Friedrich Schütter – Hasso Graf von Strelenau
- Karin Hardt – Cäcilie Gräfin von Strelenau
- Stefan Gossler – Jürgen Reuter
- Roswitha Schreiner – Gaby Wegener
- Juliane Rautenberg – Elke Wichert (née Dreher)
- Siegfried Grönig – Georg Meisel
- Gerhard Friedrich – Bernhard Tenstaag
- Mady Rahl – Sophie Tenstaag
- Gudrun Genest – Ilse Glaubrecht
- Brigitte Mira – Conny Hartleb
- Andreas Mannkopff – Heinz Heinz
- Andreas Fröhlich – Martin
- Manfred Lehmann – Kuttlick
- Christel Harthaus – Helga Kuttlick
- Inge Wolffberg – Gerda Kusnewski
- Karl Schönböck – Dr. Dr. Gürtler
- Horst Pinnow – Alwin Barthold
- Peter Matić – Monsieur Pierre
- Wilfried Herbst – Ober Philipp bei Monsieur Pierre
- Marlies Engel – Friede Langhans-Schüchtermann
- Wolfgang Bathke – Lothar Kneisel, bank authorized representative
- Friedrich Schoenfelder – Dr. Helmer, Chairman of the Board of Möbel Union
- Claudio Maniscalco – Stefan, Andreas's friend
- Gerhard Wollner – Krause, doorman of the Möbel Union and singing brother of the Harmonie
- Christian Rode – Olaf Köntgen
- Gaby Gasser – Sabine Lallinger
- Ursula Buchfellner – Sylvie, Rüdiger's secretary

== See also ==
- List of German television series
