= Marlon Knauer =

German singer

Marlon Knauer (born August 19, 1987 in East Berlin) is a German singer, identified on album covers, concert advertisements, and other media only by his first name.

At the age of 14, he was "discovered" by Rolf Brendel, formerly the drummer for Nena. In 2002, his second single, "Lieber Gott", made in collaboration with Peter Maffay, Nena, Udo Lindenberg, Herbert Dreilich, Joachim Witt and Rolf Stahlhofen, was a breakthrough, reaching No.6 on the German charts. Revenue from the song was used to help victims of the 2002 European floods. In the same year his first album, Hallo Liebes Leben, was released. In January 2006, his single, "Was immer du willst", appeared, and on February 9, 2006 it came in sixth in the Bundesvision Song Contest.

== Discography ==
=== Albums ===
- 2002: Hallo Liebes Leben (Hello, dear life)
- 2006: Herzschlag (Heartbeat)

=== Singles ===
- 2002: Ich hab' dich zuerst gesehen (I saw you first)
- 2002: Lieber Gott (Benefiz-CD) (Dear God)
- 2003: Fragen Fragen Fragen (Questions Questions Questions)
- 2006: Was immer du willst (Whatever you want)
- 2006: Deine Liebe fehlt (Your Love is missing)
