= Patrik Pacard =

- Created by: Bernd Burgemeister; Gero Erhardt (Producer)
- Starring: Hendrik Martz; Peter Bongartz; Gila von Weitershausen; Wolfgang Kieling; Knut Hinz; Jean-Claude Bouillon; Agnes Dünneisen; Jan Biczycki; Sabi Dorr; Reinhard Glemnitz; Andreas Mannkopff; Andreas Seyferth; Karl-Heinz Vosgerau; Charles M. Huber; Jeanette Mühlmann; Pierre Clémenti; Ivo Vrzal-Wiegand; Christian Wolff
- Countries of origin: Germany; Austria; Switzerland
- No. of episodes: 6 (Germany); 12 (Switzerland)

Production
- Running time: 45 Minutes

Original release
- Network: ZDF (Germany); TV DRS (Switzerland)
- Release: 25 December 1984 – 29 January 1985

Patrik Pacard is the sixth ZDF-Weihnachtsserie (English: Christmas Series), and aired in 1984. The series was broadcast in Germany on ZDF, and consisted of 6 episodes. Broadcasting in Germany began on 25 December 1984. The series was also broadcast in Switzerland, and consisted of 12 episodes. Broadcasting in Switzerland began on 4 December 1984.

An English-language version of this series was shown by the BBC in the United Kingdom in 1992, and repeated in 1995, though with a revised plot to reflect the end of the Cold War. A French-language version of this series was broadcast as well.

The shows titular character and theme song are incorporated in an Internet meme on YTMND in relation to an alter-ego of Star Trek's Jean-Luc Picard, who was played by Patrick Stewart.

== Story ==
The story is about a German boy and his family getting into an espionage story whilst on holiday in Norway.

== Media ==
- Patrik Pacard, 2 DVD, Universum Film, ZDF-Video - 82876 63152 9
- Soundtrack
