= Die Unverbesserlichen =

- Created by: Robert Stromberger
- Starring: Inge Meysel; Joseph Offenbach; Agnes Windeck; Gernot Endemann; Monika Peitsch; Helga Anders; Gerda Gmelin
- Country of origin: West Germany
- No. of episodes: 7

Original release
- Network: ARD
- Release: 9 May 1965 – 9 May 1971

Die Unverbesserlichen is a German television series. Seven episodes aired between 1965 and 1971, one per year usually on or around Mother's Day.

== See also ==
- List of German television series
