= Hendrik Martz =

German actor (born 1968)

Hendrik Martz (born 9 May 1968 in Hamburg) is a German actor.

== Life ==
Martz works as actor on German television.

== Filmography ==
- 1984: Patrik Pacard - role: Patrik Pacard
- 1986–1990: Die Wicherts von nebenan - role: Andy Wichert
- 1987: Großstadtrevier (two times)
- 1987: Der Landarzt - role: Eike Matthiesen
- 1989: Tatort (episode Kopflos)
- 1994: Elbflorenz
- 1995: Gegen den Wind - role: Tjard
- 1995: Dr. Stefan Frank
- 1996: SK-Babies
- 1998–2000: Verbotene Liebe
- 1999: Der Landarzt - role: Eike Matthiesen
- 1999: Die Wache
- 2003: Unser Charly
- 2004: Alphateam
- 2007: Der Goldene Nazivampir von Absam 2 – Das Geheimnis von Schloß Kottlitz
- 2010: Kaiserschmarrn
- 2012: Nord Nord Mord
