= Christian Wunderlich =

German actor, singer and songwriter

- Wunderlich in 2026
- Born: 12 July 1979 (age 47); Cologne, Germany
- Occupations: Musician; singer; songwriter; actor; author
- Years active: 1998–2012
- Musical career
- Genres: Pop; acoustic; Teen pop
- Instruments: Vocals; piano; guitar
- Labels: Sony; EMI

Christian Wunderlich (born 12 July 1979 in Cologne) is a German actor, singer and songwriter. He is best known for a global hit ballad single "So in love" in 1999. "Real Good Moments", his debut album released on 6 September 1999, made him famous not only in Germany, but also worldwide, especially in Switzerland. In 2001, he became a support act on some of 2001 "Where Dreams Come True Tour" by Irish pop vocal band Westlife. In 2009 he released his single: “Gelacht, um nicht zu weinen”. He released three albums during his career, the last one in German. He lives with his family in Germany and has written some books for children.

== Life and career ==
Wunderlich was the youngest child of Renate and Claus Wunderlich, after twins Stephanie and Alexandra. Wunderlich's father died of a brain tumor in 1993.

In 1995, after seeing a job advertisement in a Cologne newspaper, Wunderlich applied to the daily soap opera "Verbotene Liebe" (Forbidden Love) and was cast in the role of Frank Levinsky. He quickly rose from a minor supporting role to become one of the main actors. In August 1998, Wunderlich's first single, "That's My Way to Say Goodbye," was released. This was followed by the singles "In Heaven" and "So in Love" - his most successful single to date. In June 1999, Wunderlich left "Verbotene Liebe."

In 1999, he was awarded two bronze Bravo Ottos for best television actor and singer. He also won the Popcorn Award for audience favorite in 1998.

Wunderlich's debut album Real Good Moments was released on September 6, 1999 and reached the top 20 of the charts in both Germany and Switzerland.

On January 11, 2000, the first episode of the ZDF television series "Die Nesthocker – Familie zu verschenken" (The Nestlings – Family for Sale), in which Wunderlich played the role of Oliver Brandt, was broadcast. The series' theme song was "Real Good Moments," which he wrote.

On November 27, 2000, Wunderlich released his second album, Reflections, which, however, did not replicate his previous success.

After two seasons, he left "Die Nesthocker" to tour Asia with the Irish band Westlife. He then withdrew from public life for a time. He came back into the public eye in 2006 when he played the humorous, slightly awkward air traffic controller Jochen "Klemmi" Klemm in the telenovela " Schmetterlinge im Bauch".

In the fall of 2009, Wunderlich announced his comeback as a singer on his website. On March 19, 2010, his new single "Gelacht, um nicht zu weinen" (Laughed to Not Cry) was released, a track from the album "Zwischen den Zeilen" (Between the Lines). In the meantime, he worked as an editor for the call-in talk show "Domian".

In 2016, Wunderlich made a comeback with the ZDF film License to Affair. His first children's book, Badger Nosewhite: Fantastic Stories from the Wondrous Forest, was published in 2023. Volume two was published the following year.

== Discography ==
=== Studio albums ===
- Real Good Moments (1999)
- Reflections (2000)
- Zwischen Den Zeilen (Between the Lines) (2010)

=== Singles ===
- That’s My Way To Say Goodbye (1998)
- In Heaven (1998)
- So in love (1999)
- Forever Tonight (1999)
- Why Goodbye (2000)

Other Singles

- 1999: Real Good Moments (I Wanna Thank You)
- 2010: Gelacht Um Nicht Zu Weinen

== Filmography ==
1995–1999: Forbidden Love – Role: Frank Levinsky

1997: Three Days Dead – Short Film

1998: SOKO 5113: Kalle's Children

1999: My Sister's Kiss

1999–2000: Nesthocker – Family for Sale – Role: Oliver Brandt

2002: Mother on the palm tree

2003: In the Name of the Law: Vanished Without a Trace

2006–2007: Butterflies in my stomach

2006/2007: Sparline – The Flight Empire Returns (co-director, screenwriter and lead role)

2011: Columbus (director, screenwriter and lead role)

2015: SOKO 5113: And then came Alf

2015: Betty's diagnosis: secrets - role: Harald Wiess

2016: Rosamunde Pilcher: License to Cheat – role: Sam Stanton

2016: Cruise into Happiness: Honeymoon to Lisbon – role: Florian Mahler

2018: Inga Lindström: Decision for Love – eole: Robert

2018: Einstein: Compression – dole: Andreas Schaat

2018: Lindenstraße guest role: Kevin Riedel

2019: SOKO Wismar: Death of a Hero – role: Ralph Tümmler

2019: The Plumber: Being Different Has Personality – role: Bernhard Wolters

2019: Family Dr. Kleist: Irresponsible – role: Niklas Hauptmann
