= So ist das Leben! Die Wagenfelds =

- Country of origin: Germany
- No. of episodes: 169 + pilot

Production
- Running time: 24 minutes

Original release
- Network: Sat. 1
- Release: October 1995 – February 1996

So ist das Leben! Die Wagenfelds is a German television series.

== See also ==
- List of German television series
