= Nova Meierhenrich =

German television presenter and actress (born 1973)

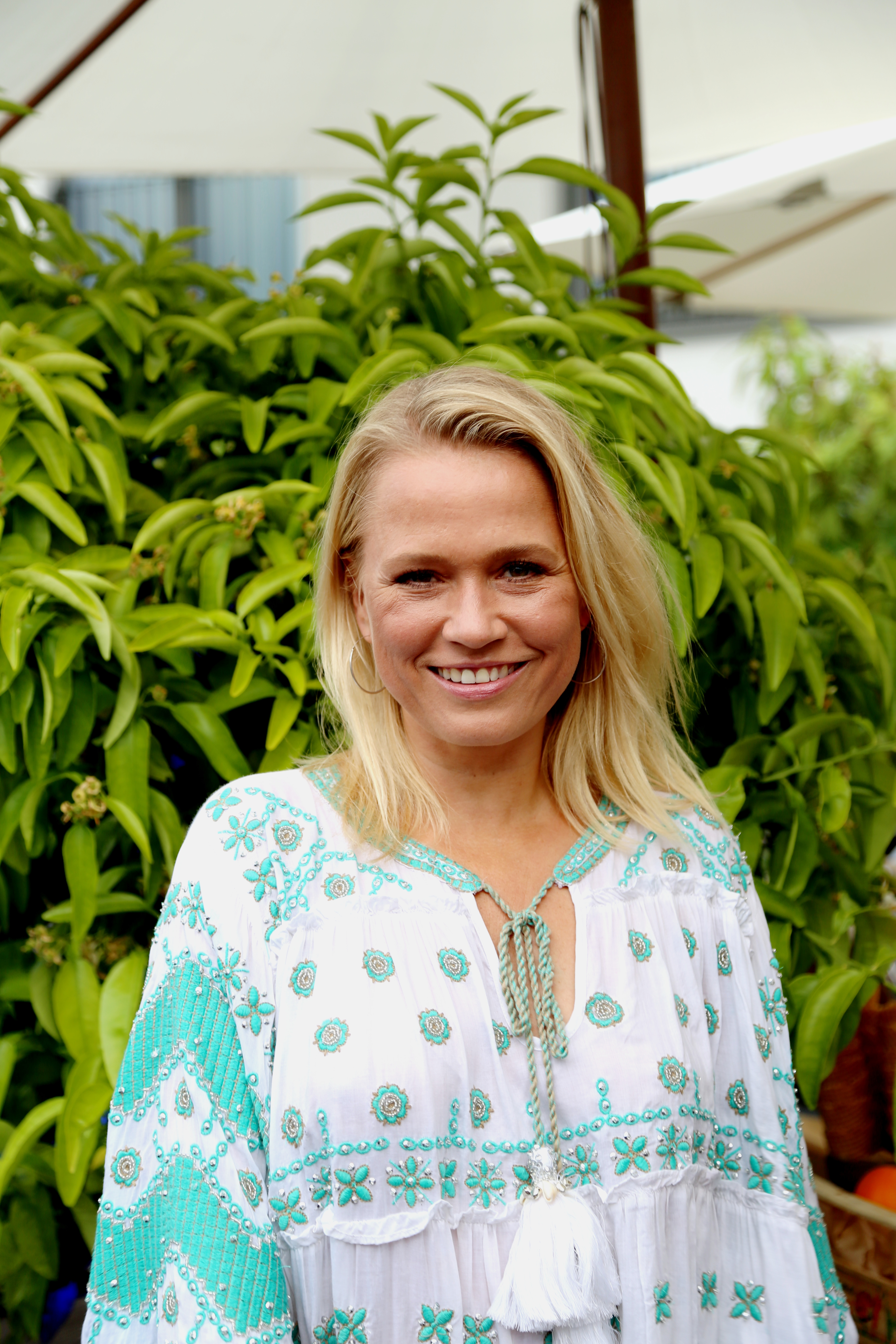
Nova Meierhenrich (2017)

Nova Meierhenrich (born 25 December 1973) is a German television presenter and actress.

Meierhenrich was born in Ahlen, North Rhine-Westphalia. She began her career as a TV presenter on German TV in 1996 and since then has been presenting numerous TV shows and magazines for channels such as MDR, Sat.1, Viva, MTV, RTL2, Pro7, WDR and Premiere. She has also provided coverage of notable events such as the Oscars, the Golden Globes and Grammys Awards. As the presenter on the German version of Fame Academy, in 2003, Meierhenrich was nominated for the Bambi, one of Germany's most precious Awards.

Besides her work as a TV presenter, she successfully works as an actress for both TV and cinema. She starred in movies such as Der Club der grünen Witwen (ZDF), Nachtspuren, Nick Knatterton, Pro7 Märchenstunde (Pro7) and the telenovela Verbotene Liebe (ARD). In 2009 she starred in the drama Saviors in the Night besides Armin Rohde and Veronica Ferres and shot the Sat.1 movie Sind denn alle Männer Schweine? Right after she played the leading role in the TV series Zeit der Entscheidung. In 2010 she starred in the movie Vater Unser and played the leading role in the drama Sterben und sterben lassen, followed by the ZDF series Da kommt Kalle and the ZDF movie Schief gewickelt. On 4 April 2011 the new ZDF series Herzflimmern – Die Klinik am See airs for the first time, where she took over the leading part of young MD Marie Egger.

Nova Meierhenrich is also very involved with charity work and is a longtime partner of SOS Children's Villages and the rolemodel for several animal rights campaigns like the Anti-Fur campaign with PETA and the whale and dolphin campaign with the WDCS.
