= List of Verbotene Liebe cast members =

Complete list of past and present cast members of the German soap opera Verbotene Liebe.

== Main cast ==
Actor	Role	Tenure
Manuela Alphons	Barbara von Sterneck (#2)	1995–1999
Daniel Axt	Jannik Anders	2015
Marc Barthel	Tim Helmke	2014–2015
Janina Isabell Batoly	Bella Jacob, adopted, née Schneider	2012–2015
Frank Behnke	Alexander "Alex" Wiegand	1995, 1996, 2006, 2007
Matthias Beier	Jonas Schelling	2000–2001
Stefanie Bock	Leonie Richter	2011–2013
Kay Böger	Dr. Thomas "Tom" Seifert	1999–2003, 2005
Nina Bott	Julia Mendes, adopted von Anstetten, née Kaufmann (#2)	2011–2012
Nadine Brandt	Stefanie "Steffi" Sander (#2)	1997–2000, 2005
Heike Brentano	Sylvia Jones, née Novak	2002–2005, 2006
Andreas Brucker	Jan Brandner (#1)	1995–1997
Ruth Brück († 27/07/1998)	Erna Prozeski, née Breitner †	1997–1998
Nils Brunkhorst	Robin Brandner	2002–2005
Yvonne Burbach	Cécile de Maron †	2001–2006
Jeaninne Burch	Beatrice von Beyenbach, née Allendorf †	2001–2003
Ingrid Capelle	Fiona Beckmann †	1995–1996 († 1998)
Isabelle Carlson	Barbara von Sterneck (#1)	1995
Günter Clemens	Martin von Beyenbach (#1)	2000–2001
Michaela Conrad	Gabriela "Ela" Anders	1996–1997
Katharina Dalichau	Hanna Novak †	2002–2004
Inez Bjørg David	Vanessa von Beyenbach	2003–2006
Raphaela Dell	Erika Sander	1996, 1997–2000, 2005
Till Demtrøder	Thomas Wolf	2011–2014
Kristina Dörfer	Olivia Schneider †	2006–2009
Christoph Dostal	Lukas Roloff	2001–2002
Solveig Duda	Marie von Anstetten, née von Beyenbach †	2000–2003, 2006 († 2011)
Sam Eisenstein	David McNeil aka Fabian Weiland	2003–2005
Henrike Fehrs	Alexa Berg †	2013–2015
Patrik Fichte	Henning von Anstetten (#3) †	2000–2002
Diana Frank	Katja Brandner †	2008
Clara Gerst	Lara Cornelius, adopted, née Ryan (#2)	2014–2015
Regina Gisbertz	Gina Fröhlich	1995–1997
Meike Gottschalk	Sophie Levinsky	1995–1997, 2005
Wolfram Grandezka	Ansgar von Lahnstein	2004–2015
Hubertus Grimm	Jan Brandner (#2)	2011–2012
Thomas Gumpert	Johannes von Lahnstein †	2003–2008
Mickey Hardt	Dr. Josef "Jo" Helmke	2014–2015
Jens Hartwig	Tristan von Lahnstein	2009–2015
Christine Hatzenbühler	Bastiane von Dannenberg	1997–1998
Katrin Heß	Judith Hagendorf	2008–2009
Tabea Heynig	Anne Siebert	2006–2007
Claudia Hiersche	Carla von Lahnstein	2003–2009, 2010
Broder Hinrichsen	Dr. Gero von Sterneck (#2)	1995–1997, 1998–1999, 2005
Aline Hochscheid	Jaqueline "Jackie" Lamers	1995–1999, 2005
Markus Hoffmann († 16/01/1997)	Henning von Anstetten (#1)	1995–1996
Shai Hoffmann	Fabian Brandner	2008, 2009
Lilli Hollunder	Lisa Brandner, adopted, née Hansen (#2)	2005–2008
Ron Holzschuh	Bernhard "Bernd" von Beyenbach	2003–2007
Alex Huber	Florian Brandner (#2)	2002–2004
Steve Hudson	Philipp Brandner	1999–2000, 2005
Gerry Hungbauer	Martin von Beyenbach (#2) †	2001–2003
Andreas Jancke	Gregor Mann	2005–2010
Isa Jank	Clarissa von Anstetten, née Clara Prozeski	1995–2001, 2011–2013
Nils Julius	Patrick Brockmann	1997–1999
Andreas Jung	Benedikt "Ben" von Anstetten †	1996
Sina-Valeska Jung	Sarah von Lahnstein, adopted Hofmann, née Käppler	2006–2009
Vanessa Jung	Jana von Lahnstein, née Brandner (#2) †	2005–2008
Nina Juraga	Maximiliane "Max" Frei	2005–2006, 2007
Stephan Käfer	Philipp zu Hohenfelden †	2010–2011
Tatjana Kästel	Rebecca von Lahnstein (#2)	2012–2015
Joscha Kiefer	Sebastian von Lahnstein (#1)	2007–2009
Kristian Kiehling	Juri Adam	2013
Jana Julie Kilka	Jessica Stiehl	2010–2014
Stefan Kirch	Felix von Beyenbach (#2)	2003–2006
Ingo Klünder	Peter Kaufmann	1999–2000
Melanie Kogler	Marlene von Lahnstein, née Wolf	2011–2014
Sven Koller	David Brandner	2008–2010
Frédéric A. Komp	Florian Brandner (#1)	1995–1996, 1997, 1998
Lars Korten	Dr. Leonard von Lahnstein	2004–2009
Christoph Kottenkamp	Frank Helmke	2011–2012, 2013–2015
Peter Kotthaus	Nils Petersen	1998, 1999
Kerstin Kramer	Alexandra "Alexa" Seifert	2000–2004
Konrad Krauss	Arno Brandner †	1995–2012
Joachim Kretzer	Paul Schöner	1996–1997
Franziska Kruse	Eva Baumann †	2013–2014
Miriam Lahnstein	Tanja von Lahnstein, née Wittkamp	1995–1998, 2001, 2004–2015
Tanja Lanäus	Juliane "Jule" Roth	2000–2002
Kerstin Landsmann	Katharina "Kati" von Sterneck (#2)	1995–2001, 2005
Clemens Löhr	Simon Roloff	2000–2002, 2005
Jasmin Lord	Rebecca von Lahnstein (#1)	2008–2011
Sotiria Loucopoulos	Nicole Büchner	1995–1996
Manou Lubowski	Gero von Sterneck (#1)	1995
Milan Marcus	Constantin von Lahnstein	2004–2008, 2009, 2010–2011
Krystian Martinek	Ludwig von Lahnstein †	2009–2013 († 2014)
Hendrik Martz	Henning von Anstetten (#2)	1998–2000
Marina Mehlinger	Milena "Milli" Prozeski, née Sander	1997–2000, 2001, 2005
Gabriele Metzger	Charlotte "Charlie" Schneider	1995–2015
Hakim Meziani	Alexander von Deinburg-Thalbach	1997–1998
Nicole Mieth	Kimberly "Kim" von Lahnstein, accepted, née Wolf (#2)	2011–2015
Gojko Mitić	Roberto Fiorani	1996, 1997
Dirk Moritz	Dr. Daniel Fritzsche (#2)	2011–2012
Christoph Mory	Hagen von Lahnstein (#2)	2011–2013, 2014
Mascha Müller	Luise von Waldensteyck	2009–2010
Valerie Niehaus	Julia Sander, adopted von Anstetten, née Kaufmann (#1)	1995–1997
Regina Nowack	Iris Brandner, née Sander †	1995–1996
Philipp Oehme	Thore Hellström	2013–2014
Thomas Ohrner	Matthias Brandner	2008–2010
Sascha Pederiva	Sascha Vukovic	2013–2015
Roland Pfaus	Tim Sander †	1996–1998 († 2001)
Andreas Potulski	Felix von Beyenbach (#1)	2001–2003
Markus Prinz	Daniel Fritzsche (#1)	1999–2002
Kerstin Radt	Gabriella Santos	1999–2002
Kim Riedle	Giselle Schulz	2014
Simone Ritscher	Maria di Balbi aka Maria Galdi †	2009–2011
Stefanie Rösner	Mila von Draskow	2015
Nic Romm	Frederic Schwarz	2015
Dominic Saleh-Zaki	Andreas "Andi" Fritzsche	2001–2007, 2009–2015
Claudia Scarpatetti	Susanne Brandner	1995–1997, 2005–2008, 2012
Mariangela Scelsi	Carola "Coco" Faber	2004–2008
Patricia Schäfer	Viktoria Wolf, née Heinemann †	2011–2013
Alexandra Schalaudek	Anna Konrad	1995–1997
Dinah Alice Schilffarth	Cleo Winter aka Gisela "Gilla" Köster †	1996–1998
Sebastian Schlemmer	Sebastian von Lahnstein (#2)	2009–2015
Thore Schölermann	Christian Mann	2006–2012, 2013
Tobias Schönenberg	Paul Brandner, adopted	2005–2007
Karoline Schuch	Lara Cornelius, adopted, née Ryan (#1)	2000–2002
Remo Schulze	Timo Mendes, adopted, né von Anstetten	2011–2013
Daniel Sellier	Dr. Ricardo Mendes	2011–2014
Bastian Semm	Martin Vogt	2015
Martina Servatius	Elisabeth von Lahnstein, née Cornelius	1999–2015
Katja Sieder	Caroline "Caro" Schulz	2013–2014
Friederike Sipp	Jana Brandner (#1)	2002–2005
Andi Slawinski	Heino Toppe †	1997–2000
Julia Sontag	Martha Wolf	2013
Carsten Spengemann	Mark Roloff †	1999–2003
Insa Magdalena Steinhaus	Katharina "Kati" von Sterneck (#1)	1995
Andreas Stenschke	Ulrich "Ulli" Prozeski	1997–2000, 2001, 2005
Andrea Suwa	Jessica von Deinburg-Thalbach, née Prozeski	1997–1998
Susanne Szell	Birglinde "Biggi" Schuhmann	2013–2014
Lina Tiedtke	Franziska von Beyenbach	2001–2003, 2006
Lisa Tomaschewsky	Kimberly "Kim" Wolf (#1)	2011
Freya Trampert	Nina Ryan	1998–2001, 2002
Herbert Ulrich	Lars Schneider	2002–2005, 2006–2008
Theresa Underberg	Lydia von Lahnstein, née Brandner	2008–2011
Jutta Unterlercher	Carolin von Anstetten, née Mohr	1998–2000, 2005
Tom Viehöfer	Hagen von Lahnstein (#1)	2011
Mirco Wallraf	Ramon Santos †	1995–1998
Renée Weibel	Dr. Helena von Lahnstein	2009–2012
Jo Weil	Oliver "Olli" Sabel	2000–2002, 2007–2015
Tanja Wenzel	Isabell Brandner, née Mohr	1999–2004
Daniel Wiemer	Dennis Krüger	1997–1999, 2000, 2005
Stefan Wilhelmi	Tilmann Fritzsche †	1998–1999
Luke J. Wilkins	Christian Toppe	1999–2001
Diane Willems	Dana Wolf	2011–2014
Jenny Winkler	Nathalie Brandner, née Käppler	2004–2010
Anne Wis	Stella Mann	2008–2009, 2010
Florian Wünsche	Emilio Sanchez	2011–2015
Christian Wunderlich	Frank Levinsky	1995, 1996–1999
Sascha Zaglauer	Rajan Rai †	1996–1997
Luca Zamperoni	Nikolaus "Nick" Prozeski	1997–2000, 2001, 2005
Jürgen Zartmann	Christoph von Anstetten †	1995–2000
Peter Zintner	Walter Prozeski †	1997–1998
Andreas Zimmermann	Markus Fröhlich	1996–1997
Verena Zimmermann	Nicola "Nico" von Lahnstein, accepted, née Brandner	2002–2006, 2006–2007, 2008, 2010–2012, 2015
Klaus Zmorek	Adrian Degenhardt	2007–2009

== Recurring cast and guest appearances ==
Actor	Role	Tenure
Cyndy Alambwa	Laura Tirado	2003
Nicole Allmann	Marina Felix	2007
Daniel Aminati	Daniel Aminati; Sebastian Bachstein	1997; 2002–2003, 2004
Pia Ampaw-Fried	Sonja Jäger	2011–2012
Nadine Arents	Katharina Fischer	2012
Natalia Avelon	Janina Kirsch	2001
Dirk Bach († 01/10/2012)	Priest Hinze	2010
Liz Baffoe	Valerie Jäger	2012
Larissa Baldauf	Yvonne Sennewald	2003
Günter Barton	Harro Helmke	2014–2015
Romina Becks	Miriam Pesch	2007–2012
Florian Benstern	Dirk Beurich	2005
Rolf Berg	Peter Jacob	2012, 2014–2015
Fred Berhoff († 25/02/2008)	Max Orbis †	1995
Sarah Maria Besgen	Michaela Nietschmann; Evelyn Thoma	2000; 2003–2004
Elke Bludau	Elke Käppler	2003–2007
Anika Böcher	Melanie "Lena" Gassner (#2)	1995–1998
Karen Böhne	Nurse Agnes	2015
Gerda Böken	Erika Rieth †	2011
Cosima von Borsody	Dr. Amelie Bentheim	2005
Ricardia Bramley	Antonia Weber †	2010
Manuela Braun	Petra Bosse	2012–2013
Felix Bresser	Stefan König	1995
Daniel Brühl	Benji Kirchner	1995
Nils Brunkhorst (current cast as Robin Brandner)	Heikko Björnsson; Kevin Köster	2001; 2004
Olaf Burmeister	Hermann Schuhmann (#2)	2014
Butz Ulrich Buse	Ed Lauenstein †	1998, 1999
Till Claro	Dr. Lukas Hagemann	1996
Joan Collins	Lady Joan	2010
Kim Collis	Maria Santos, née Leopold	1996, 1998
Hakan Coskuner	Thomas Erichson	1996
Hasso Degner	Richard Allendorf	2001
Daniel Del-Ponte	Jean-Claude Damère	1997
Henning Diedrich	Sebastian Schröder	1996
Holger Doellmann	Ludwig "Luis" Hauser; Joachim Obermann	1996; 1998, 1999
Isabel Dotzauer	Waitress Nicole	2001–2007
Anneke Dürrkopp	Renee Germann	2008
Dennis Rodney Durant	Sven Beckmann	2001
Hendrik Duryn	Oliver Kopp (#1)	1995
Melvin-Maximilian Eisenstein	Johannes "Hannes" von Lahnstein, accepted, né von Anstetten #3	2011–2015
Max Engelke	Robert "Rob" Marenbach	2010
Andreas Engelmann	Donald Rush †	2004
Arzu Ermen	Ines Berger	2000
Cem Erzincan	Luca Caminici	2005
Michael Evers	Gregor Steinfeld	1999
Lara Faßbender	Sarah Petersen	2002
Lea Faßbender	Ariane Perl	2005
Mark Filatov	Oskar Vitus	2010
Maximilian Fischer	Alexander "Alex" Kleine	1997–1998
Angelika Fornell	Henriette Sabel, geb. Schneider (#2)	2010, 2012
Angelo Franke	Angelo Totti	1999–2008, 2009
Holger Franke	Kurt Schiller	2010–2012
Daniel Fritz	Per Mertens	2014–2015
Michael Gahr († 25/11/2010)	Maximilian von Deinburg-Thalbach	1997–1998
Rainer Goernemann	Trutz zu Hohenfelden	2010, 2011
Patrick Gräser	Benjamin "Ben" Schöne	2013, 2014
Karin Graf	Cook Tilda	1996
Thomas Gumpert (current cast as Johannes von Lahnstein)	Lenny Fuchs; Karsten Reichelt; Mr. Brettmann, military policeman Viktor Beyenbach; Hartmut Walser; Stefan Falck, master sergeant	1995; 1997; 1998; 2000; 2002; 2003
Julia Haacke	Kerstin Richter	1997, 2011, 2012
Matthias Haase	Achim Brandner	2003, 2005
Gisela Hahn	Renate Baumann	2013–2014
Jan Hartmann	Carsten Seitz	2004
Jens Hartwig (current cast as Tristan von Lahnstein)	Jens Alba	2002–2003
Jürgen Haug	Wolfgang Mann †	2007
Oliver Heermann	Niclas Stenzel	1995–1999
Elke Heidenreich	Felizitas Haverdorn	2012, 2013, 2015
Marnie Held	Silke Hansen	1995
Henrik Helge	Klaus Kopp	1995
Dan Hembal	Chris Heilmann	1997
Godelieve Henne	Nun Agnes	2001
Antonius Hermlin	Jens Kramer †	2008–2009, 2010
Ursula Heyer	Annegret Wittkamp (#2) †	2008
Bernhard Hoëcker	Bodo Höhfelder; Bernhard Hoëcker	2008; 2009
Gregor Höppner	Kidnapper Leonard †	1997, 1998
Friederike Hofmann	Stefanie "Steffi" Sander (#1)	1996
Axel Holst	Oliver Kopp aka Tobias Schenzer (#2)	1997
Marco Horsch	Moritz Bube	2004, 2005
Ulrich Hub	Marty Schaub	1996
Christian Ingomar	Richard "Ricky" Pflock	2010–2014
Monica Ivancan	Katharina "Kitty" Kübler	2006–2009, 2010
Yuki Iwamoto	Sukimi Yakamoto	2011, 2013
Peter Kaempfe	Rainer Zimmermann	2000–2001
Lars Kalusky	Viktor Cornelsen	2004–2006
Pano Karas	Felix Wiedenmann	1999
Lale Karci	Katrin Pyritz	2000
Lusako Karonga	Karsten Beul †	1998
Katy Karrenbauer	Melina May; Renate Kern; Bärbel Gruber	1995; 1997; 2008
Nick Karry	Waiter John	2013–2015
Bianca Karsten	Camilla von Berneck	2007–2008
Gabriele Kastner	Annegret Wittkamp (#1)	1996
Roland Kieber	Etienne Beaucaire	2000
Stefan Kirch (current cast as Felix von Beyenbach)	Dominik von Hermsdorf	2001
Rosemarie Klein	Marie Linse	2008–2015
Eva Luca Klemmt	Theresa Erzberger	2011
Peter Kotthaus (current cast as Nils Petersen)	Sebastian Adler	1995
Sasha Krasnobajew	Aki Burmeister	1995
Erich Krieg	Bertram "Bert" Hofer; Walter Wittkamp (#2) †	1995–1996; 2011 († 2008)
Peer Kusmagk	Niki di Lorenzo	2008
Vanessa Lahnstein	Inga Kühn	2006–2008
Tina Landgraf	Natascha Seeger	1999–2000, 2001
Roland Lang	Marc Schleicher	1997
Arne Leuchtenberg	Eckhart "Ecki" Nitsche	1996
Adrian Linke	Johann-Maximilian "Max" Jannsen, adopted, né Bohn	2000
Leonhard Mader	Hermann Schuhmann (#1)	2014
Frank Maier	Alexander Rheinsberg	2011–2012
Sabine Marcus	Karin Michels	1995
Lutz Marquardt	Luca Fontanello	2009–2013
Nova Meierhenrich	Meike Breuer, née Wittkamp	2006
Crisaide Mendes	Patricia Villanova	2011
Marcus Michael Mies	Jens Klein	2005
Celine Möller	Vivian Seeger (#2)	2012
Annett Mohamed	Silke Voss	2004–2005
Peter Mustafa	Marc Geppard	1995–1996, 1997
Frank Muth	Roland Hansen	2001–2002
Siri Nase	Juliette Moser	2012
Christian Nill	Frank Ziegler †	2001
Thorsten Nindel	Lukas Böttcher	2014
Karyn von Ostholt	Henrietta von Deinburg-Thalbach; Konstanze de Maron †	1998; 2003, 2004
Claudio Pagonis	Eric Barth	1996–1997
Isabelle Paris	Daniela Bohland	2000–2003
Annika Peimann	Anke Hoffmann	2005
Markus Pfeiffer	Luke Esser	2004
Marc Philipp	Rafael Velasquez	2011
Jan Platte	Sound technician Ralf	2000–2002
Josef Quadflieg	Walter Wittkamp (#1)	1995
Joachim Raaf	Hagen Berg	2004–2005
Alexander Radszun	Prof. Dr. Hans-Dietrich Behrends †	2015
Johanna Xenia Rafalski	Ironer Nicole	2013–2014
Hubertus Regout	Eduard von Tepp	2009–2010
Bernd Reheuser	Vincent Berg †	2013–2014, 2015
Alexandra Reimer	Frederike von Traunitz	2007
Florian Reiners	Prof. Dr. Ludger Voss	2011, 2012, 2013, 2015
Anouschka Renzi	Sonja von Steigenberg	2010, 2011
Simone Ritscher (current cast as Maria di Balbi)	Cecilia de Witt; Christina Hansen; Raphaela Klemm	1995–1996; 2002; 2007
Jasmina Rode-Kircher	Waitress Leni	2012–2015
Christian Rudolf	Guido Niermann	2002
Stefan Rudolf	Sven Hübner	2003
Sıla Şahin	Gina Schmitz	2014
Michaela Schaffrath	Frida Lessing	2012
Lutz Scheffer	Boris Malcho	2012
Jens Schleicher	Daniel Schmidt	2003–2008
Sebastian Schlemmer (current cast as Sebastian von Lahnstein)	Florian Müller	2007
Markus Schmidt	Wolf "Wölfchen" Haubold	1996
Nicole Schweizer	Tine Dröge	2010–2013
Xenia Seeberg	Babette "Barbie" Marx	1997
Susanne Seuffert	Henriette Sabel, geb. Schneider (#1)	2001
Marcel Spang	Waiter Niklas	2009–2012
Lisa Spickschen	Frida Hansen	2013–2014
Melanie Steffens	Samantha "Sam" Zambello	1998
Christiane Stein	Christiane Koslar	1997–2003
Ute Stein	Eva Dorn	1999
Mareen K. Steinhaus	Renate Kaltenbach	1995
Jochen Stern	George Helthay	1996
Alexander Sternberg	Carsten Balbeck	2003
Torsten Stoll	Sebastian Leutner †	2000
Christa Strobel	Wilhelmine "Mimi" Baxter †	2005–2006 († 2009)
Jany Tempel	Lisa von Weidenfels, née von Deinburg-Thalbach	1998
Heike Thiem-Schneider	Lotti Rotfeld	2011, 2012, 2013, 2014
Udo Thies	Mr. Reichle; Dr. Alfred Klose; Marcus Maresch; Dr. Roland Becker	1996; 1997, 1998; 2002; 2007–2009
Claus Thull-Emden	Justus Stiehl aka Karl-Heinz "Kalle" Stiehl	2007–2015
Michael Tietz	Wilhelm III. von Waldensteyck †	2009
Frank Trunz	Herbert Löhneberg	1999–2000
Marcus Vick	Dr. Thomas Lorenz	1995–1996
Dorothea Vorderstemann	Maren Krüger	1995
Bastienne Voss	Eva von Waller-Schönfeld	1997–1998
Brigitte Walbrun	Hannelore Konrad	1995
Sebastian Walch	Conrad Weber	2001–2002
Gregory B. Waldis	Ray Marx	2003
Kristina Walter	Sonja Veltuna	1999
Birgitta Weizenegger	Corinna Hadeler	1996–1997
Claus Wilcke	Monseñor Mateo	2011–2012
Harry Wolff	Bendedikt Schumann	2003–2004
Katrin Wolter	Josie Zech	2012–2013
