= Führer Ex =

- Directed by: Winfried Bonengel
- Written by: Winfried Bonengel; Ingo Hasselbach; Douglas Graham
- Produced by: Laurens Straub; Clementina Hegewisch; Rainer Mockert
- Starring: Aaron Hildebrand; Christian Blümel
- Cinematography: Frank Barbian
- Edited by: Monika Schindler
- Music by: Loek Dikker; Michael Beckmann
- Production companies: MBP (Germany); Next Film; StudioCanal
- Release date: August 31, 2002
- Running time: 107 min.
- Country: Germany
- Language: German
- Budget: €5 000 000

Führer Ex is a German neo-nazi drama film directed by Winfried Bonengel and based on the autobiographical book Die Abrechnung by Ingo Hasselbach. It was entered into the 59th Venice International Film Festival.

== Plot ==
Hacky friends Heiko and Tommy dream of escaping from communist Berlin that has become disgusting to them. Attempting to cross the border leads them to jail. In contrast to the sluggish and closed Heiko, the experienced and courageous Tommy is already familiar with the harsh orders of the model prisons of the GDR, where neo-Nazi groups are in charge. Caught in this hell, where only the snitches and mad beasts survive, Heiko escapes, enlisting the friendship of a local fascist leader, and Tommy decides to desperately escape.

They were destined to see each other only four years later, in Berlin, where Heiko, who became a staunch Nazi, commanded a team of skinheads who had left the underground after the fall of the Wall.

== Cast ==
- Aaron Hildebrand as Tommy Zierer
- Christian Blüme as Heiko Degener
- Jule Flierl as Beate
- Dennis Grabosch as Olaf
- Maxwell Richter as Psycho
- Dieter Laser as Eduard Kellermann
- Harry Baer as Friedhelm Kaltenbach
- Matthias Freihof as Stasi officer

== Reviews ==
Tobias Kniebe writing for Süddeutsche Zeitung said: "'Führer Ex' is not a particularly clever or even elegant film. He achieves a directness that otherwise only B-films allow [...] 'Lack of differentiation', 'showmanship', 'one-dimensional characters', 'simplified schemata of cause and effect' — such and similar phrases are the two [Winfried Bonengel and Ingo Hasselbach] have heard so often, until the nausea made further conversations impossible [...] But it could be that Bonengel and Hasselbach, after years of dealing with right-wing youths, simply had no desire, a film for critics and television editors close. That they may have seen their audience elsewhere, on the street perhaps, and that they wanted to get into heads that the ruling discourse just can not reach."
