= TM Garret =

German-American author and human rights activist

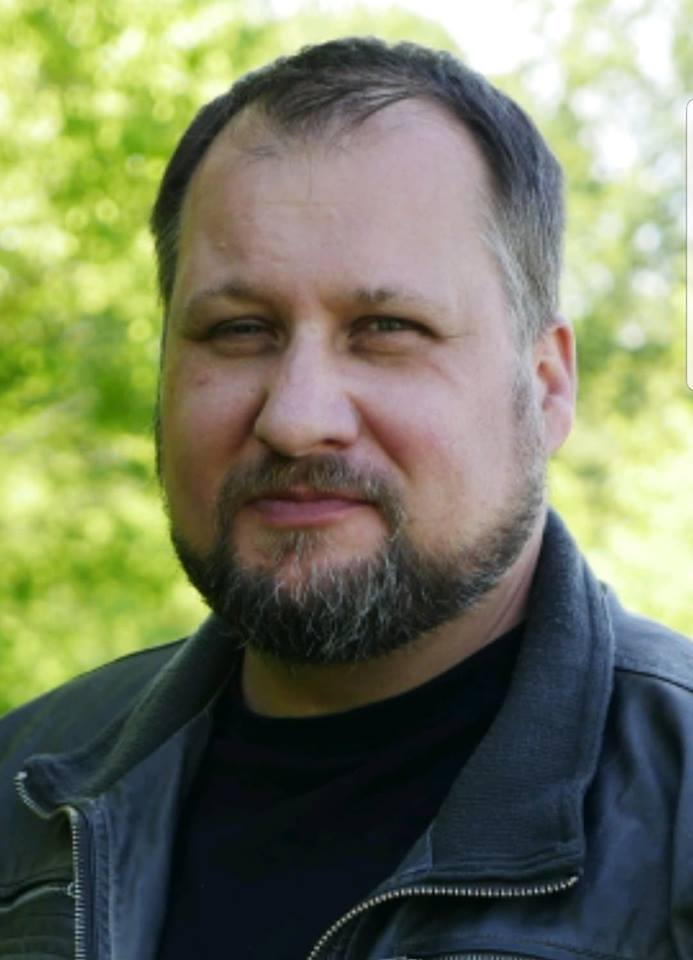
- Born: Achim Schmid; Mosbach, Germany
- Occupations: Author; Producer; Filmmaker; Human rights activist

TM Garret Schmid (born Achim Schmid), publicly known as TM Garret, is a German-American author, producer, filmmaker, and human rights activist. A former white supremacist, he is the founder of C.H.A.N.G.E., a Memphis-based non-profit organization which engages in community outreach programs and anti-racism campaigns.

== Early life ==
TM Garret was born as Achim Schmid in Mosbach, Germany, and raised in a small nearby town. He was raised by his mother, a cook, after his parents divorced. His father, a boatman, died when Garret was eight years old. He became attracted to Nationalist groups at the age of 13 and radicalized in the years after.

He became a white supremacist, and founded a series of racist skinhead bands with names like Celtic Moon, Wolfsrudel (Wolfspack), and Höllenhunde (Hounds of Hell). Later he became a member of a German Ku Klux Klan faction and formed his own KKK group which he later left; it disbanded in 2002.

== Career ==
After leaving the white supremacist movement in 2002, Garret used his experience he collected during that time to found companies in the call-center and internet marketing industry, the music industry, and a licensed job-recruitment company.

After moving to the Memphis metro area to work with his long-time friend and business partner Colonel Robert Morris, he founded PicArts Media, a film production and promotion company, and Mid South Music Entertainment, a record label and booking company. He worked with artists like Canadian Idol runner-up Jaydee Bixby, Jimmy Miles, Dani Fouts, and T. Graham Brown; TV personalities such as Mark Muller who starred in God, Guns & Automobiles; and the "princess of country music" Georgette Jones, the daughter of George Jones and Tammy Wynette. Garret sold the entertainment group in 2015.

== Awards and recognition ==
On December 5, 2014, Garret and his artist Jimmy Miles were awarded with a resolution from the Alabama State Senate, signed by Senator Roger Bedford Jr.

In 2014 he helped promote T. Graham Brown's duet "He'll Take Care of You" with Vince Gill, a song from Brown's album Forever Changed, which was nominated for a Grammy Award in the category of Best Roots Gospel Album.

In 2015 Garret was nominated for Manager of the Year and Videographer of the Year at the annual Nashville Universe Awards.

== Published works ==
Garret published two books in Germany under his birth name, Achim Schmid. Umsatzmaschine Leads – Der richtige Umgang mit Leads ("Moneymaker Leads – How to successfully use Leads") was published in 2012 by TPV Verlag, and his autobiography Vergessene Erinnerung - Bis Alles in Scherben fällt ("Forgotten Memory - Until everything falls apart") was released on Edition Widerschein in September 2016.

== Activism ==
=== Simon Wiesenthal Center ===
Garret started working with the Simon Wiesenthal Center in fall 2018, travelling to conferences, campuses to speak to students about the effects of hate and racism and the opportunities for engagement and community building.

=== EXIT Deutschland and US EXIT Project ===
In 2015 Garret started working with Exit Deutschland, a German anti-Nazi organization which was founded to combat the far-right and to help people leave hate groups. He became their US ambassador and runs an American bases EXIT program under the umbrella of C.H.A.N.G.E.

Garret is developing his own EXIT program, which includes the Erasing the Hate tattoo removal campaign, participation in community events, counseling and therapy sessions, and visits to places like the National Civil Rights Museum and the Withers Collection Museum and Gallery, both located in Memphis.

Since November 2019 he is also a staff member at Parents for Peace, a non-governmental public health nonprofit organization that works to counter extremism.

=== C.H.A.N.G.E. ===
After the fatal confrontation between law enforcement and Alton Sterling in Louisiana in 2016 kicked off a series of events, Garret decided to start the non-profit organization C.H.A.N.G.E Inc., which engages in community outreach programs, food drives, seminars, anti-racism campaigns and anti-violence campaigns. C.H.A.N.G.E stands for Care, Hope, Awareness, Need, Give and Education. The organization holds recurring events in high-poverty areas and supports black communities.

=== Tattoo covering ===
In August 2017, Garret partnered with artists working at Sick Side Tattoo & Body Piercing Studio in Horn Lake, Mississippi (Memphis Metro Area). Together they work to cover up racist and gang-related tattoos through the Erase the Hate campaign. Soon, other tattoo parlors joined the campaign and offer to cover up racist and gang related tattoos for free. The service is currently available in Horn Lake, Mississippi, Memphis, Tennessee, Jacksonville, Florida, and Los Angeles, California. The campaign was featured in the short film Rewired, a documentary by the Chapman University about Garret, local news outlets German national television show Galileo and other international formats.

=== hateXchange ===
Together with other activists and members of Exit Deutschland, Garret developed HateXchange, the official counterpart to EXIT Deutschland's award-winning program named Hass Hilft (Donate the Hate), where residents and sponsors turn neo-Nazi marches into "involuntary walk-a-thons" by raising money for an anti-extremist organization. Besides "walk-a-thons" and "park-a-thons" as on November 10, 2017 in Charleston, South Carolina, donations are also involuntarily raised by hate comments on social media. $1 per collected comment is donated to non-profit organizations like Life After Hate, Human Rights Watch, the Southern Poverty Law Center and selected local non-profits.

=== Memphis Peace Conference ===
He is also the founder and organizer of the annual Memphis Peace Conference, which includes an inter-faith and a community panel and was first held at Withers Collection Museum and Gallery in Memphis on September 29, 2018.

== Other activities ==
Garret fills in as an anchor on weekend news on WGN-TV in Chicago.

He is an outspoken interfaith activist and director and board member of World Religion Day Memphis, US ambassador for anti-Nazi group Exit Germany, and campus speaker against anti-Semitism for the Simon Wiesenthal Center.

He led a discussion at Pomona College, Claremont, California, in 2019.

== TV series ==
After an article about his tattoo cover-up campaign, published in The Guardian, went viral, Garret was approached by several major TV production companies to film a docuseries about his work. On February 18, 2019 he signed an agreement with Koska Ltd. from Brighton, England, headed by former MD of Warner Bros TV Production U.K. Nick Emmerson. As of 2019 Koska was working on a docuseries with Garret for the U.S. and international TV and SVOD markets.

== Radio career ==
Garret started developing one of the first web-based German radio shows in 2000, which ran for no longer than six months.

In 2004 he joined Radio Union with his new radio show Songwriter's Corner, which aired on Sunday nights on CountryMusic24, Germany's biggest country radio station. He became the station's Co-Chief director until he quit in early 2006.

Garret and his partner Pastor Ray Johnson, a former gang member, currently host Let's Erase The Hate, a weekly talk radio show, on CBS affiliate Memphis radio station KWAM, which can be received locally on FM107.9 and AM990, as well as an internet live stream.

== Personal life ==
Garret legally changed his name to TM Garret Schmid in 2018.
