= Dennis Grabosch =

German actor (born 1978)

- Born: 2 March 1978 (age 48); Wedel, Germany
- Occupation: Actor
- Years active: 1996–present
- Spouse: Brent Magee (m. 2007)

Dennis Grabosch (born 2 March 1978) is a German actor. He is perhaps best known for his portrayal of 'Roman Wild' in the German daily soap opera Alles was zählt on RTL. As an actor, he has appeared in many television and film productions such as Ein Fall für zwei, Tatort: Einmal täglich, Tatort: Der Traum von der Au, Drei mit Herz, Kommissar Rex, and Doppelter Einsatz. He has also written a few screenplays and directed works for theatre and short films.

== Biography ==
Grabosch has had a long career in movies and television, beginning at the young age of 13, when he won Tele 5's screenplay competition with his short story Der erste Kuß (The First Kiss). Over the next years, he wrote and directed for theatre and short films, including writing the screenplay for actress Katja Studt's short movie Sechshundertzweiunddreißig ('Sixhundred Thirty-four') in 2005.

In 1992, he appeared in Biography: A Game, a comedy play by Max Frisch at the Ludwig-Meyn-Gymnasium in Uetersen.

As one of the original Alles was zählt cast members, he was on the show from its beginning in September 2006 until September 2011. Although he played a professional figure skater, Grabosch did not know how to ice skate before being cast in this role. He was substantially involved in creating, in cooperation with Alles was zählt's writers, the reunion storyline of the popular pairing known as Dero (Deniz Öztürk and Roman). In February 2008, Alles was zählt was awarded Blu Magazine's Best National TV Format award for its portrayal of the relationship between 'Deniz and 'Roman'. Both actors, Igor Dolgatschew ('Deniz') and Grabosch accepted the award on behalf of the series. While their story was spotlighted, the "DeRo" storyline reached a wide international fanbase with over 12,000 subscribers on YouTube. In May 2010, the show had to cut a love scene featuring Grabosch due to censorship by the FSK. He left the show on 15 September 2011, when his character died of a brain tumor.

In 2007, Grabosch directed a short film Everything About My Mum with David Imper.

In 2009, he illustrated the cover of Kiki Kufenflitzer – Der Eiskristall, a children's book written by Tanja Szewczenko, his former co-star on Alles was zählt. Szewczenko's book is based on a caricature of a young girl he originally drew for her birthday, and was further developed for the book's cover and promotional illustrations.

In February 2015, he was in Porn – The Musical, a narrative drama performed at Schwules Museum in Berlin.

== Personal life ==
Grabosch has two brothers. Like the character he played on Alles was zählt, Grabosch is openly gay. He was once beaten up in a homophobic attack. In 2007, he married Brent Magee, a psychologist. While Grabosch was in Alles was zählt, they lived in Cologne. They both then moved to London. He likes to walk in Brompton Cemetery.

== Filmography ==
=== Film ===
Year	Title	Role
2000	Schneller als der Zug (short)	Erik
2002	Zwischen den Sternen (short)	Chris
2002	Führer Ex	Olaf
2007	Rockende Helden (short)	Er

=== TV ===
Year	Title	Role	Notes
1996	Crash Kids	Unnamed kid	TV film
1996	Unter uns	Bob Kramer	TV series, 1 episode
1997	Die große Liebe ("First Love")	Nottker	TV series, 1 episode
1997	A Case for Two	Oliver Zenker	TV series, 1 episode
1997	Die Kids von Berlin	Peter	TV series, 1 episode
1997	Einsatz Hamburg Süd	Harry	TV series, 1 episode
1997	Der Mordsfilm	Daniel Münter	TV series, 1 episode
1997-2007	Tatort	Pierre Traublinger (2007) / Tobias Helberg (2000) / Hubert Kamphofen (1997)	TV series, 3 episodes
1998	Lisa Falk - Eine Frau für alle Fälle	Nick Brenner	TV series, 1 episode
1998	Heimatgeschichten	Freddie	TV series, 1 episode
1998	Dr. Monika Lindt - Kinderärztin, Geliebte, Mutter	Olli Kroll	TV series, 1 episode
1998	Koerbers Akte: Rollenspiel	Achim	TV film
1998	Schloßhotel Orth	Tom Behringer	TV series, 1 episode
1999	Evelyn Hamann's Geschichten aus dem Leben	Benjamin	TV series, 1 episode
1999	Einfach Klasse!	(unknown role)	TV mini series
1999	Ärzte	Dr. Vogt - Verhängnisvolle Diagnose	TV series, 1 episode
1999	Drei mit Herz	Sven Michaelsen	TV series, 4 episodes
1999	Schicksalsmelodie ("Destiny Melody")	Peter	TV film
1999-2004	SOKO 5113	Harry (2004)/ Markus Lechner (1999)	TV series, 2 episodes
2000	Verlorene Kinder	Lotze Werner	TV film
2000	Rex: A Cop's Best Friend	Sascha Lerchner	TV series, 1 episode
2000	Im Fadenkreuz	(unknown role)	TV series, 1 episode
2000	Küstenwache	Till	TV series, 1 episode
2000	Doppelter Einsatz	Benjamin Kerner	TV series, 1 episode
2000	Meine Mutter, meine Rivalin	Peter	TV film
2001	Für alle Fälle Stefanie	Uwe Müller	TV series, 1 episode
2001	Die Kommissarin ("Lady Cop")	Malte Bach	TV series, 1 episode
2001	Leipzig Homicide	Friedrich Mauthner	TV series, 1 episode
2001	Der Fahnder	(unknown role)	TV series, 1 episode
2002	Abschnitt 40	Herr Friedrich	TV series, 1 episode
2002	Our Charly	Frank Bach or Frank Back	TV series, 6 episodes
2002	Der Wannsee-Mörder	Lukas Andersen	TV film
2002	In aller Freundschaft	Paul	TV series, 1 episode
2002-2003	Wolff's Turf	Bernd Schäfer	TV series, 2 episodes
2003	Polizeiruf 110	Cinema leader	TV series, 1 episode
2003	Die Liebe kommt als Untermieter	(unknown role)	TV film
2003	SOKO Kitzbühel	Roland Drechsler	TV series, 1 episode
2005	The Air Rescue Team	Michael Freidel	TV series, 1 episode
2006	SOKO Wismar	Krille Jablonski	TV series, 1 episode
2006-2011	Alles was zählt	Roman Wild	TV series, 111 episodes
2012	Notruf Hafenkante	Etienne	TV series, 1 episode
