= Dolgachyov =

Dolgachyov (Russian: Долгачёв), also transliterated as Dolgachev from the Russian form written without diacritics is a Russian surname. Feminine forms: Dolgachyova/Dolgacheva. Notable people with the surname include:

- Igor Dolgachev
- Igor Dolgatschew
- Viktoriya Prokopenko née Dolgacheva, Russian triple jumper
- Vyacheslav Dolgachyov (born 1950), Russian theatre director and teacher, Honored Artist of the Russian Federation
