= Jimmy Miles =

American singer-songwriter

- Born: August 19, 1967 (age 58)
- Children: James Destin Miles (1999); Shawn Bradly Miles (1988); Dillion Wayne Atkins (1995)
- Musical career
- Genres: Country, Outlaw Country
- Occupations: musician, guitarist, singer, songwriter
- Instruments: Vocals, guitar
- Labels: Platinum Plus Records (2003); M.A.J.O.R. (2004); Mid South Music Records (2014)
- Website: www.jimmymiles.net

James Edward Miles (born August 19, 1967) is an American Outlaw Country musician, singer and songwriter. He is best known for co-writing and recording the patriotic song "Country Born, American Made" and for his performances at the Waylon Jennings Fest in Whiteface, Texas.

== Early life ==
Jimmy Miles was born in Winfield, Alabama, to used car salesman, Larry Gene Miles, and factory worker Barbara Ann Lockhart. The family was poor and Jimmy's parents divorced when he was young. His father moved to Illinois, leaving his wife and six children behind. The family went through hard times and Jimmy learned very early to work hard. They moved a lot, and he visited different schools. Jimmy started singing in a Church at the age of eight and formed his first band at the age of 18.

== Music ==
=== Early career ===
Jimmy Miles played in several bands, but the most remarkable was "The Southern Pride Band", which was disbanded a couple of times, until he decided to perform as Jimmy Miles and The Southern Pride Band. The Band played all over the South in bar joints and honky tonks

=== First Recordings ===
Jimmy Miles recorded his first album "One For The Lady" for Nashville-based record label Platinum Plus Records in 2003. The album was recorded with studio musicians. He felt so "polished and groomed", and decided he liked "his way much better" so he left Platinum Plus after the term of one year. In 2004 he recorded the live album "Live From Hosshead Central" on M.A.J.O.R. Records. Five of the 12 recorded songs were written by Jimmy Miles. The record was produced by Waylon Jennings son Buddy Dean Jennings.

=== Major Record Deal and current career ===
Jimmy Miles signed a new record deal with Memphis-based record label Mid South Music Records in February 2014. The new label under label owner M Garret gave him the needed freedom and Jimmy was able to develop his music and a new career. The label also pitched Jimmy Country Born, American Made, a song that was originally written by Colonel Robert Morris, who died before he could finish it. It was modeled on Mark Muller protagonist on History Channel's reality TV show God, Guns & Automobiles. The song was finally finished by record label owner and Jimmy's manager TM Garret, Jimmy Miles and guitarist Tim Mordecai. The song was recorded in Alabama and mixed by Nashville producer Mark Moseley who also has worked with household names like Tanya Tucker, George Jones, Willie Nelson and Garth Brooks. The official music video for the song was filmed at Mark Muller's Car Dealership in Butler, MO and also co-stars Mark Muller. Jimmy Miles 2014 summer tour was named after the soon to be released single and closed at the Waylon Jennings Fest in Whiteface, TX where he played the third year in a row.

The single charted #1 on the Independent Hot Country Charts, #8 on the Independent Music Network Charts and #1 on Ireland-based Clay's Country Radio.

In November 2014 Jimmy Miles and The Southern Pride Band received an Alabama State Senate Award from Senator Roger Bedford for the song.

Jimmy Miles also will be featured in the photo book We The People by Canadian photographer Ben Philippi.

He is recording his current album on Mid South Music Records in December 2014 in Nashville, TN. One of the songs will be a duet with "The Princess of Country Music" Georgette Jones, who is the daughter of Country Legend George Jones and Tammy Wynette. Another duet will be recorded with Country Star T. Graham Brown.

He also will tour in Europe for several shows in 2015.

In his career, Jimmy Miles has shared a stage with David Frizell, Johnny Lee, Shooter Jennings, Jackson Taylor, Cooder Graw, Jason Cassidy and others.
