= Alles was zählt =

German TV soap opera series (2006-present)

- Current Alles was zählt intertitle
- Also known as: AWZ (abbreviation)
- Genre: Soap opera
- Created by: Guido Reinhardt
- Written by: Sarah Höflich, Katrin Esser, Camilla Sauer, Tom Chroust, Nina Blum, Peter Holzwarth
- Country of origin: Germany
- Original language: German
- No. of episodes: 5,188

Production
- Executive producers: Guido Reinhardt; Rainer Wemcken
- Running time: 25 minutes

Original release
- Network: RTL
- Release: 4 September 2006 – present

Alles was zählt ("All That Matters") is a German television soap opera first broadcast on RTL on 4 September 2006.

== Plot ==
The original plot revolved around Diana Sommer's dream to become a world class ice skater. She fell in love with Julian Herzog, who signed her at the prestigious Steinkamp Sport and Wellness Center, run by the unscrupulous Steinkamp dynasty. Diana and Julian eventually became a couple, but in November 2007, Julian suffered a brain hemorrhage and died during their wedding. Diana remained in Essen until January 2009, when she left to join a skating centre in Halle. The story continues to revolve around the Steinkamp Sport and Wellness Centre and its quest to become a sporting powerhouse, as well as the lives of the characters who work at and around the Centre.

== Backstage Information ==
AWZ is the third daily soap on RTL, created after Gute Zeiten, schlechte Zeiten and Unter uns. While the show is set in Essen, filming takes place in Cologne.

Tanja Szewczenko is — like Diana, the character she played — a famous German ice skater. In January 2009, she left the series to pursue her skating career.

In February 2008, AWZ was awarded Blu Magazine's Best National TV Format award for its portrayal of the relationship between Deniz and Roman. Actors Igor Dolgatschew and Dennis Grabosch accepted the award on behalf of the series. While their story was spotlighted, the "DeRo" storyline reached a wide international fanbase with over 12,000 subscribers on YouTube.

The series is produced by Grundy UFA productions, the same company responsible for RTL's other daily soaps. In October 2007, this show and Unter uns were part of the first-ever crossover of two soap operas in Germany, when characters from AWZ (Vanessa, Nina, and Tim) attended a concert by Mars from Unter uns (episode 289); Mars later performed an impromptu concert at the No. 7 (episode 296). In April 2010, another RTL crossover featured Helmut Orosz and Mehrzad Marashi from DSDS performing a duet in the No. 7 (episode 904).

The theme song, "Nie genug", is sung by Austrian singer Christina Stürmer; she returned with her band to perform two numbers for Ben and Isabelle's wedding, "Warum" (episode 1000) and "Juniherz" (episode 1001).

== Cast ==
=== Current main cast ===
Actor	Role	Episodes	Years	Notes
Tanja Szewczenko	Diana Sommer, accepted, née Reichert	1–588; 2415–	2006–2009; 2016–2018	Former figure skater, currently skater trainer; daughter of Jutta; grandchild of Lutz; ex-fiancée of Julian; ex-girlfriend of Oliver and Lars; ex-lover of Mike; one-night-stand of Deniz, ex-girlfriend of Brandon
Tatjana Clasing	Simone Steinkamp, née von Altenburg	1–	2006–	Owner and manager of "Steinkamp Sports & Wellness"; mother of Maximilian (by her riding instructor when she was a teen) and of Jenny and Vanessa (by Richard); grandmother of Letizia, Alexander, Sophia, Annabelle and Henry; daughter of Friederike; half-sister of Carmen; aunt of Michelle; cousin of Constantin; wife of Richard; ex-fiancée of David; ex-girlfriend of Rafael; ex-lover of Axel; one-night-stand of her brother-in-law Rüdiger
Silvan-Pierre Leirich	Richard Steinkamp	1–	2006–	Owner and director of "Steinkamp Sports & Wellness", now borough mayor of Essen-Schotterberg; father of Jenny and Vanessa (by Simone), Ben (by ex-lover Nadja), Marco (by ex-lover Monika) and Nikolas (by ex-lover Céline); stepfather of Maximilian; grandfather of Annabelle and Henry; brother of Rüdiger; uncle of Franziska; husband of Simone; ex-fiancé of Claudia; ex-lover of Annette
Julia Augustin	Vanessa Steinkamp	2–667; 985–1378; 1733–1758; 2033–	2006–2009; 2010–2012; 2013; 2014–	Ice-hockey player, now medicine student in practical year; daughter of Simone and Richard; sister of Jenny; half-sister of Ben, Maximilian, Marco and Nikolas; niece of Rüdiger and Carmen; cousin of Juli, Franziska and Michelle; aunt of Letizia; wife of Christoph; mother of Henry; ex-girlfriend of Ben (they broke up when they discovered they were related), Deniz, Tom and Nick; studied medicine in Boston, then returned to Essen, where she was the majority stakeholder of "Steinkamp Sports & Wellness"
André Dietz	Ingo Zadek	7–	2006–	Ice-hockey trainer, physiotherapist and masseur at "Steinkamp Sports and Wellness", also pursued a career as a comedian for a short time; half-brother of Marie; widower of Annette; ex-boyfriend of Lena and Céline; father of Zoé; foster father of Melanie, Diana's fiancée, owner of "MultiFriends"
Juliette Greco	Lena Bergmann	181–1608; 1772–	2007–2013; 2013–	(1st actress in the role); Ballet teacher and fitness trainer at "Steinkamp Sports & Wellness"; daughter of Peter; sister of Annette; half-sister of Katja; cousin of Ronny; ex-wife of Robin van Kampen, Maximilian and Marian (married for immigration reasons and subsequently began dating); ex-girlfriend of Ingo, Mike and Florian; ex-lover of Oliver, Rafael and Thomas; mother of Alexander (with Maximilian), ex-affair of Patrick
Igor Dolgatschew	Deniz Öztürk	229–	2007–	Co-owner of "Pumpwerk" together with Jenny. Jenny's boyfriend. Former management intern/Richard’s personal assistant at "Steinkamp Sports and Wellness"; formerly pursued careers as hockey player, rentboy, pair skater with Stella and Roman, fashion model, gay callboy and owner of car service; son of Veronika and Marian; father of Jonas (with ex-lover Jessica); cousin of Can; grandchild of Melek; ex-boyfriend of Nina, Vanessa, Roman, Melanie, Sarah and Sonja; ex-lover of Stella, Jessica, Franziska, and Bea; one-night-stand of Annette, Diana, Kaja, Patrick, Zoé, Katja, Letizia and numerous punters.
Jörg Rohde	Ben Steinkamp, accepted, né Roschinski	802–	2009–	(2nd actor in the role); Owner of the club "A40"; former managing "Steinkamp Sports & Wellness" alongside Richard and Maximilian; illegitimate son of Nadja and Richard, half-brother of Jenny, Vanessa, Marco and Nikolas; nephew of Rüdiger; cousin of Franziska; ex-husband of Isabelle and Bea; fiancé of Carmen; ex-boyfriend of Katja, Vanessa, Julia and Iva; one-night-stand of Zoé and Raquel
Ania Niedieck	Isabelle Reichenbach	905–2385; 2632–	2010–2016; 2017–	Professional figure skater who took first place in the Essen Cup, then working as trainer/skating consultant at "Steinkamp Sports & Wellness", finally waitress in the "No. 7"; daughter of Helena and Philipp; sister of Tom; half-sister of Larissa; mother of Sophia (with Maximilian); wife of Johann; ex-wife of Ben and Maximilian; ex-girlfriend of Thomas; ex-lover of Marco, Felix and Tim; one-night-stand of Leo and various others
Kaja Schmidt-Tychsen	Jennifer "Jenny" Steinkamp	1325–	2011–	(3rd official actress in the role); Former figure skater, currently co-owner of "Pumpwerk", former temporary owner "Steinkamp Sports & Wellness" and skater trainer; daughter of Simone and Richard; sister of Vanessa; half-sister of Ben, Maximilian, Marco and Nikolas; niece of Rüdiger and Carmen; cousin of Juli, Franziska and Michelle; mother of Annabelle (with David); aunt of Letizia and Henry; wife of Veit; ex-wife of Julian and Axel; ex-girlfriend of Lars and Hendrik; ex-lover of Maximilian, Marian and Marco; one-night-stand of David, girlfriend of Deniz.
Lars Korten	Christoph Lukowski	2108–	2015–	Management consultant, partner of "Steinkamp Sports & Wellness"; father of Iva and Henry; husband of Vanessa; ex-husband of Sylvie; one-night-stand of Tina
Franziska Benz	Michelle Bauer	2372–	2016–	Figure skater at "Steinkamp Sports & Wellness"; daughter of Carmen and Vincent; niece of Simone and Richard; cousin of Maximilian, Jenny and Vanessa; great-cousin of Letizia, Alexander, Sophia, Annabelle and Henry; one-night-stand of Leo, testimonial of Jenny and Deniz' "Pumpwerk"-campaign, fake-girlfriend of Tim, on-off-girlfriend of Ronny
Heike Warmuth	Carmen Bauer	2375–	2016–	Businesswoman, manager of "No. 7"; mother of Michelle; half-sister of Simone; aunt of Maximilian, Jenny and Vanessa; great-aunt of Letizia, Alexander, Sophia, Annabelle and Henry; fiancée of Ben; ex-girlfriend of Vincent
Cheyenne Pahde	Marie Schmidt	2468–	2016–	(2nd actress in the role); Figure skater at "Steinkamp Sports & Wellness"; half-sister of Ingo; aunt of Zoé; ex-girlfriend of Leo and Tobi; ex-lover of Milan
Daniel Buder	Vincent Thalbach	2524–	2016–	Father of Michelle; ex-boyfriend of Carmen, luxury car-dealer and a ruthless high-profile criminal known as the "Transporter"
Bela Klentze	Ronny Bergmann	2563–	2016–	Carpenter; nephew of Peter; cousin of Annette, Lena and Katja, on-off-boyfriend of Michelle
Maike Johanna Reuter	Pauline Reusch	2793–	2017–	Nurse
Christian Feist	Damian Steinkamp	2821–	2017–	Lawyer, cousin 2nd degree of Richard and Rüdiger

=== Former main cast ===
Actor	Character	Episodes	Years	Comments
Susanne Schlenzig	Jutta Sommer, née Hoffmann	1–178; 312–315	2006–2007	Mother of Diana; daughter of Dieter; ex-wife of Dieter; moved to Cuxhaven
Jan Niklas Berg	Ben Roschinski	2–220	2006–2007	(1st actor in the role)
Andreas Seyferth	Lutz Hoffmann	1–234	2006–2007	Father of Jutta; grandfather of Diana; went to live with his daughter in Cuxhaven
Armin Dallapiccola	Dieter Sommer	1–250	2006–2007	Father of Nina; brother of Manfred; uncle of Oliver; ex-husband of Jutta; went to Eisenhüttenstadt to take a job as a facility manager
Thorsten Grasshoff	Julian Herzog †	1–313	2006–2007	Brother of Tim; ex-husband of Jenny; fiancé of Diana; died at the altar due to a brain haemorrhage
André Emanuel Kaminski	Tim Herzog	5–321	2006–2007	Brother of Julian; ex-boyfriend of Nina and Ben; left Essen after Julian's death to start a new life
Regine Seidler	Nadja Roschinski	3–358; 999–1001	2006–2008; 2010	(1st actress in the role); Returns for Ben and Isabelle's wedding
Christiane Klimt	Jennifer "Jenny" Steinkamp	1–452	2006–2008	(1st actress in the role)
Birgit Würz	Nadja Roschinski	359–576	2008	(2nd actress in the role); Skating choreographer at "Steinkamp Sports and Wellness"; mother of Ben; ex-girlfriend of Mike, Richard and Marian; moved to Rome for a new job
Maria Wedig	Julietta "Juli" Sommer, née von Altenburg	362–717	2008–2009	Daughter of Constantin; niece of Simone; cousin of Jenny, Vanessa and Maximilian; granddaughter of Friederike; pursued careers as figure skater, waitress in the "No. 7" and banking; ex-wife of Maximilian (convenience marriage) and Oliver; left Essen for California after separating from Oliver
Nathalie Thiede	Nina Sommer	1–793	2006–2009	Personal assistant to Dr. Axel Schwarz at "Steinkamp Sports and Wellness"; daughter of Dieter; niece of Manfred; cousin of Oliver; ex-girlfriend of Tim, Deniz and Axel; left to work for Male Function in California after realising there was no future with Axel
Stephen Dürr	Mike Hartwig †	1–810	2006–2009	Ice-skating trainer at "Steinkamp Sports and Wellness"; ex-boyfriend of Nadja and Lena; ex-lover of Diana; died in explosion while saving Lena from her father's nemesis
Tobias Licht	Lars Berger	469–882	2008–2010	Skating choreographer at "Steinkamp Sports and Wellness"; boyfriend of Stella; ex-boyfriend of Diana; ex-lover of Jenny; moved to Switzerland with Stella
Nadine Rennack	Stella Coretti	576–882	2008–2010	Skater on the Steinkamp team; daughter of Anton; godchild of Marian; girlfriend of Lars; ex-lover of Deniz; moved to Switzerland for rehab after being involved in a car accident and then prematurely returning to training and paralyzing herself
Carolin von der Groeben	Zoé Laffort	459–986	2008–2010	(1st actress in the role)
Norman Kalle	Dr. Oliver Sommer	156–267; 322–758; 828–1008	2007; 2007–2009; 2009–2010	Formerly the in-house doctor at "Steinkamp Sports and Wellness", now works with an African aid organisation; son of Manfred; nephew of Dieter; cousin of Nina; husband of Céline: ex-husband of Nina; ex-boyfriend of Diana; moved to Australia with Céline
Nina Bott	Céline Sommer, née Laffort	465–1008	2008–2010	Cook at "No. 7"; mother of Zoé; wife of Oliver; ex-wife of Maximilian; ex-girlfriend of Ingo; ex-lover of Richard; moved to Australia with Oliver
Silvia Maleen	Jennifer "Jenny" Steinkamp	501–1023	2008–2010	(2nd actress in the role); Was presumed dead after her flight disappeared over Russia
Heike Trinker	Claudia Bergmann, née Linden	825–844; 928–1225	2009–2010; 2010–2011	Figure skating choreographer hired to work with the Steinkamp team; mother of Katja; ex-wife of Peter Bergmann; ex-fiancée of Richard; moved to Rosenheim after her engagement to Richard ended
Dennis Grabosch	Roman Wild †	2–1267	2006–2011	Figure skater, placed third in both the World and European championships before pursuing a career as a trainer and then as sports manager of "Steinkamp Sports and Wellness"; brother of Florian, ex-boyfriend of Marc, Andrew and Deniz; died of a brain tumour
Christoph Humnig	Tom Reichenbach	958–1300; 1373–1378	2010–2011; 2012	Videogame developer; son of Helena and Philipp; brother of Isabelle; half-brother of Larissa; uncle of Sophia; ex-boyfriend of Katja; boyfriend of Vanessa; left for Boston after he and Vanessa break up
Ulrike Röseberg	Annette Bergmann †	1–1445	2006–2012	Lessee of the "Pommesschranke" fry stand near the Steinkamp Centre and sometimes costume designer; daughter of Peter; sister of Lena; half-sister of Katja; cousin of Ronny; aunt of Alexander; wife of Ingo; ex-lover of Richard; one-night-stand of Deniz; died after Jenny ran over her in her car
Michael N. Kuehl	Florian Wild	928–1544	2010–2012	Assistant janitor at "Steinkamp Sports and Wellness"; raised in Gunzenhausen, came to Essen to pursue his dream of playing professional hockey; brother of Roman; boyfriend of Franziska; ex-boyfriend of Lena; follows Franziska to Canada
Julia Engelmann	Franziska Steinkamp	1024–1544	2010–2012	Daughter of Rüdiger; niece of Richard; cousin of Jenny, Vanessa, Ben, Marco and Nikolas; poses as a boy ("Frank Schneider") to increase her chances of playing professional hockey; girlfriend of florian; ex-lover of Deniz; went to Canada after becoming part of a famous ice-hockey team
Rosetta Pedone	Viktoria König	1485–1582	2012	Ex-wife of Marco; ex-girlfriend of Jochen; went to New York
Christina Siemoneit	Sarah Wendt	1273–1616	2011–2013	Hip-hop dancer; sister of Melanie; ex-girlfriend of Marco and Deniz; went to Paris
Katharina Woschek	Zoé Laffort	1466–1666	2012–2013	(2nd actress in the role); Temporary assistance at "Steinkamp Sports and Wellness" and the club "A40"; daughter of Ingo and Céline; niece of Marie; ex-girlfriend of Can; one-night-stand of Ben and Deniz; went to South Africa
Ulrich Drewes	Rüdiger Steinkamp	1476–1678	2012–2013	(2nd actor in the role); Manager of "Steinkamp Sports and Wellness"; father of Franziska; brother of Richard; uncle of Jenny, Vanessa, Ben, Marco and Nikolas; ex-boyfriend of Monika; one-night-stand of Simone; was sent to prison on account of extortion and kidnapping
Salvatore Greco	Jan Marco Schöler	1260–1761	2011–2013	Dance instructor at Simone's dance studio, then at "Steinkamp Dance Factory"; son of Monika and Richard; half-brother of Jenny, Vanessa, Ben and Nikolas; nephew of Rüdiger; cousin of Franziska; ex-lover of Jenny, Sarah and Isabelle; went to Rome
Maria Kempken	Lena Bergmann	1612–1770	2013	(2nd actress in the role, temporary replacement for Juliette Greco who was on maternity leave)
Daniel Aichinger	Dr. Axel Schwarz	1–331; 554–847; 971–1443; 1810–1881	2006–2007; 2008−2009; 2010−2012; 2013–2014	Former controller of "Steinkamp Sports & Wellness", also worked for the Ministry of the Interior as the State Commissioner for the High-Performance Centre in Essen; son of Luna and Hans Josef; ex-husband of Jenny; ex-lover of Simone and Nina; fled to Greece as "Costa Papadopoulos" after another scheme went wrong; has returned to Essen with a diplomatic pass, killed Ingo to set up the Steinkamps for the murder and break away back to Greece with his accomplice and new wife Spiridula
Carlo Degen	Joscha Degen	1698–1895	2013–2014	Footballer; son of David; brother of Lukas; half-brother of Annabelle; sham-husband of Raquel; boyfriend of Kai; ex-boyfriend of Melanie; left with Kai
Alexander Gier	Dr. Kai Seebach	1820–1909	2013–2014	Sports doctor; son of Barbara; boyfriend of Joscha; leaves Essen with Joscha
Marc Schöttner	Lukas Levin	1658–1923	2013–2014	Student at "Steinkamp Dance Factory"; son of David; brother of Joscha; half-brother of Annabelle; ex-boyfriend of Julia; ex-lover of Letizia; went to New York to complete three semester abroad there
Andreas Hofer	David M. Degen	1628–1933	2013–2014	Choreographer at "Steinkamp Dance Factory"; father of Lukas and Joscha; ex-fiancé of Simone; ex-lover of Barbara; one-night-stand of Jenny; father of Annabelle (with Jenny); leaves Essen after kidnapping Annabelle and losing the custody for her
Sam Eisenstein	Marian Öztürk	2–1934	2006–2014	Proprietor of "No. 7" (café and bar), formerly ran the inline-courier service "Get It" and had a shady past as a safecracker; son of Melek; father of Deniz (with ex-wife Veronika); grandfather of Jonas; uncle of Can; ex-husband of Lena (married for immigration reasons and subsequently began dating); ex-boyfriend of Nadja and Jessica; ex-lover of Jenny; went back to Ağın to provide for his mother who is suffering from cancer
Hannes Sell	Felix Landeck	1935–2031	2014	Student at "Steinkamp Dance Factory"; son of Rolf; ex-lover of Isabelle; one-night-stand of Letizia and Raquel; went to a dance academy in Zwickau
Anna-Katharina Fecher	Melanie Wendt	1238–1480; 1713–2040	2011–2012; 2013–2014	Teenager whose parents perished in the 2004 tsunami; placed with foster parents Annette and Ingo; works in reception at the Centre; sister of Sarah; ex-girlfriend of Deniz and Joscha; one-night-stand of Maximilian; leaves Essen to find vocational and personal happiness in Hamburg
Jennifer Dessin-Brasching	Letizia von Altenburg, accepted, née Kaldenhoff †	1644–2058	2013–2014	Student at "Steinkamp Dance Factory"; daughter of Janaina and Maximilian; grandchild of Simone; great-grandchild of Friederike; niece of Jenny and Vanessa; great-niece of Carmen; great-cousin of Michelle; ex-lover of Lukas; one-night-stand of Deniz and Felix; bleed to death by a shot of her father's nemesis Rafael Suarez
Alexander Wüst	Erik Schulte †	1924–2101	2014–2015	Inspector; father of Emilia; ex-husband of Tina; fell from a castle tower (by Richard's fault) during his wedding day
Jenny Bach	Julia Meyer †	1639–2106	2013–2015	Student at "Steinkamp Dance Factory"; daughter of Helga; sister of Bea; girlfriend of Ben; ex-girlfriend of Lukas; died in a bus crash
Yara Hassan	Raquel Degen, née Santana †	1778–2106	2013–2015	Student at "Steinkamp Dance Factory"; widow of Joscha (sham marriage); one-night-stand of Felix and Ben; died in a bus crash
Michèle Fichtner	Antonia "Toni" Fuchs †	2036–2106	2014–2015	Student at "Steinkamp Dance Factory"; died in a bus crash
Naima Fehrenbacher	Larissa Schuhmann	2044–2111	2014–2015	Student at "Steinkamp Dance Factory"; daughter of ??? Schuhmann and Philipp Reichenbach; half-sister of Isabelle and Tom; went to Munich
Anna-Katharina Samsel	Katja Bergmann	822–2209	2009–2015	Former figure skater at "Steinkamp Sports and Wellness"; daughter of Claudia and Peter; half-sister of Annette and Lena; cousin of Ronny; aunt of Maximilian; with Roman as her trainer, took third place at the Essen Cup shortly after signing on to the Steinkamp team; ex-girlfriend of Tom, Ben, Maximilian and Can; one-night-stand of Deniz; went to Augsburg
Volkan Isbert	Can Öztürk	1590–2216	2012–2015	Bouncer at the club "A40", owner of "Multi-Friends"; nephew of Marian; cousin of Deniz (had sexual preferences to him); grandchild of Melek; ex-boyfriend of Zoé, Susi and Katja; went to Turkey to present a game show
Julia Albrecht	Florentine "Flo" Brück	2105–2352	2015–2016	Student; daughter of Sonja and Thomas; sister of Leo; girlfriend of Paul; one-night-stand of Kevin; went on ahead to Berlin due to a problem in her and Sonja's new flat
Barbara Sotelsek	Sonja Brück, née Kampe	2105–2353	2015–2016	Cleaning lady at "Multi-Friends", trainer at "Steinkamp Sports & Wellness"; mother of Leo and Flo; ex-wife of Thomas; went to Berlin to assume a new job as gymnastics leotard
Isabell Horn	Pia Koch	2113–2363	2015–2016	DJane, partner of "Multi-Friends"; ex-wife of John; ex-girlfriend of Veit; one-night-stand of Tobi and Iva; frequently pet named "Diesel Dyke" by her friends; left Essen for a job on Ibiza
Caroline Frier	Beatrice "Bea" Meyer	1503–2378	2012–2016	Owner of "PommesSchranke", partner of "Multi-Friends"; daughter of Helga; sister of Julia; ex-wife of Ben; ex-girlfriend of Felix; ex-lover of Deniz; left Essen on account of her pregnancy by Ben to pay regard to his relationship with Iva
Carsten Clemens	Veit Hartmann aka Fabian Rother	2169–2433	2015–2016	Controller of "Steinkamp Sports & Wellness"; husband of Jenny; ex-boyfriend of Emma and Pia; one-night-stand of Brigitte; get arrested for misappropriation of funds
Judith Neumann	Marie Schmidt	2280–2465	2015–2016	(1st actress in the role)
Michael Jassin	Tobias "Tobi" Märtz	2138–2140; 2228–2544	2015–2016	Bank clerk, partner of "Pumpwerk"; boyfriend of Kerstin; ex-boyfriend of Marie; one-night-stand of Pia; went to Salzburg after hearing that Kerstin is pregnant by him
Julian Bayer	Leo Brück	2305–2654	2015–2017	Male nurse; son of Sonja and Thomas; brother of Flo; ex-boyfriend of Marie; one-night-stand of Isabelle and Michelle, left for Brasil with a fake identity provided by Maximilian, after being chased by the police for delivering heroin for Vincent
Francisco Medina	Maximilian von Altenburg aka Maximilian Santiago de Castillo	280–1798; 2064–2150; 2605	2007–2013; 2014–2015; 2017	Manager of "Steinkamp Sports & Wellness"; son of Simone; half-brother of Jenny and Vanessa; father of Letizia (by ex-girlfriend Janaina), Alexander (with Lena) and Sophia (with Isabelle); cousin of Juli and Michelle; nephew of Carmen; ex-husband Juli (convenience marriage), Céline, Lena and Isabelle; ex-boyfriend of Katja; ex-lover of Jenny; one-night-stand of Melanie; was convict erroneously for Erik's death and also for extortive abduction and attempted murder of Richard (at present prisoner on day-release), fled after his parole officer was killed in a fight with him and Vincent, with the latter putting evidence falsely pointing on him
Daniel Brockhaus	Dr. Thomas Brück	2107–2708	2015–2017	Head doctor; father of Leo and Flo; ex-husband of Sonja; ex-boyfriend of Isabelle; ex-lover of Dana and Lena; one-night-stand of Anne and Brigitte. Left for a job in Berlin and to be near his daughter Flo.
Robert Maaser	Tim Hayer	2639–2761	2017	Extreme BMX-biker, testimonial of Jenny and Deniz' "Pumpwerk"-campaign, fake-boyfriend of Michelle, affair of Isabelle, one-night-stand of Marie, later her boyfriend, husband of Lotte, with whom he left for Canada
Christina Klein	Iva Lukowski	2036–2796	2014–2017	DJane, singer; daughter of Christoph; step-daughter of Vanessa; half-sister of Henry; ex-girlfriend of Ben; one-night-stand of Pia and rapper Third Unit, left for a DJ job on Bali

== Directors ==
AWZ is directed in week-long blocks with revolving directors, including Christof Brehmer, Stefan Bühling, Gudrun Scherer, Jörg Mielich, Tina Kriwitz, Klaus Knoesel, Annette Herre, Matthias Paul and Andreas Stenschke, to name just a very few.

== Broadcast ==
Country	Network	Title
Germany	RTL Television; RTL Passion	Alles was zählt
Belgium	Plug RTL	Le Rêve de Diana
Canada	Séries+	Le Rêve de Diana
France	M6; Téva; NRJ 12; NRJ Paris Game One	Le Rêve de Diana
Poland	TV Puls	To, co najważniejsze
Switzerland	TSR 1 TSR 2	Le Rêve de Diana
