= Lale Karci =

German actress and model (born 1969)

- Born: 15 December 1969 (age 56); Wipperfürth, Germany
- Years active: 1994–present

Lale Karci (born 15 November 1969) is a German actress and model.

== Filmography ==
=== Television ===
Year	Film	Role	Notes
2001	Verbotene Liebe		
1999	Hinter Gittern - Der Frauenknast	Ayse Manculi	
1999	Der Solist – Kein Weg zurück		
1994–1998	Unter uns	Aylin Eray	
