= Kristin Meyer =

German actress (born 1974)

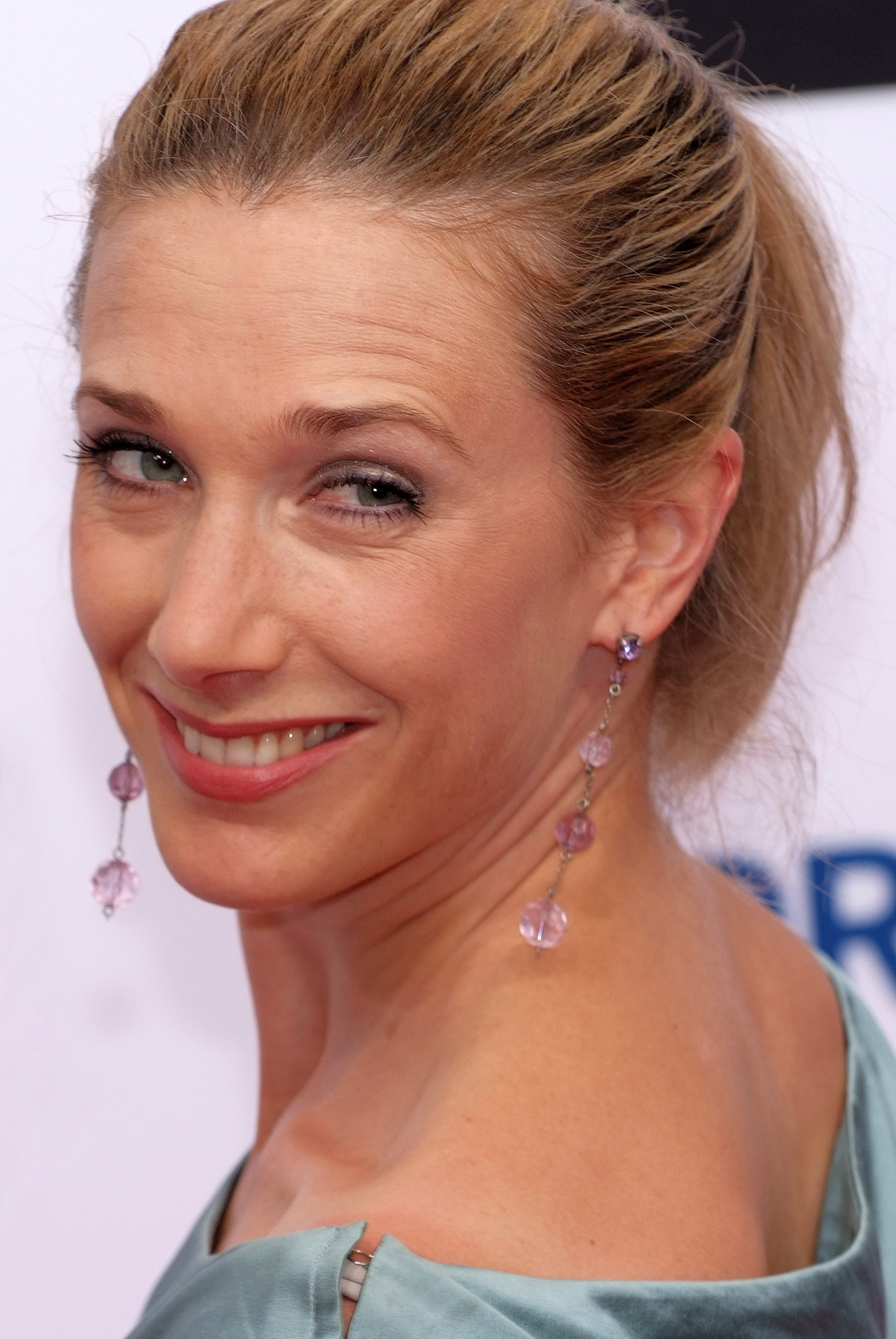
- Born: 27 June 1974 (age 51); Dortmund
- Occupations: Television actress Film actress
- Years active: 2000–present

Kristin Meyer (born 27 June 1974 in Dortmund) is a German actress.

== Career ==
Meyer studied acting and singing at the University of Music and Theatre Leipzig. From 2001 to 2005, she acted in several theaters in Germany, where she notably played classical leading roles such as Elisabeth in Shakespeare's Richard III.

From 2007 to 2010, she played the role of Iris Coster in the soap opera Gute Zeiten, schlechte Zeiten. She also played Romy in the series Ein Fall für Nadja.

She is married to film director, actor and dubbing actor Patrick Winczewski. After staying in Saxony and Bavaria, she now lives in Berlin.

Since 2010, Kristin Meyer has been supporting the orphanage St. Moses Children's Care Centre in Uganda.

During the 2017 German federal election campaign, Meyer endorsed the Social Democratic Party and its top candidate Martin Schulz. Meyer is an ambassador of Björn Steiger Foundation and a project godmother of the Baby-Notarztwagen.

== Filmography ==
- 2000: Polizeiruf 110 – Blutiges Eis (TV series)
- 2000: Tatort – Quartett in Leipzig (TV series)
- 2000: In aller Freundschaft (TV series)
- 2001: Wolffs Revier (TV series)
- 2006: Der Gast (short film)
- 2007: Ein Fall für Nadja (TV series)
- 2007: Küstenwache (TV series)
- 2007–2010: Gute Zeiten, schlechte Zeiten (TV series)
- 2008: SOKO Wismar (TV series)
- 2008: Hallo Robbie! (TV series)
- 2010: Da kommt Kalle (TV series)
- 2011: SOKO 5113 (TV series)
- 2011: Leipzig Homicide (TV series)
- 2012: Schloss Einstein (TV series)
- 2012: Anna und die Liebe (TV series)
- 2012: Nur wer die Sehnsucht kennt (short film)
- 2012: Der Kriminalist (TV series)
- 2014: Tatort – Winternebel
- seit 2014: Ein Fall von Liebe (TV series)
- 2016–2017: Unter uns (TV series)
- 2019: Zoo Doctor: My Mom the Vet (TV series)
