= Andreas Hofer (actor) =

German actor

- Born: 19 May 1962 (age 64); Osnabrück, West Germany
- Occupation: Actor
- Years active: 1987-present

Andreas Hofer (born 19 May 1962) is a German film actor. He appeared in more than forty films since 1987.

== Selected filmography ==
Film
Year	Title	Role	Notes
2002	Baader		
2002	Summertime Heroes		

TV
Year	Title	Role	Notes
1997	Alarm für Cobra 11 – Die Autobahnpolizei		
2007	Türkisch für Anfänger		
2009	Löwenzahn		
2009-2010	Alisa – Folge deinem Herzen		
2013-2014	Alles was zählt		
