= Unter uns =

German television series

- Genre: Teen drama; Soap opera; Comedy drama
- Created by: Ray Kolle; Jörg Brückner
- Starring: Petra Blossey; Isabell Hertel; Miloš Vuković
- Country of origin: Germany
- Original language: German
- No. of episodes: 8,000

Production
- Running time: 25 minutes

Original release
- Network: RTL
- Release: 28 November 1994

Unter uns ("Among Us") is a German television soap opera, first broadcast on RTL on 28 November 1994. It is centered on the lives of the people in a residential house, which is set in the fictional 'Schillerallee' in Cologne. Since the show debuted, the baker's family Weigel is the series core family. Unter uns is not based on a foreign soap opera like Verbotene Liebe or Gute Zeiten, schlechte Zeiten. After Gute Zeiten, schlechte Zeiten, the show was the second daily soap for RTL, followed years later in 2006 by Alles was zählt. The show aired its 7,000th episode on 22 November 2022.

== Cast ==
=== Current cast members ===
Actor	Character	Episode	Duration
Petra Blossey	Irene Weigel, née Schwarz	1–	1994–
Isabell Hertel	Ute Fink, née Kiefer	55–	1995–
Miloš Vuković	Paco Weigel	1344–	2000–
Ben Ruedinger	Tilmann "Till" Weigel #2	1442–	2000–
Claudelle Deckert	Eva Wagner	1586–2905; 3102–3128; 3415–	2001–2006; 2007; 2008–
Kai Noll	Rufus Sturm	2037–	2003–
Lars Steinhöfel	Ingo "Easy" Winter	2590–	2005–
Patrick Müller	Tobias Lassner	2985–	2006–
Tabea Heynig	Britta Schönfeld	3762–	2010–
Valea Katharina Scalabrino	Sina Hirschberger, née Uhland	3820–	2010–
Timothy Boldt	Richard "Ringo" Beckmann	4422–	2012–
Benjamin Heinrich	Benno "Bambi" Hirschberger	4640–	2013–
Luca Maric	Robert Küpper	5017–	2015–
Nora Koppen	Elli Schneider	5188–	2015–
Aaron Koszuta	Valentin Huber	5340–	2016–
Jens Hajek	Benedikt Huber	5369–	2016–
Astrid Leberti	Andrea Huber #2	5589–	2017–
Antonia Michalsky	Saskia Weigel	5646–	2017–
Andrea Brix	Roswitha Küpper-Pütz	5670–	2017– (previously recurring)
Alexander Milo	Jakob Huber	5688–	2017–
Linda König	Larissa Huber	5834–	2018–

=== Past cast members ===
A † indicates characters that have died.

Actor	Character	Duration
Cobus Gomes	Uwe	2001–2002
Milena Dreißig	Antonia "Toni" Schwarz #1	1994–1995
Ludwig Hollburg	Olaf Schwarz	1994–1995
Karin Schröder	Sophie Himmel #1	1994–1995
Katja Frenzel-Röhl	Melanie Hoffmeister	1994–1995
Björn Kegel-Casapietra	Armin Franke †	1994–1996
Sebastian Feicht	Alexander Albrecht	1994–1996
Stephen Dürr	Tilmann "Till" Weigel #1	1994–1996
Andreas Köss	Lars König	1995–1997
Alexander Osteroth	Joachim Albrecht	1994–1997
Nina Azizi	Antonia "Toni" Schwarz #2	1995–1997
Beate Wanke	Regina Albrecht †	1994–1997
Oliver Bootz	Christian "Chris" Weigel	1994–1997
Cecilia Kunz	Corinna Bach	1994–1997
Tilmann Schillinger	Bernd Hoffmeister †	1995–1997
Lale Karci	Aylin Hoffmeister, née Eray	1994–1998
Marco Girnth	Sven Rusinek	1995–1998
Tatiani Katrantzi	Jennifer "Jenny" Turner	1994–1998
Maurice Karl †	Sebastian Sandmann #1	1997–1998
Bodo Frank	Marc Albrecht	1994–1998
Sebastian Winkler	Sebastian Sandmann #2	1998–1999
Ralf Komorr	Andreas Sandmann †	1997–1999
Verena Zimmermann	Jessica Falkenberg †	1997–1999
Vanessa Glinka	Alexandra "Alexa" Falkenberg	1997–1999
Eric Benz	Nick Weigel, adopted, né Neuhaus	1997–2000
Wolfram Grandezka	Roman Klingenberg	1998–2000
Isabel Florido	Ilona "Lona Dee" Dertinger	1995–2000
Arnold Dammann	Viktor Falkenberg †	1997–2000
André Dietz	Gregor Sandmann	1997–2000
Thorsten Feller	Kai Fleming	1998–2000
Diana Staehly	Susanne "Sue" Sommerfeld	1998–2000
Eve Scheer	Sarah Foster, née Engel	1999–2001
Michael Evans	Thomas "Tom" Foster	1997–2001
Sylvia Agnes Muc	Laura Böhme	1994–2001
Ole Tillmann	Jonas Sommerfeld	1999–2001
Tobias Licht	Gideon Kern †	2000–2001
Claudia Neidig	Claudia Falkenberg	1997–2001
Wayne Carpendale	Maximilian "Max" Pfitzer	2000–2001
Bianca Hein	Meike Wagner	2000–2002
Cobus Gomes	Fabian Rose †	2001–2002
Petra Gumpold	Isabelle "Belle" Rose, née Minz †	2001–2002
Timo Ben Schöfer	Stefan Kramer	2000–2003
Gabriele Weinspach	Helena Kramer, née Lasalle	2000–2004
Mario Kristl	David Kramer †	2001–2003
Sabine Pfeifer	Pauline Pfitzer	1999–2003
Melanie Wichterich	Viktoria "Vicky" Kramer	2000–2004
Janis Rattenni	Anna Weigel #1	1994–2004
Finja Martens	Svenja Lindström	2004–2005
Nike Martens	Romy Sturm #1	2003–2005
Tanja Szewczenko	Katinka "Kati" Ritter †	2002–2005
Christiane Maybach †	Margot Weigel, née Himmel †	1994–2006
Sven Waasner	René Sturm †	2003–2006
Henrike Richters	Kimberly "Kim" Ritter	2004–2006
Torben Brinkmann	Oliver Twist	2005–2006
Petra Gumpold	Dr. Ariane Sturm, née Minz	2003–2006
Annika Peimann	Lara Martensen †	2006–2007
Alexander Sholti	Björn Winter †	2001–2008
Arissa Ferkic	Silke Seebach	2006–2008
Olivia Klemke	Franziska Gellert	2005–2009
Yvonne de Bark	Dr. Pia Lassner	2006–2009
Andreas Büngen	Jan Gräser	2002–2009
Sarah Ulrich	Romy Sturm #2	2005–2009
Holger Franke	Wolfgang Weigel †	1994–2009
Jane Hempel	Sophie Himmel-Eiler, née Himmel #2	2001–2009
Anna-Julia Kapfelsperger	Charlotte Sommer	2008–2010
Andreas Zimmermann	Henning Fink #1	2009–2010
Marcel Saibert	Martin "Mars" Sommer	2004–2010
Kathleen Fiedler	Anna Weigel #2	2006–2010
Birte Glang	Heidi Danne †	2010–2011
Imke Brügger	Rebecca Mattern †	1997–2012
Sarah Bogen	Lili Mattern	2001–2012
Martin Baden	Nils Hoffmann	2011–2012
Ela Paul	Sabine "Bine" Kern	2011–2012
Mine Voss	Suji Wagner #1	2012–2013
Laura Maria Heid	Suji Wagner #2	2013
Maximilian Claus	Erik Hansen	2011–2013
Bela Klentze	Bela Hoffmann	2011–2013
Sarah Stork	Leonie Weidenfeld #1	2013
Anne Apitzsch	Dr. Sonja Beckmann, née Weidenfeld †	2012–2014
Eric Langner	Paul Beckmann †	2012–2014
Marylu-Saskia Poolman	Anna Weigel #3	2010–2014
Barbara Prakopenka	Kira Beckmann	2012–2014
Svenja Jung	Lisa Brück	2014–2015
Sarah Hannemann	Josephine "Joe" Johlke	2013–2015
Maja Lehrer	Kimberley Pötter	2014–2015
Joy Lee Juana Abiola-Müller	Michelle "Micki" Lassner, née Fink	2009–2015
Alexander Sholti	Dr. Sascha Brenner	2013–2015
Maria Kempken	Leonie Weidenfeld #2	2014–2015
Marvin Linke	Moritz Schönfeld	2010–2016
Benjamin Kiss	Henning Fink #2	2010–2016
Stefan Franz	Rolf Jäger †	2002–2016
Olivia Burkhart	Fiona Jäger, accepted, née Fischer	2015–2016
Amrei Haardt	Jule Kasper	2015–2016
Kristin Meyer	Andrea Huber	2016–2017
Stefan Bockelmann	Malte Winter	2001–2017
Ines Kurenbach	Caro Kasper	2014–2017
Aaron Koszuta	Valentin Huber	2016–2017
Pauline Angert	KayC Schneider	2016–2018

== Crossovers ==
Over the years, Unter uns had three crossovers with other television shows.

- In 1997, the character of Rebecca Mattern (played by Imke Brügger) had several crossover appearances with the crime drama SK-Babies.
- On 25 October 2007, Unter uns started the first crossover of two German soaps. The characters of Nina Sommer (played by Nathalie Thiede), Tim Herzog (played by André Emanuel Kaminski) and Vanessa Steinkamp (played by Julia Augustin) from Alles was zählt crossed over and visited the beach bar Übersee. This was followed by a guest appearance of the character Mars (played by Marcel Saibert) on 5 November 2007 on Alles was zählt.
- In three episodes from 17 to 23 January 2008, Unter uns had a crossover with the scripted crime show Staatsanwalt Posch ermittelt. For that Christopher Posch made guest appearances to convince the character of Franziska Gellert (played by Olivia Klemke) to testify against her kidnapper Herrig.
