= Colonel Robert Morris =

American singer

Robert Neill Morris, known professionally as Colonel Robert Morris, (December 12, 1954 – October 21, 2013) was an American musician, drummer, singer and songwriter. He was also known as "The Man with the Golden Pen".

Morris was best known for playing drums for Charlie Feathers, and writing and performing the gold record "Trucker’s Last Ride".

== Early life ==
Robert Morris was born in 1954 in Whitehaven, Memphis, into a musical environment. His father was a "flat-top" guitarist and a musical associate of Bill Monroe. Monroe came often to visit the Morris family, which also influenced Robert early. Another of his father's acquaintances was Elvis Presley, with whom young Robert once spent a day boating on a nearby lake. His mother died when he was twelve years old.

== Career ==
Morris started playing drums in Memphis clubs early and was connected to the Memphis blues and helped in creating the "Memphis Sound". During his Memphis Blues days he played with Eddie Bond, B.B. King, Rufus Thomas, Ma Rainey, Little Laura Dukes, Big Sam Clarke and many others. He played regularly at the Shanti Inn in Memphis. He also performed at the Eddie Bond Live Radio Show at the Western Steakhouse Lounge, also in Memphis. Later he played drums for Jerry Lee Lewis, Ronnie Milsap, Charlie Rich and nearly five years for Charlie Feathers. It also was the time when he recorded at Memphis' Sun Studios.

== 1980s ==
In 1988, the Finnish rock band Leningrad Cowboys produced their movie, Leningrad Cowboys Go America, which led them directly to Memphis, Tennessee. At this time Morris and his wife Irene owned the "Lonesome Bar" which was used for a scene in the movie. They both have a cameo role in that scene, though they were listed as Mr. and Mrs. Morris in the credits.

Also in the 1980s, Morris recorded material with Cordell Jackson on her own label. At the Memphis Fall Fest he also shared stage with a young Justin Timberlake, who sang Hank Williams songs wearing a cowboy hat.

== Songwriting ==
In the 1990s, he seriously started to write songs when he heard about a story about the Doug Maten, a trucker who died of cancer. It was Maten's last wish to be taken to his grave in his rig. His co-workers fulfilled this dream and a convoy of one mile led him – lying on a flatbed trailer - to his grave. Morris was so touched of this story that he decided to write "Trucker's Last Ride". The song went gold and Morris was honored with the key to the City of Memphis and the Lifetime Achievement Award from the Memphis Music Heritage Foundation for his merits.

In 1998, he received the honorary title of "Colonel aide-de-camp" from Don Sundquist, the then governor of the state of Tennessee. Since then he was known as Colonel Robert Morris or often just as "The Colonel". After that Morris was presented with The Mississippi State Governor's Award, Tennessee State Governor's Award and was inducted in the Rockabilly Hall of Fame and the Traditional Country Hall of Fame. He also is a regularly inductee in the Who's Who in America.

== 2000s and death ==
In 2008, he published the trucking album, Highway Hero, on his own label, which also contains his song "Trucker’s Last Ride". On August 24–25, 2013, he finally shot a music video for "Trucker’s Last Ride". The music video was published online two months later on CMT / MTV and YouTube.

TM Garret, who worked with Morris since 2004, took over his legacy and his independent label Silver Dollar Music, and keeps working with songs and artists that have been discovered by Morris, such as Dani Fouts, who recorded his song "NASCAR Fan" and which charted at iTunes at number 26 the first week. The song was co-produced by TM Garret and former guitarist for Josh Turner and Clint Black, Bryan Austin.

Another Morris song that hit the market in 2014 was "Country Born, American Made", a song about Mark Muller, who starred in God, Guns & Automobiles on History Channel in 2013. The song was recorded by country artist Jimmy Miles for Mid South Music Records.

== Death ==
Colonel Robert Morris died at October 21, 2013, at Baptist Memorial Hospital in Southaven, Mississippi, due to long-term effects of a heart attack he suffered in 2008.

He is survived by his wife Irene, his nephew Clifford and two sisters.
