= Birte Glang =

German actress

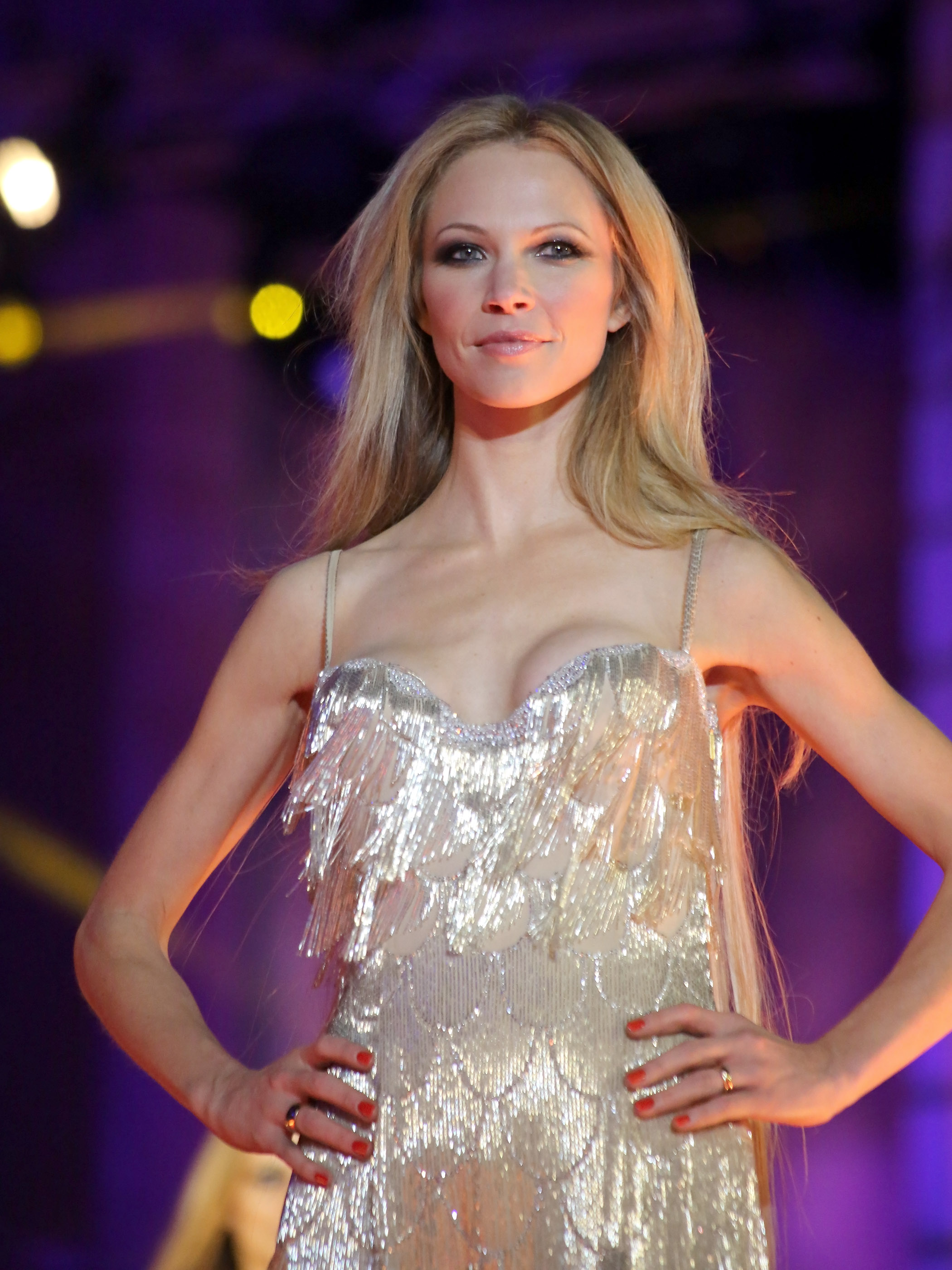
- Glang in 2013
- Born: 15 April 1980 (age 46); Recklinghausen, Germany
- Education: Ruhr University Bochum
- Occupations: Actress, brand ambassador, fashion model
- Spouse: Moguai (m. 2008)
- Website: birteglang.com

Birte Glang (born 15 April 1980) is a German actress, brand ambassador, and fashion model. She started her career as a series regular on the award winning TV soap opera Unter uns. In 2012, she starred in the German James Bond parody Agent Ranjid rettet die Welt. In 2014, she was booked for a film with the comedian Nick Offerman.

== Early life ==
The daughter of two teachers is the youngest of three siblings. Glang received her high school diploma (Abitur) from the Willy-Brandt-Gymnasium in Oer-Erkenschwick, Germany. She went on to study law at the Ruhr University Bochum. During her studies, Glang supported herself by working as a model, booking jobs in Milan, Barcelona, Istanbul, Paris, Los Angeles and Vienna. In 2003, she received a Fashion TV Model Award nomination for 'Best Upcoming Model'.

After receiving her law degree in 2006, Glang decided to trade in her lawyer robes for a career as a professional actress. Inspired by roles she booked as a model in TV commercials and music videos, she began taking private acting, speech and voice lessons. She continues to study acting with coaches in Berlin and Los Angeles.

== Career ==
=== Television ===
Glang began her TV career with supporting roles in German TV series and films in 2007. In 2009, this led to a leading role in the popular series Unter uns. She appeared in nearly 300 episodes. During her two-year stint on the show, she also appeared on covers of several fashion and TV magazines.

Glang appeared in TV films highlighted by the 2009 German historical drama Schicksalsjahr, where she co-starred alongside lead actress Maria Furtwängler. In 2010, she appeared in Sony Pictures' tragic-comedy The Great Comeback with German actors Uwe Ochsenknecht and Andrea Sawatzki. The TV film was nominated for the Adolf Grimme Award.

In 2016, Glang starred in Was kostet die Liebe – Ein Großstadtmärchen, the German comedic version of the fairytale Cinderella, which was broadcast on Sat.1.

=== Film ===
In 2011, Glang left her television show for the pursue a film career. Six months later, she was cast for the lead in Constantin Film's action comedy Agent Ranjid rettet die Welt. In the film, she plays the assistant-in-crime of villain Rutger Hauer and the love interest of Kaya Yanar. She also produced and starred in a short film about the need for organ donations. Im Himmel braucht man kein Gepäck ("You Don't Need Luggage in Heaven") was shown as a public service announcement during the preview of feature films in German theaters. It has won several awards, for instance the "Golden Delphin" at the Cannes Cooperate Media & TV Awards 2013, and is in regular television circulation. Since the beginning of 2019, Glang was a recast in the role of Lena Öztürk in the RTL series Alles was zählt, after actress Juliette Greco could no longer continue to embody the role.

=== Modeling ===
In 2006, Glang agreed to a four-year worldwide campaign for Audi Quattro. She appeared in ad campaigns for Pierre Cardin, for Italian clothing line Prima Donna, Oriflame, and German sports nutrition company Multipower Sportsfood. Since 2013, she has an endorsement deal with 'Cellagon' and 'Cellagon Cosmetics'. In April 2019, Glang was on the cover of Playboy.

=== Commercials ===
In 2000, she was cast for her first television commercial for Esso. Since then, she has appeared in many commercials, like Persil, Bitburger, and Ergo.

=== Philosophy and philanthropy ===
Glang is a spokesperson for green living. She hosted Miss Eco 2011 in Hamburg, the "GREENshowroom" in Berlin 2012, and has appeared as a presenter for the Fairtrade Award.

In 2010, she participated in a fundraiser for children-in-need that was broadcast on RTL Television. Since January 2011, she has been an official ambassador for the German Organ Transplantation Foundation (DSO). In 2012, Glang was made a special ambassador for the organization "Für's Leben – Für Organspende" ("For Life – For Organ Donation"), a charity of the DSO.

=== In the media ===
Glang has appeared on the covers of FHM, TV Digital, BeStyled, TV Guide, TV 4x7, and TV Direkt. She has also been featured in Elle, Woman, In, OK!, InStyle, Linea Intima, and Viva.

== Personal life ==
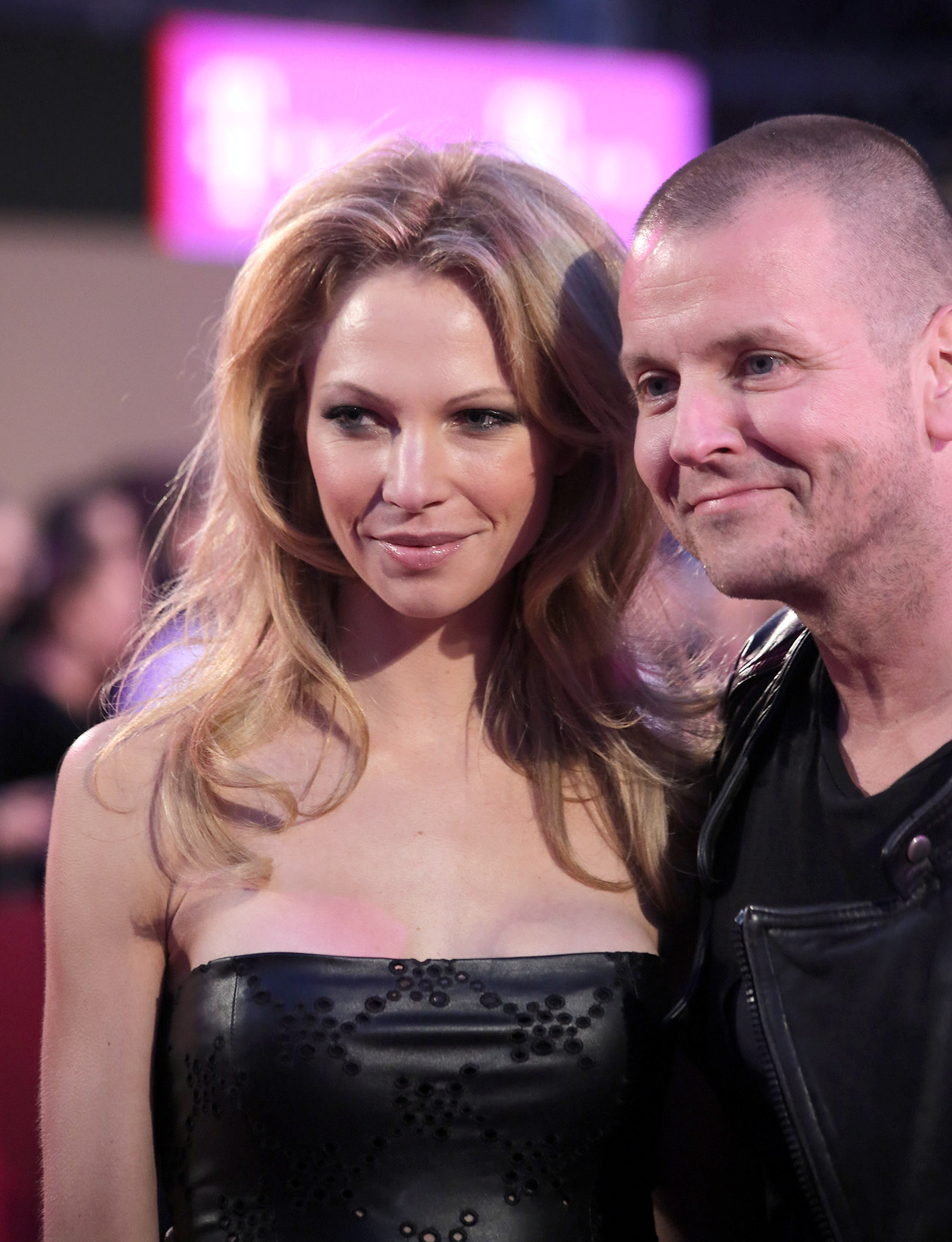
Glang with Moguai at the Life Ball in 2013

Glang married music producer Moguai in 2008. They live in North Rhine-Westphalia, Berlin and Los Angeles.

== Filmography (selection) ==
=== Films ===
- 2012: Agent Ranjid rettet die Welt
- 2012: Im Himmel braucht man kein Gepäck ("You Don't Need Luggage in Heaven")

=== Television ===
- 2006: Verbotene Liebe (TV series), ARD
- 2008: Mannsbilder (comedy show), Sat.1
- 2008: Schimanski (TV series), ARD
- 2009: Cologne P.D. (TV series), ZDF
- 2010: Schicksalsjahre (TV mini series), ZDF
- 2010: The Great Comeback (TV film), ZDF
- 2010: Alarm für Cobra 11 (TV series), RTL
- 2010–2011: Unter uns (TV series), (287 episodes), RTL
- 2011: Anna und die Liebe (TV series), Sat.1
- 2012: Alarm für Cobra 11 (TV series), RTL
- 2012: Cologne P.D. (TV series), ZDF
- 2012: Cindy & die jungen Wilden (comedy show), RTL
- 2012: Pastewka (comedy series), Sat.1
- 2012: Der Ballermann – Ein Bulle auf Mallorca (TV film), RTL
- 2013: SOKO Wismar (TV series), ZDF
- 2014: Bülent Ceylan & seine Freunde (Comedyshow), RTL
- 2015: Stuttgart Homicide (TV series), ZDF
- 2016: Was kostet die Liebe? – Ein Großstadtmärchen (TV film), SAT.1
- 2017: Alarm für Cobra 11 (TV series), RTL

=== Commercials ===
- 2000: Esso
- 2005–2006: Sunpoint
- 2006: Pearle "Besser sehen"
- 2009: Inku
- 2009: Persil "Baby Skin"
- 2010: Bitburger
- 2011: ERGO

=== Short films/web series ===
- 2006: "She's so" (Tobias Regner), music clip
- 2008: "Hunger", short film
- 2008: "Elevator", short film
- 2009: "Big Black Crow" (Kai Noll), music clip
- 2010: "Dance Like You", dance short film
- 2010: "Red Mind", web crime series
- 2012: "Im Himmel braucht man kein Gepäck", ("In Heaven You Don't Need Luggage), short film
- 2014: "Make Me Better", short film
