= Anna-Katharina Samsel =

German actress (born 1985)

- Born: 12 April 1985 (age 39); Hanover, West Germany
- Website: www.annakatharinasamsel.com

Anna-Katharina Samsel (born 12 April 1985, in Hanover) is a German actress.

Samsel grew up in Wolfsburg where she completed her Abitur. In 1999 she became the German artistic roller skating champion and won the World Championships in 1999, 2000 and 2002.

She appeared in the music video of Coldplay's 2008 single "Lost!", and has played the role of Katja Bergmann in the RTL soap opera Alles was zählt since December 2009.

Samsel now lives in Cologne. Her first appearance was in a short film Epicalypse Now by Daryush Shokof.
