= Andreas Stenschke =

German actor and director

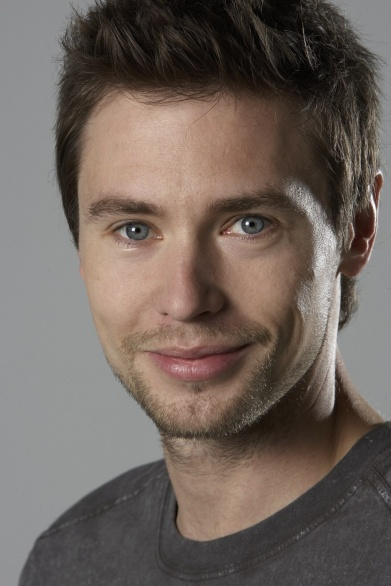
- Born: Andreas Stenschke; July 26, 1975 (age 50); Cologne, West Germany
- Occupation: Actor/Director/Writer
- Years active: 1997–
- Website: http://www.andreas-stenschke.de/

Andreas Stenschke (born 26 July 1975), is a German actor and director.

== Biography ==
Stenschke was born in Cologne, West Germany and moved shortly to the nearby suburbs, where his parents, Wolfgang and Marlene, had bought a home. He has a younger brother, Christian, born in March 1980. Andreas was educated at the Gymnasium in Erftstadt Lechenich and graduated in 1995. He later received a degree in television series producing and directing from the Filmakademie Baden-Württemberg in March 2006.

From an early age he was drawn to cinema and won several prizes as a youthful filmmaker, including one in 1996, which, among the rewards, sent him to the Atlanta Olympics, where he sent back video reports to the WDR. He also worked intermittently as a teen-age model in pictorial layouts.

After fulfilling his national service obligation at a senior citizen home in 1995 and 1996, he attempted various pursuits in production when, during a visit to the WDR Studios in 1997, he was discovered in the commissary by the head writer of Verbotene Liebe, which led to an audition for the show.

== Actor ==
At the age of 21, the six foot actor was thus cast as Ulrich (Ulli) Prozeski.

After three and a half years and 342 episodes on Verbotene Liebe, Stenschke left the series and recorded a CD single, Just When I Needed You Most.

In 2001, he applied for and was accepted among 800 entrants for admission to the prestigious Filmakademie Baden-Württemberg in Ludwigsburg. At the same time, he had guest starred on a weekly serial, Die Anrheiner, and was then asked to join the regular cast, taking the role of Ben Merker.

In the course of his four years at film school, he directed several films, received his diploma and then continued his role on Die Anrheiner, ultimately leaving the series in 2008 after completing 133 episodes.

== Director ==
During his breaks from Die Anrheiner in 2006, Stenschke began his apprenticeship as a director, first serving as assistant director on Der perfekte Urlaub, a reality show shot in tourist locales, and then got an opportunity as A.D. on the critically successful show Pastewka.

In 2007, he was hired for his first directorial assignment, a crime drama, Staatsanwalt Posch ermittelt, produced by Filmpool and broadcast on the RTL Television network.

Stenschke was then asked to direct a cooking competition show, Unter Volldampf!, produced by Granada and broadcast on VOX. In a year and a half, Stenschke helmed 115 episodes.

From November 2009 as of the close of 2011, Stenschke prepared to direct Alles was zählt, a Grundy UFA serial drama, broadcast on RTL.

== Commentator ==
In June 2009, Andreas Stenschke began a series of commentaries online at Ändis Wirre Welt.

== Motion picture actor ==
In October 2009, Andreas Stenschke began shooting his first motion picture as an actor, taking the lead role of Marek Feldmann in writer/director Romain Gierenz's independent film, Das Plüschtier, also known by its English translation, The Cuddly Toy.

== Support for artists rights ==
Andreas Stenschke joined the European support for the 2007–2008 Writers Guild of America strike with a video produced in Cologne in which he warned Americans not to give in and suffer the fate befalling foreign artists who do not enjoy a residual structure for royalties and reruns as Americans do. The next year, Stenschke joined 38,000 fellow European artists signing a petition for the furtherance of the protection of artists rights.
