= Nina Bott =

German actress (born 1978)

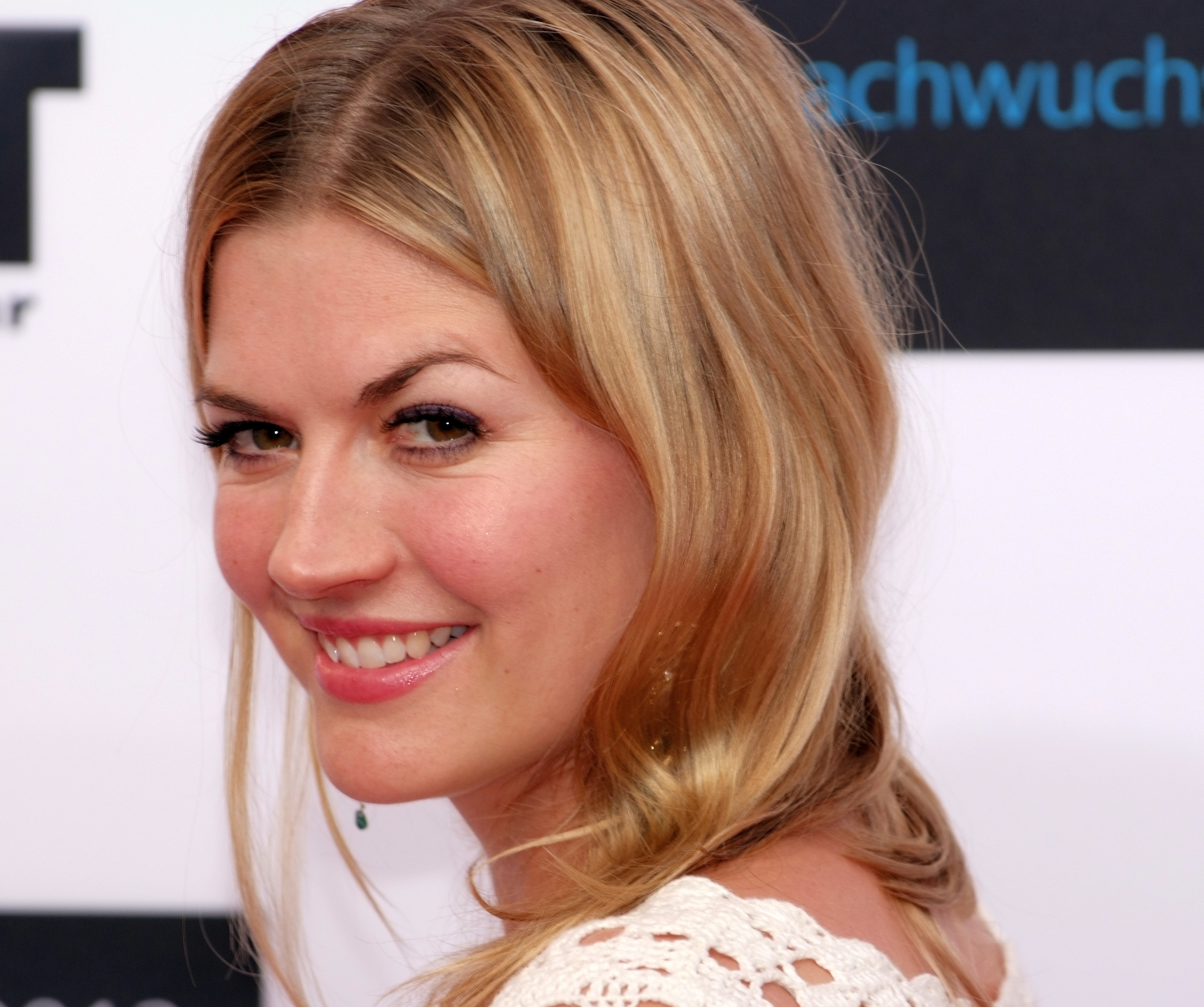
- Nina Bott (2012)
- Born: 1 January 1978 (age 48); Hamburg, West Germany
- Occupation: Actress
- Partner: Benjamin Baarz (2012–present)
- Children: 4

Nina Bott (born 1 January 1978) is a German actress.

== Career ==
=== Acting ===
Between August 1997 and September 2005, Bott played Cora Hinze Moreno on the popular German soap opera Gute Zeiten, schlechte Zeiten. She then appeared in the period drama Unter den Linden – Das Haus Gravenhorst. She then joined the soap opera Alles was zählt in 2008 as Celine Laffort, and stayed with the show for more than two years before leaving it with costar Norman Kalle. In March 2011, it was announced that Bott would join her third soap opera, Verbotene Liebe, where, in June of that year, she began playing Julia von Anstetten, a re-casting of one of the show's original characters. Her story takes place on location in Mallorca.

=== Other ===
Bott appeared on the cover of the February, 2002 issue of Playboy magazine's German edition, in Playboy's February 2012 issue and appeared again Playboy's June 2017 issue. With Leonie Lutz, she cowrote a book about pregnancy, with Germany-related advice, called Generation Mami.

== Personal life ==
Bott won the 1995 Hamburg windsurfing championship. In 1997, she completed her abitur (a prep-school university qualification) at Corvey Gymnasium in Lokstedt, in the Eimsbüttel borough of Hamburg, with acting as one of her majors. She was in a relationship with cameraman Florian König for 17 years; they had a son, Lennox (born 23 December 2003). Since 2012, Bott has been in a relationship with Benjamin Baarz, with whom she has three children.

== Partial filmography ==
=== Television ===
- 1984 to 1992: various advertising spots (Livio- Ketchup, Pelikan, Sanostol)
- 1993: Jugendfilm (Youth Film) (CD-Rom), Trebitsch
- 1997: advertising spots for Holsten Beer
- 1997–2005: Gute Zeiten, schlechte Zeiten
- 2001: Hinter Gittern – Der Frauenknast
- 2002: stern TV: Nina Bott fat makeup
- 2002: Blaubär und Blöd
- 2002: Das beste Stück
- 2002: video of songs "Die Welt steht still" by the Sam Ragga Band
- 2004: advertising spot gegen Gewalt an Kindern (Against violence towards Children)
- 2005: advertising spot for Persil
- 2005–2006: Unter den Linden – Das Haus Gravenhorst
- 2006: SOKO Kitzbühel – Was geschan mit Vera Z.?
- 2008–2010: Alles was zählt
- 2010: Countdown – Die Jagd beginnt
- 2010: Ich bin Culo
- 2011: Emilie Richards: Sehnsucht nach Sandy Bay
- 2011–present: Verbotene Liebe
- 2013–present: Lounge Of Nina Bott

=== Theatre ===
- 1995: "Carlos", Tankret Dorst
- 1995: "Preparadisesorrynow", Fassbinder
- 1996: "LiebeGehirneAbwickeln", Uwe Paulsen
- 1997: "Unter dem Milchwald", Dylan Thomas
- 1997: "Yvonne, Prinzessin von Burgund"

== Other work ==
- Nina Bott, Leonie Lutz: Generation Mami. Goldmann, 2004, ISBN 978-3-442-16660-2
