= Nicole Allmann =

Swiss actress

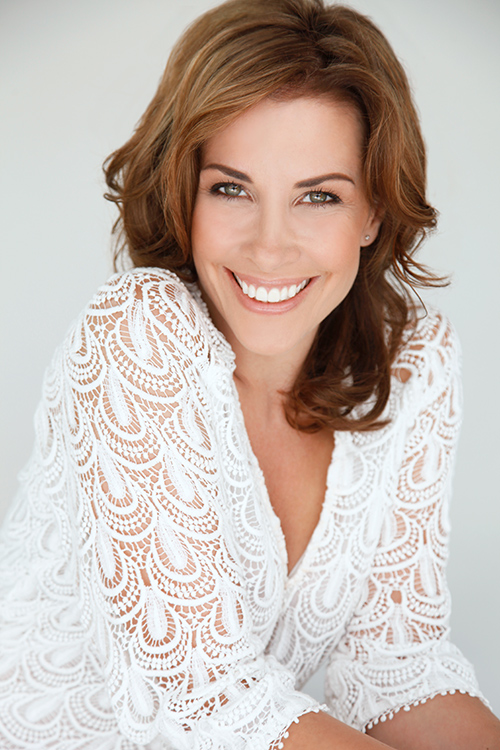
- Nicole Allmann
- Born: 14 February 1975 (age 51); Bern, Switzerland
- Occupations: Actress, comedian, model, writer
- Years active: 2004–present
- Spouse: Stephan Zingg (2009–present)
- Children: 3

Nicole Allmann (born 14 February 1975) is a Swiss actress, comedian, model and writer. Her first film role was in the 2004 short film Felizia.

== Early life ==
Allmann was born in Bern, Switzerland. Allmann's older brothers are both doctors. She has spent part of her life in Germany and was member of the German national figure skating squad when she was 18 years old.

== Education ==
Allmann went to secondary school in Obersdorf (Germany) and then studied law at school of law at LMU Munich. Later Allmann earned the acting certificate at the acting school of Zurich.

== Career ==
Allmann's first film role was in Juerg Ebe's romantic comedy Handyman (2005) co-starring Marco Rima, DJ Bobo and Dietmar Schoenherr. Her career took a more serious turn with a series of TV series and films, beginning with 5 Sterne Kerle inklusive (2005) and her role as Marina Felix in ARD's Verbotene Liebe (Forbidden Love). In 2008 Allmann played Christina Alex in the Pro7 TV series Unschuldig co-starring Alexandra Neldel.

Under the brand of WorldTop7 Allmann started publishing a website and mobile iPhone apps featuring the best boutique hotels, restaurants, nightclubs. and golf courses. The travel guides list the best, trendiest, coolest and most unusual places in more than 200 cities and regions around the world. Allmann is heading a group of international celebrities, TV executives, movie actors and restaurant evangelists who have carefully selected 7 hot-spots per city for quality, hip-factor and individuality.

== Filmography ==
=== Cinema ===
- 2004: Felizia
- 2005: Handyman

=== TV-films & Series ===
- 2005: 5 Sterne Kerle inklusive
- 2005: Paul Panzer – Die unglaublichen Geschichten
- 2007: Bis in die Spitzen
- 2007–2008: Verbotene Liebe
- 2008: Unschuldig
