= Exit (group) =

Swedish-German anti-Nazi group

Exit (German: Ausgang, Swedish: Utgång) is the name of a Swedish and a German anti-Nazi organisation, as well as another Swedish organisation with broader goals. The German anti-Nazi organisation was modelled on the Swedish one. All three groups aim to provide support and rehabilitation for neo-Nazis wanting to leave that subculture, as well as support for parents and those whose work brings them into contact with (usually young) people involved in Nazism.

Particular problems that Exit is designed to address are the problems of suddenly losing the support structure offered by the Nazi subculture and the high risk of violence committed by Nazis against former members: in some cases the work of Exit is reminiscent of a witness protection program.

== German group ==
The German organisation, Exit Deutschland, was co-founded by former Neo-Nazi Ingo Hasselbach, and former police detective Bernd Wagner. Since 2004, the organization has been one of three pillars of the Democratic Culture Centre.

According to Monika Lazar, spokeswoman for the Alliance 90/The Greens parliamentary group on strategies to combat the far-right, the strategies of Exit Deutschland have been rewarded by nearly 300 former neo-Nazis leaving Neo-Nazi groups by 2008.

It is funded primarily by donations from Amadeu Antonio Foundation and Freudenberg Foundation. It is also supported through programs of the federal government, such as "Working and Living in Diversity", Xenos and "Youth for diversity, tolerance and democracy - against right-wing extremism, xenophobia and antisemitism," and by projects of the federal states of Mecklenburg-Western Pomerania and Brandenburg. It was also a recipient in the years 2001 to 2005 of Stern's "Fighting right-wing violence support" initiative with donations.

In August 2011, Exit Deutschland prepared a trojan marketing campaign at Rock für Deutschland in Thuringia, a rock concert organized by the National Democratic Party where the organization handed out Neo-Nazi-themed free T-shirts to 250 out of 600 concertgoers. However, the T-shirts, when washed, contained a message which exhorted the recipients to break from Neo-Nazi groups and provided contact information about Exit Deutschland.

In 2020, Exit Deutschland celebrated its 20th anniversary. Bernd Wagner has criticized minister Franziska Giffey (SPD) for stopping to finance organizations such as Exit. He has opined that democracy has been moving away from real working people, and people do not feel represented by politicians. The so called "hygiene-demonstrations" might aid right wing extremists.

== First Swedish group ==
Between 1998 and 2001, 125 Swedes were said to have left the scene out of 133 assisted by Exit – although there were some issues with claims made by the organisation, as well as accusations of improprieties relating to funds.

The Swedish group was founded by former neo-Nazi Kent Lindahl. Lindahl also wrote the book Exit: min väg bort från nazismen (Swedish for Exit: my way out of Nazism) where he describes his time inside the neo-Nazi skinhead scene and how he got out of it.

== Second Swedish group ==
A separate Exit group was founded in 1999 in Motala, Sweden by a local school welfare officer and a police officer. This organisation worked with the Stockholm-based Exit group until 2002. The 'Exit Motala' group differed from the main group in offering programs for immigrant young people involved in gangs, and a specific program for girls who were associated with the neo-Nazi scene. This latter program operated throughout Sweden.

In May 2004, Exit's premises in Motala was destroyed in a fire. Before this, officials of Exit had faced threats and harassment, and the fire was thought to have been raised on criminal actions.
