= Ingo Hasselbach =

German writer

Ingo Klier, formerly Ingo Hasselbach (born 14 July 1967 in Berlin-Weißensee) is a German well known for being a former neo-Nazi. He is the author of the book Führer Ex: Memoirs of a Former Neo-Nazi (with Tom Reiss), also made into a movie directed by Winfried Bonengel, which has been translated into several languages. Furthermore he was co-founder of the German EXIT project, which helps people leave the neo-Nazi community. The project is modeled on a Swedish project with the same name.

Hasselbach's parents were two Communist-party loyal journalists. His mother was an editor at the ADN ("Allgemeiner Deutscher Nachrichtendienst", the former GDR's news service), while his father was employed at the broadcasting service in East Berlin. He was raised mostly by his grandparents. After graduating he began an apprenticeship to become a stonemason, but by 1985 he was subjected to legal censure because of rowdyism. His public appeal "The wall must fall!" brought him a prison sentence of nine months in 1987. In 1988 he joined the neo-Nazi community and was again legally censured for "subversive activities". After a first attempt to escape in August 1989 failed, he was detained again for three months until November 1989. Three days before the Berlin Wall fell a subsequent attempt to escape to West Germany succeeded.

In the years after German reunification he took a leading position in many right-wing extremist organisations, including the "National Alternative" (Nationale Alternative), and the "Comradeship of Social-revolutionary Nationalists" (Kameradschaft Sozialrevolutionäre Nationalisten). Then in 1993 he decided to break with the right-wing extremism community. By this point in time he had spent three years of his life in prison (one of the charges being for incitement to violence).

== Post neo-Nazism activities ==
His acrimonious departure from the neo-Nazi community and the publication of his books, Die Abrechnung: Ein Neonazi steigt aus written with Winfried Bonengel in 1993 and Führer Ex written with Tom Reiss in 1996, caused his former comrades to send him a letter bomb disguised as a book, which package was opened by his mother, without however sustaining injury. Hasselbach then confessed his accumulated knowledge about the neo-Nazi community to the German Federal Criminal Police Office. He did not only incriminate others but also himself. In 1997 he was given a two-year suspended sentence for an admitted fire-bombing of a left-wing, alternative youth club.

After 1995 he traveled quite often to the United States where he began to work as a journalist in the immediate aftermath of the Oklahoma City bombing, focusing on local extreme right-wing terrorism. This helped publicize the English version of his first book Die Abrechnung, Führer-Ex.

Having finished his second book Die Bedrohung - mein Leben nach dem Ausstieg (The threat - my life after the dropout) in 1996, Hasselbach lived for some time in the U.S. and the U.K. and campaigned publicly for the abolition of the death penalty and had numerous articles published in the news media on that topic. Following that period up until 2000 he worked together with Winfried Bonengel on the script for the movie "Führer Ex", with premiered in German cinemas at the end of 2002.

Today Hasselbach lives in Berlin and works as a freelance writer and journalist. He lives together with German photographer Nadja Klier.
