= Igor Dolgatschew =

German actor (born 1983)

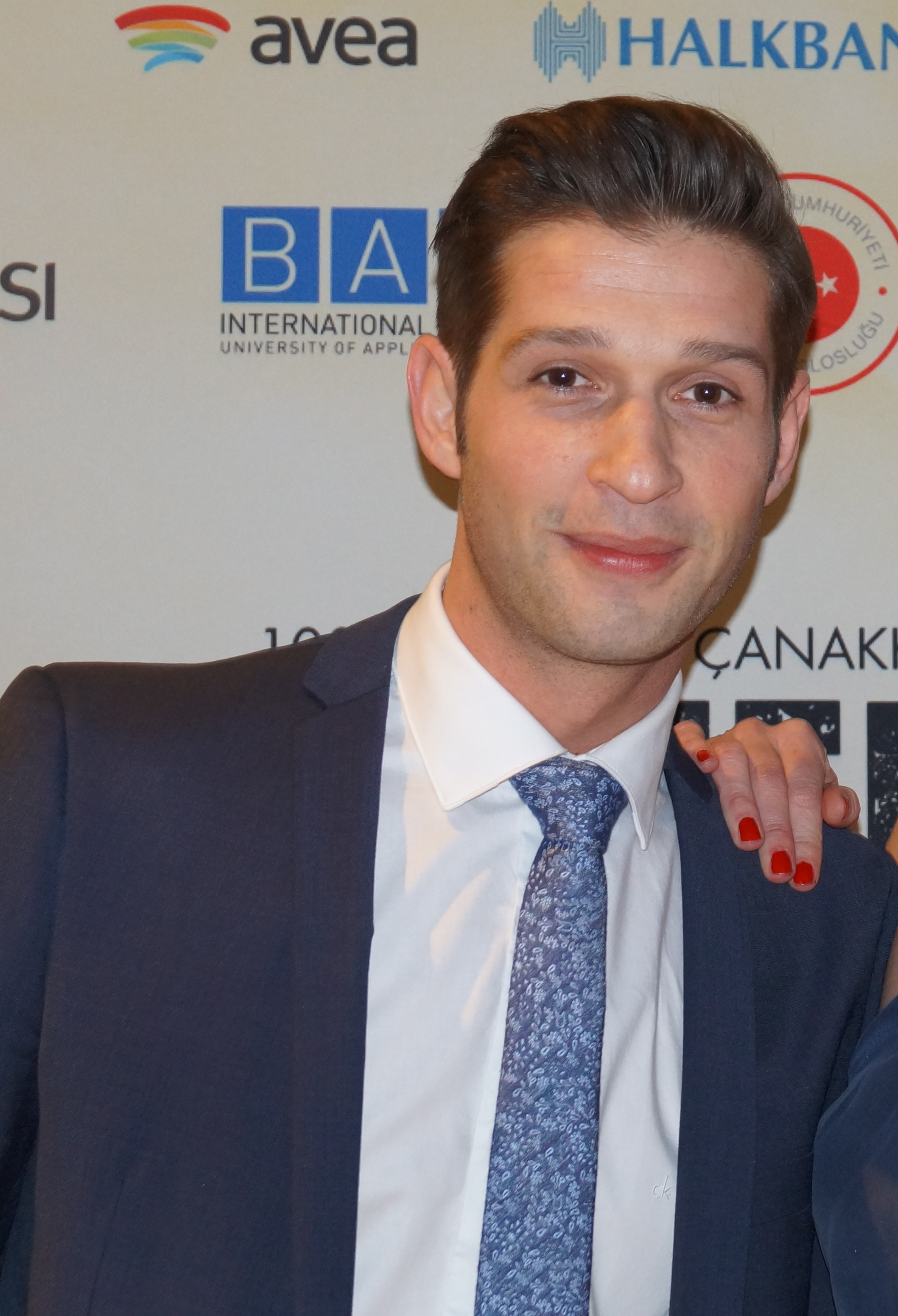
Dolgatschew in 2015

Igor Dolgatschew (born 22 November 1983) is a German actor.

Born in Novohrad-Volynskyi, Ukrainian SSR, he began performing in theatre plays while attending school in Magdeburg, Germany. He was soon cast in films and television shows like Wolffs Revier, Für alle Fälle Stefanie, Alphateam, Neues vom Bülowbogen, Beautiful Bitch and Woman Driving, Man Sleeping.

In 2007, Dolgatschew won the role of Deniz Öztürk in Alles was zählt ("All That Matters"). He plays the part of a young Turkish man coming to terms with his sexual identity with devotion and passion, winning fans both in Germany – where he was voted "Sexiest Soap Star" in 2008 and 2010 – and worldwide. In February 2008, he accepted Blu magazine's Best National TV Format award, along with co-star Dennis Grabosch, for AWZ's portrayal of the relationship between their characters.

When not contributing to the intense chemistry that DeRo is known for, Dolgatschew continues to perform on stage. He is a member of the Mund Art Ensemble, a theatre revival company in Frankfurt, and most recently appeared in Der keusche Lebemann.
