= Staatsanwalt Posch ermittelt =

- Country of origin: Germany

Staatsanwalt Posch ermittelt (English: Prosecutor Posch Investigates) was a pseudo-documentary series that aired on RTL 2007/2008.

The series was situated in Cologne and surrounding areas. The first season consisted of 132 one-hour episodes. The first 95 shows aired from 5 February 2007 to 22 June 2007. Reruns of 40 different episodes aired from 25 June 2007 to 17 August 2007; episodes 96-132 ran from 20 August 2007 to 12 October 2007.

The second season aired beginning on 19 November 2007, with 42 half-hour episodes. Its last episode initially aired on 18 April 2008.

== See also ==
- List of German television series
