= The Revenge of the Whore =

2012 film

- Written by: Thomas Wesskamp; Dirk Salomon
- Directed by: Hansjörg Thurn
- Starring: Alexandra Neldel; Bert Tischendorf; Götz Otto; Esther Schweins; Julian Weigend; Ill-Young Kim; Nadja Becker; Helmut Berger; Xenia Georgia Assenza
- Countries of origin: Austria; Czech Republic
- Original language: German

Production
- Producer: Josef Aichholzer
- Running time: 120 minutes

Original release
- Network: Sat.1
- Release: 28 February 2012

Related
- The Whore

The Revenge of the Whore (German: Die Rache der Wanderhure) is a 2012 television film, based on the novel The Lady of the Castle written by Iny Lorentz. It is the sequel of the 2010 television film The Whore. The title song is "Mna Na H-Eireann" which means "Women of Ireland" in the Irish language, by the French singer Nolwenn Leroy. The film was produced in Austria and the Czech Republic, by Josef Aichholzer and cost €5.6 million (about US$7.53 million). It aired in Germany February 28, 2012 on Sat.1.

== Plot ==
Marie (played by Alexandra Neldel) and her husband Michel Adler (played by Bert Tischendorf) have a happy life until Michel has to go to war against the Hussites for König Sigismund but does not come back. Marie does not believe that he is dead and starts her journey to find out what really happened to him.

It is sometimes displayed - on recording and when digitally streamed - as The Revenge of the Siren in English-translated versions (and similarly for its predecessor, The Royal Siren, and successor, The Legacy of the Siren, in the series.)

== Cast ==
- Alexandra Neldel as Marie
- Bert Tischendorf as Michel Adler
- Götz Otto as König Sigismund
- Esther Schweins as Isabel de Melancourt
- Julian Weigend as Janus Supertur
- Ill-Young Kim as Marat
- Nadja Becker as Hiltrud
- Helmut Berger as Graf Sokolny
- Xenia Georgia Assenza as Janka
