= The Whore (2010 film) =

2010 film

- DVD cover
- Based on: Die Wanderhure by Iny Lorentz
- Written by: Gabriele Kister
- Directed by: Hansjörg Thurn
- Starring: Alexandra Neldel; Alexander Beyer; Thomas Morris; Gregor Seberg; Nadja Becker
- Theme music composer: Stephan Massimo
- Country of origin: Germany
- Original language: German

Production
- Producer: Josef Aichholzer
- Cinematography: Gerhard Schirlo
- Editor: Andreas Radke
- Running time: 121 minutes
- Budget: €5.5 million

Original release
- Release: 5 October 2010

The Whore (German: Die Wanderhure) is a 2010 German television film, adapted from the novel The Wandering Harlot by Iny Lorentz. The film is set in Konstanz, (now Germany) in the years 1414 and 1415. The screenplay was adapted by Gabriele Kister and directed by Hansjörg Thurn.

The film is also known under the alternative title The Royal Siren.

The sequel is the 2012 television film The Revenge of the Whore.

== Plot ==
In Constance, on Lake Constance in southern Germany, in 1413, the beautiful Marie is to marry the illegitimate son of the Count of Keilburg against her will. As a result of intrigues, Marie is raped, imprisoned and tortured. She is later taken in by travelling whores and nursed back to health. Marie wants revenge. She earns her living through prostitution and, thanks to her beauty, meets the influential Count of Arnstein. With the help of the count and his wife, Marie finds her way into the bed of King Sigismund, whom she needs to pursue her revenge plan. When the prostitutes revolt over poor living and working conditions, Marie succeeds in proving her innocence.

== Cast ==
- Alexandra Neldel as Marie Schärer
- Attila Árpa as Utz Kaffli
- Alexander Beyer as Jodokus von Arnstein / Ewald von Marburg
- Thure Riefenstein as Graf Dietmar von Arnstein
- Thomas Morris as Pfalzgraf Ludwig III
- Gregor Seberg as Hunold
- Elena Uhlig as Gräfin von Arnstein
- Michael Brandner as Graf von Keilburg
- Bert Tischendorf as Michel
- Julian Weigend as Ruppertus
- Blerim Destani as Giso
- Lili Gesler as Madeleine
- Nadja Becker as Hiltrud
- Götz Otto as König
- Daniel Roesner as Kleiner Soldat

== See also ==
- List of historical drama films
