= Quedlinburg =

Town in Saxony-Anhalt, Germany

- Town
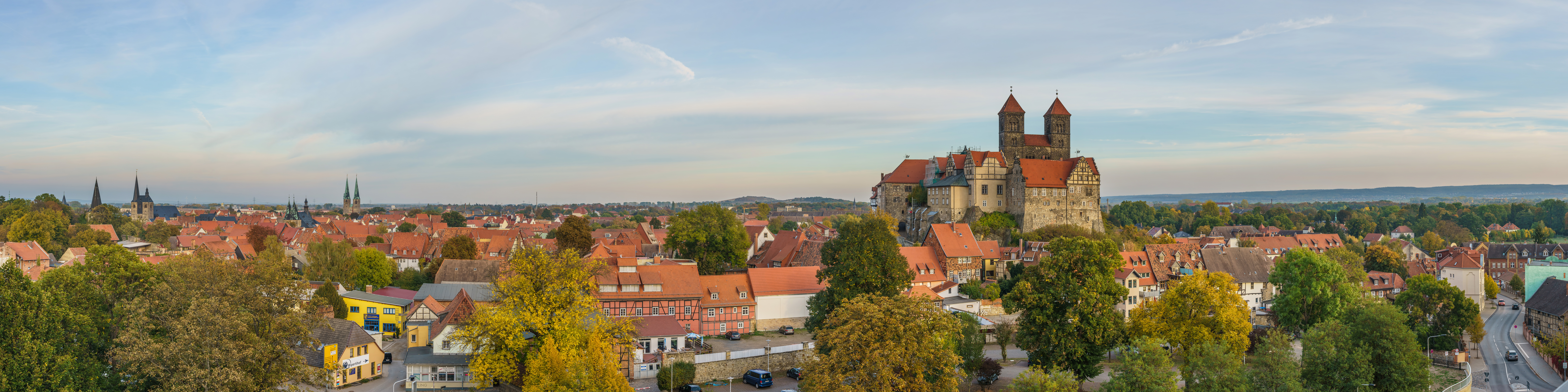
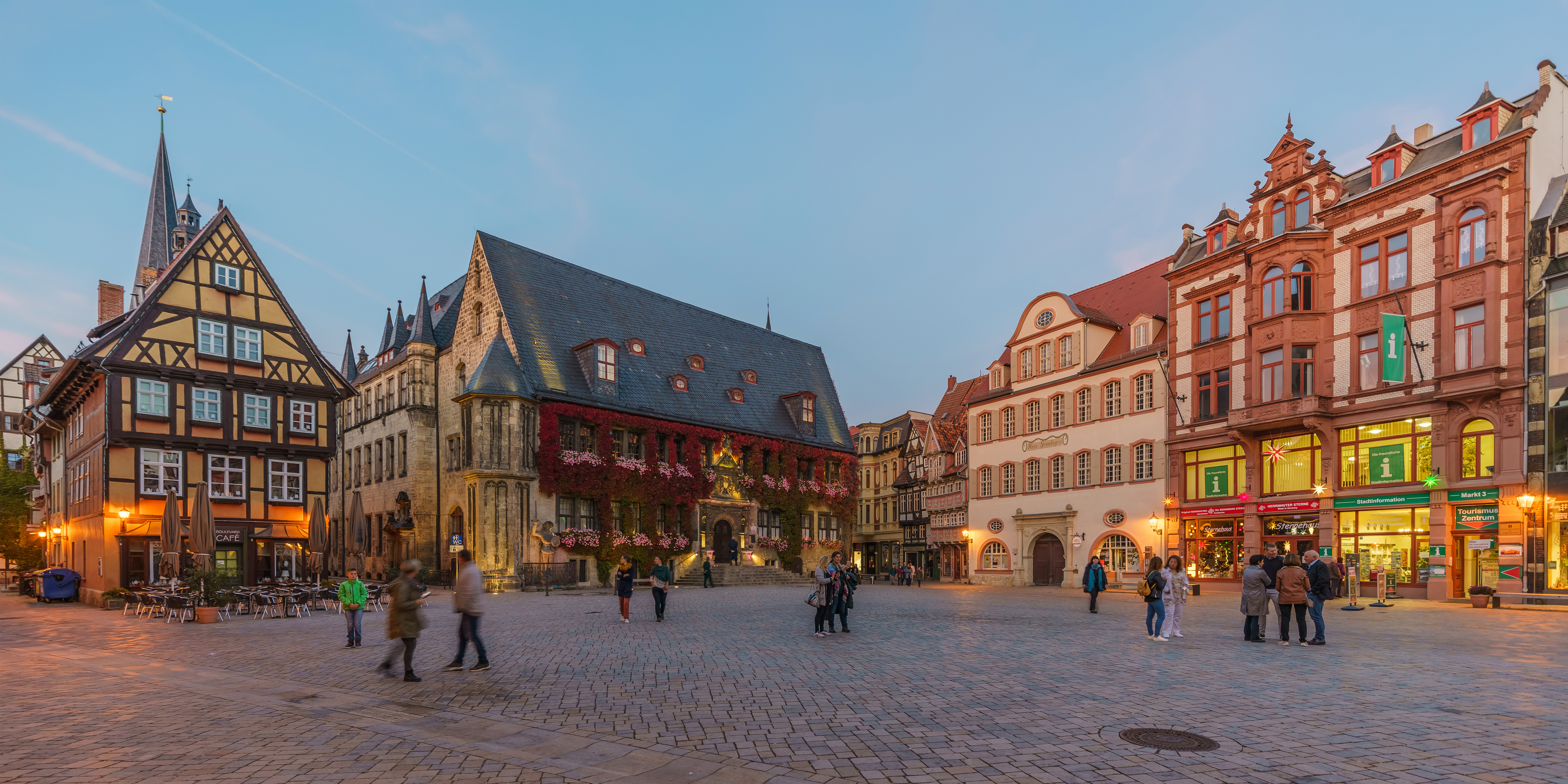
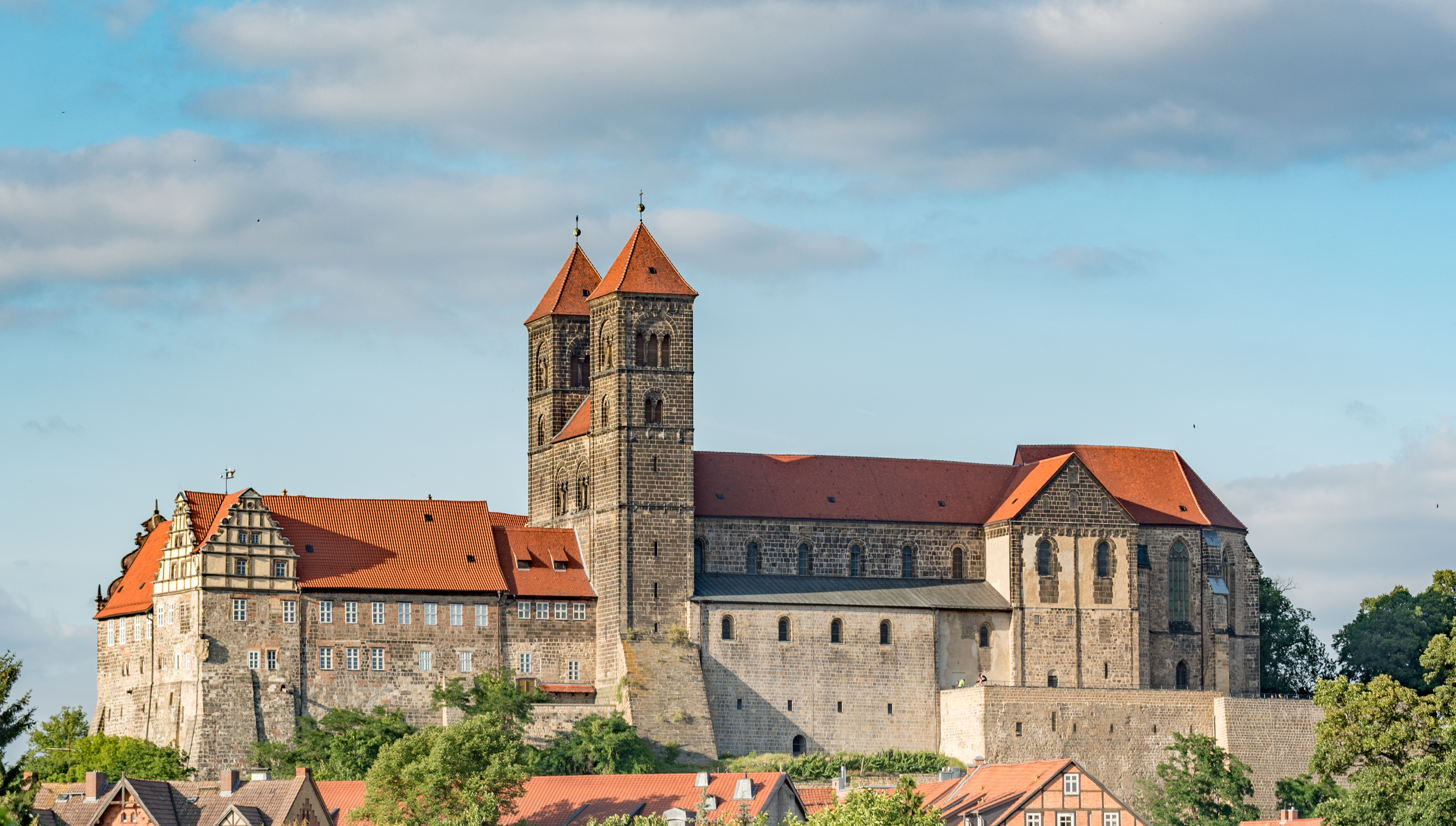
- Top: View over Quedlinburg. Middle: Market Square. Bottom: Quedlinburg Castle and Abbey.

- Coat of arms

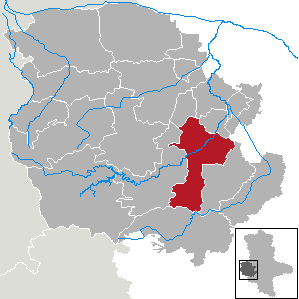
- Location of Quedlinburg within Harz district
- Interactive map of Quedlinburg
- Location within Germany Location within Saxony-Anhalt
- Coordinates: 51°47′30″N 11°8′50″E
- Country: Germany
- State: Saxony-Anhalt
- District: Harz
- Subdivisions: 7 Stadtteile

Government
  - Mayor (2022–29): Frank Ruch (CDU)

Area
  - Total: 120.45 km^{2} (46.51 sq mi)
- Elevation: 123 m (404 ft)

Population (2025-12-31)
  - Total: 23,069
  - Density: 191.52/km^{2} (496.04/sq mi)
- Time zone: UTC+01:00 (CET)
  - Summer (DST): UTC+02:00 (CEST)
- Postal codes: 06484, 06485
- Dialling codes: 03946, 039485
- Vehicle registration: HZ, HBS, QLB, WR
- Website: www.quedlinburg.de

UNESCO World Heritage Site
- Official name: Collegiate Church, Castle, and Old Town of Quedlinburg
- Criteria: Cultural: iv
- Reference: 535
- Inscription: 1994 (18th Session)
- Area: 90 ha (220 acres)
- Buffer zone: 270 ha (670 acres)

Quedlinburg (German pronunciation: [ˈkveːtlɪnbʊʁk]) is a town situated just north of the Harz mountains, in the district of Harz in the west of Saxony-Anhalt, Germany. As an influential and prosperous trading centre during the early Middle Ages, Quedlinburg became a center of influence under the Ottonian dynasty in the 10th and 11th centuries. The castle, church and old town with around 2,100 timber houses, dating from this time of influence, were added to the UNESCO's World Heritage List in 1994 because of their exceptional preservation and outstanding Romanesque architecture.

Quedlinburg has a population of more than 24,000. The town was the capital of the district of Quedlinburg until 2007, when the district was dissolved. Several locations in the town are designated stops along a scenic holiday route, the Romanesque Road.

== History ==
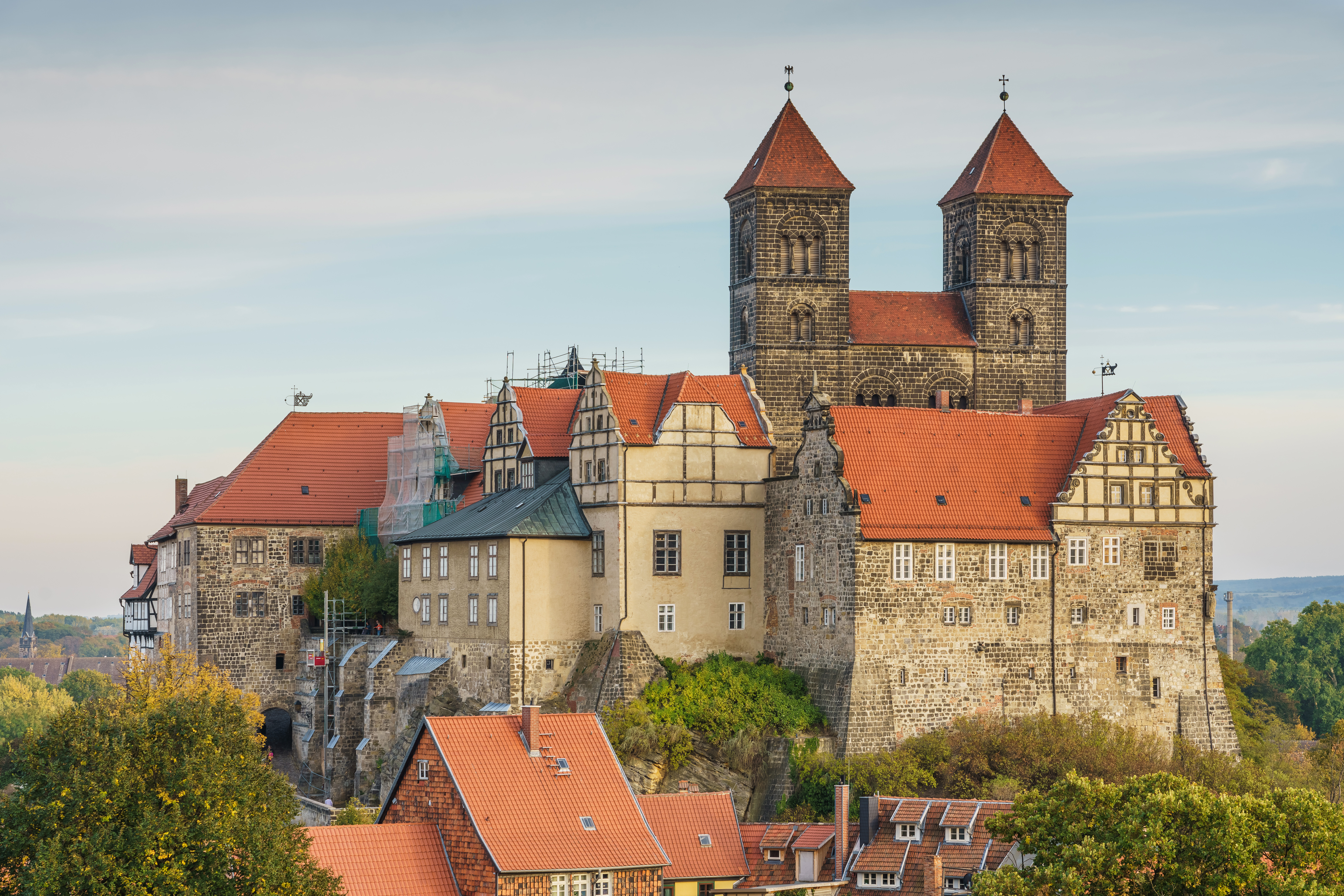
Quedlinburg Castle

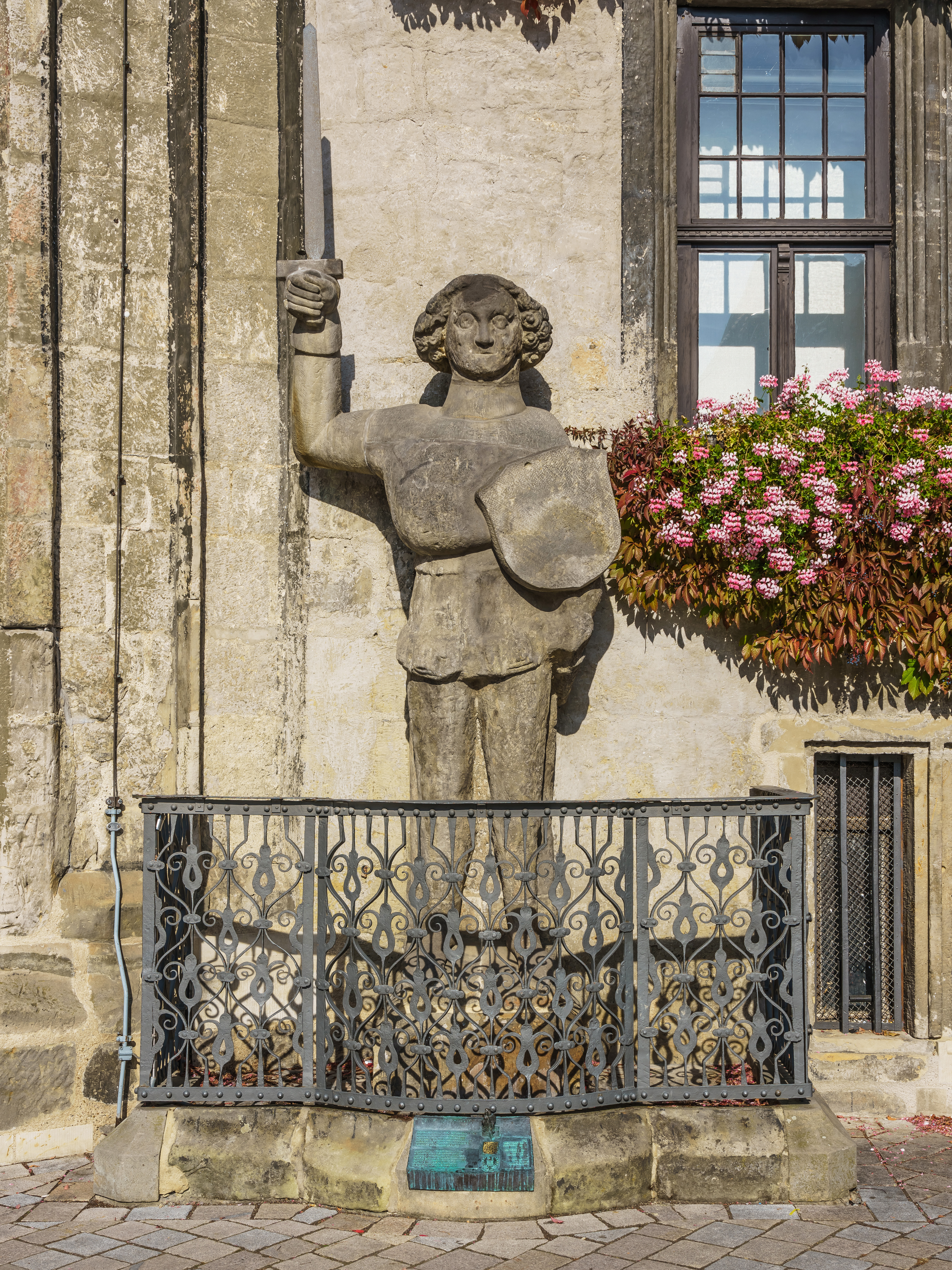
Statue of Roland

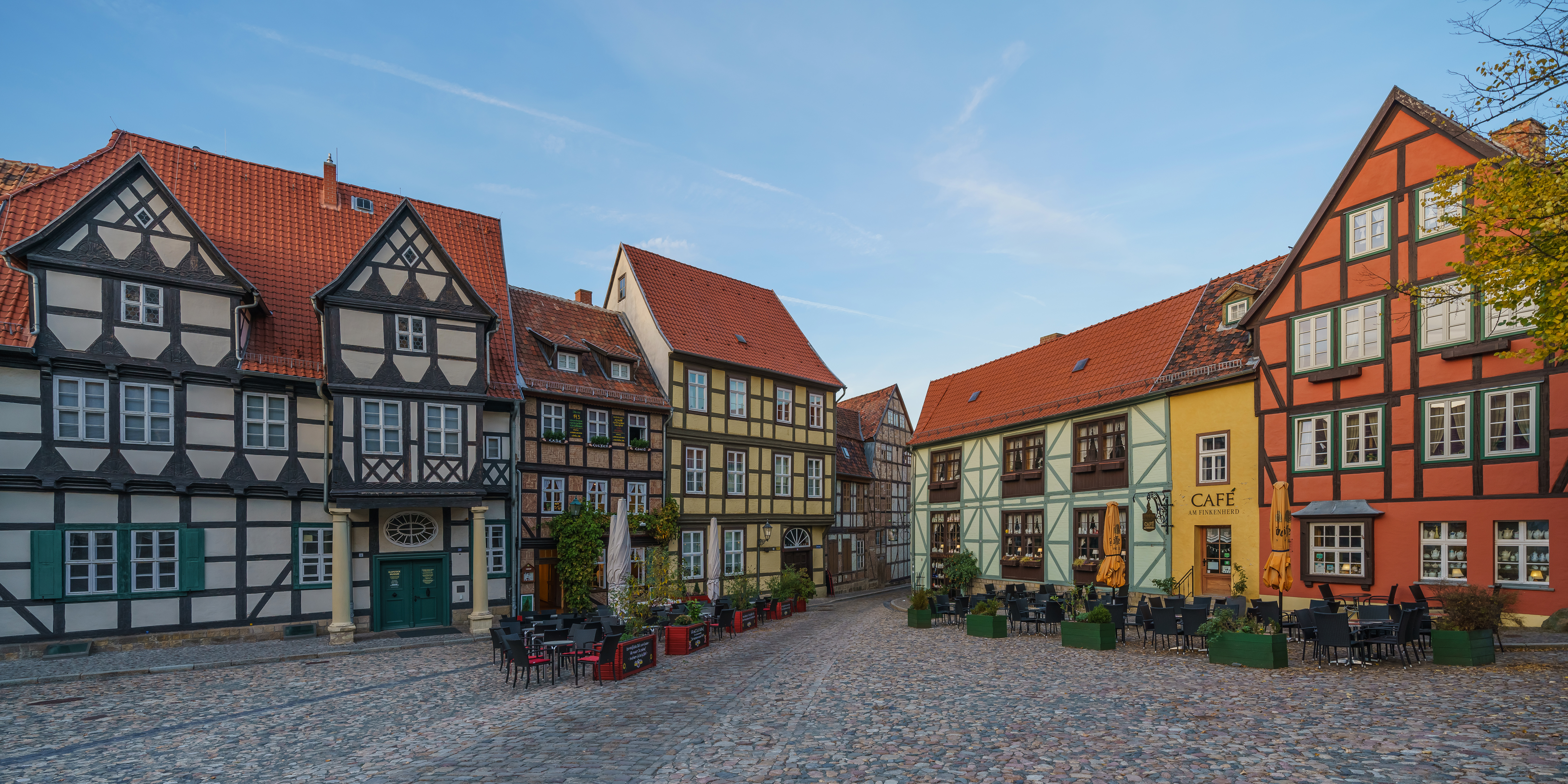
Restored houses in Quedlinburg Old Town, 2018

The town of Quedlinburg is known to have existed since at least the early 9th century, when there was a settlement known as Gross Orden on the eastern bank of the River Bode. It was first mentioned as a town in 922 as part of a donation by King Henry the Fowler (Heinrich der Vogler). The records of this donation were held by the abbey of Corvey.

According to legend, Henry had been offered the German crown at Quedlinburg in 919 by Franconian nobles, giving rise to the town being called the "cradle of the German Reich".

After Henry's death in 936, his widow Saint Matilda founded a religious community for women (Frauenstift) on the castle hill, where daughters of the higher nobility were educated. The main task of this collegiate foundation, Quedlinburg Abbey, was to pray for the memory of King Henry and the rulers who came after him. The Annals of Quedlinburg were also compiled there. The first abbess was Matilda, a granddaughter of King Henry and St. Matilda.

The Quedlinburg castle complex, founded by King Henry I and built up by Emperor Otto I in 936, was an imperial Pfalz of the Saxon emperors. The Pfalz, including the male convent, was in the valley, where today the Roman Catholic Church of St. Wiperti is situated, while the women's convent was located on the castle hill.

In 973, shortly before the death of Emperor Otto I, a Reichstag (Imperial Convention) was held at the imperial court in which Mieszko, duke of Polans, and Boleslav, duke of Bohemia, as well as numerous other nobles from as far away as Byzantium and Bulgaria, gathered to pay homage to the emperor. On the occasion, Otto the Great introduced his new daughter-in-law Theophanu, a Byzantine princess whose marriage to Otto II brought hope for recognition and continued peace between the rulers of the Eastern and Western empires.

In 994, Otto III granted the right of market, tax, and coining, and established the first market place to the north of the castle hill.

The town became a member of the Hanseatic League in 1426. Quedlinburg Abbey frequently disputed the independence of the town, which sought the aid of the Bishopric of Halberstadt. In 1477, Abbess Hedwig, aided by her brothers Ernest and Albert, broke the resistance of the town and expelled the bishop's forces. Quedlinburg was forced to leave the Hanseatic League and was subsequently protected by the Electorate of Saxony. Both town and abbey converted to Lutheranism in 1539 during the Protestant Reformation.

In 1697, Frederick Augustus I of Poland–Saxony sold his rights to Quedlinburg to Elector Frederick III of Brandenburg for 240,000 thalers. Quedlinburg Abbey contested Brandenburg-Prussia's claims throughout the 18th century, however. The abbey was secularized in 1802 during the German Mediatisation, and Quedlinburg passed to the Kingdom of Prussia as part of the Principality of Quedlinburg. Part of the Napoleonic Kingdom of Westphalia from 1807 to 1813, it was included within the new Prussian Province of Saxony in 1815. In all this time, ladies ruled Quedlinburg as abbesses without "taking the veil"; they were free to marry. The last of these ladies was a Swedish princess, an early fighter for women's rights, Sofia Albertina.

During the Nazi regime, the memory of Henry I became a sort of cult, as Heinrich Himmler saw himself as the reincarnation of the "most German of all German" rulers. The collegiate church and castle were to be turned into a shrine for Nazi Germany. The cathedral was closed in 1938 and during the war. Georg Ay was local party chief from 1931 until the end of World War II. During the war, Quedlinburg was the location of a subcamp of the Buchenwald concentration camp and a subcamp of the Mittelbau-Dora concentration camp. Shortly before the end of the war, Nazi officials forced 22 inmates of the Langenstein-Zwieberge concentration camp to burn records related to the Holocaust in the town's local crematory, and subsequently killed those inmates. American occupation during the last months of World War II brought back the Protestant bishop and the church bells, and the Nazi-style eagle was removed from the tower. However, in the 1980s, upon the death of one of the US military men, the theft of medieval art from Quedlinburg came to light.

Quedlinburg was administered within Bezirk Halle while part of the Communist East Germany from 1949 to 1990. It became part of the state of Saxony-Anhalt upon German reunification in 1990.

During Quedlinburg's Communist era, restoration specialists from Poland were called in during the 1980s to carry out repairs on the old architecture. Today, Quedlinburg is a center of restoration of Fachwerk houses.

== Geography ==
=== Location ===
The town is located north of the Harz mountains, about 123 m above NHN. The nearest mountains reach 181 m above NHN. The largest part of the town is located in the western part of the Bode river valley. This river comes from the Harz mountains and flows into the river Saale, a tributary of the river Elbe. The municipal area of Quedlinburg is 120.42 square kilometres (46.49 square miles). Before the incorporation of the two (previously independent) municipalities of Gernrode and Bad Suderode in January 2014, it was only 78.14 square kilometres (30.17 square miles).

=== Divisions ===
The town Quedlinburg consists of Quedlinburg proper and the following Ortsteile or municipal divisions:

- Bad Suderode
- Gernrode
- Gersdorfer Burg
- Morgenrot
- Münchenhof
- Quarmbeck

=== Climate ===
Quedlinburg has an oceanic climate (Cfb) resulting from prevailing westerlies, blowing from the high-pressure area in the central Atlantic towards Scandinavia. Snowfall occurs almost every winter. January and February are the coldest months of the year, with an average temperature of 0.5 °C and 1.5 °C. July and August are the hottest months, with an average temperature of 17 °C (63 °F) and 18 °C (64 °F). The average annual precipitation is close to 438 mm with rain occurring usually from May to September. This precipitation is one of the lowest in Germany, which has an annual average hovering around 440 mm. In August 2010, Quedlinburg was the driest place in Germany, with only 72.4 L/m^{2}.

Climate data for Quedlinburg
Month	Jan	Feb	Mar	Apr	May	Jun	Jul	Aug	Sep	Oct	Nov	Dec	Year
Mean daily maximum °C (°F)	2 (36)	4 (39)	8 (46)	13 (55)	19 (66)	21 (70)	22 (72)	23 (73)	19 (66)	13 (55)	6 (43)	3 (37)	13 (55)
Daily mean °C (°F)	0.5 (32.9)	1.5 (34.7)	4.5 (40.1)	8.0 (46.4)	13.5 (56.3)	15.5 (59.9)	17.0 (62.6)	18.0 (64.4)	14.0 (57.2)	9.5 (49.1)	3.5 (38.3)	1.5 (34.7)	8.9 (48.1)
Mean daily minimum °C (°F)	−1 (30)	−1 (30)	1 (34)	3 (37)	8 (46)	10 (50)	12 (54)	13 (55)	9 (48)	6 (43)	1 (34)	0 (32)	5 (41)
Average precipitation mm (inches)	23 (0.9)	22 (0.9)	28 (1.1)	38 (1.5)	53 (2.1)	57 (2.2)	47 (1.9)	54 (2.1)	33 (1.3)	27 (1.1)	30 (1.2)	26 (1.0)	438 (17.3)
Average rainy days	11	9	10	10	10	11	10	10	9	9	11	12	122
Average relative humidity (%)	87	83	82	74	67	71	72	69	78	82	87	86	78
Mean monthly sunshine hours	47.2	66.9	107.5	136.7	182.6	172.2	186.4	183.6	139.0	104.9	63.2	42.1	1,432.3
Source 1: Deutscher Wetterdienst, Normalperiode 1961–1990
Source 2: Zoover

== Demographics ==
Historical population
Year	Pop.	±%
1786	8,382	—
1807	10,476	+25.0%
1820	11,507	+9.8%
1830	12,001	+4.3%
1840	13,431	+11.9%
1852	13,886	+3.4%
1861	14,835	+6.8%
1871	16,800	+13.2%
1880	18,437	+9.7%
1890	20,761	+12.6%
1900	23,378	+12.6%
1910	27,233	+16.5%
1919	28,190	+3.5%
1939	30,320	+7.6%
1946	35,142	+15.9%
1950	35,555	+1.2%
1955	33,125	−6.8%
1960	30,965	−6.5%
1965	30,840	−0.4%
1970	30,829	−0.0%
1975	29,711	−3.6%
1980	28,585	−3.8%
1985	29,394	+2.8%
1990	28,663	−2.5%
1995	25,844	−9.8%
2000	24,114	−6.7%
2005	22,607	−6.2%
2009*	21,203	−6.2%

== Governance ==
The mayor is Frank Ruch (CDU), elected in 2022.

=== Town twinning ===
Quedlinburg is twinned with:

- Aulnoye-Aymeries, France, since 1961
- Herford, Germany, since 1991
- Celle, Germany, since 1991
- Hameln, Germany, since 1991
- Hann. Münden, Germany, since 1991

== Attractions ==
In the centre of the town are a wide selection of half-timbered buildings from at least five different centuries (including a 14th-century structure, one of Germany's oldest), while around the outer fringes of the old town are examples of Jugendstil buildings, dating from the late 19th and early 20th centuries.

The old town of Quedlinburg is among the largest in Germany with a size of around 90 hectares. 2000 half-timbered houses can be found here. The oldest, the "Ständerbau", dates back from 1347.

Another famous building is called "Klopstockhaus", the birthplace of poet Friedrich Gottlieb Klopstock.

In 1986, the Lyonel Feininger Gallery (today: Museum Lyonel Feininger) was founded.

Since December 1994, the old town of Quedlinburg and the castle mount with the Stiftskirche (collegiate church) are listed as one of UNESCO's World Heritage Sites. Quedlinburg is one of the best-preserved medieval and Renaissance towns in Europe, having escaped major damage in World War II.

In 2006, the Selke valley branch of the Harz Narrow Gauge Railways was extended to Quedlinburg from Gernrode, giving access to the historic steam narrow gauge railway, Alexisbad and the high Harz plateau.

The castle and Stiftskirche St. Servatius still dominate the town like in the early Middle Ages. The church is a prime example of German Romanesque style. The treasure of the church, containing ancient Christian religious artifacts and books, was stolen by an American soldier but brought back to Quedlinburg in 1993 and is again on display here.

The former Stiftskirche St. Wiperti was established in 936 when the Kanonikerstift St. Wigpertus (of male canons) was moved from the castle hill to make way for what became Quedlinburg Abbey. The church was built at the location of the first Ottonian Royal palace at Quedlinburg. Around 1020, a three-aisled crypt was added to the basilica. The crypt, which survived all later alterations to the church, is also a designated stop on the Romanesque Road today.

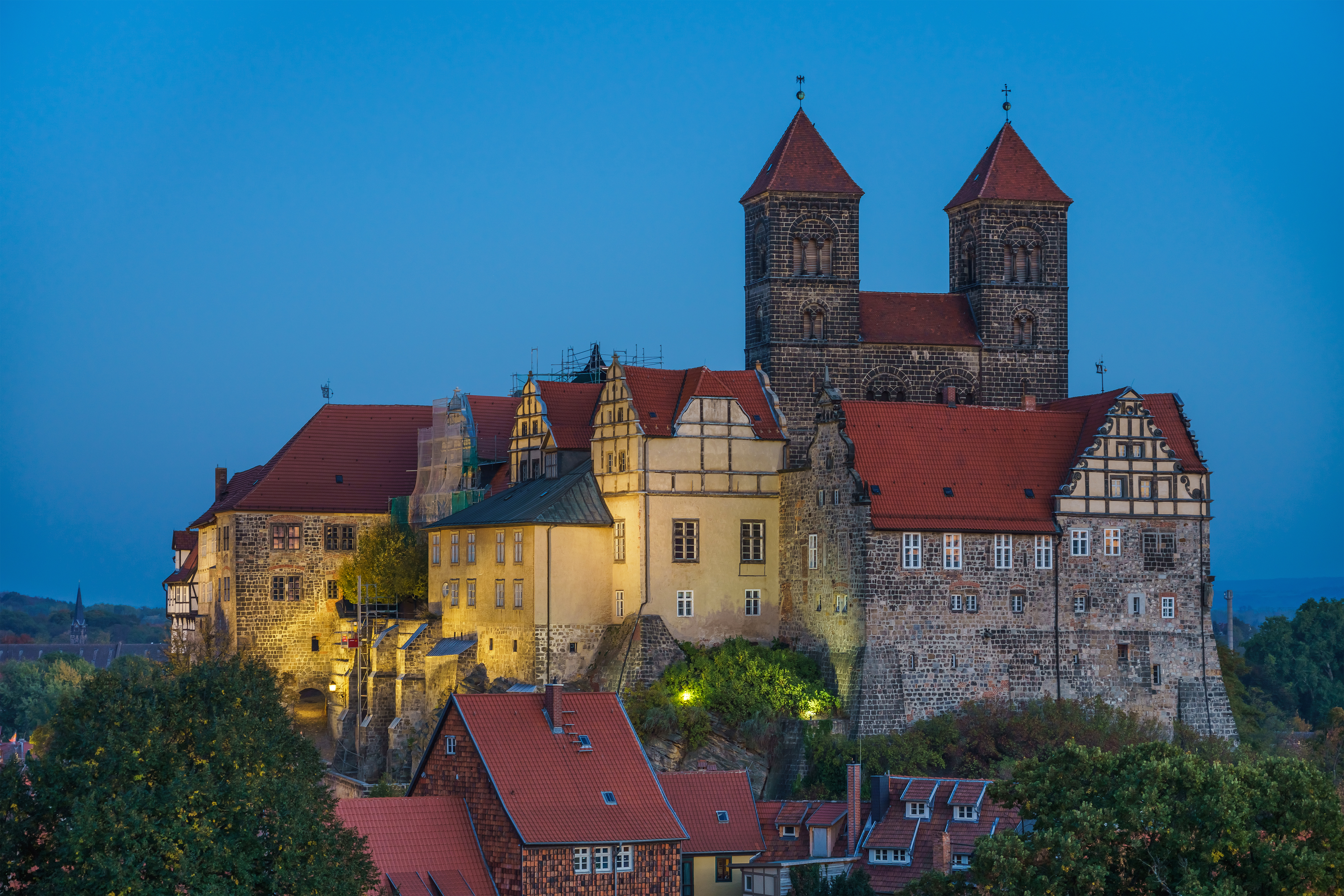
Castle

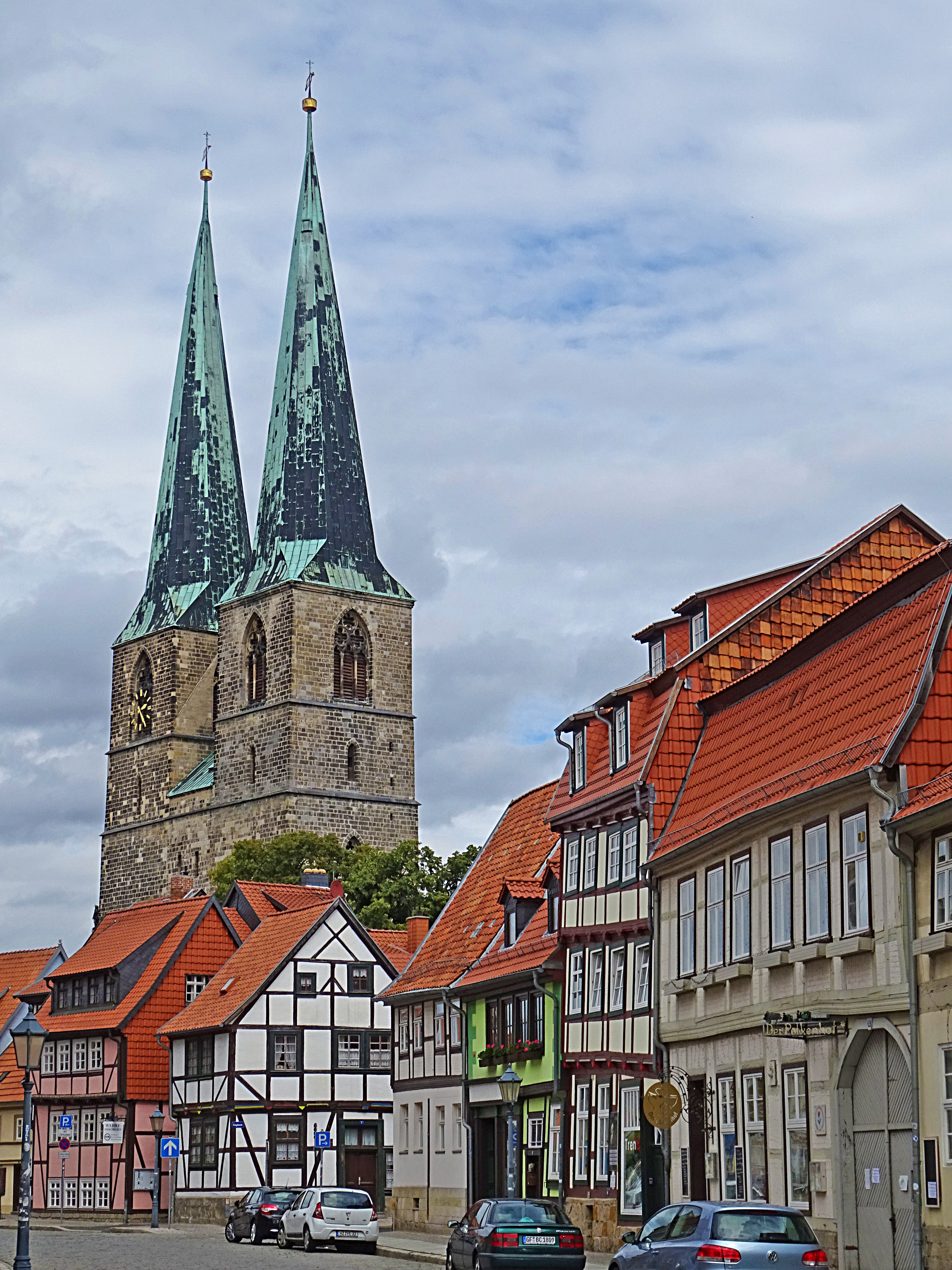
St. Nikolai church

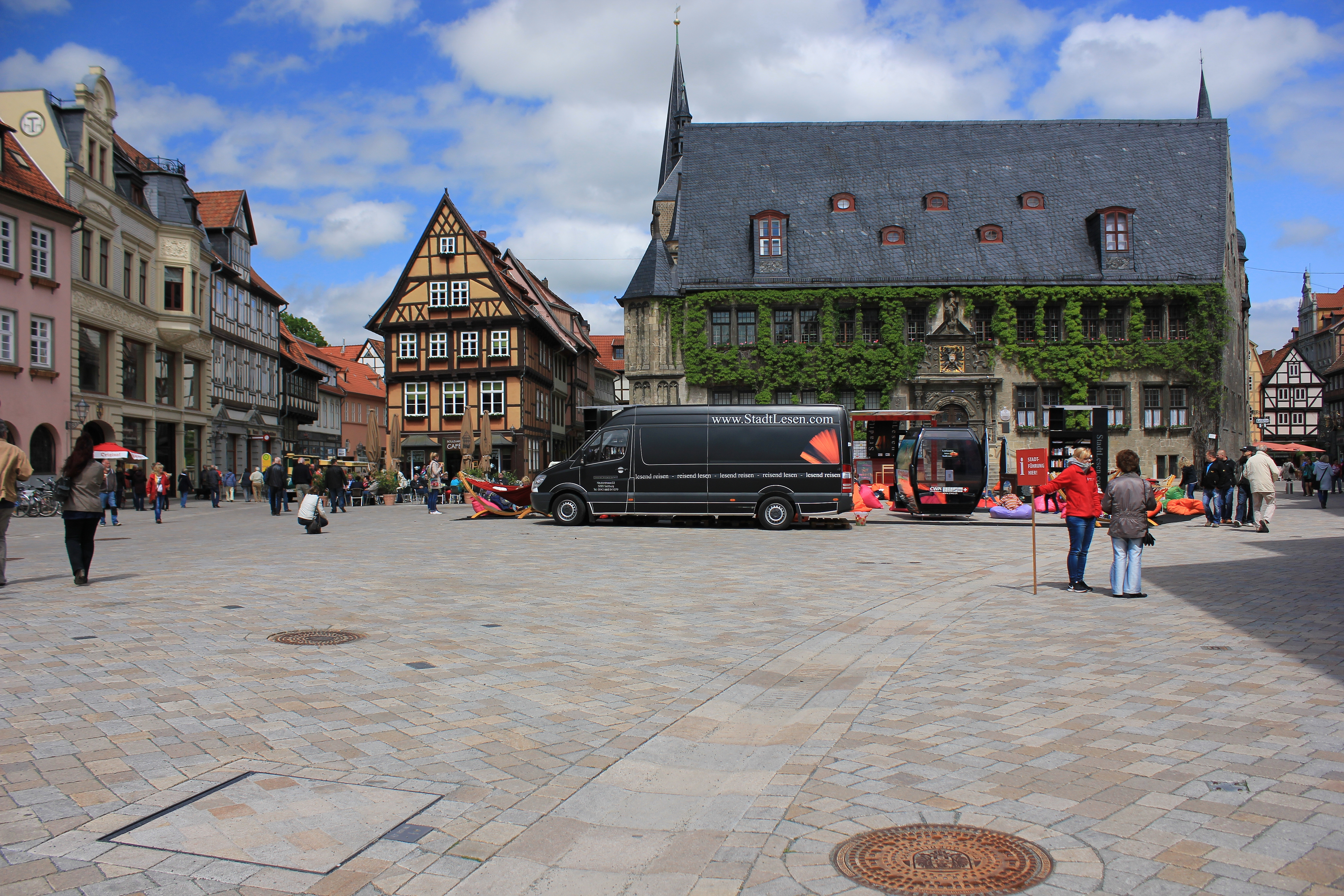
Market with Town Hall

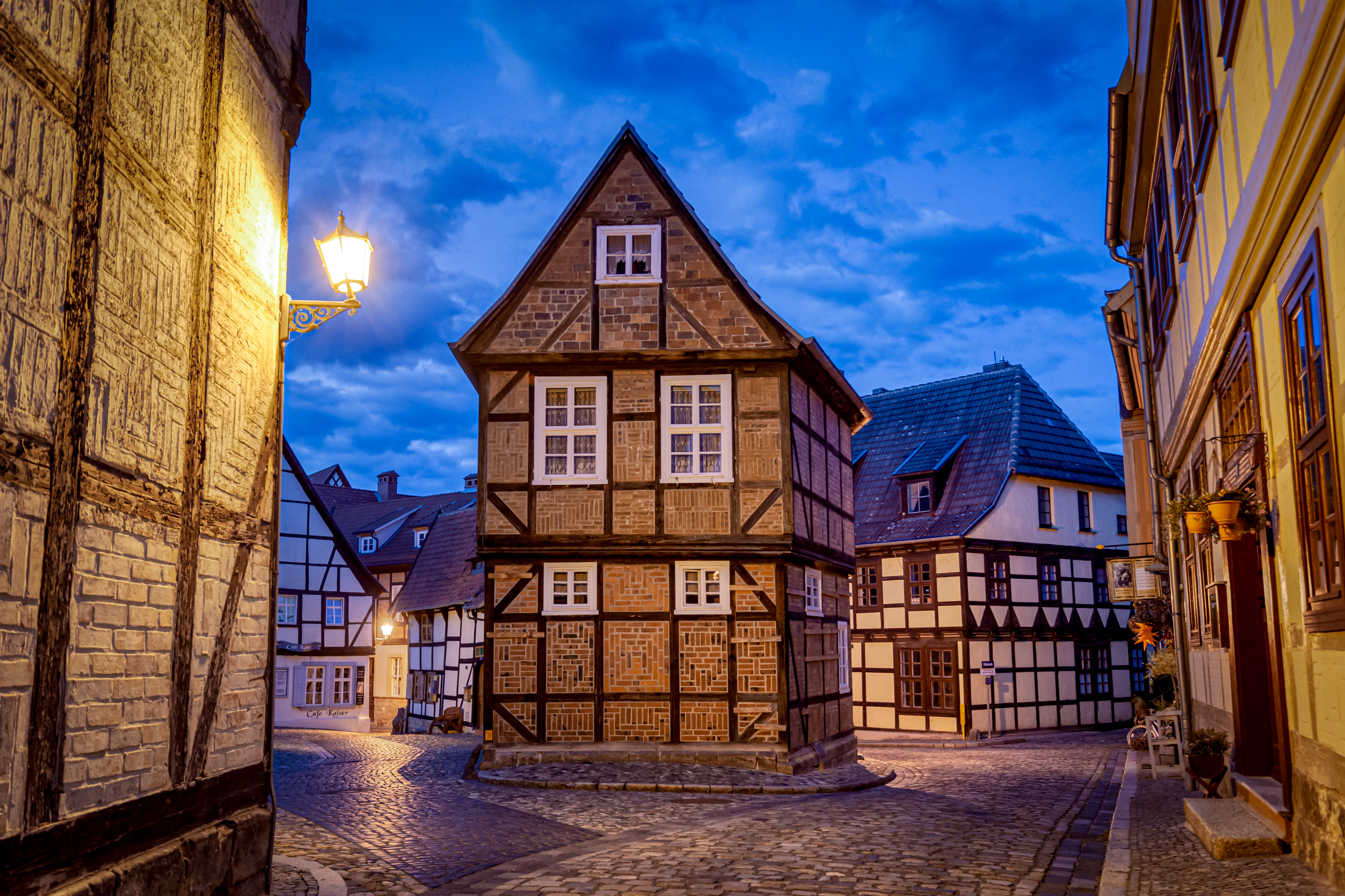
Quedlinburg old town

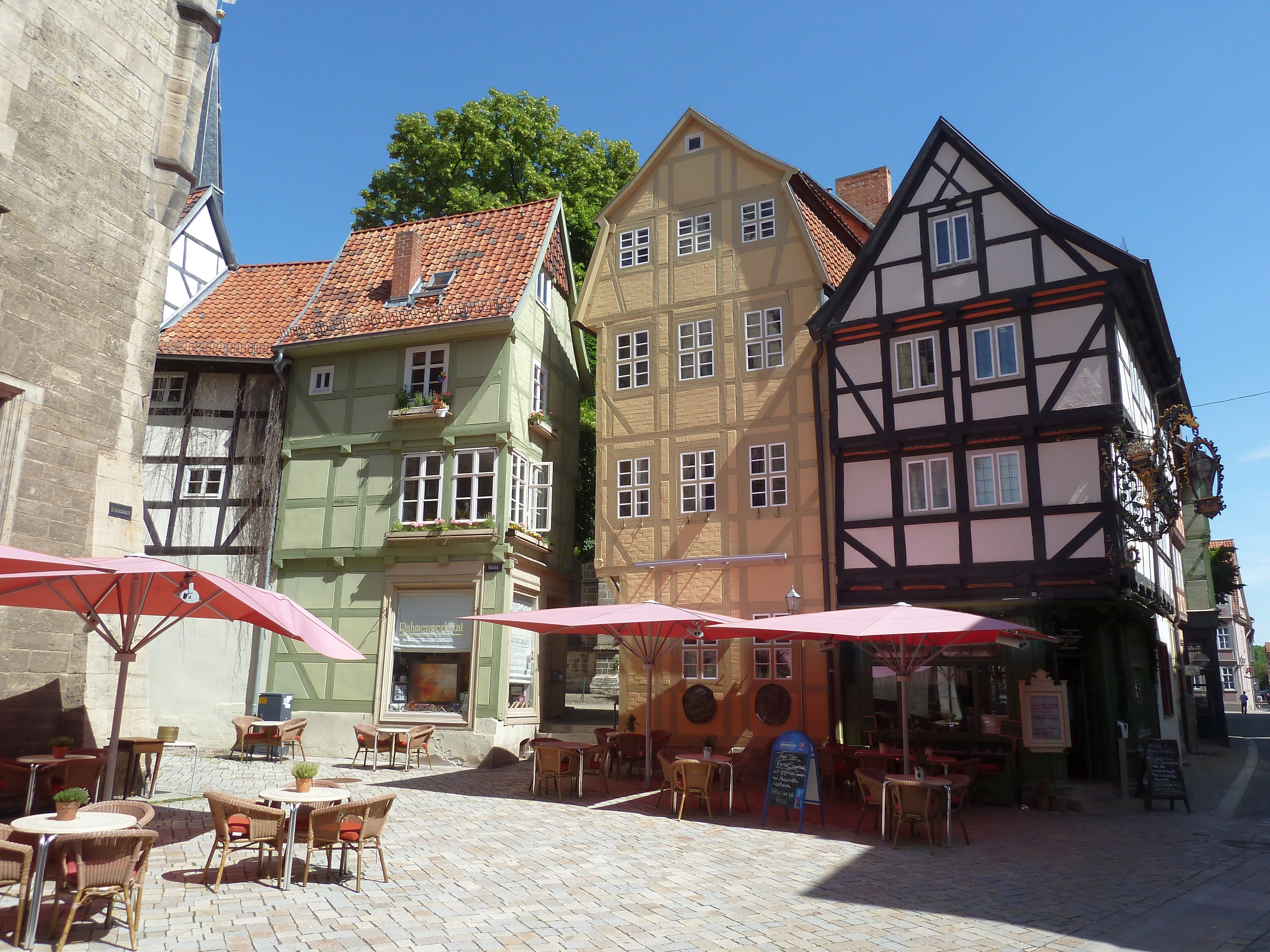
Breits Straße (Old town)

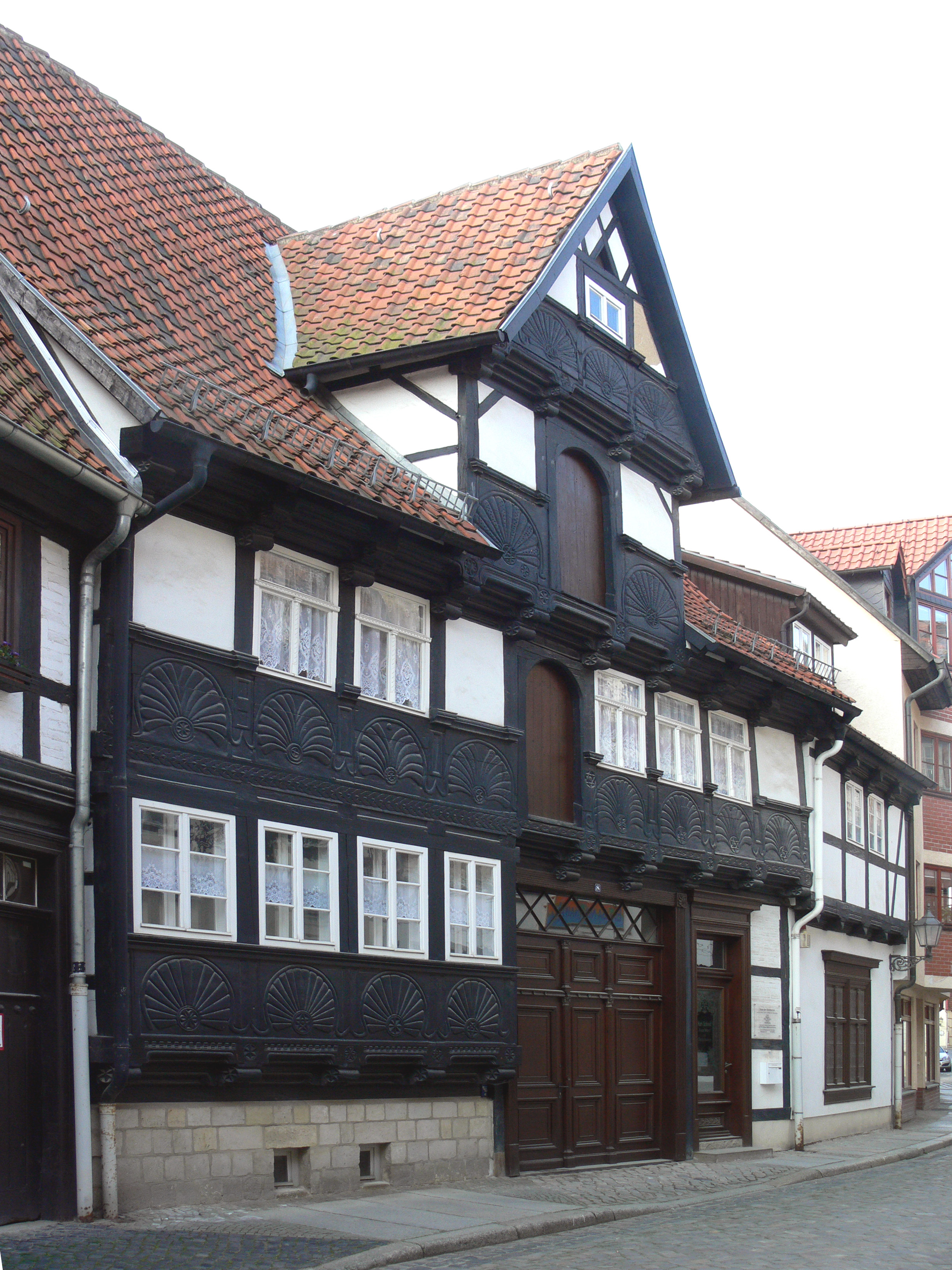
Half-timbered house

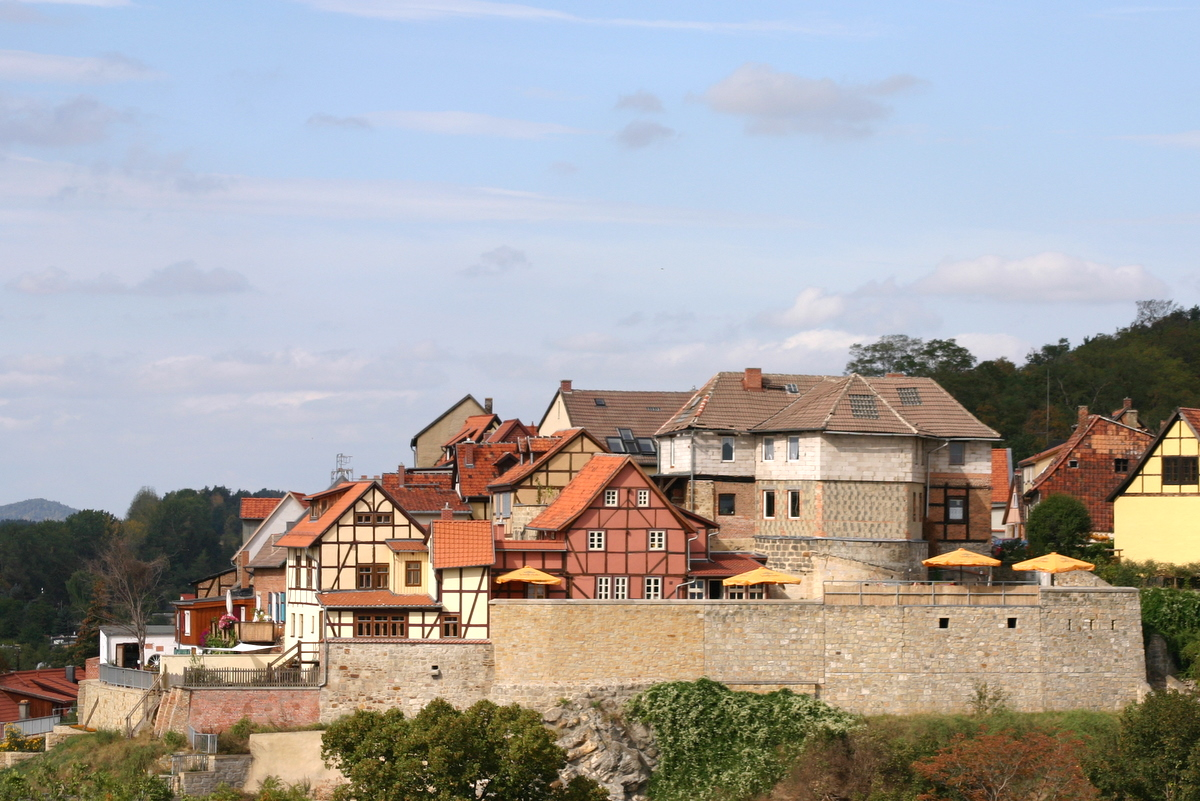
Münzenberg

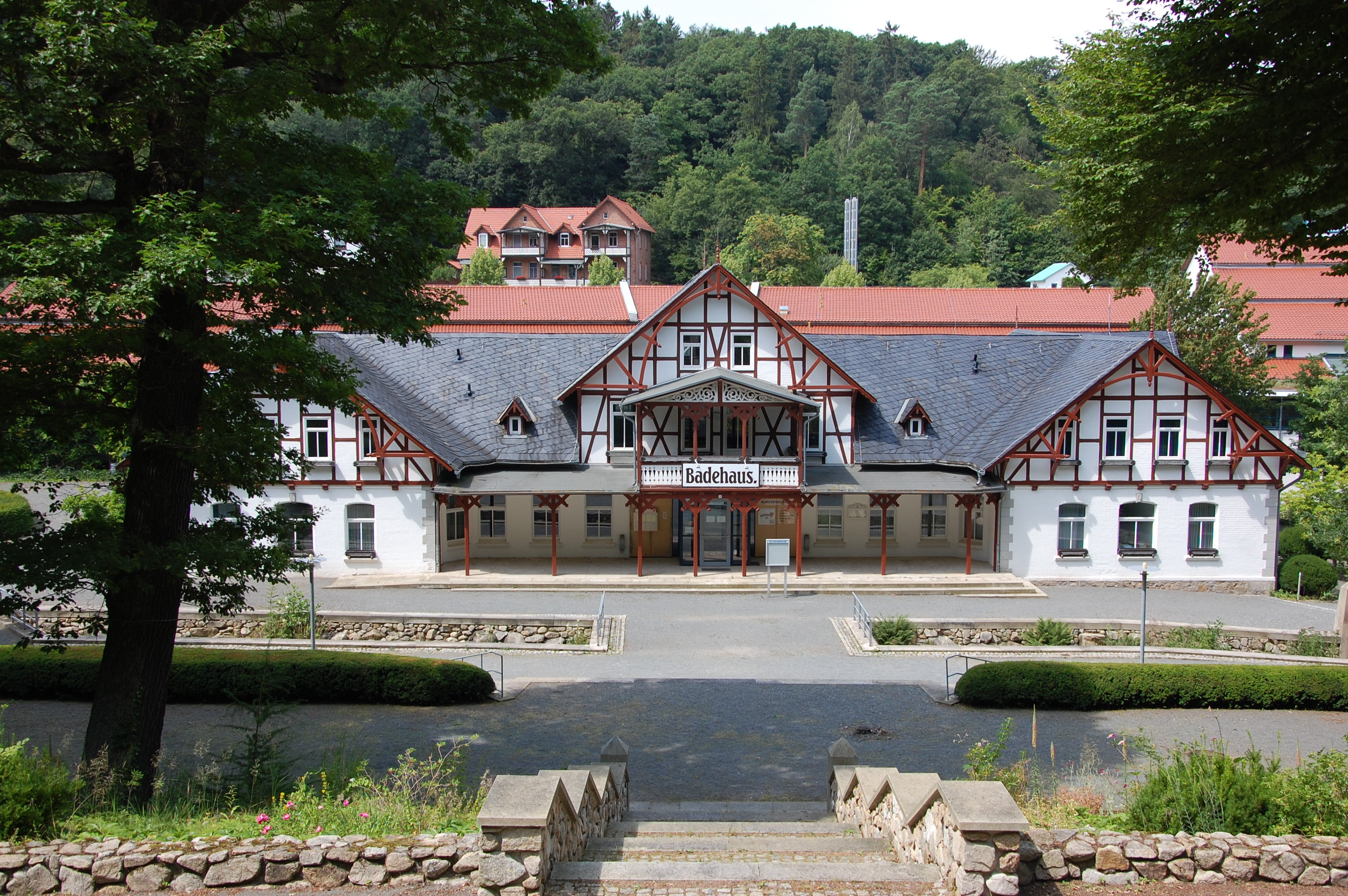
Spa Bad Suderode

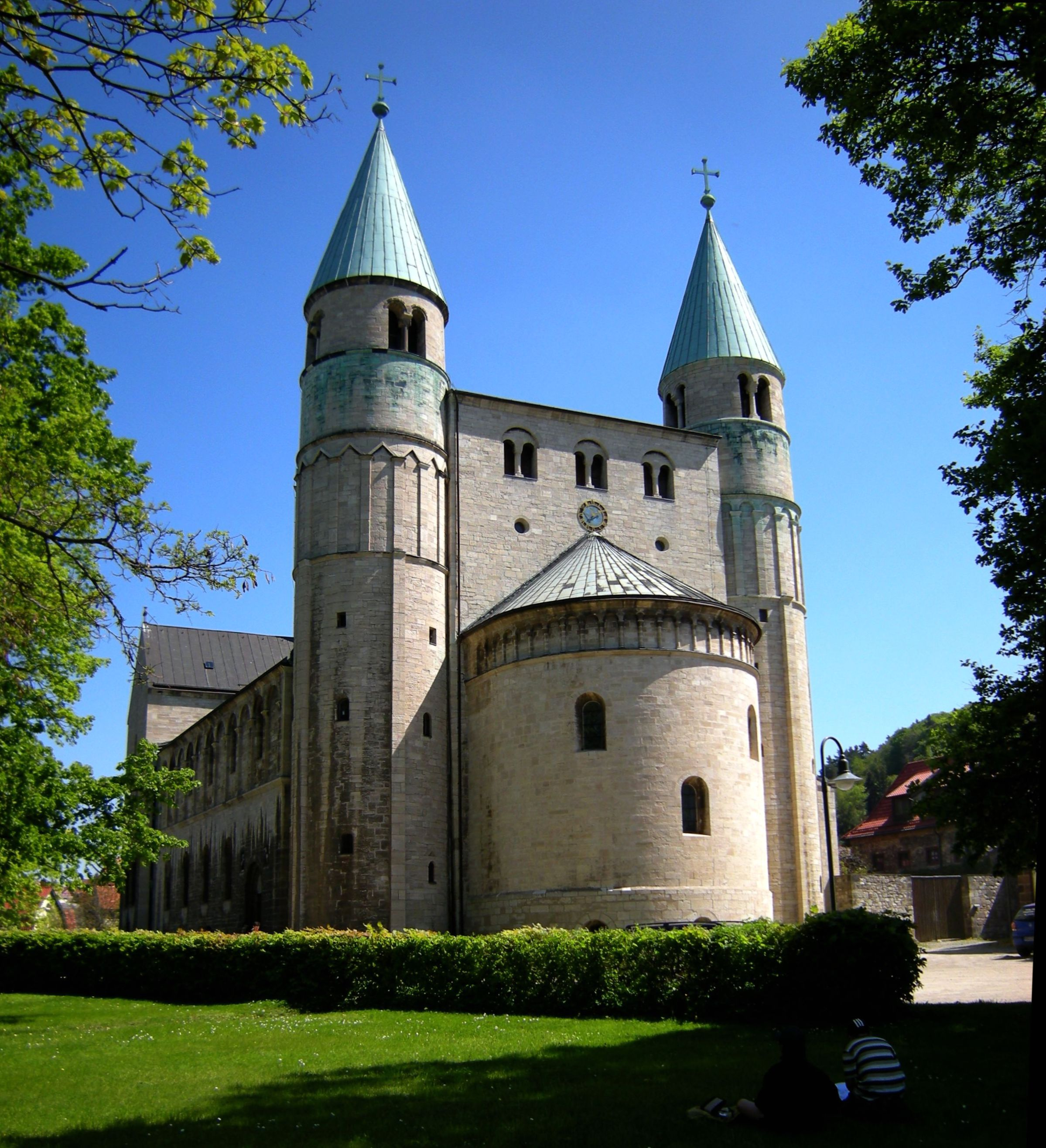
St Cyriacus Church Gernrode

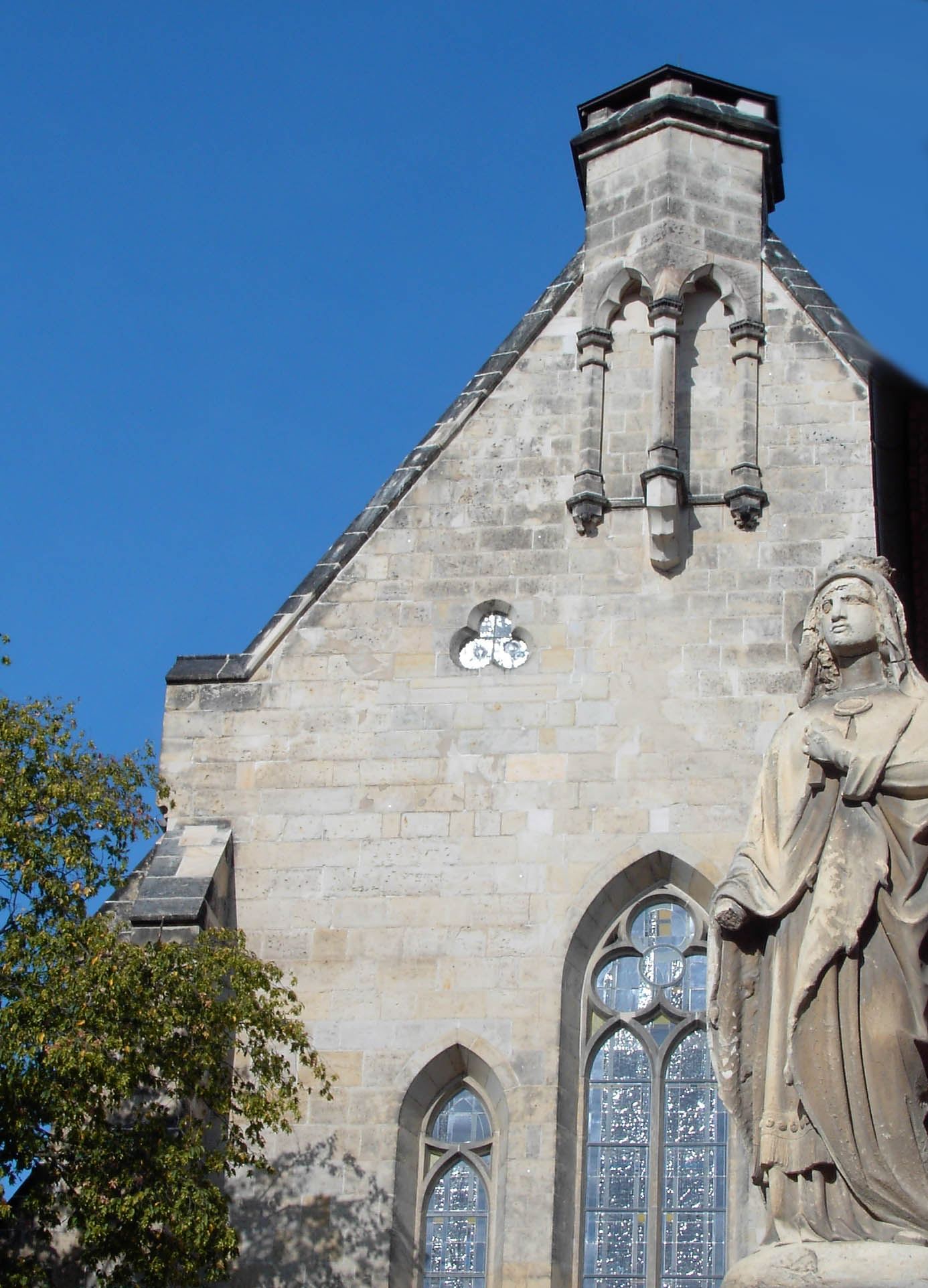
The church of Saint Matilda

== Infrastructure ==
=== Transport ===
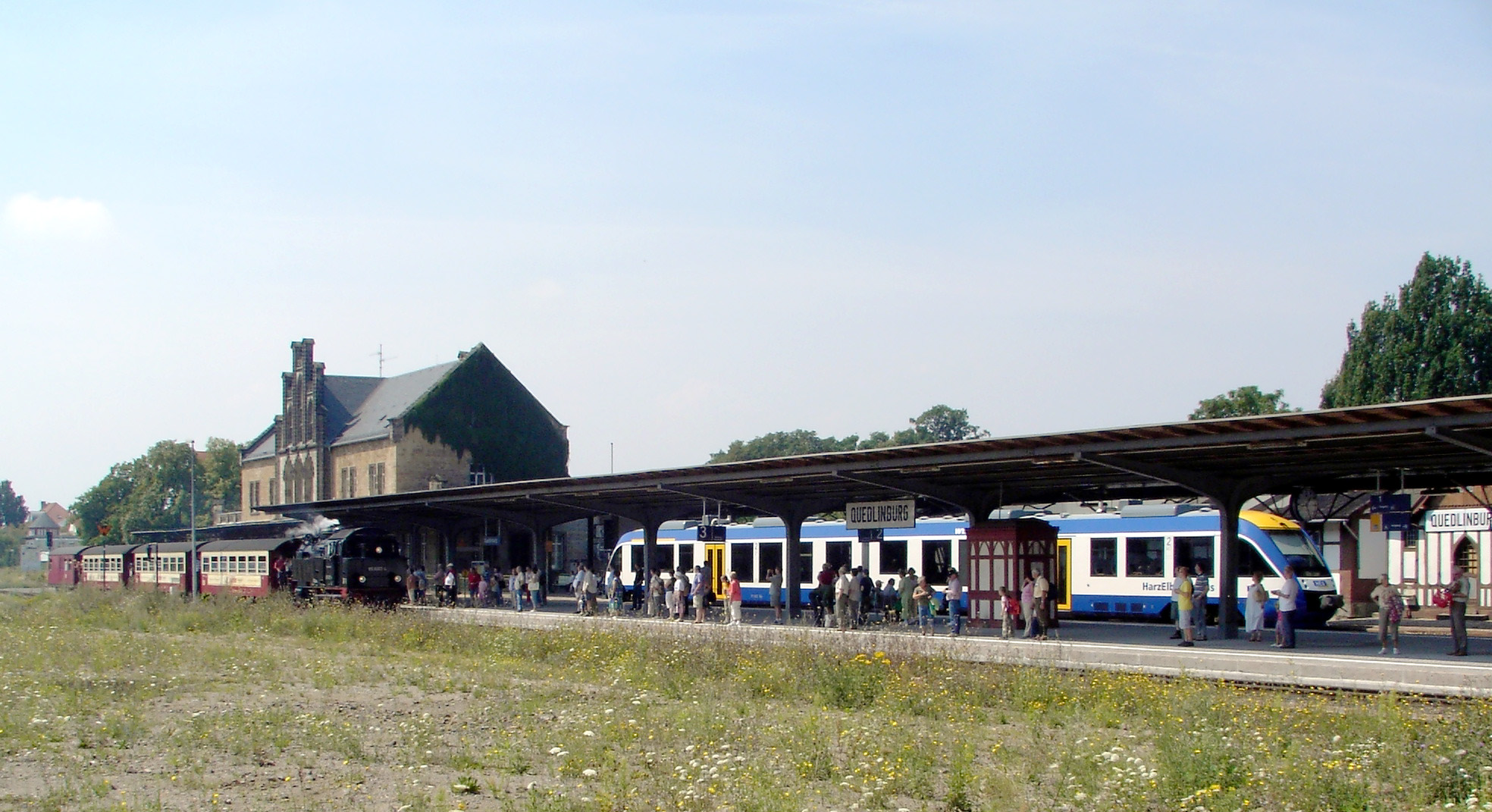
A narrow-gauge steam train of the Selke Valley Railway connects with a Transdev Harz-Berlin-Express train on the line from Magdeburg at Quedlinburg station.

==== Air ====
The nearest airports to Quedlinburg are Hannover, 120 kilometres (75 miles) northwest, and Leipzig/Halle Airport, 90 kilometres (56 miles) southeast. Much closer, but only served by a few airlines, is Magdeburg-Cochstedt. An airfield is located at Ballenstedt-Assmussstedt for general aviation.

==== Railway ====
Regional trains operated by Deutsche Bahn and the private Transdev company run on the standard-gauge Magdeburg–Thale line connecting Quedlinburg station with Magdeburg, Thale, and Halberstadt.

In 2006, the Selke Valley branch of the Harz Narrow Gauge Railways was extended into Quedlinburg from Gernrode, giving access via the historic steam-operated narrow-gauge railway to Alexisbad and the High Harz plateau.

==== Bus ====
Quedlinburg is connected by regional buses to the surrounding villages and small towns. Additionally, there are long-distance buses to Berlin.

== Media, literature, and film ==
The Mitteldeutsche Zeitung (Central German Newspaper) maintains a local newsroom in Quedlinburg. In addition, the newspapers SuperSonntag (SuperSunday), Wochenspiegel (Weekly Mirror), and Harzer Kreisblatt (Harz District Newspaper) are published locally.

The local public broadcaster is Mitteldeutscher Rundfunk (MDR; Central German Broadcasting), whose regional office is located in Halberstadt.

Regionalfernsehen Harz (RFH; Harz Regional Television) broadcasts on the local cable television network.

A number of novels have been set in Quedlinburg and the surrounding area, such as Wilhelm Raabe's Der Schüdderump. The first part of Theodor Fontane's novel Cécile (1887) takes place in Quedlinburg and Thale, as do the various novels of Dorothea Christiane Erxleben and Julius Wolff's The Robber Count: A Story of the Harz Country (1884). Other novels set in the area include Gerhard Beutel's Der Stadthauptmann von Quedlinburg (1972), Helga Glaesener's Du süße sanfte Mörderin (You Sweet, Gentle Murderess; 2000), and ten novels by Christian Amling about the fictional private investigator Irenäus Moll.

The 2018 award-winning board game The Quacks of Quedlinburg is set in a medieval market town like Quedlinburg.

Quedlinburg is the setting for the acclaimed 2016 film Frantz, serving as a quintessential small German town in the wake of WWI, home to a family who is reeling from the death of a son in the war.

Because of its historical architecture, Quedlinburg has been used as the backdrop for various film and television projects. Several episodes (64, 67—70, 76) of the series Ärger im Revier (Trouble in the Precinct) broadcast by RTL Zwei were filmed in Quedlinburg. From 2012 to 2017, the ARD daytime series Heiter bis tödlich: Alles Klara was filmed in the city and its vicinity, with 48 episodes over three seasons. The following films were partially filmed in Quedlinburg:

- 1938: Spiel im Sommerwind, director: Roger von Norman
- 1954: Pole Poppenspäler (Paul the Puppeteer), director: Arthur Pohl
- 1960: Fünf Patronenhülsen (Five Cartridge Cases), with Manfred Krug and Armin Mueller-Stahl, director: Frank Beyer
- 1964: Mir nach, Canaillen! (Follow Me, Plebs!), with Manfred Krug, director: Ralf Kirsten
- 1971: Polizeiruf 110, four episodes
- 1972: Nicht schummeln, Liebling! (Don't Cheat, Darling!), with Frank Schöbel, Chris Doerk, Christel Bodenstein, Dorit Gäbler, Rolf Herricht, director: Joachim Hasler
- 1972: Lützower, with Jürgen Reuter, director: Werner W. Wallroth
- 1974: Kasimir der Große (Casimir the Great), in church and castle yard, with 800 extras
- 1974: Hans Röckle und der Teufel (Hans Röckle and the Devil), director: Hans Kratzert
- 1975: Till Eulenspiegel, with Winfried Glatzeder, director: Rainer Simon
- 1979: Schneeweißchen und Rosenrot (Snow-White and Rose-Red), director: Siegfried Hartmann
- 1981: Zwei Zeilen, kleingedruckt (Две строчки мелким шрифтом; Two Lines, Small Print), director: Witali Melnikow
- 1982: Der lange Ritt zur Schule (The Long Ride to School), with Frank Träger and Iris Riffert, director: Rolf Losansky
- 1992: Wunderjahre (Years of Wonder), with Gudrun Landgrebe and Christian Müller-Stahl, director: Arend Agthe
- 2000: Bilderbuch Deutschland (Picturebook Germany), episode: Von Quedlinburg nach Halberstadt (From Quedlinburg to Halberstatt), director: Carla Hicks
- 2003: Pfarrer Braun (Father Brown), a German detective series with Ottfried Fischer, two episodes
- 2003: Wenn Weihnachten wahr wird (When Christmas Comes True), director: Sherry Hormann
- 2006: 7 Zwerge – Der Wald ist nicht genug (7 Dwarves – The Forest Is Not Enough) with Otto Waalkes, director: Sven Unterwaldt
- 2010: Goethe! with Moritz Bleibtreu and Alexander Fehling, director: Philipp Stölzl
- 2011: Der ganz große Traum (The Whole Big Dream) with Daniel Brühl, Burghart Klaußner and Thomas Thieme, Regie: Sebastian Grobler
- 2012: Der Medicus (The Physician), director: Philipp Stölzl
- 2013: Das kleine Gespenst (The Little Ghost) with Uwe Ochsenknecht, director: Alain Gsponer
- 2014: Till Eulenspiegel with Jacob Matschenz, director: Christian Theede
- 2015: Heidi with Anuk Steffen, Bruno Ganz and Quirin Agrippi, director: Alain Gsponer
- 2016: Frantz with Pierre Niney and Paula Beer, director: François Ozon
- 2016: Stadtlandliebe with Jessica Schwarz, Tom Beck and Uwe Ochsenknecht, director: Marco Kreuzpaintner
- 2020: Army of Thieves

== Notable people ==
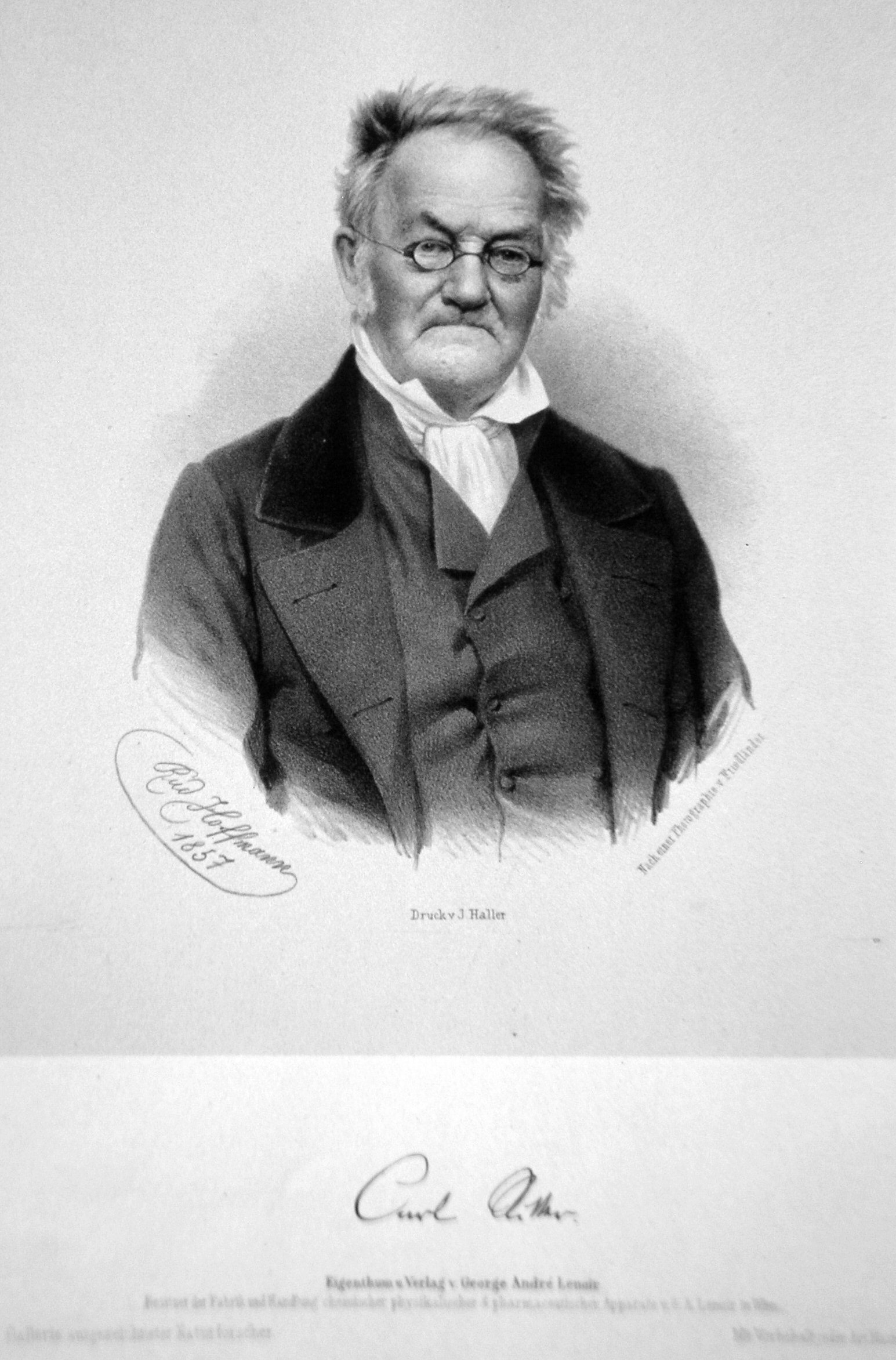
Carl Ritter (1857)

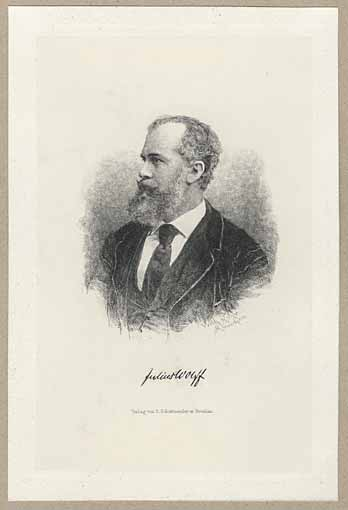
Julius Wolff

- Johann Gerhard (1582–1637), theologian, mean Denter representatives of Lutheran orthodoxy
- Andreas Werckmeister (1645–1706), German theorist, organist, organ examiner and composer
- Wilhelm Homberg (1652–1715), naturalist, born apparently during a trip in Batavia / Jakarta, but parents living in Quedlinburg
- Dorothea Erxleben (1715–1762), was the first female medical doctor in Germany
- Friedrich Gottlieb Klopstock (1724–1803), German poet and contemporary of Johann Wolfgang von Goethe
- Gottfried Christian Voigt (1740–1791), law clerk, antiquarian and influential writer about witchcraft
- Johann Christian Polycarp Erxleben (1744–1777), naturalist
- Johann Christoph Friedrich GutsMuths (1759–1839), father of German gymnastics
- Carl Ritter (1779–1859), founder of scientific geography
- Julius Wolff (1834–1910), Freeman, poet and writer
- Gustav Albert Schwalbe (1844–1916), anatomist and anthropologist
- Carl Schroeder (1848–1935), cellist, composer, conductor and Hofkapellmeister
- Georg Ay (1900–1997), politician (NSDAP), member of Reichstag 1933–1945
- Fritz Grasshoff (1913–1997), poet, painter, pop lyricist
- Bernhard Schrader (1931–2012), chemist, pioneer of experimental Raman and infrared spectroscopy
- Peter Kramer (born 1933), physicist
- Leander Haußmann (born 1959), film and theater director (e.g. "Sun Alley (film) Sonnenallee", "Herr Lehmann", "NVA")
- Petrik Sander (born 1960), football coach
- Petra Schersing (born Muller, 1965), sprinter and Olympic silver medalist
- Silvio Meier (1965–1992), activist killed by neo-Nazis
- Dagmar Hase (born 1969), swimmer and Olympic champion
- Sascha Ring (born 1978), electronic musician known as Apparat
- Sven Schulze (born 1979), German politician (CDU)

== See also ==
- Arndt'sche Caffee-Aufgussmaschine
- Arndt'sche Sturzmaschine
- Quedlinburger Kaffee-Aufguss-Maschine
