= Seberg (surname) =

Seberg is a surname. Notable people with the surname include:

- Gregor Seberg (born 1967), Austrian actor
- Jean Seberg (1938–1979), American actress
