= Annika Ernst =

German actress (born 1982)

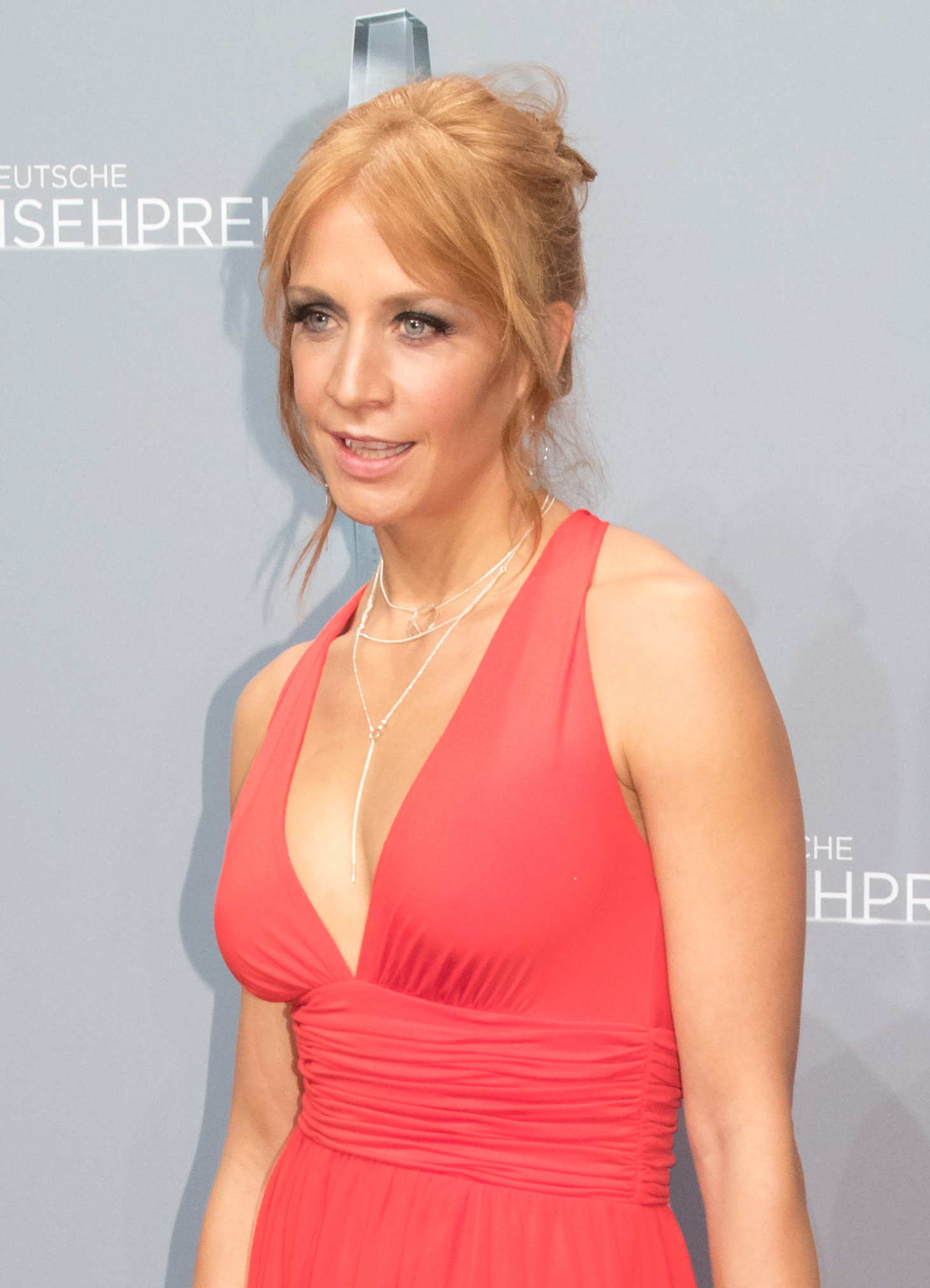
- Ernst at the German Television Awards 2018
- Born: 14 March 1979 (age 47); Schleswig, Schleswig-Holstein, West Germany
- Occupation: Actress

Annika Ernst (born 14 March 1979) is a German actress.

== Life and career ==
Ernst grew up in Georgsdorf in the County of Bentheim district. During her school days at Neuenhaus High School, she began to play in theatre. From 2001 to 2004, she studied acting at the Charlottenburg Acting School in Berlin. During that time, she also attended a three-month method acting workshop at the Actors Studio in New York City.

In 2009, she took part in Til Schweiger's talent show Mission Hollywood. She then worked in various cinema and television productions, including in Schweiger's film Rabbit Without Ears 2. From November 2013 to 2016, she played the leading female role in the ZDF series Herzensbrecher – Vater von vier Söhnen. Between 2015 and 2019, Ernst played the lead role as Commissioner Elena Lange along with Tom Beck in the Sat.1 series Einstein. She also played the senior public prosecutor Kirsten Grambach-Wachta alongside Bert Tischendorf in the RTL series Beck is back! from 2018 to 2019.

Since 2021 she has appeared alongside Hans Sigl and Mark Keller in the ZDF series Der Bergdoktor as the surgeon Dr. Johanna Rüdiger as well as in Kanzlei Berger on the same channel. Ernst lives with her daughter in Berlin.

== Filmography ==
=== Film ===
- 2005: Reife Leistung (short film)
- 2009: Maata Meren Alla
- 2009: Rabbit Without Ears 2
- 2013: Millionen
- 2015: Schmidts Katze

=== Television ===
- 2005: Fünf Sterne ("Versteckspiele")
- 2006: Großstadtrevier
- 2007: Arme Millionäre
- 2007: Die Masche mit der Liebe (television film)
- 2007: Two Funny – Die Sketch Comedy
- 2009: Leipzig Homicide ("Zahltag" and "Blutsbande")
- 2010: Stuttgart Homicide ("Einmal Schwein sein")
- 2010: Notruf Hafenkante ("Familienzirkus")
- 2010: SOKO Wismar ("Die Abrechnung")
- 2010–2011: Lena – Liebe meines Lebens
- 2011: Doctor's Diary ("Mist! Wieder einen Frosch erwischt!")
- 2011: Love Hurts (television film)
- 2011–2013: In aller Freundschaft
- 2012: Auf Herz und Nieren ("Die Maske")
- 2012: A Small Thing (television film)
- 2012: Letzte Spur Berlin ("Kontrollverlust")
- 2012: KRIMI.DE: Erfurt ("Lebensmüde")
- 2013–2015: Herzensbrecher – Vater von vier Söhnen
- 2013: Tür an Tür (television film)
- 2014: Binny and the Ghost ("Crash and Cash")
- 2015: Einstein (television film)
- 2016: Verführt – In den Armen eines Anderen (television film)
- 2017: Hochzeit in Rom (television film)
- 2017–2019: Einstein
- 2017: SOKO Kitzbühel ("Kein Weg zurück")
- 2018–2019: Beck is back!
- 2018: Cologne P.D. ("Blut ist dicker als Wasser")
- 2018: Bettys Diagnose ("Zweierlei Schmerz")
- 2019: Mord mit Ansage – Die Krimi-Impro Show
- 2020: Blutige Anfänger ("Nachtwache")
- 2020: Friesland ("Gegenströmung")
- 2021: Der Bergdoktor
- 2021: Kanzlei Berger
- 2021: SOKO Donau
