= Georg Ay =

German Nazi Party politician (1900–1997)

Reichstag Deputy
- In office 12 November 1933 – 8 May 1945

Landtag of Prussia Deputy
- In office 24 April 1932 – 14 October 1933

Personal details
- Born: 9 June 1900 Quedlinburg, Province of Saxony, Kingdom of Prussia, German Empire
- Died: 1 February 1997 (aged 96) Linz am Rhein, West Germany
- Party: Nazi Party
- Occupation: Businessman

Military service
- Allegiance: German Empire
- Branch/service: Imperial German Army
- Years of service: 1915–1918

Georg Ay (9 June 1900 – 1 February 1997) was a German Nazi Party official and politician. He was a deputy in the Landtag of Prussia and the Reichstag. In 1957, he was convicted of manslaughter for killing a deserter in the closing days of the Second World War.

== Early life ==
Ay was born in Quedlinburg and was educated through Oberrealschule there and in Halberstadt. He volunteered for military service with the Imperial German Army in 1915 and fought in the First World War through 1918. After the war, he began a commercial apprenticeship and, in 1921, he took over his father's business in Quedlinburg.

== Nazi Party career ==
Ay joined the Nazi Party on 1 December 1929 (membership number 167,525). He advanced to the position of Ortsgruppenleiter (local group leader) in 1930 and to Kreisleiter (county leader) of Quedlinburg-Ballenstedt in 1931. At the 24 April 1932 Prussian state election, Ay was elected to the Landtag of Prussia and served until its dissolution in October 1933. That year, he was elected to the city council of Quedlinburg, holding that seat until 1935. From November 1933 until the fall of the Nazi regime in May 1945, Ay was a deputy of the Reichstag from electoral constituency 10 (Magdeburg). In addition, Ay served as the deputy president of the Halberstadt Chamber of Industry and Commerce, the vice president of the Chamber of Commerce in Gau Magdeburg-Anhalt, and as a Reichswirtschaftgericht (Reich economic judge).

== Post-war prosecution ==
After the end of the Second World War, Ay was interned and underwent denazification proceedings in Detmold. On 18 March 1957, he was convicted of manslaughter involving an alleged deserter on 17 April 1945, and was sentenced to four years in prison by the district court in Essen. Ay died in Linz am Rhein in February 1997.

== Sources ==
- Information about Georg Ay in the Reichstag database
- Stockhorst, Erich (1985). 5000 Köpfe: Wer War Was im 3. Reich. Arndt. ISBN 978-3-887-41116-9.
