= Why Men Don't Listen and Women Can't Read Maps =

- Directed by: Leander Haußmann
- Written by: Rochus Hahn; Alexander Stever
- Produced by: Oliver Berben; Herman Weigel
- Starring: Benno Fürmann; Jessica Schwarz; Matthias Matschke; Uwe Ochsenknecht; Nadja Becker; Katja Flint; Thomas Kretschmann; Sascha Schmitz
- Cinematography: Tilman Büttner
- Edited by: Peter R. Adam
- Music by: James Last
- Distributed by: Constantin Film
- Release date: 29 November 2007
- Running time: 103 minutes
- Country: Germany
- Language: German
- Box office: $15,026,914

Why Men Don't Listen and Women Can't Read Maps (German: Warum Männer nicht zuhören und Frauen schlecht einparken, literally "Why Men Don't Listen and Women Park Badly") is a 2007 German comedy film directed by Leander Haußmann.

== Plot ==
The successful lawyer and ladies' man Jan (Benno Fürmann) observes through a window of his apartment, how a car scrapes his red convertible. The driver is the equally successful publishing assistant Katrin (Jessica Schwarz). Despite initial mutual accusations, the two soon become a couple. Then the pregnant couple Rüdiger (Jan's brother) and Melanie are introduced. Subsequently, different hypotheses explaining the behavior of men and women are offered.
