= Einstein (German TV series) =

2017 German television series

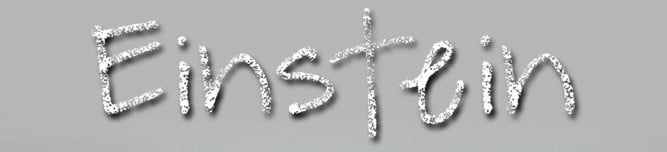
- Genre: Police procedural; Crime; Comedy drama
- Based on: Einstein by: Martin Ritzenhoff; Matthias Dinter
- Written by: Martin Ritzenhoff; Matthias Dinter
- Directed by: Thomas Jahn; Dominic Müller; Felix Stienz; Oliver Dommenget
- Starring: Tom Beck; Annika Ernst; Rolf Kanies; Haley Louise Jones
- Composer: Karim Sebastian Elias
- Country of origin: Germany
- Original language: German
- No. of seasons: 3
- No. of episodes: 32

Production
- Executive producers: Michael Souvignier; Dominik Frankowski
- Running time: 42–47 minutes
- Production company: Zeitsprung Pictures

Original release
- Network: Sat.1; Sat.1 emotions
- Release: January 5, 2017 – March 17, 2019

Einstein is a German police procedural dramedy television series that is based on 2015 film of the same name, written by Martin Ritzenhoff and Matthias Dinter.

The television series premiered on Sat.1 emotions on January 5, 2017 and has sold to over 100 territories including a hit in Spain and Portugal on AXN and also in Czech Republic on FilmBox.

On March 29, 2019, Sat.1 canceled the series after three seasons.

== Plot ==
Felix Winterberg, unknown great-great-grandson of Albert Einstein, is the youngest professor of theoretical physics at Ruhr University Bochum. Winterberg has inherited the genius of Einstein and suffers from the deadly health of Huntington's chorea, which gives him a remaining life expectancy of about seven years. He must help Kriminalkommissarin (Police commissioner) Elena Lange as an independent consultant under the direction of Kriminaloberkommissar Stefan Tremmel in the investigation of murder cases in order to not end up in prison for violations of the Narcotics Act (unauthorized amphetamine).

== Cast ==
Character	Actor	Occupation	Season		
Character	Actor	Occupation	1	2	3
Prof. Dr. Felix „Einstein“ Winterberg	Tom Beck	Professor at Ruhr University Bochum, independent consultant at Criminal Police in Bochum	Main	Main	Main
Elena Lange	Annika Ernst	Detective at Criminal Police in Bochum	Main	Main	Main
Stefan Tremmel	Rolf Kanies	Detective chief at Criminal Police in Bochum	Main	Main	Main
Kirsten Maybach	Haley Louise Jones	Crime scene investigator	Main	Main	Main
Dr. Lee Kwon	Yung Ngo	Friend of Felix Winterbeg	Recurring	Recurring	Recurring
Leon Lange	Paul Bohse	Son of Elena Lange	Recurring	Recurring	Recurring
Dr. Rössler	Christian Hockenbrink	Doctor of Felix Winterberg and Leon Lange	Recurring	Recurring	Recurring
Prof. Dr. Constanze Winterberg	Angela Roy	Mother of Felix Winterberg, Dean at Ruhr University Bochum (Season 2)	Recurring	Recurring	Recurring
Prof. Dr. Stefan Jäger	Reiner Schöne	Former professor of Felix Winterberg	Recurring	Recurring	
Sabine Steenken	Jennifer Poppek	Secretary/personal assistant of dean, Informer of Stefan Jäger	Recurring	Recurring	
Prof. Dr. Oliver Kohaupt	Hubertus Hartmann	Dean at Ruhr University Bochum, Informer of Stefan Jäger	Recurring		
Andreas „Andy“	Jesse Albert	Detective	Guest	Recurring	Recurring
Julia Weigert	Laura Berlin	BKA Agent	Guest	Recurring	Recurring
Nic Beuser	Wayne Carpendale	Internal investigator		Recurring	
Teresa Lange	Merle Collet	Sister of Elena Lange, Aunt of Leon Lange	Guest		Recurring

== Episodes ==
=== Season 1 (2017) ===
No. overall	No. in season	Title	Original air date (Sat.1 emotions)	Original air date (Sat.1)
1	1	"Ballistik"	January 5, 2017	January 10, 2017
2	2	"ABC"	January 5, 2017	January 10, 2017
3	3	"Schwerkraft"	January 12, 2017	January 17, 2017
4	4	"H2O"	January 12, 2017	January 17, 2017
5	5	"Mikrowellen"	January 19, 2017	January 24, 2017
6	6	"Elvis lebt"	January 19, 2017	January 24, 2017
7	7	"Meganewton"	January 26, 2017	January 31, 2017
8	8	"Thermodynamik"	January 26, 2017	January 31, 2017
9	9	"Magnetismus"	February 2, 2017	February 7, 2017
10	10	"E.M.P."	February 2, 2017	February 7, 2017

=== Season 2 (2018) ===
No. overall	No. in season	Title	Original air date (Sat.1 emotions)	Original air date (Sat.1)
11	1	"Optik"	February 12, 2018	February 13, 2018
12	2	"Aerodynamik"	February 12, 2018	February 13, 2018
13	3	"Expansion"	February 19, 2018	February 20, 2018
14	4	"Strömung"	February 19, 2018	February 20, 2018
15	5	"Amnesie"	February 26, 2018	February 27, 2018
16	6	"Dr. Rössler"	February 26, 2018	February 27, 2018
17	7	"Anaphylaxie"	March 5, 2018	March 6, 2018
18	8	"Kompression"	March 5, 2018	March 6, 2018
19	9	"Isobaren"	March 12, 2018	March 13, 2018
20	10	"Kollaps"	March 12, 2018	March 13, 2018

=== Season 3 (2019) ===
No. overall	No. in season	Title	Original air date (Sat.1 emotions)	Original air date (Sat.1)
21	1	"Fallout (1)"	January 13, 2019	January 7, 2019
22	2	"Fallout (2)"	January 13, 2019	January 14, 2019
23	3	"Siedepunkt"	January 20, 2019	January 21, 2019
24	4	"K.I."	January 27, 2019	January 28, 2019
25	5	"Oxidation"	February 3, 2019	February 4, 2019
26	6	"Skin-Effekt"	February 10, 2019	February 11, 2019
27	7	"Gamma-Hydroxy-Butansäure"	February 17, 2019	February 18, 2019
28	8	"Prisma"	February 24, 2019	February 25, 2019
29	9	"Antischall"	March 3, 2019	March 4, 2019
30	10	"Kybernetik"	March 10, 2019	March 11, 2019
31	11	"Extension"	March 17, 2019	March 18, 2019
32	12	"Infrarot"	March 17, 2019	March 18, 2019

== Reception ==
=== Ratings ===
No. in series	Air date (Sat.1)	Viewers (in millions)		Share	
No. in series	Air date (Sat.1)	all	14–49 years	all	14–49 years
1	January 10, 2017	2.56	1.14	7.7%	10.8%
2	January 10, 2017	2.31	1.11	7.4%	10.5%
3	January 17, 2017	2.36	1.20	7.2%	11.3%
4	January 17, 2017	2.39	1.26	7.7%	12.2%
5	January 24, 2017	2.00	0.99	6.0%	9.2%
6	January 24, 2017	2.07	1.09	6.6%	10.2%
7	January 31, 2017	2.43	1.11	7.5%	10.4%
8	January 31, 2017	2.28	1.11	7.3%	10.3%
9	February 7, 2017	2.34	1.20	7.0%	10.6%
10	February 7, 2017	2.28	1.13	7.2%	10.2%
11	February 13, 2018	1.94	0.96	5.9%	9.2%
12	February 13, 2018	1.97	1.00	6.4%	10.1%
13	February 20, 2018	1.78	TBA	TBA	9.0%
14	February 20, 2018	1.57	TBA	TBA	7.2%
15	February 27, 2018	1.68	0.91	5.0%	8.3%
16	February 27, 2018	1.63	0.82	5.4%	8.2%
17	March 6, 2018	1.42	0.69	4.3%	6.6%
18	March 6, 2018	1.42	0.72	4.5%	6.9%
19	March 13, 2018	1.84	0.93	5.7%	9.2%
20	March 13, 2018	1.68	0.81	5.6%	8.3%

=== Awards and nominations ===
Year	Association	Category	Nominee(s)	Result	Ref.
2018	Jupiter Award	Best TV series (National)	Season 1	Nominated	
2019	Jupiter Award	Best TV series (National)	Season 2	Nominated	

== Adaptations ==
=== American adaptation ===
In April 2025, The American series adaptation was ordered by CBS, starring Matthew Gray Gubler as Lewis Einstein. The pilot was written by Andy Breckman and directed by Randy Zisk. The series is set to premiere on February 12, 2027.

=== Czech adaptation ===
In May 2021, an adaptation by Prima televize Einstein – Případy nesnesitelného génia starring Vojtěch Kotek started broadcasting.

=== Slovak adaptation ===
In February 2023, an adaptation by TV Joj Einstein starring Juraj Loj started broadcasting.

== See also ==
- List of German television series
