= Ill-Young Kim =

German actor, comedian, and musician

- Born: 13 May 1973 (age 53); Cologne, West Germany
- Occupations: Actor, musician, stand-up comedian
- Years active: 1999-present
- Website: www.illyoungkim.de

Ill-Young Kim (Korean: 김일영; born 13 May 1973) is a German actor, comedian, and musician of Korean descent.

== Selected filmography ==
Year	Title	Role	Notes
1999	St. Pauli Night		
2000	Perfect Sight	Pit Sun	
2003–2005	Nachtschicht	Floyd Kim	TV series, 3 episodes
2008	Fast Track: No Limits		
2009	Ninja Assassin		
2010	The Hairdresser		
2012	The Revenge of the Whore		
