= Beck is Back! =

German television series

- Starring: Bert Tischendorf; Andreja Schneider; Annika Ernst; René Steinke
- Country of origin: Germany
- Original language: German
- No. of seasons: 1
- No. of episodes: 20

Production
- Producer: UFA Fiction
- Running time: 45 min

Original release
- Network: RTL Television
- Release: January 30, 2018

Beck is back! (stylized as BECK is back!) is a German television series that premiered on January 30, 2018, on RTL Television.

== Plot ==
Although Hannes Beck (Bert Tischendorf) studied law at some point, the fourfold father never had the need to apply his knowledge to solid work. This changes abruptly when his wife, the prosecutor Kirsten (Annika Ernst), cheats on him with her colleague (René Steinke). Hannes moves out and takes the kids with him. For the first time in his life he has to go to work properly and inevitably takes a job as a public defense lawyer. His 54-year-old domestic help Yasmina (Andreja Schneider) was a judge in her old homeland of Croatia. Without further ado, he hires her as a lawyer's assistant. Patent, clever and absolutely loyal she helps him with his difficult cases. Hannes' private life has its ups and downs: while his ex-wife wants to take the kids away from him, he meets his former fellow student Susanne (Julia Dietze) at court, and gradually develops feelings for her.

== See also ==
- List of German television series
