= Julius Wolff (writer) =

German writer & poet (1834–1910)

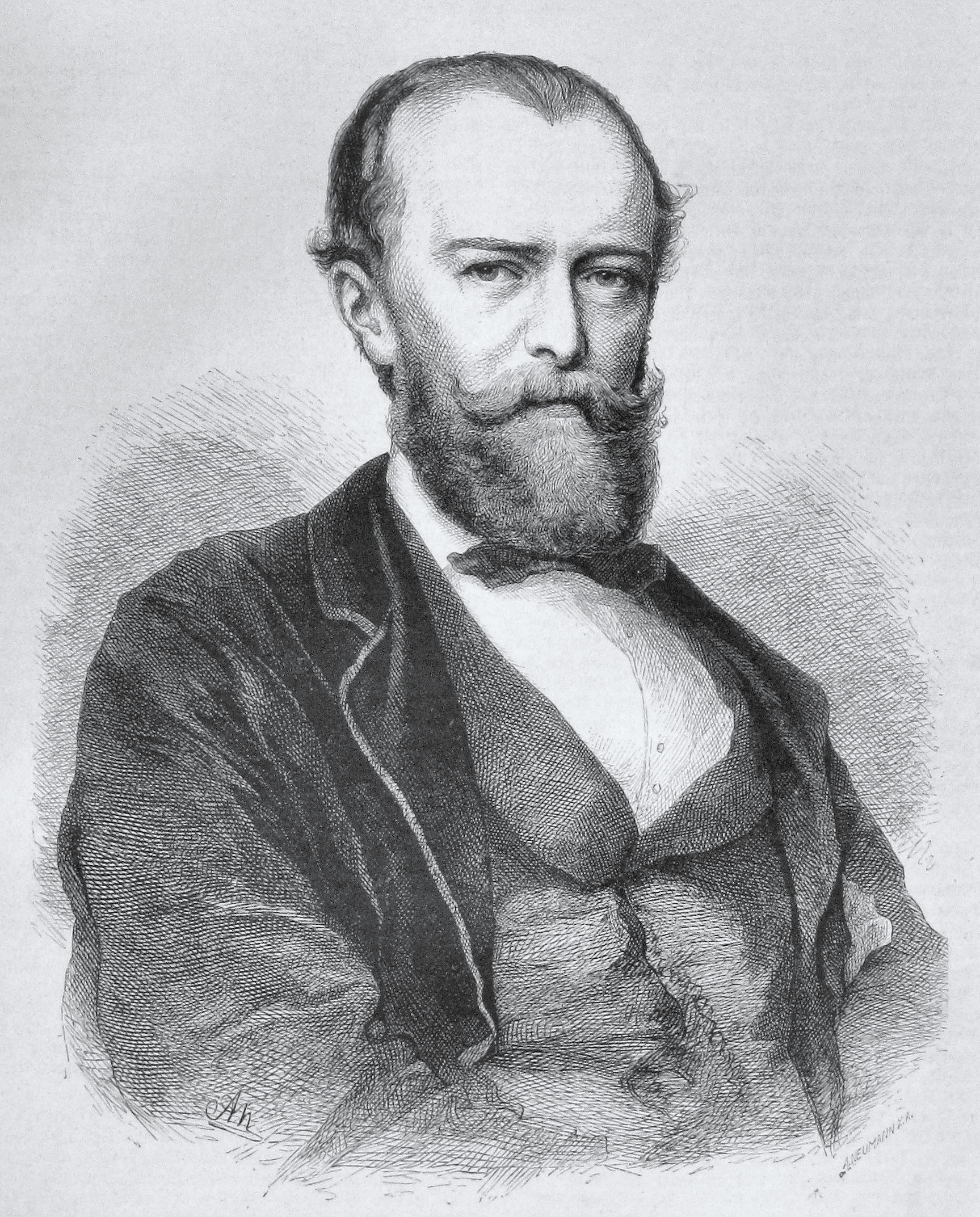
- Born: 16 September 1834; Quedlinburg, Germany
- Died: 3 June 1910 (aged 75); Charlottenburg, Germany

Julius Wolff (16 September 1834 – 3 June 1910) was a German writer and poet. He enjoyed great popularity in Germany during the Gründerzeit. He was influenced by Joseph Victor von Scheffel. Lieder composer Pauline Volkstein (1849-1925) set his texts to music.

== Selected works ==
- Der wilde Jäger (1877)
