= Unschuldig =

German television series

- Starring: Alexandra Neldel
- Country of origin: Germany

Unschuldig is a German television series.

== See also ==
- List of German television series
