= Alexandra Neldel =

German actress (born 1976)

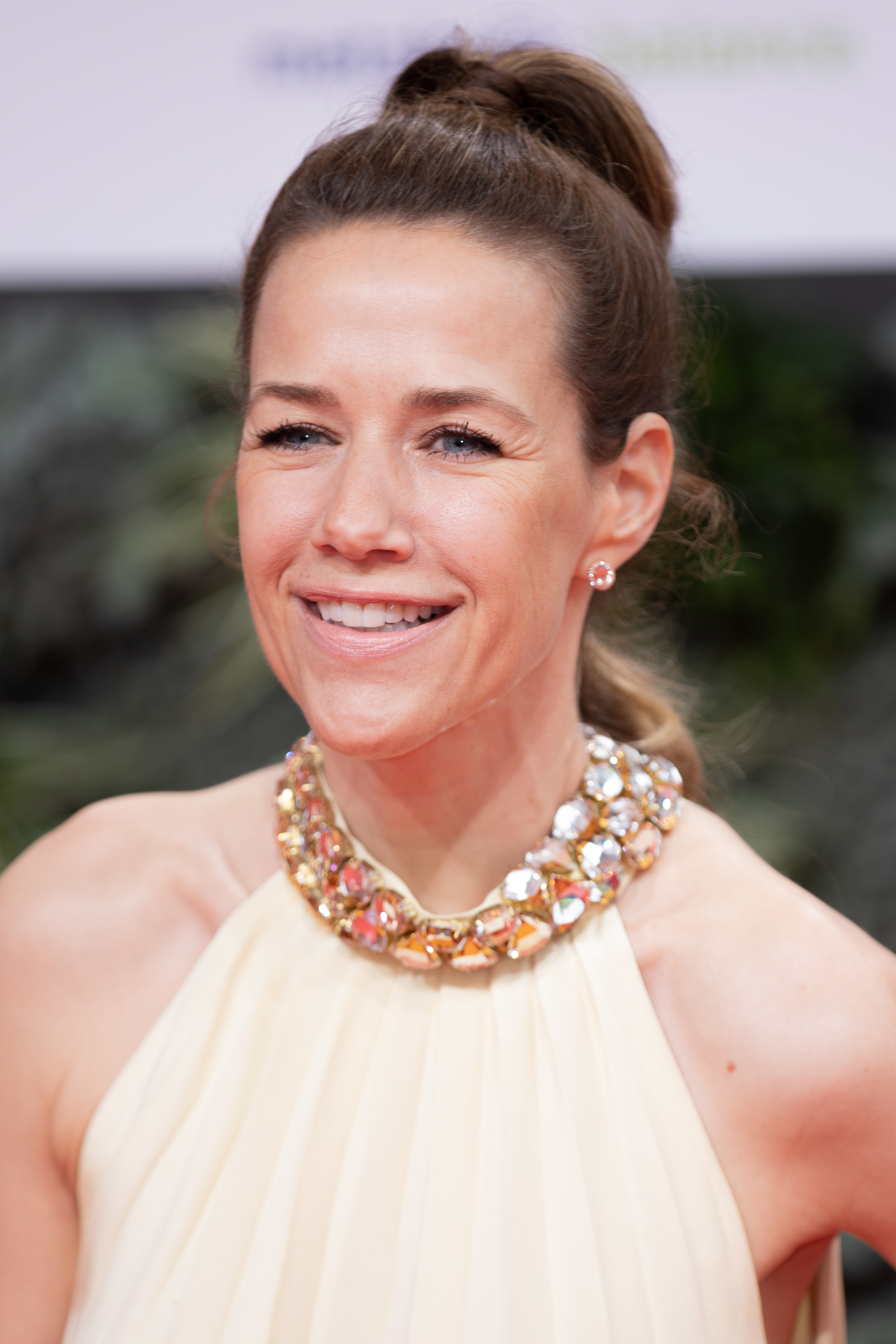
- Neldel in 2019
- Born: 11 February 1976 (age 50); West Berlin, West Germany
- Occupation: Actress
- Years active: 1996–present

Alexandra Monika Neldel (born 11 February 1976) is a German actress from Berlin.

== Career ==
Neldel worked as a dental assistant before she was discovered by the boss of a Berlin casting agency during a polo competition. He helped her audition for daily soap opera Gute Zeiten, schlechte Zeiten and Neldel, barely experienced in acting, immediately landed the role of Katja Wettstein. After leaving GZSZ in 1999 Neldel starred in several German motion pictures and TV films, including Lammbock, Samba in Mettmann and Emmy-winning Berlin, Berlin.

In 2005 Neldel made her breakthrough as Lisa Plenske, the leading role in the Sat.1 telenovela Verliebt in Berlin. She decided to leave the series after the final episode of season one.

== Filmography ==
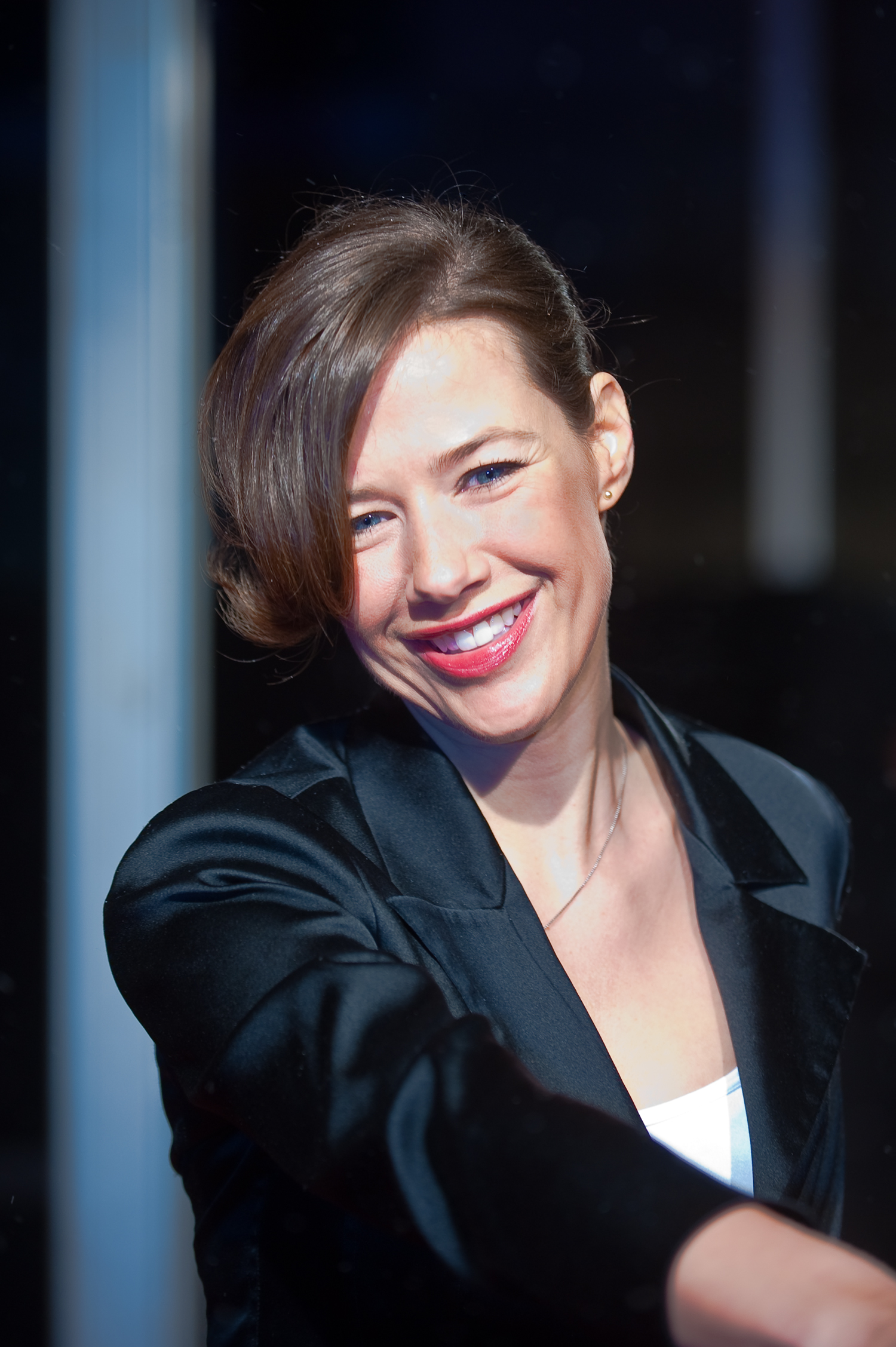
Alexandra Neldel in 2010

=== Cinema ===
- 1999: Bang Boom Bang
- 2000: Flashback
- 2000: Erkan & Stefan
- 2001: Lammbock
- 2003: Der letzte Lude
- 2003: They've Got Knut
- 2004: Samba in Mettmann
- 2004: A2 Racer
- 2005: Barefoot
- 2006: Goldene Zeiten
- 2007: Messy Christmas
- 2008: Melodies of Spring
- 2012: The Treasure Knights and the Secret of Melusina
- 2012: Nothing but Women

=== TV films ===
- 1998: Girl's Trap – Death Comes Online
- 1998: Das Miststück
- 1999: Doggy Dog – Eine total verrückte Hundeentführung
- 2000: Heimliche Küsse – Verliebt in ein Sex-Symbol
- 2001: Rent a Baby
- 2001: Schwarz & McMurphy
- 2002: Rosamunde Pilcher: Wenn nur noch Liebe zählt
- 2004: Nachtschicht – Vatertag
- 2005: Scharf wie Chili
- 2005: Comedy-Schiff (sketch comedy)
- 2006: Die ProSieben Märchenstunde – Der Froschkönig
- 2007: Zodiak – Der Horoskop-Mörder (4-part miniseries)
- 2009: Savvy Lena (3-part miniseries)
- 2009: Killerjagd. Töte mich, wenn du kannst
- 2010: Killerjagd. Schrei, wenn du dich traust
- 2010: The Whore
- 2010: Glückstreffer – Anne und der Boxer
- 2011: Bollywood lässt Alpen glühen
- 2011: Buschpiloten küsst man nicht
- 2012: The Revenge of the Whore
- 2012: Das Vermächtnis der Wanderhure
- 2013: Der Minister
- 2021: Herzkino.Märchen: Die Sterntaler des Glücks

=== Series ===
- 1996–1999: Gute Zeiten, schlechte Zeiten
- 2000–2001: OP ruft Dr. Bruckner (5 episodes)
- 2002: Ein Fall für zwei (episode 198)
- 2003: SOKO 5113 (episode 293)
- 2004–2005: Berlin, Berlin (3. – 4. season)
- 2005–2007: Verliebt in Berlin
- 2008: Unschuldig

=== Dubbing ===
- 2000: Titan A.E.
- 2001: Dr. Dolittle 2
- 2006: Open Season
- 2010: Tangled

== Awards ==
- 1997: Bravo Otto in Silver in the category TV-Star female
- 1998: Bravo Otto in Silver in the category TV-Star female
- 2005: Undine Award – Best Young Supporting Actress in a film for Barefoot
- 2005: Maxim – Woman of the Year
- 2005: German Television Award – Best daily series as a member of the crew of Verliebt in Berlin
- 2005: Bravo Otto in Silver in the category TV-Star female
- 2006: Rose d'Or – Best European Soap as a member of the crew of Verliebt in Berlin
- 2006: Rose d'Or – Beste Soap-Actress for Verliebt in Berlin
- 2006: Berliner Bär (BZ-Kulturpreis) in the category TV
- 2008: Bavarian TV award – Best Actress in the series category for Unschuldig
- 2011: Nomination for the German Television Award in the category Best Actress for The Whore
