= Doc meets Dorf =

- Starring: Inez Bjørg David; Bert Tischendorf; Steve Windolf; Bettina Lamprecht; Sebastian Fräsdorf; Matthias Bollwerk; Nikola Kastner; Linda Chang
- Country of origin: Germany
- Original language: German
- No. of seasons: 1
- No. of episodes: 8

Production
- Producer: UFA Fiction

Original release
- Network: RTL Television
- Release: 22 August – 17 October 2013

Doc meets Dorf is a German television series that premiered on 22 August 2013 on RTL Television.

== Plot ==
Cows, guys and disasters: Inez Bjørg David plays the top surgeon Dr. Fritzi Frühling. As the city dweller loses her job and the boyfriend marries another, an inheritance comes just right: she becomes the owner of an old farm in Kanada. But Kanada is in this case just a dull Kaff in Brandenburg. So Fritzi travels there to sell the farm, but has the bill made without the villagers who have long been looking for a new country doctor. In addition to cows Fritzi meets one or the other handsome man. The choice is next to the nature boy Kai (Steve Windolf) just her ex-boyfriend Falk (Bert Tischendorf), who has settled here as a veterinarian.

== See also ==
- List of German television series
