= Tom Beck (actor) =

German actor, singer, and entrepreneur

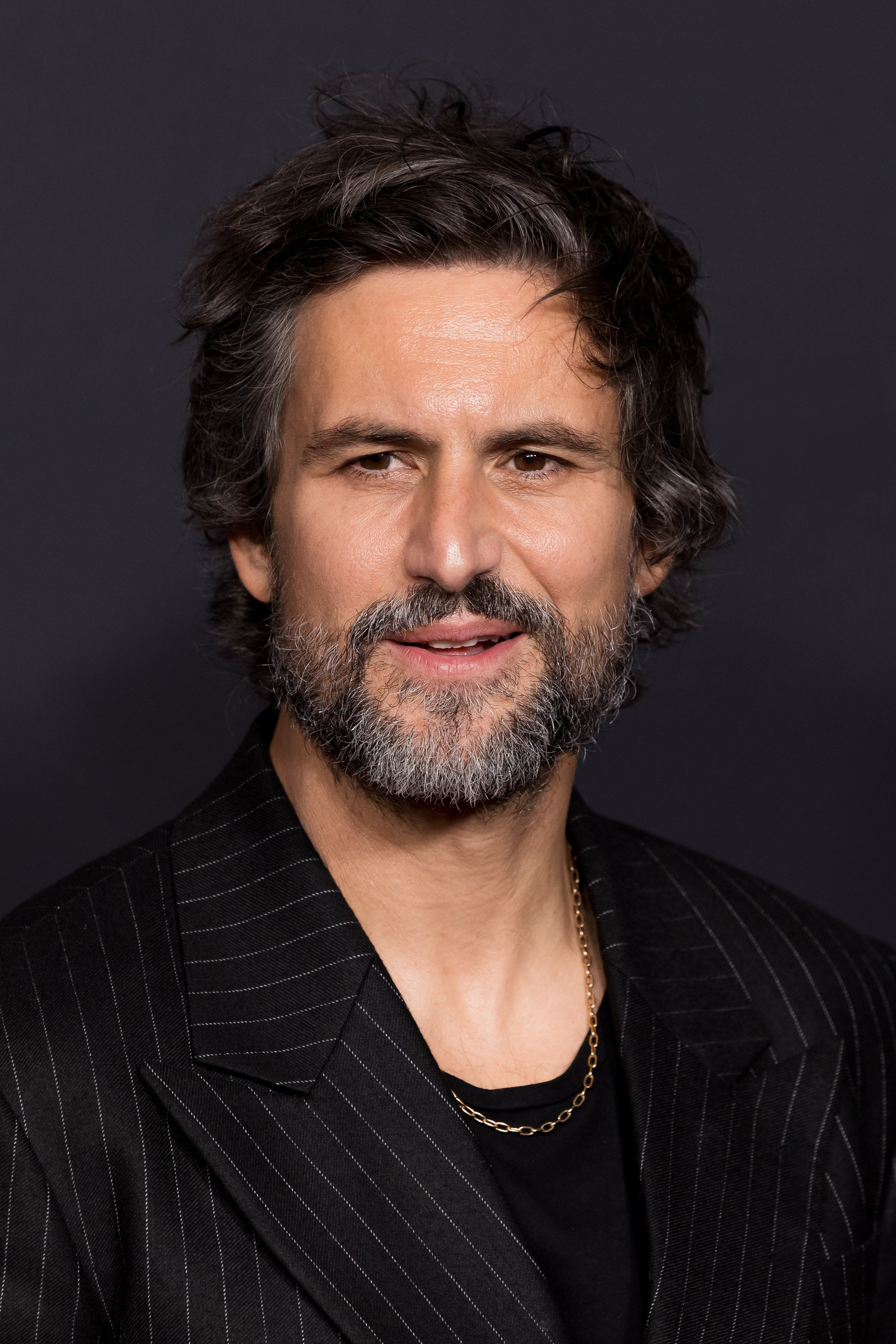
- Born: Thomas Helmut Beck; 26 February 1978 (age 48); Nuremberg, West Germany
- Occupations: Singer-songwriter, actor
- Years active: 2004–present
- Musical career
- Genres: Pop, rock, pop-rock
- Instruments: Vocals, guitar
- Years active: 2011–present

Thomas Helmut "Tom" Beck (born 26 February 1978) is a German actor, singer, and entrepreneur.

== Early life ==
Beck finished high school in Neues Gymnasium Nürnberg. He then attended the Bavarian Theatre Academy in Munich, under the Musical degree programme, where he was trained musically and in dancing, and finished with his thesis, Beck-Stage.

== Career ==
Beck played and sang in two bands; he left King Schlayer, his second, in 2001 after the second year.

After receiving his award at the National Singing Competition in 2001, Beck was engaged as a performer in musicals between 2005 and 2007. Since 2004 he appeared in various television productions. From autumn 2008 to the end of 2013, Beck was seen in the action series Alarm für Cobra 11 – Die Autobahnpolizei alongside Erdoğan Atalay as Kriminallhauptkommissar Ben Jäger. On 28 September 2012 Beck announced his exit from the series at the Bülent Ceylan Show. The last episode with Beck aired in December 2013.

On 11 March 2011 his first single Sexy was released, which went two weeks later directly in No. 50 in the singles charts. On 25 March 2011 Beck released his first album Superficial Animal, which debuted at number 36 of the German album charts. On 5 October 2012 he released his second studio album, Americanized.

Since his work for Cobra 11, Beck lives in Cologne.

In the summer of 2013, Tom Beck took part in the game show Schlag the Star and won. In October 2013 he participated in the TV total Stock Car Crash Challenge, finishing in 4th place. In February 2014, he also took part in the TV show TV total PokerStars.de Nacht.

In 2015, he played in the Sat.1 television movie Einstein, co-starring with Annika Ernst in the male lead role of police adviser Felix Winterberg. From January 2017 to March 2019, he has also taken over the role in the television series of the same name.

In 2016 he participated in the TV show Grill the Henssler. In the game show Schlag the Star he prevailed against Daniel Aminati and won 100,000 euros.

In 2020, he won the second season of the German version The Masked Singer as the Faultier ("Sloth").

== Entrepreneur ==
Beck is co-owner of the marketing and management company Check One Two Perfect GmbH, which, in addition to him, also manages YouTuber Bianca Heinicke (married name Claßen, "BibisBeautyPalace") and Julian Claßen ("Julienco"). Beck came under criticism in February 2015 as manager of the German YouTube - Star Bianca Heinicke. In one of her videos, Heinicke recommended a watch for around 250 EUR (~276,48 USD). However, she had concealed the fact that she made a profit via the Affiliate web link she offered under her video. Beck was accused by German TV Host Jan Böhmermann (Neo magazine Royale) of operating a business model with "mixture of the coolness of QVC combined with the seriousness and transparency of 9Live". The product placements would allow "13-year-olds to pay for his future pension". Beck lives in Berlin.

== Filmography ==
- 2004: Eine unter Tausend
- 2004: Ein krasser Deal
- 2004: Rosamunde Pilcher – Land der Sehnsucht
- 2004: Mädchen, Mädchen 2 – Loft oder Liebe
- 2004: Schulmädchen
- 2004: Der Ermittler – Objekt der Begierde
- 2005: Rotkäppchen
- 2005: Der letzte Zeuge
- 2005: Alles außer Sex
- 2005: Die Rosenheim-Cops
- 2005: Reblaus
- 2006: In aller Freundschaft – Starke Söhne
- 2006: Polizeiruf 110 – Tod im Ballhaus
- 2006: Unser Charly
- 2006: Die Frauen der Parkallee
- 2007: Spurlos
- 2007: Beim nächsten Tanz wird alles anders
- 2007: Rosamunde Pilcher – Pfeile der Liebe
- 2007: Inga Lindström – Hochzeit in Hardingsholm
- 2007: Forsthaus Falkenau
- 2008: SOKO 5113 – Schwelbrand
- 2008: Dörte’s Dancing
- 2008–2013, 2019: Alarm für Cobra 11 – Die Autobahnpolizei (88 episodes)
- 2009: Rabbit Without Ears 2
- 2009: Donna Leon – Wie durch ein dunkles Glas
- 2010: C.I.S. – Chaoten im Sondereinsatz
- 2011: Cologne P.D. – Durch fremde Fenster
- 2011: Geister all inclusive
- 2011: Ausgerechnet Sex!
- 2013: Break Up Man
- 2014: Joy of Fatherhood
- 2014: Therapy Crashers
- 2014: Everything Is Love
- 2014: Bella – Meine allerschlimmste Freundin
- 2014: Landliebe
- 2015: Einstein (pilot film)
- 2015: The Misplaced World
- 2016–2019: Einstein (TV series)
- 2017–2018: You Are Wanted
- 2024: Viktor Gantz - Indiana Jones and the Great Circle

== Discography ==
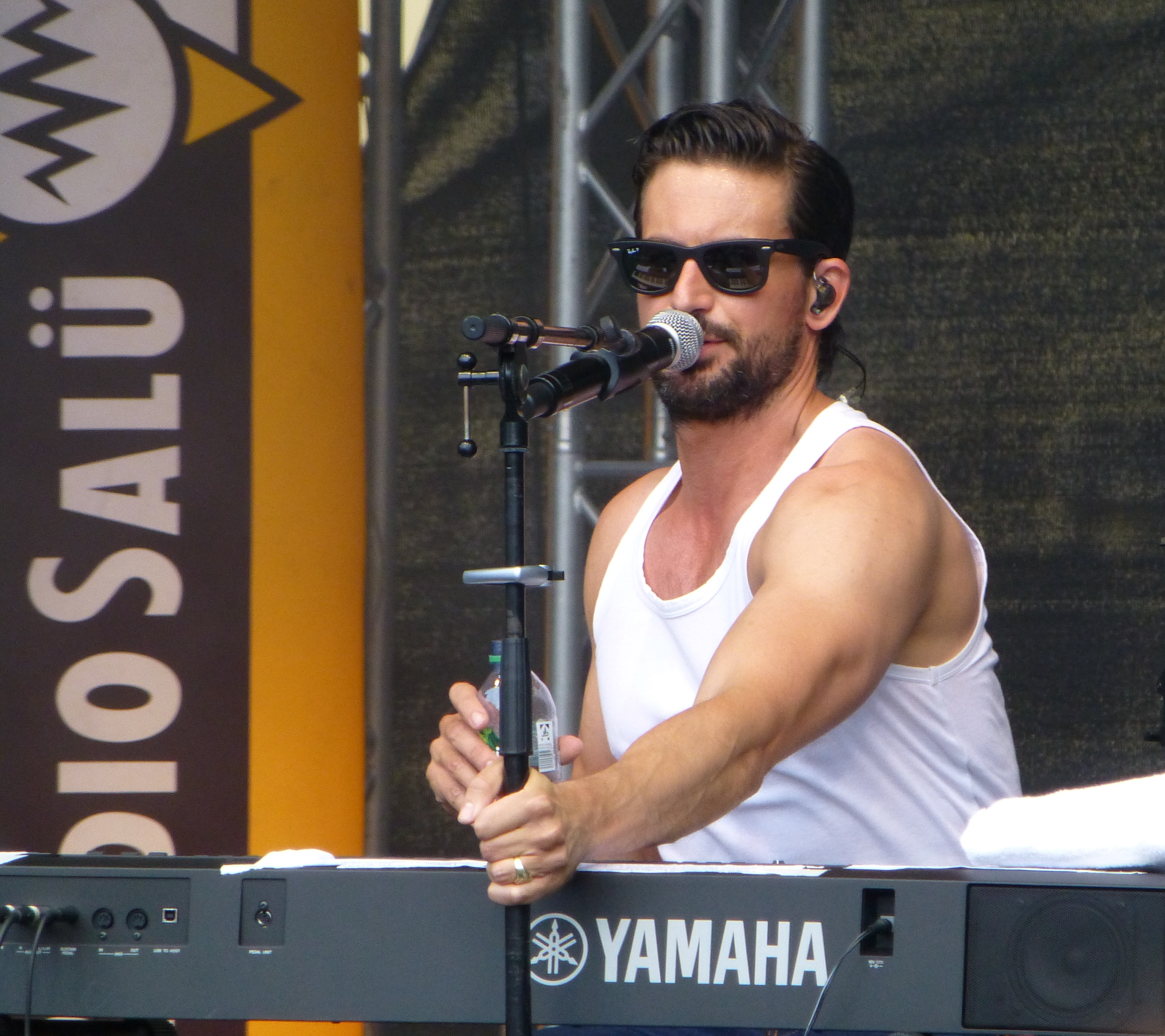
Tom Beck at Saarspektakel 2014 in Saarbrücken

Albums

- 2011: Superficial Animal (2011)
- 2012: Americanized (2012)
- 2013: Americanized Tour 2013 (2013)
- 2014: Unplugged in Köln (2014)
- 2015: So wie es ist (2015)

Singles

- 2011: Sexy (2011)
- 2011: Drive My Car (2011)
- 2011: The Longing (2011)
- 2012: Der Moment (2012)
- 2012: Ain't got you (2012)
- 2012: Nice Guys Finish Last (2012)
- 2013: This Time (2013)
- 2014: Fort von hier (2015)
- 2020: Pinguine (2020)

== Tours ==
- Americanized Tour (2013)
