= Nadja Becker =

German actress (born 1978)

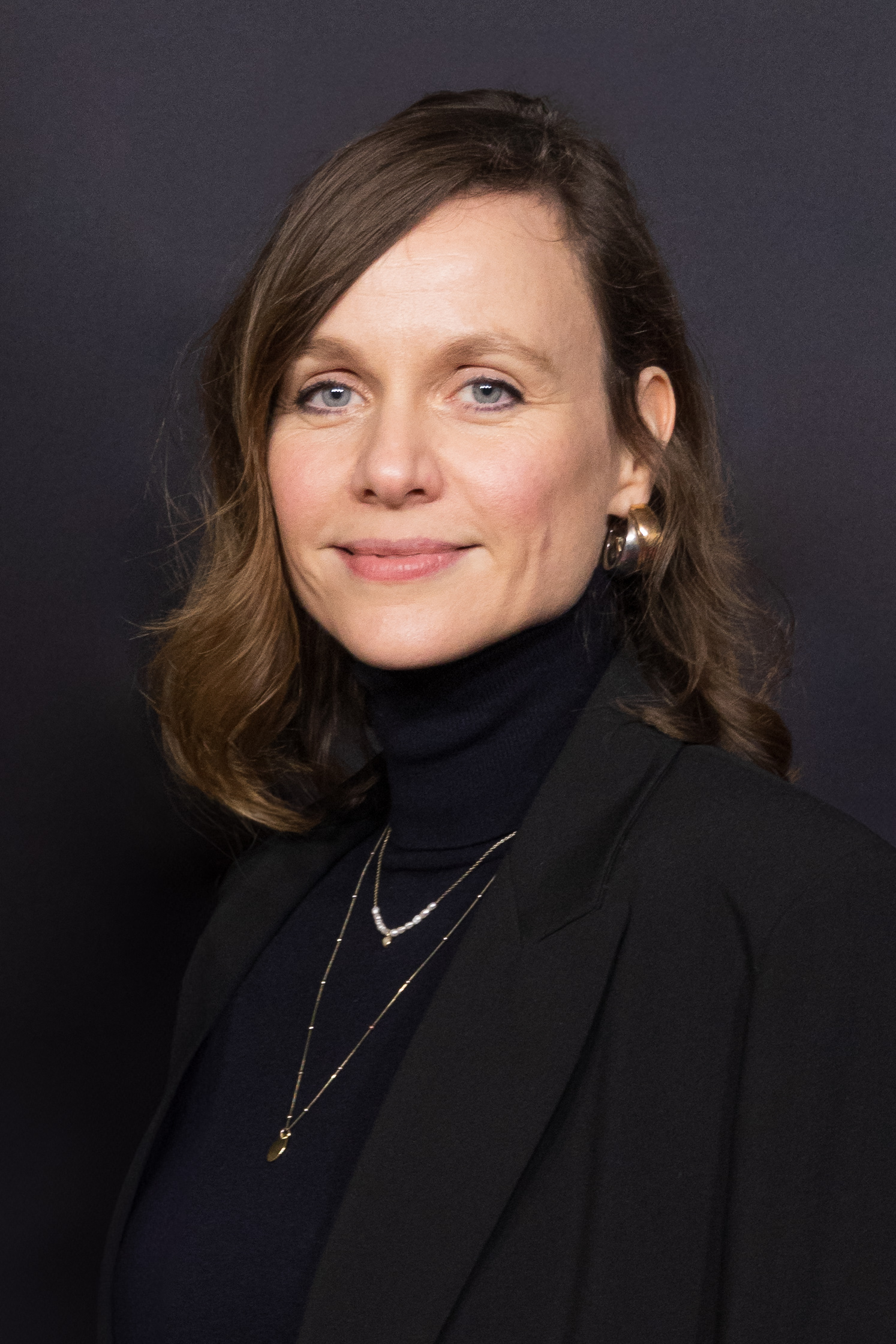
- Becker in 2024
- Born: 25 October 1978 (age 46); Siegen, West Germany
- Occupation: Actress
- Years active: 2001–present
- Website: nadja-becker.de

Nadja Becker (born 25 October 1978) is a German actress.

== Filmography ==
- 2003: Science Fiction, as Receptionist advertising agency
- 2004–2007: Stromberg, as Maja Decker
- 2007: Warum Männer nicht zuhören und Frauen schlecht einparken, as Angie Luschmund
- 2008: SOKO: Wismar, as Cindy Poguntke
- 2008: Polizeiruf 110, as Corinna
- 2008: Hallo Robbie!, as Dora Beier
- 2009: Tatort, as Rieka Cordes
- 2009: Ein Fall für zwei, as Julia Bartsch
- 2009: Ein starkes Team, as Evelyn Machnow
- 2010: The Whore, as Hiltrud
- 2010–2014: Danni Lowinski, as Bea Flohe
- 2013: Knocked Up, as Kerstin Lackner
- 2013: Robin Hood and I, as Marion Siebmann
- 2016: Adidas vs. Puma: The Brother's Feud, as Friedl Strasser-Dassler
- 2023: Manta, Manta: Legacy, as Sandra
