= Bert Tischendorf =

German actor

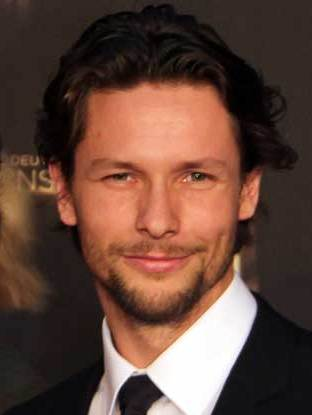
- Tischendorf in 2012
- Born: December 21, 1979 (age 46); Schwerin, East Germany

Bert Tischendorf (born 21 December 1979 in Schwerin) is a German actor.

== Life ==
Tischendorf was born as the son of a teacher couple in Schwerin. Tischendorf spent his school years on the Schwerin sports high school and was in his approximately 10-year career as a performance swimmer several times champion of Mecklenburg-Vorpommern. In 1998 he passed the abitur. After studying medicine at the University of Jena for one and a half years, from 2001 to October 2004 he attended the Ernst Busch Academy of Dramatic Arts in Berlin. Already during his studies Tischendorf became known to a wider audience in the ProSieben television series 18 – Allein unter Mädchen, in which he played one of the four leading roles. After graduating, he briefly played at the Staatstheater Cottbus before he was a permanent member of the Schauspiel Frankfurt from 2005 to 2009. Then he starred the male lead role in the television films The Whore including sequels and Isenhart: The Hunt Is on for Your Soul. He was seen as Olympian Manfred Ommer in the ARD documentary drama Vom Traum zum Terror: Olympia München 1972. In 2013 Tischendorf embodies one of the male lead roles in the RTL television series Doc meets Dorf.

Currently he acts in the ZDF television series Letzte Spur Berlin and RTL television series Beck is back!.

He lives in Berlin.
