= Gregor Seberg =

Austrian actor

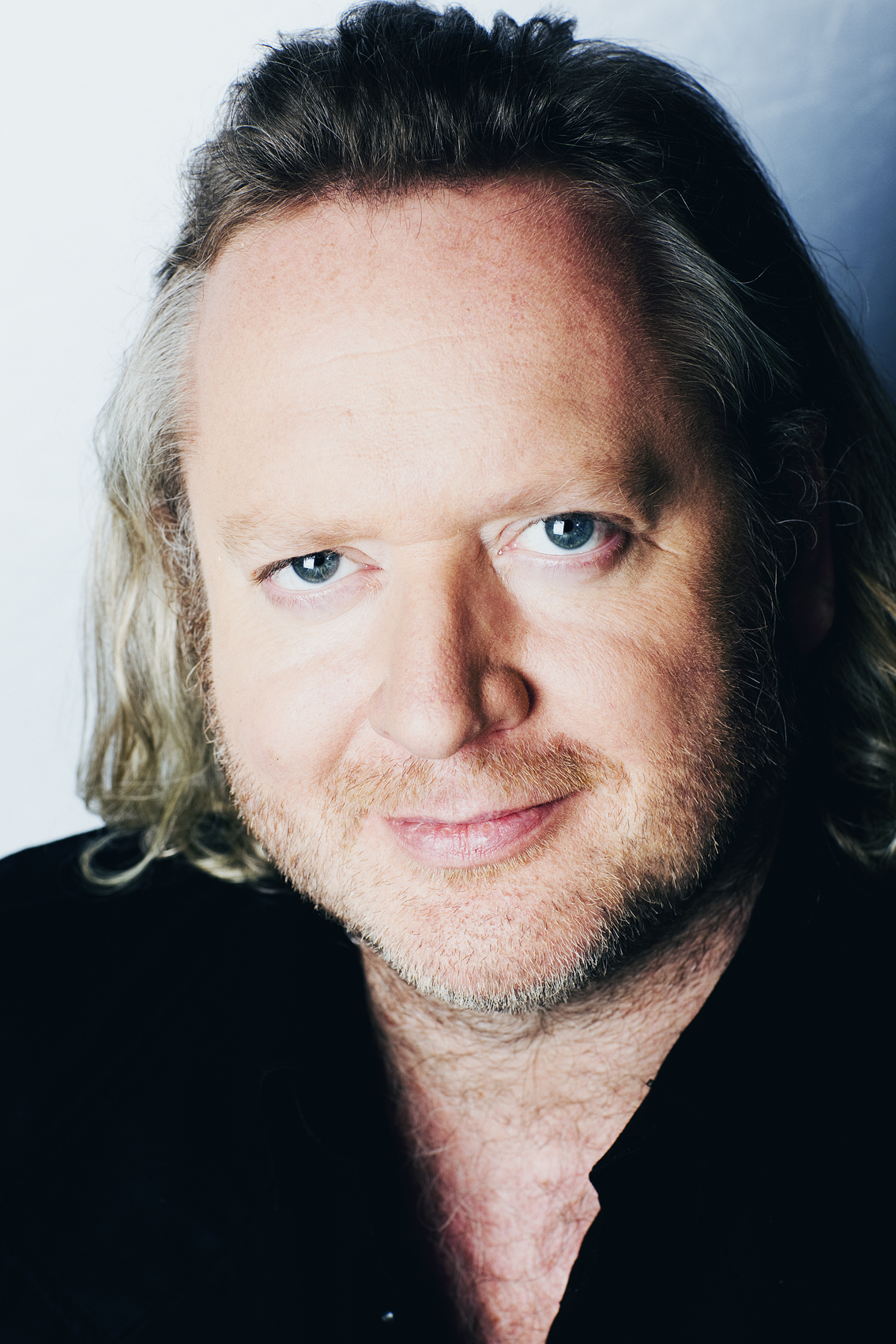
Gregor Seberg

Gregor Seberg (born 24 July 1967 in Graz) is an Austrian actor.

== Life ==
He moved to Vienna aged 13 and studied German studies and theatre studies for a few semesters before moving to the Vienna Conservatoire to study acting. He then worked as a freelance actor, director and writer. For two years he was co-host of Talk Radio on Ö3. Seberg is a co-founder of the theatre group 'Ateatta' and played Alex in a theatre version of A Clockwork Orange. Other acting theatre roles include the one man show Sex, Drugs, Rock&Roll as well as Richard III, Onkel Wanja, Der Widerspenstigen Zähmung (Petruchio), Die 3 von der Tankstelle (Kurt), Entführung aus dem Serail (Bassa Selim), Weh’ dem, der lügt (Leon) and Cyrano de Bergerac (Cyrano). Between 2005 and 2017 Helmuth Nowak in SOKO Donau.
