= List of German actors =

This is a list of notable German actors from 1895, the year of the first public showing of a motion picture by the Lumière brothers, to the present. Actors are listed in the period in which their film careers began and the careers of most spanned more than just one period. The list currently includes actors that appear in German movies, including those of foreign origin. For the periods corresponding to the era when Germany was divided the list is split into two categories: BRD for West German actors and DEFA for East German actors.

== Pre-film ==
- Friederike Bethmann-Unzelmann

== Early silent era (1895–1918) ==
Men

- Alfred Abel
- Fritz Achterberg
- Max Adalbert
- Hans Albers
- Georg Alexander
- Carl Auen
- Felix Basch
- Albert Bassermann
- Rudolf Biebrach
- Paul Bildt
- Curt Bois
- Louis Brody
- Richard Eichberg
- Julius Falkenstein
- Olaf Fönss
- Henrik Galeen
- Curt Goetz
- John Gottowt
- Emmerich Hanus
- Heinz Hanus
- Ludwig Hartau
- Paul Hartmann
- Emil Jannings
- Victor Janson
- Hans Junkermann
- Fritz Kampers
- Bruno Kastner
- Friedrich Kayssler
- Fritz Kortner
- Werner Krauss
- Friedrich Kühne
- Rudolf Lettinger
- Harry Liedtke
- Theodor Loos
- Hans Mierendorff
- Alexander Moissi
- Paul Otto
- Max Pallenberg
- Lupu Pick
- Harry Piel
- Franz Porten
- Heinrich Schroth
- Fritz Schulz
- Reinhold Schünzel
- Viktor Schwanneke
- Walter Steinbeck
- Hermann Thimig
- Jakob Tiedtke
- Karl Valentin
- Hermann Vallentin
- Conrad Veidt
- Gustav Waldau
- Paul Wegener
- Eduard von Winterstein
- Friedrich Zelnik
- Wolfgang Zilzer

Women

- Fern Andra
- Hanne Brinkmann
- Maria Carmi
- Lil Dagover
- Blandine Ebinger
- Maria Forescu
- Käthe Haack
- Cläre Lotto
- Eva May
- Mia May
- Lya Mara
- Anna Müller-Lincke
- Pola Negri
- Asta Nielsen
- Aud Egede Nissen
- Ossi Oswalda
- Henny Porten
- Lyda Salmonova
- Adele Sandrock
- Magda Sonja
- Rosa Valetti
- Elsa Wagner
- Dorrit Weixler
- Maria Zelenka

== Late silent era (1919–1930) ==
Men

- Hans Albers
- Siegfried Arno
- Hans Behrendt
- Wilhelm Bendow
- Charly Berger
- Paul Biensfeldt
- Hans Brausewetter
- Eugen Burg
- Ernst Deutsch
- Carl de Vogt
- Gustav Diessl
- Wilhelm Dieterle
- Max Ehrlich
- Karl Etlinger
- Ferdinand Exl
- Hugo Fischer-Köppe
- Albert Florath
- Willi Forst
- Rudolf Forster
- Willy Fritsch
- Gustav Fröhlich
- Otto Gebühr
- Heinrich George
- Kurt Gerron
- Bernhard Goetzke
- Alexander Granach
- Veit Harlan
- Wolfgang Heinz
- Paul Henckels
- Oskar Homolka
- Paul Hörbiger
- Oskar Karlweis
- Rudolf Klein-Rogge
- Eugen Klöpfer
- František Lederer
- Fred Louis Lerch
- Kurt Lilien
- Hubert von Meyerinck
- Paul Morgan
- Albert Paulig
- Fritz Rasp
- Paul Richter
- Johannes Riemann
- Walter Rilla
- Ralph Arthur Roberts
- Max Schreck
- Oskar Sima
- Ernst Stahl-Nachbaur
- Albert Steinrück
- Igo Sym
- Szöke Szakall
- Jack Trevor
- Conrad Veidt
- Kurt Vespermann
- Otto Wallburg
- Gustav von Wangenheim
- Otto Wernicke
- Mathias Wieman

Women

- Truus van Aalten
- Marcella Albani
- Betty Amann
- Charlotte Ander
- Lissy Arna
- Vilma Bánky
- Anita Berber
- Elisabeth Bergner
- Betty Bird
- Renate Brausewetter
- Elga Brink
- Louise Brooks
- Olga Chekhova
- Mady Christians
- María Corda
- Maly Delschaft
- Xenia Desni
- Marlene Dietrich
- Anita Dorris
- Käthe Dorsch
- Lia Eibenschütz
- Wera Engels
- Lucie Englisch
- Anna Exl
- Greta Garbo
- Dora Gerson
- Valeska Gert
- Therese Giehse
- Erika Glässner
- Nora Gregor
- Ilka Grüning
- Liane Haid
- Lilian Harvey
- Brigitte Helm
- Trude Hesterberg
- Lucie Höflich
- Camilla Horn
- Jenny Jugo
- La Jana
- Liesl Karlstadt
- Inge Landgut
- Gilda Langer
- Helena Makowska
- Fee Malten
- Lucie Mannheim
- Maria Matray
- Gerda Maurus
- Erna Morena
- Grete Mosheim
- Renate Müller
- Käthe von Nagy
- Anny Ondra
- Dita Parlo
- Lya de Putti
- Hanna Ralph
- Leni Riefenstahl
- Margarete Schön
- Dagny Servaes
- Hilde von Stolz
- Agnes Straub
- Charlotte Susa
- Hilde Wagener
- Hedwig Wangel
- Hertha von Walther
- Ruth Weyher
- Anna May Wong
- Ida Wüst

== Early sound era (1928–1935) ==
Men

- Hans Albers
- Wolf Ackva
- Wolf Albach-Retty
- Günther Ballier
- Paul Beckers
- Walter Bechmann
- Gerhard Bienert
- Willy Birgel
- Horst Birr
- Beppo Brem
- Volker von Collande
- Karl Dannemann
- Viktor de Kowa
- René Deltgen
- Hans Deppe
- Karl Ludwig Diehl
- Will Dohm
- Erich Dunskus
- Josef Egger
- Josef Eichheim
- Erich Fiedler
- Werner Finck
- Fritz Genschow
- Heinrich George
- Friedrich Gnaß
- Gustaf Gründgens
- Ferdinand Hart
- Paul Hartmann
- O. E. Hasse
- Emil Hegetschweiler
- Karl Hellmer
- Hans Henninger
- Oskar Höcker
- Attila Hörbiger
- Fritz Imhoff
- Paul Kemp
- Erich Kestin
- Jan Kiepura
- Paul Klinger
- Ernst Legal
- Hans Leibelt
- Wolfgang Liebeneiner
- Albert Lieven
- Theo Lingen
- Eduard Linkers
- Günther Lüders
- Kurt Meisel
- Karl Meixner
- Bernhard Minetti
- Hans Moser
- Franz Nicklisch
- Erik Ode
- Fritz Odemar
- Harald Paulsen
- Rudolf Platte
- Erich Ponto
- Hans Richter
- Richard Romanowsky
- Heinz Rühmann
- Otto Sauter-Sarto
- Franz Schafheitlin
- Werner Scharf
- Joseph Schmidt
- Albrecht Schoenhals
- Hugo Schrader
- Rudolf Schündler
- Willi Schur
- Siegfried Schürenberg
- Josef Sieber
- Leo Slezak
- Hans Söhnker
- Gustl Gstettenbaur
- Wolfgang Staudte
- Werner Stock
- Joe Stöckel
- Hans Stüwe
- Luis Trenker
- Ernst Udet
- Aribert Wäscher
- Franz Weber
- Weiß Ferdl
- Herbert Weissbach
- Heinz Wemper
- Ewald Wenck
- Carl Wery
- Adolf Wohlbrück

Women

- Gitta Alpár
- Maria Andergast
- Elise Aulinger
- Lida Baarova
- Fita Benkhoff
- Ery Bos
- Lina Carstens
- Marieluise Claudius
- Charlott Daudert
- Lien Deyers
- Marta Eggerth
- Maria Eis
- Else Elster
- Erna Fentsch
- Heli Finkenzeller
- Ellen Frank
- Ilse Fürstenberg
- Käthe Gold
- Ursula Grabley
- Hertha Guthmar
- Dolly Haas
- Karin Hardt
- Ruth Hellberg
- Hilde Hildebrand
- Carola Höhn
- Lizzi Holzschuh
- Marianne Hoppe
- Brigitte Horney
- Hedy Kiesler
- Maria Koppenhöfer
- Hansi Knoteck
- Dorit Kreysler
- Susi Lanner
- Carsta Löck
- Trude Marlen
- Lucy Millowitsch
- Erna Morena
- Renate Müller
- Anna Müller-Lincke
- Genia Nikolajewa
- Edith Oss
- Sabine Peters
- Rotraut Richter
- Annie Rosar
- Angela Salloker
- Sybille Schmitz
- Hilde Schneider
- Magda Schneider
- Edith Schultze-Westrum
- Hilde Sessak
- Emmy Sonnemann
- Camilla Spira
- Lotte Spira
- Margit Symo
- Gretl Theimer
- Hertha Thiele
- Luise Ullrich
- Lizzi Waldmüller
- Grethe Weiser
- Hilde Weissner
- Dorothea Wieck

== Third Reich (1933–1945) ==
Men

- Hans Albers
- Axel von Ambesser
- Franz Arzdorf
- Ewald Balser
- Reinhold Bernt
- Erwin Biegel
- Willy Birgel
- Franz Böheim
- Dieter Borsche
- Joachim Brennecke
- Siegfried Breuer
- Hermann Brix
- Rudolf Carl
- Horst Caspar
- Paul Dahlke
- Theodor Danegger
- Friedrich Domin
- Robert Dorsay
- Heinz Engelmann
- Rudolf Fernau
- Lothar Firmans
- O. W. Fischer
- Hans Fitz
- Erik Frey
- Ernst Fritz Fürbringer
- Werner Fuetterer
- Heinrich George
- Beniamino Gigli
- Rudi Godden
- Alexander Golling
- Joachim Gottschalk
- Clemens Hasse
- Max Haufler
- Ullrich Haupt
- Johannes Heesters
- Werner Hinz
- Hans Holt
- Paul Hubschmid
- Karl John
- Curd Jürgens
- Wolf Kaiser
- Ernst von Klipstein
- Gustav Knuth
- Eduard Köck
- Ernst Legal
- Wolfgang Lukschy
- Ferdinand Marian
- Karl Martell
- Albert Matterstock
- Gunnar Möller
- Walter Müller
- Alfred Neugebauer
- Hans Nielsen
- Hans Olden
- Rudolf Prack
- Will Quadflieg
- Hans Quest
- Carl Raddatz
- Walter Richter
- Sepp Rist
- Heinz Rühmann
- Werner Scharf
- Raimund Schelcher
- Ludwig Schmid-Wildy
- Ludwig Schmitz
- Karl Schönböck
- Ernst Schröder
- Carl-Heinz Schroth
- Viktor Staal
- Hannes Stelzer
- Georg Thomalla
- Otto Treßler
- Paul Verhoeven
- Rudolf Vogel
- Fritz Wagner
- Kurt Waitzmann
- Ernst Waldow
- Heinz Welzel
- Wastl Witt

Women

- Rosa Albach-Retty
- Viktoria von Ballasko
- Maria Bard
- Ingrid Bergman
- Hedwig Bleibtreu
- Monika Burg
- Gisela von Collande
- Elfriede Datzig
- Marina von Ditmar
- Berta Drews
- Hertha Feiler
- Elisabeth Flickenschildt
- Margarete Haagen
- Trude Haefelin
- Marte Harell
- Heidemarie Hatheyer
- Angelika Hauff
- Kirsten Heiberg
- Ruth Hellberg
- Ursula Herking
- Margot Hielscher
- Karin Himboldt
- Maria Holst
- Gusti Huber
- Hildegard Knef
- Lotte Koch
- Hilde Körber
- Hilde Krahl
- Evelyn Künneke
- Lotte Lang
- Zarah Leander
- Maria Litto
- Bruni Löbel
- Ruth Lommel
- Christl Mardayn
- Leny Marenbach
- Winnie Markus
- Valerie von Martens
- Gerda Maurus
- Elfie Mayerhofer
- Irene von Meyendorff
- Lola Müthel
- Susi Nicoletti
- Ilse Petri
- Mady Rahl
- Marika Rökk
- Tatjana Sais
- Françoise Rosay
- Gretl Schörg
- Hannelore Schroth
- Hilde Seipp
- Erna Sellmer
- Kristina Söderbaum
- Maria von Tasnady
- Erika von Thellmann
- Jane Tilden
- Alice Treff
- Gisela Uhlen
- Anneliese Uhlig
- Ilse Werner
- Paula Wessely
- Agnes Windeck
- Gusti Wolf
- Sonja Ziemann

== Post-war years and the 1950s ==
=== BRD ===
Men

- Hans Albers
- Mario Adorf
- Thomas Alder
- Michael Ande
- Eddi Arent
- Arno Assmann
- Balduin Baas
- Ulrich Beiger
- Martin Benrath
- Claus Biederstaedt
- Hans Christian Blech
- Karlheinz Böhm
- Hans von Borsody
- Pinkas Braun
- Horst Buchholz
- Bully Buhlan
- Walter Buschhoff
- Hans Caninenberg
- Peter Carsten
- Hans Clarin
- Wolfgang Condrus
- Heinz Conrads
- Ivan Desny
- Anton Diffring
- Christian Doermer
- Heinz Drache
- Eckart Dux
- Fritz Eckhardt
- Heinz Erhardt
- Dieter Eppler
- Paul Esser
- Hansjörg Felmy
- Bert Fortell
- Horst Frank
- Peter Frankenfeld
- Robert Freytag
- Gert Fröbe
- Joachim Fuchsberger
- Götz George
- Rex Gildo
- Walter Giller
- Reinhard Glemnitz
- Heini Göbel
- Boy Gobert
- Jürgen Goslar
- Robert Graf
- Heinrich Gretler
- Kurt Großkurth
- Klaus Havenstein
- Martin Held
- Jan Hendriks
- Michael Hinz
- Gert Günther Hoffmann
- Claus Holm
- Thomas Hörbiger
- Adrian Hoven
- Chris Howland
- Wolfgang Jansen
- Horst Janson
- Günther Jerschke
- Harald Juhnke
- Roland Kaiser
- Helmut Käutner
- Alexander Kerst
- Klaus Kinski
- Walter Kohut
- Reinhard Kolldehoff
- Peter Kraus
- Hardy Krüger
- Volker Lechtenbrink
- Stanislav Ledinek
- Rudolf Lenz
- Karl Lieffen
- Helmuth Lohner
- Hanns Lothar
- Paul Löwinger
- Klaus Löwitsch
- Siegfried Lowitz
- Alf Marholm
- Josef Meinrad
- Günter Meisner
- Hannes Messemer
- Harry Meyen
- Willy Millowitsch
- Lutz Moik
- Peter Mosbacher
- Fritz Muliar
- Reggie Nalder
- Wolfgang Neuss
- Rolf Olsen
- Peter Pasetti
- Werner Peters
- Günter Pfitzmann
- Gunther Philipp
- Wolfgang Preiss
- Helmut Qualtinger
- Freddy Quinn
- Siegfried Rauch
- Charles Regnier
- Heinz Reincke
- Raoul Retzer
- Walther Reyer
- Rudolf Rhomberg
- Gerhard Riedmann
- Paul Edwin Roth
- Maximilian Schell
- Erich Schellow
- Helmut Schmid
- Peer Schmidt
- Heinz Schimmelpfennig
- Rolf Schimpf
- Rudolf Schock
- Hermann Schomberg
- Dietmar Schönherr
- Günther Schramm
- Carl-Heinz Schroth
- Heinz Schubert
- Werner Schumacher
- Erik Schumann
- Heinrich Schweiger
- Walter Sedlmayr
- Willy Semmelrogge
- Sigfrit Steiner
- Günther Stoll
- Erwin Strahl
- Horst Tappert
- Carlos Thompson
- Herbert Tiede
- Fritz Tillmann
- Vico Torriani
- Peter van Eyck
- Michael Verhoeven
- Gerd Vespermann
- Peter Vogel
- Wolfgang Völz
- Peter Weck
- Heinz Weiss
- Oskar Werner
- Bernhard Wicki
- Claus Wilcke
- Christian Wolff
- Ralf Wolter
- Klausjürgen Wussow
- Harry Wüstenhagen
- Helmut Zacharias

Women

- Elke Aberle
- Dawn Addams
- Anouk Aimée
- Ingrid Andree
- Karin Baal
- Vivi Bach
- Eva Bartok
- Erica Beer
- Sabine Bethmann
- Anne-Marie Blanc
- Grit Boettcher
- Hannelore Bollmann
- Cornell Borchers
- Heidi Brühl
- Susanne Cramer
- Germaine Damar
- Karin Dor
- Ruth Drexel
- Annemarie Düringer
- Inge Egger
- Maria Emo
- Renate Ewert
- Claude Farell
- Helga Feddersen
- Violetta Ferrari
- Kai Fischer
- Veronika Fitz
- Helga Franck
- Lore Frisch
- Cornelia Froboess
- Wera Frydtberg
- Gardy Granass
- Brigitte Grothum
- Waltraut Haas
- Carla Hagen
- Edith Hancke
- Nicole Heesters
- Trude Herr
- Loni Heuser
- Marianne Hold
- Christiane Hörbiger
- Ulla Jacobsson
- Gertraud Jesserer
- Bibi Johns
- Heidi Kabel
- Elma Karlowa
- Christine Kaufmann
- Eva Kerbler
- Alice Kessler
- Ellen Kessler
- Doris Kirchner
- Marianne Koch
- Johanna von Koczian
- Eva Kotthaus
- Elfriede Kuzmany
- Tilly Lauenstein
- Lotte Ledl
- Ruth Leuwerik
- Ursula Lillig
- Ursula Lingen
- Gerlinde Locker
- Erni Mangold
- Marie-Luise Marjan
- Johanna Matz
- Christiane Maybach
- Katharina Mayberg
- Inge Meysel
- Marion Michael
- Brigitte Mira
- Vera Molnar
- Elisabeth Müller
- Christiane Nielsen
- Margit Nünke
- Ilse Pagé
- Lilli Palmer
- Rita Paul
- Maria Perschy
- Ina Peters
- Eva Pflug
- Eva Probst
- Liselotte Pulver
- Laya Raki
- Nadja Regin
- Erika Remberg
- Barbara Rütting
- Maria Schell
- Romy Schneider
- Ingeborg Schöner
- Edith Schultze-Westrum
- Maria Sebaldt
- Alma Seidler
- Sabina Sesselmann
- Sabine Sinjen
- Ann Smyrner
- Elke Sommer
- Herta Staal
- Ruth Stephan
- Ilse Steppat
- Helene Thimig
- Nadja Tiller
- Margot Trooger
- Gisela Trowe
- Vera Tschechowa
- Caterina Valente
- Ingrid van Bergen
- Lis Verhoeven
- Helen Vita
- Antje Weisgerber
- Sybil Werden
- Elisabeth Wiedemann
- Hanne Wieder
- Christa Williams
- Marianne Wischmann

=== DEFA ===
Men

- Gerhard Bienert
- Fred Delmare
- Fritz Diez
- Fred Düren
- Hans Finohr
- Erwin Geschonneck
- Hannjo Hasse
- Ezard Haußmann
- Wolfgang Heinz
- Martin Hellberg
- Albert Hetterle
- Wolf Kaiser
- Willy A. Kleinau
- Wolfgang Kieling
- Hans Klering
- Heinz Klevenow
- Herbert Köfer
- Manfred Krug
- Horst Kube
- Rolf Ludwig
- Armin Mueller-Stahl
- Leon Niemczyk
- Werner Peters
- Herbert Richter
- Günther Simon
- Ekkehard Schall
- Raimund Schelcher
- Helmut Schreiber
- Heinz Schubert
- Horst Schulze
- Günther Simon
- Hilmar Thate
- Ulrich Thein
- Rudolf Ulrich
- Gerry Wolff

Women

- Christel Bodenstein
- Carola Braunbock
- Angela Brunner
- Annekathrin Bürger
- Barbara Dittus
- Helga Göring
- Eva-Maria Hagen
- Angelika Hurwicz
- Inge Keller
- Brigitte Krause
- Ruth Maria Kubitschek
- Steffie Spira
- Sonja Sutter
- Sabine Thalbach

== The 1960s ==
=== BRD ===
Men

- Werner Abrolat
- Lukas Ammann
- Gerd Baltus
- Lex Barker
- Rainer Basedow
- Hans-Jürgen Bäumler
- Hartmut Becker
- Rolf Becker
- Helmut Berger
- Peter Berling
- Uwe Beyer
- Roy Black
- Gerd Böckmann
- Hark Bohm
- Marquard Bohm
- Horst Bollmann
- Herbert Bötticher
- Arthur Brauss
- Pierre Brice
- Karl Dall
- Michael Degen
- Gernot Endemann
- Werner Enke
- Rainer Werner Fassbinder
- Uwe Friedrichsen
- Thomas Fritsch
- Herbert Fux
- Vadim Glowna
- Stewart Granger
- Helmut Griem
- Ludwig Haas
- Hans Häckermann
- Hans Peter Hallwachs
- Karl-Heinz von Hassel
- Gert Haucke
- Bernd Herzsprung
- Robert Hoffmann
- Klaus Höhne
- Udo Jürgens
- Udo Kier
- Wolfgang Kieling
- Ulli Kinalzik
- Wilfried Klaus
- Hans Peter Korff
- Hans Korte
- Volkert Kraeft
- Hellmut Lange
- Friedrich von Ledebur
- Harald Leipnitz
- Ulli Lommel
- Walo Lüönd
- Henry van Lyck
- Lutz Mackensy
- Ferdy Mayne
- George Nader
- Werner Pochath
- Kurt Raab
- Ilja Richter
- Horst Sachtleben
- Klaus Schwarzkopf
- Heintje Simons
- Günter Strack
- Fritz Wepper
- Rolf Zacher

Women

- Helga Anders
- Hannelore Auer
- Vivi Bach
- Ina Bauer
- Iris Berben
- Senta Berger
- Jana Brejchová
- Ingrid Caven
- Hannelore Elsner
- Uschi Glas
- Mascha Gonska
- Gitte Haenning
- Gisela Hahn
- Irm Hermann
- Hannelore Hoger
- Karin Hübner
- Hansi Jochmann
- Anna Karina
- Heide Keller
- Diana Körner
- Sylva Koscina
- Christiane Krüger
- Ruth Maria Kubitschek
- Doris Kunstmann
- Daliah Lavi
- Monika Lundi
- Margot Mahler
- Michaela May
- Marisa Mell
- Anita Pallenberg
- Erika Pluhar
- Witta Pohl
- Andrea Rau
- Eva Renzi
- Letitia Roman
- Catherine Schell
- Christiane Schmidtmer
- Barbara Schöne
- Christine Schuberth
- Hanna Schygulla
- Elke Sommer
- Jutta Speidel
- Alexandra Stewart
- Ewa Strömberg
- Margarethe von Trotta
- Susanne Uhlen
- Barbara Valentin
- Marie Versini
- Elisabeth Volkmann
- Heidelinde Weis
- Gila von Weitershausen
- Annemarie Wendl
- Thekla Carola Wied
- Angela Winkler
- Judy Winter
- Christine Wodetzky

=== DEFA ===
Men

- Peter Borgelt
- Eberhard Esche
- Thomas Fritsch
- Jürgen Frohriep
- Winfried Glatzeder
- Michael Gwisdek
- Jürgen Hentsch
- Rolf Herricht
- Rolf Hoppe
- Manfred Karge
- Horst Krause
- Dieter Mann
- Gojko Mitić
- Armin Müller-Stahl
- Rolf Römer
- Frank Schöbel
- Reiner Schöne
- Gunter Schoß
- Jaecki Schwarz
- Alfred Struwe
- Wolfgang Winkler
- Manfred Zetzsche

Women

- Carmen-Maja Antoni
- Renate Blume
- Barbara Brylska
- Annekathrin Bürger
- Angelica Domröse
- Cox Habbema
- Jutta Hoffmann
- Blanche Kommerell
- Vera Oelschlegel
- Gudrun Ritter
- Walfriede Schmitt
- Jutta Wachowiak
- Ursula Werner
- Monika Woytowicz

== The 1970s ==
=== BRD ===
Men

- Herbert Achternbusch
- Christian Anders
- Werner Asam
- Peer Augustinski
- Harry Baer
- Gustl Bayrhammer
- Ekkehardt Belle
- David Bennent
- Heinz Bennent
- Helmut Berger
- Christian Berkel
- Josef Bierbichler
- Uwe Bohm
- Klaus Maria Brandauer
- Jacques Breuer
- Jochen Busse
- Rudi Carrell
- Burkhard Driest
- Sky du Mont
- Christoph Eichhorn
- Helmut Fischer
- Herbert Fleischmann
- Dirk Galuba
- Claus Theo Gärtner
- Wolfgang Grönebaum
- Herbert Grönemeyer
- Matthias Habich
- Dieter Hallervorden
- Günther Maria Halmer
- Raimund Harmstorf
- Reinhard Hauff
- Dieter Thomas Heck
- Sascha Hehn
- André Heller
- Heinz Hoenig
- Dominique Horwitz
- Jörg Hube
- Rainer Hunold
- Gottfried John
- Günther Kaufmann
- Peter Kern
- Christian Kohlund
- Hansi Kraus
- Diether Krebs
- Günter Lamprecht
- Dieter Laser
- Hermann Lause
- Heiner Lauterbach
- Manfred Lehmann
- Peter Maffay
- Krystian Martinek
- Dietrich Mattausch
- Peter Millowitsch
- Josef Moosholzer
- Marius Müller-Westernhagen
- Thomas Ohrner
- Hanno Pöschl
- Jürgen Prochnow
- Tilo Prückner
- Christian Quadflieg
- Alexander Radszun
- Chris Roberts
- Wolf Roth
- Udo Samel
- Otto Sander
- Michael Schanze
- Dieter Schidor
- Walter Schmidinger
- Martin Semmelrogge
- Bernd Tauber
- Rüdiger Vogler
- Karl-Heinz Vosgerau
- Konstantin Wecker
- Elmar Wepper
- Rudolf Wessely
- Hanns Zischler

Women

- Adelheid Arndt
- Monica Bleibtreu
- Tabea Blumenschein
- Ursula Buchfellner
- Mareike Carrière
- Margit Carstensen
- Ingrid Caven
- Ute Christensen
- Edith Clever
- Sybil Danning
- Gaby Dohm
- Tina Engel
- Constanze Engelbrecht
- Maria Furtwängler
- Evelyn Hamann
- Anja Jaenicke
- Nastassja Kinski
- Hildegard Krekel
- Lisa Kreuzer
- Barbara Lass
- Anita Lochner
- Eva Mattes
- Sabine von Maydell
- Sunnyi Melles
- Evelyn Opela
- Olivia Pascal
- Patricia Rhomberg
- Karin Schubert
- Ingrid Steeger
- Barbara Sukowa
- Elisabeth Trissenaar
- Dietlinde Turban
- Rosel Zech

=== DEFA ===
Men

- Vlastimil Brodský
- Thomas Gumpert
- Henry Hübchen
- Uwe Kockisch
- Jiří Menzel
- Amza Pellea
- Franciszek Pieczka
- Dean Reed
- Peter Sodann

Women

- Violeta Andrei
- Petra Hinze
- Ursula Karusseit
- Renate Krößner
- Katrin Sass
- Johanna Schall
- Christine Schorn
- Katharina Thalbach
- Franziska Troegner
- Beata Tyszkiewicz

== The 1980s ==
=== BRD ===
Men

- Mario Adorf
- Robert Atzorn
- Dirk Bach
- Dietmar Bär
- Markus Böttcher
- Michael Brandner
- Gedeon Burkhard
- Ottfried Fischer
- Albert Fortell
- Thomas Gottschalk
- Dominik Graf
- Alexander Held
- Jochen Horst
- Charles M. Huber
- Hannes Jaenicke
- Burghart Klaußner
- Herbert Knaup
- Horst Krause
- Walter Kreye
- Franz Xaver Kroetz
- Mike Krüger
- Horst Kummeth
- Leonard Lansink
- Heiner Lauterbach
- Robert Meyer
- Axel Milberg
- Richy Müller
- Miroslav Nemec
- Uwe Ochsenknecht
- Daniel Olbrychski
- Christoph M. Ohrt
- Dieter Pfaff
- Gerhard Polt
- Dominic Raacke
- Christian Redl
- Robinson Reichel
- Ralf Richter
- Udo Samel
- Peter Sattmann
- Walter Sittler
- Werner Stocker
- Jürgen Tonkel
- Christian Tramitz
- Ulrich Tukur
- Georg Uecker
- Otto Waalkes
- Klaus Wennemann
- Manfred Zapatka
- August Zirner

Women

- Adriana Altaras
- Barbara Auer
- Monika Baumgartner
- Julia Biedermann
- Katharina Böhm
- Suzanne von Borsody
- Marita Breuer
- Renan Demirkan
- Anica Dobra
- Gundi Ellert
- Beate Finckh
- Katja Flint
- Marie Gruber
- Isa Jank
- Ursula Karven
- Ulrike Krumbiegel
- Anja Kruse
- Gudrun Landgrebe
- Ulrike Mai
- Dagmar Manzel
- Maja Maranow
- Valerie Niehaus
- Jennifer Nitsch
- Désirée Nosbusch
- Christina Plate
- Sibylle Rauch
- Katja Riemann
- Barbara Rudnik
- Marianne Sägebrecht
- Birge Schade
- Maria Schrader
- Anja Schüte
- Lena Stolze
- Barbara Sukowa
- Anna Thalbach
- Karin Thaler
- Dana Vávrová
- Daniela Ziegler

=== DEFA ===
Men

- Matthias Freihof
- Sylvester Groth
- Robert Gwisdek
- André Hennicke
- Dirk Kummer
- Bernd Michael Lade
- Jan Josef Liefers
- Sven Martinek
- Manfred Möck
- Ulrich Mühe
- Pierre Sanoussi-Bliss
- Jörg Schüttauf

Women

- Corinna Harfouch
- Julia Jäger
- Dagmar Manzel
- Simone Thomalla

== The 1990s ==
Men

- Erdoğan Atalay
- Wolfgang Bahro
- Henning Baum
- Rufus Beck
- Ben Becker
- Klaus J. Behrendt
- Alexander Beyer
- Moritz Bleibtreu
- Rainer Bock
- Martin Brambach
- Johannes Brandrup
- Daniel Brühl
- Detlev Buck
- Fabian Busch
- August Diehl
- Justus von Dohnányi
- Daniel Fehlow
- Heino Ferch
- Paul Frielinghaus
- Benno Fürmann
- Tom Gerhardt
- Frank Giering
- Stefan Gossler
- Wolfram Grandezka
- Josef Hader
- Leander Haußmann
- Thomas Heinze
- Alexander Held
- Michael Herbig
- Volker Herold
- Willi Herren
- Bernhard Hoëcker
- Dietrich Hollinderbäumer
- Marc Hosemann
- Stefan Jürgens
- Rick Kavanian
- Mark Keller
- Michael Kessler
- Herbert Knaup
- Markus Knüfken
- Sebastian Koch
- Oliver Korittke
- Konrad Krauss
- Thomas Kretschmann
- Joachim Król
- Hardy Krüger Jr.
- Dani Levy
- Jan Josef Liefers
- Thomas Limpinsel
- Florian Lukas
- Oliver Masucci
- Ulrich Matthes
- Hans Werner Meyer
- Wotan Wilke Möhring
- Tobias Moretti
- Ingo Naujoks
- Ulrich Noethen
- Götz Otto
- Bastian Pastewka
- Matthias Paul
- Andreas Pietschmann
- Axel Prahl
- Armin Rohde
- Michael Roll
- Ilja Rosendahl
- Benjamin Sadler
- Tobias Schenke
- Helge Schneider
- Til Schweiger
- Matthias Schweighöfer
- Axel Siefer
- Hilmi Sözer
- Robert Stadlober
- Hans Steinberg
- Rainer Strecker
- Devid Striesow
- Wolfgang Stumph
- Jürgen Vogel
- Kai Wiesinger
- Klaus Zmorek
- Haydar Zorlu

Women

- Mariella Ahrens
- Muriel Baumeister
- Marie Bäumer
- Meret Becker
- Sabine Bohlmann
- Anna Brüggemann
- Yvonne de Bark
- Gesine Cukrowski
- Julia Dahmen
- Ellen ten Damme
- Maruschka Detmers
- Anke Engelke
- Verona Feldbusch
- Veronica Ferres
- Hendrikje Fitz
- Ulrike Folkerts
- Ulrike Frank
- Martina Gedeck
- Julia Haacke
- Eva Habermann
- Cosma Shiva Hagen
- Rhea Harder
- Wolke Hegenbarth
- Mavie Hörbiger
- Nina Hoss
- Julia Hummer
- Rebecca Immanuel
- Julia Jentsch
- Salome Kammer
- Alexandra Kamp
- Sandra Keller
- Sonja Kirchberger
- Anja Kling
- Anja Knauer
- Juliane Köhler
- Ann-Kathrin Kramer
- Nicolette Krebitz
- Nina Kronjäger
- Nina Kunzendorf
- Florentine Lahme
- Miriam Lahnstein
- Alexandra Maria Lara
- Anna Loos
- Manou Lubowski
- Heike Makatsch
- Birgit Minichmayr
- Alexandra Neldel
- Veronika Neugebauer
- Laura Osswald
- Christiane Paul
- Nina Petri
- Franka Potente
- Simone Ritscher
- Sophie Rois
- Andrea Sawatzki
- Michaela Schaffrath
- Esther Schweins
- Jasmin Schwiers
- Rebecca Siemoneit-Barum
- Stefanie Stappenbeck
- Jasmin Tabatabai
- Laura Tonke
- Idil Üner
- Sybille Waury
- Tanja Wedhorn
- Carina Wiese
- Hanne Wolharn
- Felicitas Woll
- Emily Wood
- Natalia Wörner
- Marie Zielcke

== The 2000s ==
Men

- Marc Barthel
- Sebastian Blomberg
- Flula Borg
- Matthias Brandt
- Volker Bruch
- Wayne Carpendale
- Thomas Drechsel
- Stipe Erceg
- Florian David Fitz
- Francois Goeske
- Dennis Grabosch
- Jens Hartwig
- Christoph Maria Herbst
- Fabian Hinrichs
- Constantin von Jascheroff
- Felix von Jascheroff
- Joscha Kiefer
- Waldemar Kobus
- Peter Kurth
- Peer Kusmagk
- Mirko Lang
- Carlo Ljubek
- Bjarne Mädel
- Elyas M'Barek
- Milan Peschel
- Oliver Pocher
- Vincent Redetzki
- Lucas Reiber
- Mirco Reseg
- Max Riemelt
- Clemens Schick
- Tom Schilling
- Sebastian Schlemmer
- Jörn Schlönvoigt
- Hinnerk Schönemann
- Tobias Schönenberg
- Jochen Schropp
- David Schütter
- Jan Sosniok
- Axel Stein
- Andreas Stenschke
- Christian Ulmen
- Max von der Groeben
- Mark Waschke
- Jo Weil
- Dirk Weiler
- Philip Wiegratz
- Daniel Wiemer
- August Wittgenstein
- Tom Wlaschiha
- Oliver Wnuk
- Florian Wünsche
- Martin Wuttke
- Ronald Zehrfeld

Women

- Diana Amft
- Natalia Avelon
- Nadja Becker
- Sandra Borgmann
- Nina Bott
- Claudelle Deckert
- Kristina Dörfer
- Maren Eggert
- Sanna Englund
- Annette Frier
- Liv Lisa Fries
- Cornelia Gröschel
- Jella Haase
- Fritzi Haberlandt
- Karin Hanczewski
- Karoline Herfurth
- Hannah Herzsprung
- Martina Hill
- Alwara Höfels
- Bettina Hoppe
- Sandra Hüller
- Julika Jenkins
- Vanessa Jung
- Franziska Junge
- Paula Kalenberg
- Florence Kasumba
- Sibel Kekilli
- Friederike Kempter
- Imogen Kogge
- Nursel Köse
- Karina Kraushaar
- Janine Kunze
- Marleen Lohse
- Anna Maria Mühe
- Alexandra Neldel
- Ilona Otto
- Jana Pallaske
- Caroline Peters
- Annett Renneberg
- Paula Riemann
- Petra Schmidt-Schaller
- Maja Schöne
- Anna Schudt
- Katharina Schüttler
- Emma Schweiger
- Luna Schweiger
- Maria Simon
- Diana Staehly
- Stephanie Stumph
- Mina Tander
- Aylin Tezel
- Sabine Timoteo
- Jördis Triebel
- Nora Tschirner
- Jana Voosen
- Katharina Wackernagel
- Araba Walton
- Cordelia Wege
- Franziska Weisz
- Teresa Weißbach
- Tanja Wenzel
- Jenny Winkler
- Johanna Wokalek
- Susanne Wolff
- Bettina Zimmermann

== The 2010s ==
Men

- Daniel Axt
- Nicolai Borger
- Arne-Carlos Böttcher
- Vladimir Burlakov
- Jonas Dassler
- Louis Hofmann
- Stefan Konarske
- Patrick Mölleken
- Maximilian Mundt
- Jimi Blue Ochsenknecht
- Wilson Gonzalez Ochsenknecht
- Raúl Richter
- Thore Schölermann
- Albrecht Schuch
- Daniel Sträßer

Women

- Lea van Acken
- Jasna Fritzi Bauer
- Paula Beer
- Leonie Benesch
- Sira-Anna Faal
- Ruby O. Fee
- Jasmin Gassmann
- Sonja Gerhardt
- Mai Duong Kieu
- Lena Klenke
- Lilly Krug
- Stella Kunkat
- Jurassica Parka
- Alicia von Rittberg
- Lucy Scherer
- Karoline Schuch
- Emilia Schüle
- Theresa Underberg
- Lisa Vicari

== See also ==
- Category:German actors
- List of German Americans § Actors
- Category:Film by year
- List of years in film
- List of German people
- List of French actors
