= Ulrike Frank =

German actress

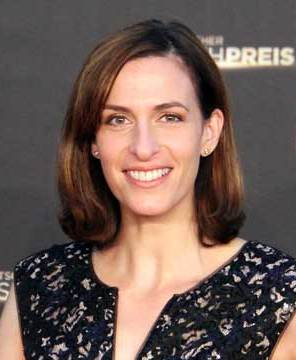
- Frank in 2012
- Born: Ulrike Frank; 1 February 1969 (age 57); Stuttgart, West Germany
- Years active: 1997-present
- Spouse: Marc Schubring (1999-present)
- Website: http://www.ulrikefrank.net

Ulrike Frank (born 1 February 1969) is a German actress known for her portrayal of Katrin Flemming on the daily drama Gute Zeiten, schlechte Zeiten.

== Career ==
=== Mallorca ===
In late 1998, ProSieben planned on launching its first soap opera. Grundy Ufa took an original idea which saw the series set on the Spanish island Majorca. The show Mallorca – Suche nach dem Paradies premiered in April 1999 with Ulrike Frank being an original cast member. Frank became more important to the show when it was revealed that she portrayed the first transsexual character in a German soap opera. Julia Breuer, Frank's character, choose Majorca to start over and create a life for her as a woman. However her secret was eventually discovered by Felipe who would eventually romance Julia after overcoming some obstacles. After almost one year on the year, Mallorca was canceled due to high production costs and ratings that rose too slowly for the network.

=== Gute Zeiten, schlechte Zeiten ===
In 2000, Frank was approached by RTL for the role of Tina Zimmermann in their new primetime soap opera Großstadtträume. The new format was a spin-off from Gute Zeiten, schlechte Zeiten and the role of Tina was an original cast member of the show, previously played by Sandra Keller. After negotiations with Keller for a return in the role fell through, the network decided to recast. Ulrike Frank first appeared in the role of Tina in Gute Zeiten, schlechte Zeiten on 27 April 2000. Her six-episode stint ended on 8 May 2000. Directly after her last appearance, Großstadtträume premiered. However ratings for the spin-off were extremely low and the network canceled the format after seven from 26 ordered episodes.

Two and half years later, Frank reappeared on Gute Zeiten, schlechte Zeiten. This time originating the role of architect and businesswoman Katrin Flemming. The role was on a recurring basis and after appearing on 30 December 2002, Frank left the programme once again on 11 April 2003; finishing filming in late February. However, the role was well received by viewers and after the show had to fill the void of a female antagonist, Frank was brought back the following year with reappearing on-screen on 5 April 2004. Frank has since become an important part of the series. Katrin's image from a cold businesswoman changed over the years with the character becoming a mother and discovering that nanny Jasmin Nowak is the daughter she gave up for adoption almost twenty years ago.

== Filmography ==
Year	Title	Role	Notes
1997	Parkhotel Stern	Mrs. Kessler	
1998	Balko	Makeup artist	
1998	Zerschmetterte Träume - Eine Liebe in Fesseln	Rita	
1998	Verbotene Liebe	Janine Meiser	
1998	SK-Babies	Secretary	
1999	Mallorca – Suche nach dem Paradies	Julia Breuer	
2000	Großstadtträume	Tina Zimmermann	spin-off of Gute Zeiten, Schlechte Zeiten
2000; 2002-2003, 2004-present	Gute Zeiten, schlechte Zeiten	Tina Zimmermann; Katrin Flemming-Gerner née Gabi Galuba	
2001	Kleiner Mann sucht großes Herz	Vivian Haeffner	
2002	Hinter Gittern - Der Frauenknast	Mrs. Gericke	
2005	Emilia	Countess Orsina	
2007	Der Mustervater 2 - Opa allein zu Haus	Regine Schaffrath	
2007	SOKO Wismar	Brunette	
2008	Ein Fall für Zwei	Michaela Weiss	
2008	Im Namen des Gesetzes	Silvia Kreibig	
2009	Leipzig Homicide	Sabrina Karstens	
2009	Mein Mann, seine Geliebte und ich	Receptionist Susanne	
2009	SOKO 5113	Ricarda Rickenbach	

- 2008: Im Namen des Gesetzes – Tödlicher Einbruch
- 2009: SOKO Leipzig – Ein neues Leben
- 2010: Alles was zählt
- 2020: SOKO München: Nackte Wahrheit
