= Haydar Zorlu =

Kurdish-German actor

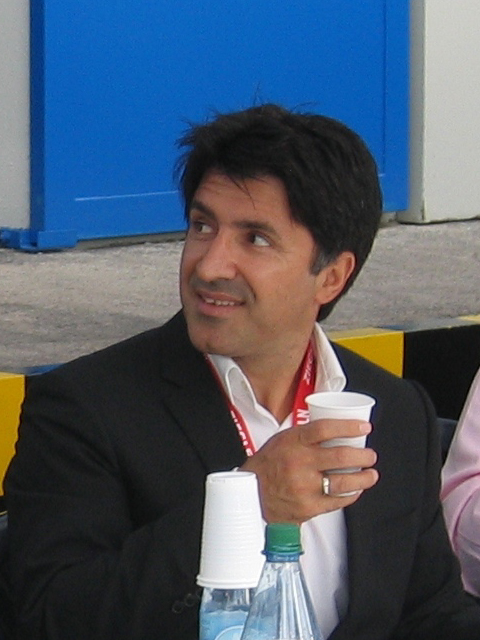
- Born: Haydar Zorlu; 4 May 1967 (age 59); Karlıova-Mikail, Turkey.
- Years active: 1996–present
- Website: http://www.haydar-zorlu.de/

Haydar Zorlu (born 4 May 1967 in Karlıova) is a Turkish-German actor.

== Filmography ==
=== Films ===
- 1988 Eine türkische Hochzeit
- 1996 Der Trainer
- 2001 Nothing Less Than the Best
- 2003 September
- 2003 Worst Case
- 2008 Halbzeit
- 2008 Belanglos

=== TV ===
- 1991-92 Türkei - Land, Leute und Sprache
- 1993 Sterne des Südens
- 1993 Tatort
- 1994 Die Sendung mit der Maus
- 1997 Ein todsicheres Ding
- 1998 Tatort
- 1998 Reise in die Nacht
- 1998-2008 Die Anrheiner
- 1999 Ein starkes Team
- 2003 Die Kumpel
- 2002 Westentaschenvenus
- 2003 Wilde Engel
- 2003 SOKO 5113
- 2004 Forsthaus Falkenau
- 2004-2005 Verschollen
- 2005 Küstenwache
- 2006 Esir Kalpler
- 2006 Ein Fall für zwei
- 2006 Verschleppt - Kein Weg zurück, Regie: Hansjörg Thurn
- 2006-2008 Oben Ohne
- 2009 Oben Ohne - Weihnachts Special "DU HEILIGE NACHT"

=== Theatre ===
- 1989 Moritz Jäger in "Die Weber" - Stadttheater Oberhausen
- 1989 -1991 Ensemblemitglied des Arkadas Theater`s Köln
- 1995 Agathe, Schlucki, Dieter, Leichi, Kontrolleur u.a. in "Linie 1" - Theater in der Christallerie Wadgassen
- 1996 Haroon in "Borderline" - Wupper Theater
- 1996 Naim in "Vermummte" - Wupper Theater / Freies Werkstatt-Theater Köln
- 2005 Entertainer, Thorndyke, Bürgermeister u.a. in "Die Marx Brothers Radio Show" - Arkadas Theater Köln
- 2009 Faust, Mephisto, Gretchen u.a. in "Goethes Faust" als Schauspielsolo - Bühne der Kulturen Köln
