= Gute Zeiten, schlechte Zeiten =

German television soap opera

- Genre: Serial drama
- Created by: Reg Watson
- Based on: The Restless Years
- Written by: Joscha Valentin
- Country of origin: Germany
- Original language: German
- No. of episodes: 8,700

Production
- Producers: Marie Hölker; Guido Reinhardt; Rainer Wemcken
- Production locations: Berlin; Potsdam, Germany
- Running time: 25 minutes (without commercial break)
- Production company: UFA Serial Drama

Original release
- Network: RTL
- Release: 11 May 1992 – present

Related
- Großstadtträume; Unter uns Alles was zählt

Gute Zeiten, schlechte Zeiten ("Good Times, Bad Times"), often abbreviated GZSZ, is a long-running German television soap opera, first broadcast on RTL in 1992. The programme concerns the lives of a fictional neighborhood in Germany's capital city Berlin. Over the years the soap opera tends to have an overhaul of young people in their late teens and early twenties, targeting a young viewership.

Based on the Australian format The Restless Years, which first was successfully adapted in the Netherlands as Goede tijden, slechte tijden, the German version took the scripts of the first 230 episodes, even though heavily rewritten, from the original. After the first year, Gute Zeiten, schlechte Zeiten started using original material.

The programme started off with low ratings and was panned by critics. However the network believed in the success of the show and by the autumn of 1993, a serial killer storyline helped to improve the ratings, making GZSZ a success. It not only won its time slot but became also one of the highest-rated programmes, normally ranking in the Top 10 ratings of the day. In 2002, the soap opera reached its peak with over seven million viewers turning in for the 2,500th episode.

Gute Zeiten, schlechte Zeiten has tackled with issues like homosexuality, incest, rape, drug addiction, various crimes, breast cancer, bulimia, underage drinking, adoption and mental illnesses.

Frank-Thomas Mende and Lisa Riecken were the last original cast members when leaving the show in 2010. Wolfgang Bahro, who joined the show in February 1993, has become the longest-serving actor on the show since. He is described as having become a cult-like figure among soap opera stars, frequently noticed in public. Other long-serving actors are Daniel Fehlow, who joined the show in 1996 but has since taken several breaks, and Felix von Jascheroff, who's part of the programme since 2001. Ulrike Frank is currently the longest-serving female cast member, being part of the soap opera in her current role since 2002.

GZSZ launched several successful careers in the music industry. The first being original cast member Andreas Elsholz. The most successful ones were Jeanette Biedermann and Yvonne Catterfeld, who both left the soap opera at the peak of their careers.

== Production ==
The idea to establish a daily soap opera in Germany first came in late 1991. Production company Grundy UFA (now UFA Serial Drama) adapted the Australian format The Restless Years from Reg Watson. The programme was successfully launched in the Netherlands one year earlier. Production on the German adaption, officially now called Gute Zeiten, schlechte Zeiten, started on 23 February 1992. The first episode aired almost three months later, on 11 May 1992.

The programme was filmed in a studio in Berlin-Tempelhof for the first three years. In October 1995, production of the show moved to the Filmstudio Babelsberg. This required several set changes. In the beginning it wasn't certain where the show was set. However, in its second year it was established that Gute Zeiten, schlechte Zeiten is set in Berlin. The city has since been used to identify with the format; using several skyline settings in an episode.

Rainer Wemcken and Guido Reinhardt have the primary responsibility over the production, with Marie Hölker controlling the day-to-day production and overseeing the writing of the programme. The writing is controlled by a team of writers who are known to shift between the other Grundy UFA soaps Alles was zählt, Verbotene Liebe and Unter uns. Gute Zeiten, schlechte Zeiten uses a darker setting than the other three soap operas with sets appearing in modern, mostly dark, colors.

== Cast ==
as of November 2025

- Wolfgang Bahro as Dr. Hans-Joachim "Jo" Gerner
- Daniel Fehlow as Leon Moreno (1996 - 2023)
- Felix von Jascheroff as John Bachmann
- Ulrike Frank as Katrin Flemming, née Gabriele "Gabi" Galuba
- Anne Menden as Emily Wiedmann
- Jörn Schlönvoigt as Philip Höfer
- Thomas Drechsel as Max "Tuner" Krüger (2009 - 2024)
- Eva Mona Rodekirchen as Maren Seefeld
- Iris Mareike Steen as Lilly Seefeld
- Felix van Deventer as Jonas Seefeld
- Maria Wedig as Nina Navarro
- Charlott Reschke as Johanna Flemming
- Niklas Osterloh as Paul Wiedmann
- Chryssanthi Kavazi as Laura Bachmann
- Patrick Heinrich as Erik Fritsche
- Olivia Marei as Toni Ahrens
- Timur Ülker as Nihat Güney
- Gisa Zach as Yvonne Bode
- Lennart Borchert as Moritz Bode
- Jan Kittmann as Tobias Evers
- Lars Pape as Michael Bode
- Nina Ensmann as Jessica Reichelt
- Patrick Fernandez (actor) as Carlos Lopez
- Lara Dandelion Seibert as Zoe Lopez
- Josefin Bressel as Alicia Bäumler
- Anna-Katharina Fecher as Matilda Gerner
- Onno Buß as Julian Gerner

== Spin-off ==
In 2000, at the peak of the programmes success, RTL wanted to launch a spin-off, called Großstadtträume (City Dreams), of the highest-rated soap opera. Actress Sandra Keller who vacated her popular role as Tina Zimmermann four years earlier was set to return to star in the new format. However negotiations between the network and Keller fell through. The network decided to recast the popular role. Ulrike Frank, who just starred in the canceled Mallorca – Suche nach dem Paradies, was cast. The character of Tina shortly returned to Gute Zeiten, schlechte Zeiten with Frank in the role.

Großstadtträume premiered on 8 May 2000. Next to Ulrike Frank as Tina, the show saw the return of Victoria Sturm as Milla Engel. Laurent Daniels, who played Philip Krüger, switched from GZSZ to its spin-off. The programme was about the launch of a lifestyle print magazine, called POOL. It targeted an older viewership well below the age of twenty.

The network ordered 26 episodes. However the show wasn't a success. After the premiere the ratings dropped dramatically and Großstadtträume was canceled after only seven aired episodes. The programme was never aired again since then.

=== Parody ===
In the German comedy series Freitag Nacht News, they had a sketch called Schlechte Zeiten, schlechte Zeiten (Bad Times, Bad Times or SZSZ) which was a parody of the soap opera. The sketch featured four men who lived together in an apartment, and suffered from severe depression. In every sketch, they kill each other but often kill themselves. Although three of the characters were unnamed, the fourth person was named Clive, whose face was never seen. He is always shown dead in every sketch, mostly hanging himself.

== See also ==
- Goede tijden, slechte tijden
