= Sandra Keller =

Sandra Keller may refer to:

- Sandra Keller, birth name of Sultaana Freeman, American Muslim
- Sandra Keller (actress), German actress
