= Bahro =

Bahro is a surname. Notable people with the surname include:

- Rudolf Bahro (1935–1997), German philosopher, political figure and author
- Wolfgang Bahro (born 1960), German actor
