= A Girl Named Willow =

2025 German film by Mike Mario

- Ein Mädchen namens Willow
- Directed by: Mike Marzuk
- Written by: Gesa Scheibner
- Based on: Ein Mädchen namens Willow by Sabine Bohlmann
- Produced by: Ewa Karlström; Andreas Ulmke-Smeaton; Bernd Schiller
- Starring: Ava Petsch; Cora Trube; Anna von Seld; Mary Tölle; Golo Euler; Max Giermann; Diana Amft; Sibylle Canonica; Melika Foroutan; Michael Ostrowski; Tom Hanslmaier; Fritzi Hennemann; Sabine Bohlmann
- Cinematography: Matthias Pötsch
- Music by: Fabian Römer
- Production companies: SamFilm; Constantin Film; Alias Film
- Distributed by: Constantin Film (Germany); Constantin-Film (Austria)
- Release date: 27 February 2025
- Countries: Germany; Austria
- Language: German

A Girl Named Willow is a 2025 German-Austrian feature film directed by Mike Marzuk and starring Ava Petsch. The screenplay by Gesa Scheibner is based on the children's book series by Sabine Bohlmann.

== Plot ==
What is Willow supposed to do with the forest? , She inherits it from her great aunt Alwina, who also left her with a crooked house and her witchcraft. Above all, she has to find three girls who also have the gift of witchcraft and save the forest together. But will Willow even accept this inheritance, with all the responsibility it brings?, Willow is not alone, because Rufus the fox will not leave her side.

== Production and background ==
Filming took place from June 18 to August 12, 2024, in Bavaria and Austria. The film was produced by Munich-based SamFilm, Constantin Film, and Vienna-based Alias Film, with Ewa Karlström, Andreas Ulmke-Smeaton, and Bernd Schiller serving as producers. The film was supported by the Austrian Film Institute, the FilmFernsehFonds Bayern, the German Federal Film Board, and the German Federal Film Fund.

Matthias Pötsch was the cameraman, Fabian Römer composed the music, and Stefany Pohlmann and Gwendolin Clayton were responsible for casting. Axel Traun was responsible for sound design, Monika Buttinger for costume design, Bertram Reiter for production design, and Danijela Brdar for make-up. Sabine Bohlmann, the author of the children's book series on which the film is based, also made a guest appearance.

== Release ==
The premiere was on February 23, 2025 at the Mathäser Filmpalast in Munich.

In Austria, Germany and Switzerland the film was released in cinemas on February 27, 2025

== Reception ==
Peter Wohlleben tells BILD: "For me as a forester, it's always exciting to see how forest themes are translated into feature films. To put it bluntly: This has been brilliantly done! 'A Girl Called Willow' is a classic all-ages film, making it suitable for the whole family—and therefore for me, too."

Thomas Schultze praises in SPOT media "sensitive family entertainment that takes its target audience seriously and gives them a magical cinema visit."

Yannick Vollweiler awarded the film six out of ten on film-rezensionen.de. The script of this typical coming-of-age family film with witches and magic has some weaknesses. Nevertheless, the film conveys its messages about friendship, solidarity, and a connection to nature in a magical and very heartfelt way.

Christoph Petersen rated the production on filmstarts.de with 3.5 out of 5 stars. Young adult stories with magical fantasy elements are a dime a dozen these days. Such loving adaptations as this are much rarer.

Chris Schinke described the film on blickpunktfilm.de as both enjoyable and contemplative family entertainment with all the right ingredients. It scores points with strong performances from the young actresses and an imaginative and visually sophisticated production design, enhanced by subtle special effects.

Website mucke-und-mehr.de (6/10 points) judged it to be a "nicely made, but not very innovative children's film." The young actresses acted well, and the plot offered excitement, fun, and imaginative witchy moments for this target audience, but there were hardly any surprises.

== Publication ==
- Sabine Bohlmann: Ein Mädchen namens Willow: Das Buch zum Film, Planet Girl Verlag, Stuttgart 2025, ISBN 978-3-522-50893-3
- Sabine Bohlmann: Ein Mädchen namens Willow, Der Hörverlag, München 2025, ISBN 978-3-8445-5319-2
