= Frielinghaus =

Frielinghaus is a German surname. Notable people with the surname include:

- Gustav Frielinghaus (1912–1963), German Luftwaffe ace
- Paul Frielinghaus (born 1959), German actor
