= Julia Richter =

Julia Richter may refer to:

- Julia Richter (actress) (born 1970), German actress
- Julia Richter (rower) (born 1988), German rower
