= Oliver Korittke =

German actor (born 1968)

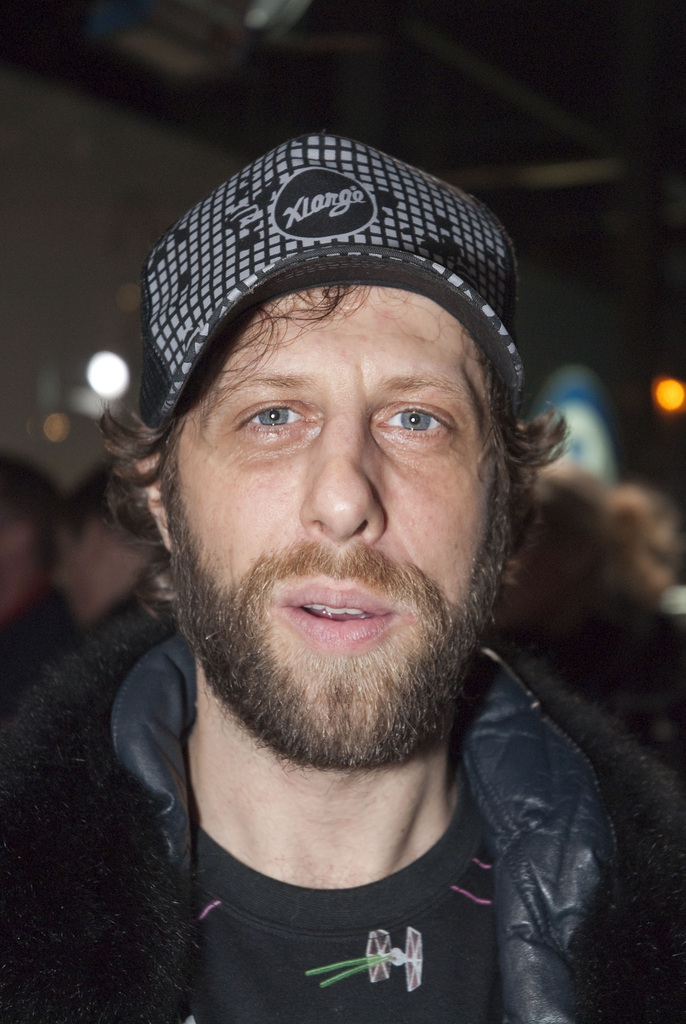
- Born: 6 April 1968 (age 58); West Berlin, West Germany
- Occupation: Actor
- Years active: 1972–present

Oliver Korittke (born 6 April 1968) is a German actor. He appeared in more than one hundred films since 1972. In Wilsberg he plays the role of Ekkehard Talkötter, an official tax inspector.

== Selected filmography ==
Year	Title	Role	Notes
1991	Keep on Running	Zorro	
1996	Rohe Ostern	Frieder Kopp	
1997	Cologne's Finest	Oliver Dretzke	TV film
1998	Dunckel	Freddy Dunckel	TV film
1999	Bang Boom Bang	Keek	
2000	A Handful of Grass	Udo Hellkamp	
2000	Sumo Bruno	Kalle	
2002	Poppitz	Uwe Schalk	
2002	The Year of the First Kiss	Tristan	
2004	Agnes and His Brothers	Rudi	
2008	Evet, I Do!	Dirk Heidenreich	
2011	My Life in Orange	Gopal	
2012	Men Do What They Can	Günther	
2012	Die Männer der Emden	Kluthe	
2012	Guardians		
2014	Playing Doctor	Tom	
2014	Die Schlikkerfrauen	Malte	TV film
2015	Alky Alky	Siggi	
2016	How Men Talk About Women	DJ	
