= Sumo Bruno =

2000 film by Lenard Fritz Krawinkel

- Movie poster
- Sumo Bruno – Dein schwerster Gegner bist du selbst
- Directed by: Lenard Fritz Krawinkel
- Written by: Jan Berger; Marius Del Mestre; Lenard Fritz Krawinkel
- Produced by: Dirk Reinhold; Friedrich-Carl Wachs
- Starring: Hakan Orbeyi; Oliver Korittke; Julia Richter; Martin Seifert; Thomas Drechsel; Tim Wilde; Martin Semmelrogge
- Cinematography: Piotr Lenar
- Edited by: Adam Boome
- Music by: Biber Gullatz; Eckes Malz
- Production companies: Senator Entertainment; Babelsberg Studio
- Distributed by: BFF Babelsberg Film; Central Film Verleih; Senator Film Verleih
- Release dates: 2 September 2000 (Montreal World Film Festival); 18 January 2001 (Germany)
- Running time: 99 minutes
- Country: Germany
- Language: German

Sumo Bruno (originally titled Sumo Bruno – Dein schwerster Gegner bist du selbst) is a 2000 German comedy drama film directed by Lenard Fritz Krawinkel and starring Hakan Orbeyi, Oliver Korittke, Julia Richter, Martin Seifert, Thomas Drechsel, Tim Wilde and Martin Semmelrogge. The film was produced and distributed by Babelsberg Studio.

The film was marketed with the tagline "Your hardest opponent is yourself" ("Dein schwerster Gegner bist du selbst.")

== Plot ==
Bruno (Hakan Orbeyi) is a lonely, unhappy, 400-pound man that has recently lost his railroad job on his 30th birthday, and was informed by a tax-collecting bailiff (Hans-Jochen Röhrig) that he's in danger of losing his home due to very late payments. That same day, Bruno's shifty and opportunistic friend, Kalle (Oliver Korittke), who loses a job for the third time in a year, has intentions to enter his overweight friend into the upcoming Sumo World championship that is being held in the city of Riesa, hoping that the fifty thousand marks purse will change their lives for the better.

Later that night, Kalle talks Bruno into a double-date with Gina (Esther Esche) and Bärbel (Sandra Steffi), and going to the local discothèque, Lucky's Temple of Dance. Feeling out of place, Bruno goes to the men's restroom, where he meets the beautiful Anna (Julia Richter), who's hiding from her boneheaded boyfriend, Lucky (Tim Wilde), the owner of the club. Unbeknownst to Bruno, Kalle's plan was to volunteer his strong, heavyset buddy into a sumo wrestling contest, to show Bruno that he's good at it, and the winner gets a prize for two hundred marks. As expected, Bruno mops-up the inferior competition and wins the prize, but unexpectedly, he's challenged by Lucky to a boxing match. Bruno timidly decides to relinquish the prize rather than take part in an unnecessary public display of physicality, so an obliviously agitated Kalle wisely decides to leave the club with Bruno in tow.

Kalle does all he can to try to convince his big-bodied partner that his destiny is sumo, but after the contest fiasco, Bruno doesn't want to hear it. The next morning, due to circumstances involving a ten year old, chubby, bullied boy named Timo (Thomas Drechsel), Bruno finally decides to enter the sumo championship. Bruno is invited by Timo to meets his dance trained mother, who turns out to be the same Anna that was at the club last night. One thing leads to another, and Anna is intrigued by Timo sudden friendliness with Bruno, and the two agreed to get to know each other over dinner. Later on, Bruno informs Kalle that he's had a change of heart and is entering the championship, and the excited Kalle springs into action to seek out a proper sumo coach.

Kalle introduces the very German, but Japanese-loving sushi chef Akashi (Martin Seifert) to Bruno and Timo. At first, Akashi is dismissive of Bruno who doesn't appear to have the heart, skill or dedication to be a good sumo wrestler, but after pleads from Kalle and Bruno, Akashi changes his mind and instructs the trio gather there to begin constructing a dohyō, so Bruno can begin his training.

Despite the fact that complications have arisen, like clashes with Akashi, money problems and attraction for Anna, Bruno does himself with qualifying in the preliminary and will represent Germany as one of two German participants along with rival R.F. Schröder (Jörg Brümmer). Unknown to Bruno, Kalle is in trouble because he owes money to a loan shark, and the ill-temper Lucky's jealousy of Anna for spending time with the big hearted sumotori-in-making, eventually drives Anna and Timo away. Kalle's machinations to boost his very large friend's popularity and make some money ends-up backfiring badly, with the end result seriously damaging Bruno's confidence which negatively impacts his blossoming relationship with Anna and Timo. Bruno is left directionless at this point and the sumo championship is the next day.

Fate intervenes, and after much soul-searching, Bruno smartly decides to go back to Akashi and pleads for his help. Akashi accepts and prepares Bruno for the sporting event. While, Akashi, Kalle and Gina are there supporting Bruno, Anna and Timo are preparing to leave Riesa, when the brutish Lucky shows-up and tries in vain to change Anna and Timo's minds in returning home with him. Bruno progresses to the finale to face-off against the current world champion, Emmanuel Yarbrough of the U.S.A. Before it can happen, Bruno decides to find Anna and Timo, and arrives in time to put the very arrogant Lucky in his place once and for all. Bruno and Anna make amends, and the three depart for the arena so Bruno can battle Yarbrough.

Akashi, Kalle, Gina, Anna and Timo looked on as Bruno and Yarbrough intensely wrestled. The two giants seemed to be equally matched until Yarbrough throws Bruno to the ground with one arm, winning the chamipionship. To the audiences aplause, Bruno bows to Yarbrough and leaves the arena.

== Cast ==
- Hakan Orbeyi as Bruno
- Oliver Korittke as Kalle
- Julia Richter as Anna
- Martin Seifert as Akashi
- Thomas Drechsel as Timo
- Tim Wilde as Lucky
- Hans-Jochen Röhrig as Bailiff
- Esther Esche as Gina
- Sandra Steffi as Bärbel
- Uwe Steimle as Branch manager
- Timo Dierkes as Loan shark
- Jörg Brümmer as R.F. Schröder
- Martin Semmelrogge as Ecki
- Emmanuel Yarbrough as himself

== Production ==
=== Development ===
Director Krawinkel said about Sumo Bruno, that he "wanted to tell the story of an overweight person who gets going again, as a representative of all who know what it feels like when life has temporarily come to a halt. It was not about raising the pity of the audience and even less about pushing the topic of being overweight. I was looking for a metaphor. Sumo is such a metaphor. It's a sport the first rule of which says: The fatter, the better..."

Krawinkel comments on casting: "For the main role of Sumo Bruno, I was looking for an overweight actor with an erotic appeal. Consciously, I wanted to cast the role in contrast to the cliché "being fat is being flabby and disgusting". The first actors that I saw weighed about 220 pounds and didn't come up to my idea of a credible sumo wrestler. My Bruno was to weigh at least 300 pounds, a condition which reduced our choices considerably. The team and I soon realized that if we wanted a German for the role, he would have to be an amateur actor.

One night, when we were leaving a cinema in Hanover, my wife said to me: "Look at him over there, that's Sumo Bruno for you". The gigantic Hakan Orbeyi was sitting on a bar stool, wearing a muscle shirt when the outdoor temperature was five degrees Celsius. I immediately went over to him and introduced myself. While we were talking, a girl came up, kissed him and said: "See you later". A few minutes later, another girl came along. She was given a tender hug, and I thought: "Here, at last, is an overweight person who's really at ease with himself".

While it was Krawinkel intentions to tell his story of one person's belief that he can overcome any obstacle to better himself and fully believed that the sport of sumo wrestling would be a great source of inspiration, he didn't think it would be a problem for the officials at the International Sumo Federation (ISF) in Japan, but it became an issue. The Japanese newspaper Yomiuri Shimbun had reported that the ISF were very annoyed that “they let the leading actor smuggled into the arena and shot the scene with him leading the German team and parading around at the Opening Ceremony. Can you imagine doing anything like that at any other sport's World Championship events?," fumed an official at the Japan Sumo Federation official.” Because of this the ISF officials “did not allow Japanese sumo wrestlers to take part in the movie since it was unhappy with the humorous and unconventional portrayal of a German sumo wrestler.”

=== Music ===
The score was composed and conducted by Biber Gullatz and Eckes Malz, and was produced and mixed in the First Take Studios, Weinheim. The opening and ending song "What I Wish to Be" (lyrics by Deborah Wargon), was sung by the Children's and Youth Choir of the Theaters of the City Heidelberg, headed by Heike Kiefner.

== Release ==
Sumo Bruno was theatrically released on 18 January 2001 in Germany, but previously played at multiple film festivals: Montreal World Film Festival on 2 September 2000; Singapore International Film Festival in 2000; Kinofest Linen on 17 November 2000, and Gothenburg Film Festival in 2001.

A DVD of the film was released on 20 October 2008 by Senator Home Entertainment.

== Reception ==
Sumo Bruno has received generally favorable reviews from viewers. In the Variety magazine, Eddie Cockerel states that "Sumo Bruno aims for underdog charm as a rural lad becomes a decent sumo against wildly improbable odds. Yet too-gentle fantasy is less than sum of its parts, more a series of good ideas about friendship and determination than cohesive, dramatic sports saga." Other reviewers had opined that the film was "Germany's answer to The Full Monty (1997) - absolutely gorgeous!", and that it is "a light, but immensely satisfying film", also calling it an "underrated German movie with a big star."
