= Sibylle Rauch =

German film actress, nude model and pornographic actress

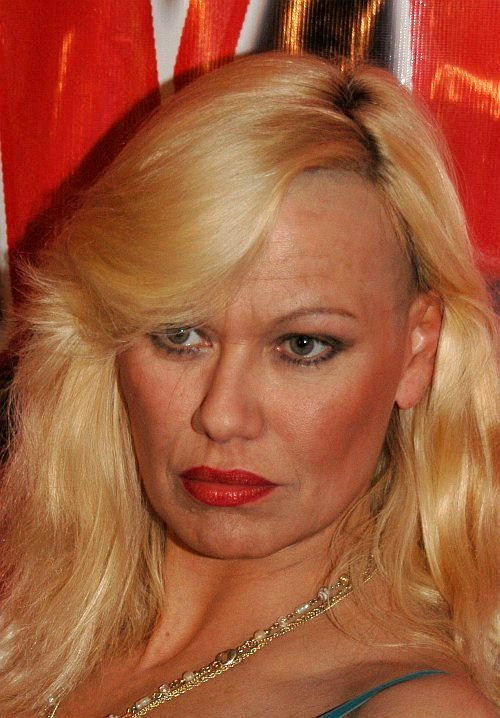
- Rauch in December 2005

Playboy centerfold appearance
- June 1979 German edition

Personal details
- Born: Erika Roswitha Rauch; 14 June 1960 (age 66) Munich, West Germany

Erika Roswitha Rauch (born 14 June 1960) is a German film actress, nude model, and pornographic actress.

== Life and career ==
She was born Erika Roswitha Rauch on 14 June 1960 in Munich, Germany. She was the Playmate of June 1979 in the German edition of Playboy, and appeared fifteen more times. She also appeared in several films, most notably the role of Frieda in Hot Bubblegum, the third film in the Israeli Lemon Popsicle series. In 1982 she debuted as a singer, with the single "So long, Goodbye/Playmate".

She entered the adult industry in 1987, accepting a 100,000 Mark salary offered by the former porn actress and then producer Teresa Orlowski to star in the two-parts pornographic film Born for Love. She later appeared in more than 20 pornographic films.

Her real life events inspired the 2001 two-parts RTL TV movie Das sündige Mädchen; her role was played by Anna Loos.

In 2004 she was heavily injured by the performance artist Marko König during the rehearsal of a stage show.

In 2012 she appeared in a series of commercial shorts promoting the company "GogoMil".

== See also ==
- List of German actors
