= Rebecca Siemoneit-Barum =

German actress and entrepreneur

Rebecca Siemoneit-Barum (born 20 October 1977 in Ulm as Rebecca Siemoneit) is a German actress and entrepreneur. She became known from 1990 as "Iffi" Zenker in Lindenstraße.

== Life ==
=== Circus Barum ===
She is the daughter of Gerd Siemoneit-Barum (1931–2021), the director of Circus Barum, and his wife Rosalind, an English actress, dancer and singer. She grew up as a circus child and artist (performer), completed basic acrobatic training from the age of three and performed a goat act for the first time at the age of four. At the age of nine, she performed as a contortion acrobat in the circus ring together with two other children; she had been trained in this by artists from the Barum ensemble.

From 2001 until the circus ceased performing in October 2008, she was the artistic director of the circus. In December 2012 and 2013, she produced the Circus Barum Christmas Spectacular in Göttingen.

=== Television career ===
From 1990 (episode 220) to 2020 (episode 1758), she played the role of Iphigenie "Iffi" Zenker in the Lindenstraße. For this role, she moved to Cologne at the age of twelve while her family went on tour with the circus. Between episodes 1411 in December 2012 and 1513 in December 2014, she took a break during which she appeared in numerous theater productions.

In 1995, she hosted the youth magazine Lollo rosso. In 2015, she took part in the RTL reality show Ich bin ein Star - Holt mich hier raus! and finished in seventh place. At the same time, she released the duet Wir sind immer noch hier with Willi Herren. In January 2017, she took second place as a singer in the RTL show It Takes 2 alongside her coach Gil Ofarim.

=== Political commitment ===
In 2010, she joined the CDU and ran for the Landkreis Northeim district council and the Einbeck town council in the 2011 local elections in Lower Saxony.

Since January 2021, she has been working in the organizational team for the entertainment program of the State Garden Show Bad Gandersheim 2023 in Lower Saxony.

=== Private life ===
Rebecca Siemoneit-Barum is Jewish and both a German and British citizen. She is married to the artist Pierre Bauer, with whom she ran the business of the production company Barum und Bauer Performance GmbH. The couple has two children.

In October 2005, she became the patron of the association Alopecia Areata Deutschland e. V.

Since 2020 she has been patron of the Alliance against Depression South Lower Saxony.

== Filmography ==
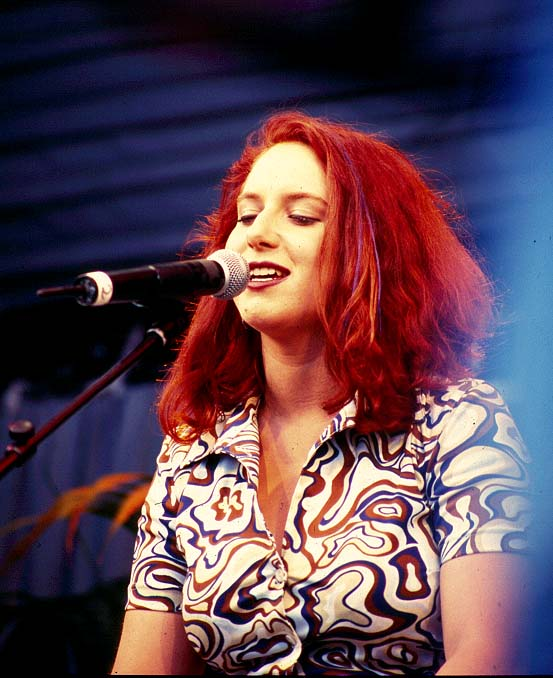
Rebecca Siemoneit-Barum, 1997

=== As an actress ===
- 1990–2012, 2014-2020: Lindenstraße (674 episodes)
- 1995: Entführung aus der Lindenstraße
- 2022: Die Passion

=== Other television appearances ===
- 1995: Lollo rosso
- 2007: Extreme Activity
- 2009, 2015: Das perfekte Promi-Dinner
- 2015: Ich bin ein Star - Holt mich hier raus!
- 2017: It Takes 2
- 2017: Dinner Party
- 2020: Rosin's Fat Fight
