= Princess Lillifee and the Little Unicorn =

- German theatrical release poster
- Directed by: Ansgar Niebuhr; Hubert Weiland
- Written by: Gabriele Walther
- Starring: Maresa Sedlmeier
- Production companies: Caligari Film; WunderWerk
- Distributed by: Universum Film; Buena Vista International
- Release date: 1 September 2011
- Running time: 72 minutes
- Country: Germany
- Language: German

Princess Lillifee and the Little Unicorn (German: Prinzessin Lillifee und das kleine Einhorn) is a 2011 German fantasy animated film directed by Ansgar Niebuhr and Hubert Weiland. It is the sequel to the 2009 film Prinzessin Lillifee.

== Cast ==
- Maresa Sedlmeier as Lillifee (voice)
- Carin Tietze as Rosalie (voice)
- Sabine Bohlmann as Clara (voice)
- Stefan Günther as Iwan (voice)
- Julia Haacke as Cindy (voice)
- Gudo Hoegel as Carlos (voice)
- Sandra Schwittau as Pupsi (voice)
- Jochen Striebeck as Crunch (voice)
- Roman Wolko as Prinz Tau (voice)
- Patrick Roche as Prinz Eis (voice)
- Max Felder as Fabian (voice)
- Dagmar Dempe as Fabians Mutter (voice)
