= Verschollen =

- Starring: Berrit Arnold, Hendrik Borgmann, Katrin Brockmann, Haydar Zorlu
- Country of origin: Germany

Production
- Running time: 60 min

Original release
- Network: RTL
- Release: 2004 – 2005

Verschollen was a German TV show about a group of people after their plane crashes on an island. It had a run of 28 episodes on RTL Television before being canceled because of low ratings.

Cast	Character
Hendrik Borgmann	Nils Jung
Katrin Brockmann	Claudia Rother
Ben Bela Böhm	Leon Claasen
Ingrit Dohse	Marita Sengerling
Anuk Ens	Bianca Hölscher
Sylke Hannasky	Clara Schwarz
Nele Jonca	Svenja Hölscher
Uli Pleßmann	Clemens Bartsch
Uwe Rathsam	Simon Claasen
Antonia Reß	Natascha Jungblut
Aline Hochscheid	Sabrina
Gerhard Roiß	Hans Tresko Baran
Nicolas Solar Lozier	Sascha Hölscher
Alexander Rossi	Udo Wachter
Berrit Arnold	Nicole Mauerhoff
Haydar Zorlu	Jussef Reimann
