= Agnes and His Brothers =

2004 film

- Agnes und seine Brüder
- Directed by: Oskar Roehler
- Written by: Oskar Roehler
- Produced by: Stefan Arndt
- Starring: Martin Weiß; Moritz Bleibtreu; Herbert Knaup; Katja Riemann; Tom Schilling
- Cinematography: Carl-Friedrich Koschnick
- Edited by: Juliane Lorenz; Simone Hofmann
- Music by: Martin Todsharow
- Production company: X Filme Creative Pool
- Distributed by: X Verleih AG (through Warner Bros.)
- Release date: 14 October 2004
- Running time: 115 minutes
- Country: Germany
- Language: German

Agnes and His Brothers (German: Agnes und seine Brüder) is a 2004 film directed by Oskar Roehler.

== Plot ==
Three very different siblings: Hans-Jörg, a librarian who is a sex addict; Werner, a politician in a troubled marriage with a son who enjoys discrediting his father; Martin, who is now Agnes after having a gender-reassignment operation. Agnes works as a dancer and is suffering from unrequited love.

== Cast ==
- Martin Weiß as Agnes Tschirner
- Moritz Bleibtreu as Hans-Jörg Tschirner
- Herbert Knaup as Werner Tschirner
- Katja Riemann as Signe
- Tom Schilling as Ralf
- Suzan Anbeh as Desiree
- Vadim Glowna as Günther
- Margit Carstensen as Roxy
- Lee Daniels as Henry
- Marie Zielcke as Nadine
- Oliver Korittke as Rudi
- Martin Semmelrogge as Manni Moneto
- Martin Feifel as Hannes
- Sven Martinek as Jürgen
- Til Schweiger as Freund in Bibliothek

== Reception ==
On the review aggregator website Rotten Tomatoes, 40% of 20 critics' reviews are positive, with an average rating of 5.1/10. Metacritic, which uses a weighted average, assigned the film a score of 46 out of 100, based on 11 critics, indicating "mixed or average" reviews.
