= Klaus Zmorek =

German actor (born 1957)

Klaus Zmorek (born 4 December 1957 in Lemberg, West Germany) is a German actor.

Zmorek's first contract role was in the soap opera Mallorca – Suche nach dem Paradies as the business man Rolf Stein from 1999 to 2000. After one year, the Broadcast ProSieben cancelled the soap, because of too much costs. Then he played in many TV films and made a row of guest appearances in TV series. Since January 25, 2007 he has played the villain Adrian Degenhardt on Das Erste soap Verbotene Liebe.

== Selected filmography ==
- Curiosity & the Cat (1999), as Flagg
- Mallorca – Suche nach dem Paradies (soap opera, 1999–2000), as Rolf Stein
- Verbotene Liebe (Forbidden Love) (soap opera, 2007– ), as Adrian Degenhardt
