= Sterne des Südens =

- Starring: Mark Keller, Volker Lippmann, Maria Ketikidou, Caroline Schröder
- Country of origin: Germany
- No. of seasons: 4
- No. of episodes: 42

Production
- Running time: 45 minutes

Original release
- Network: ARD
- Release: 1992 – 1996

Sterne des Südens is a German television series.

== See also ==
- List of German television series
