= Daniel Fehlow =

German television and voice actor

Daniel Fehlow (born 21 February 1975 in West Berlin, West Germany) is a German television and voice actor.

He has played Leon Moreno in the German television soap opera Gute Zeiten, schlechte Zeiten since 1996. He is the voice of Channing Tatum in films dubbed into German.

== Television filmography ==
- Gute Zeiten, schlechte Zeiten as Leon Moreno (1996–present)
- Verfolgt! – Mädchenjagd auf der Autobahn as Stefan (1998)
- Hinter dem Regenbogen as Oliver (1999)
- Schloss Einstein as bodyguard Bodo Kaminski (2001)
- Alarm für Cobra 11 – Die Autobahnpolizei as Ben Winter (2007)
