= Arne-Carlos Böttcher =

German model and actor (born 1998)

Arne-Carlos Böttcher (born 19 February 1998, in Emden) is a German model and actor, best known for his work on the television series Kreuzfahrt ins Glück (2020), Notruf Hafenkante (2022), and SOKO Potsdam (2025). In 2024, he was the lead in a production of Johann Wolfgang von Goethe's Die Laune des Verliebten at Rheinsberg Palace. As a model, he has been featured in campaigns for C&A, Henkel, Adidas, Lidl, and Zalando.
