= Willi Herren =

German actor (1975–2021)

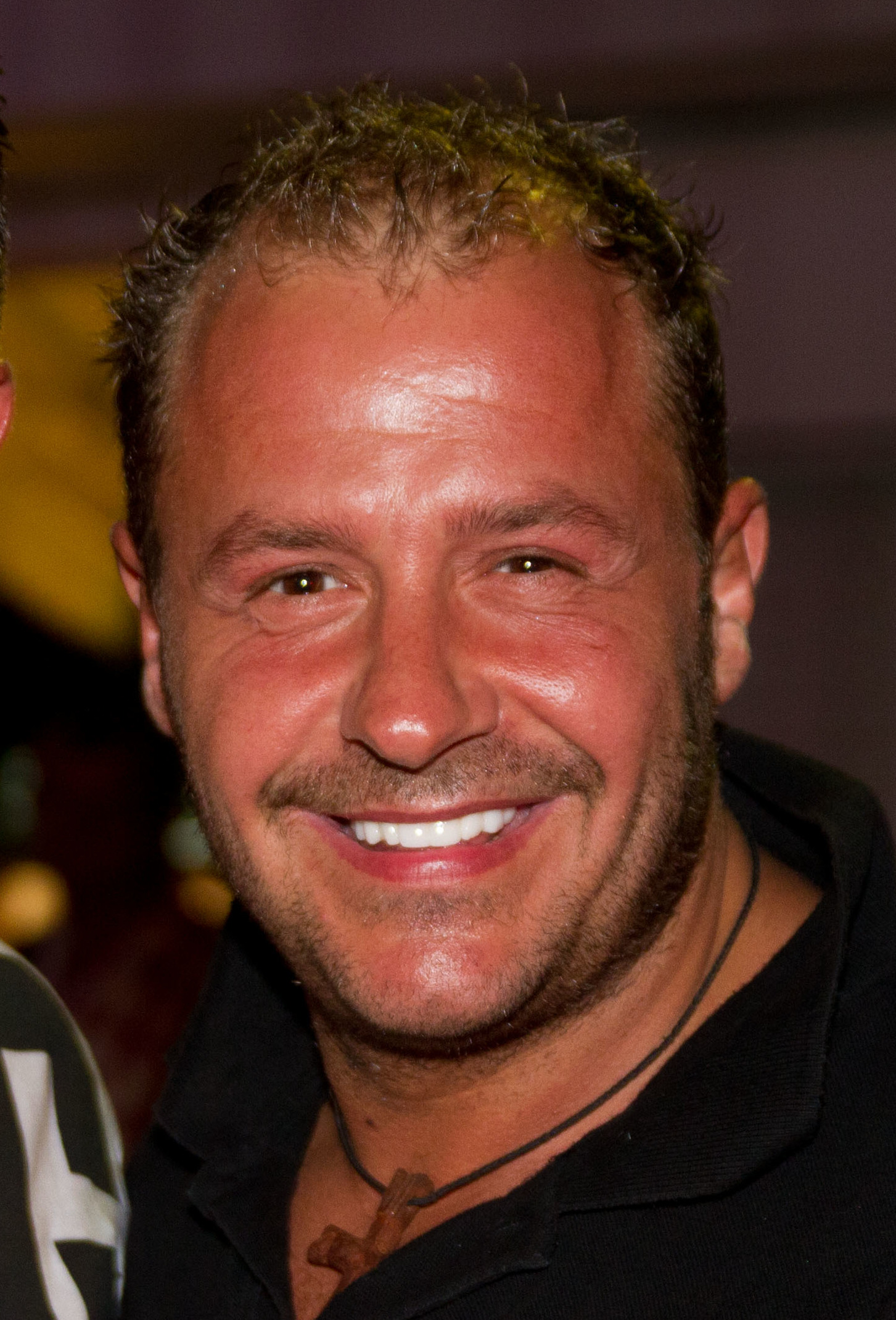
- Herren in 2011
- Born: 17 June 1975; Cologne, West Germany
- Died: 20 April 2021 (aged 45); Cologne, Germany
- Occupation: Actor

Willi Herren (17 June 1975 – 20 April 2021) was a German actor and singer.

== Filmography ==
- Der bewegte Mann (1994)
- Die Wache (1994, 2001, 2002)
- Entführung aus der Lindenstraße (1995)
- Jede Menge Leben (1996)
- Ein Bayer auf Rügen (1996)
- Ein Fall für zwei (1997)
- Nikola (1997)
- Lola and Billy the Kid (1999)
- Nesthocker – Familie zu verschenken (2000)
- SK Kölsch (2001)
- St. Angela (2001, 2002)
- Tatort (2002)
- Hallo Robbie! (2002, 2005)
- Das Amt (2002)
- Verbotene Liebe (2003)
- Cologne P.D. (2003)
- Hausmeister Krause – Ordnung muss sein (2007)
- Alerta Cobra (2008)
- Einstein (2018)
