= Thomas Drechsel =

German actor (born 1987)

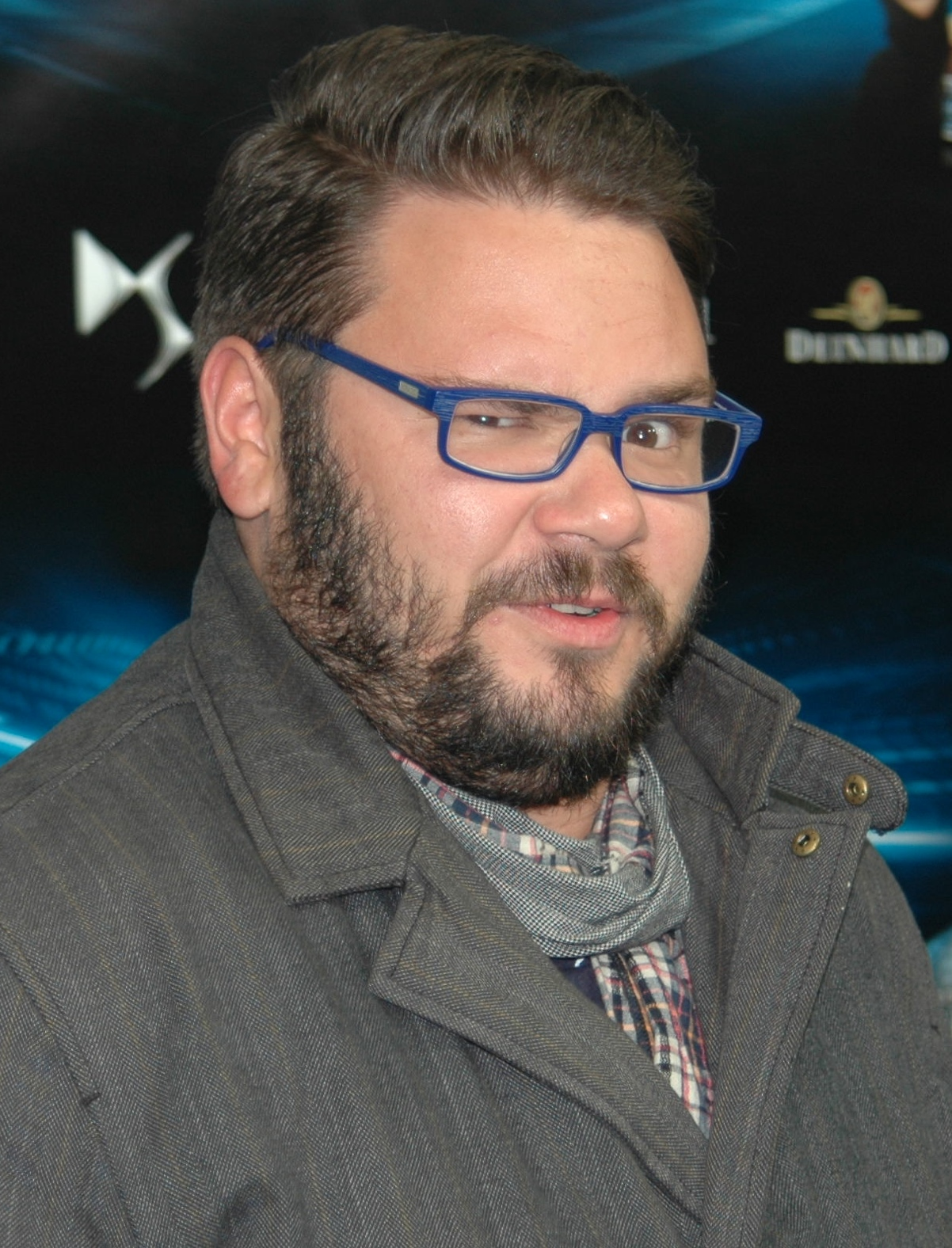
- Thomas Drechsel, 2014
- Born: 15 January 1987 (age 38); Potsdam, East Germany
- Occupation: Actor

Thomas Drechsel (born 15 January 1987, in Potsdam) is a German actor.

Drechsel is best known for his portrayal of Max "Tuner" Krüger in the German soap Gute Zeiten, schlechte Zeiten.

== Filmography ==
Film
Year	Title	Role	Notes
2000	Sumo Bruno	Timo	
2002	The Year of the First Kiss	Specki	
2004	Before the Fall	Hefe	
2006	Atomised	Bruno (young)	
Television
Year	Title	Role	Notes
2008	Anna und die Liebe		
2009	Polizeiruf 110	Ingo Stiller	1 episode
2009-2021	Gute Zeiten, schlechte Zeiten	Max 'Tuner' Krüger	812 episodes
2010	Leipzig Homicide	Michael Wöllnitz	1 episode
