= Claus Theo Gärtner =

German actor

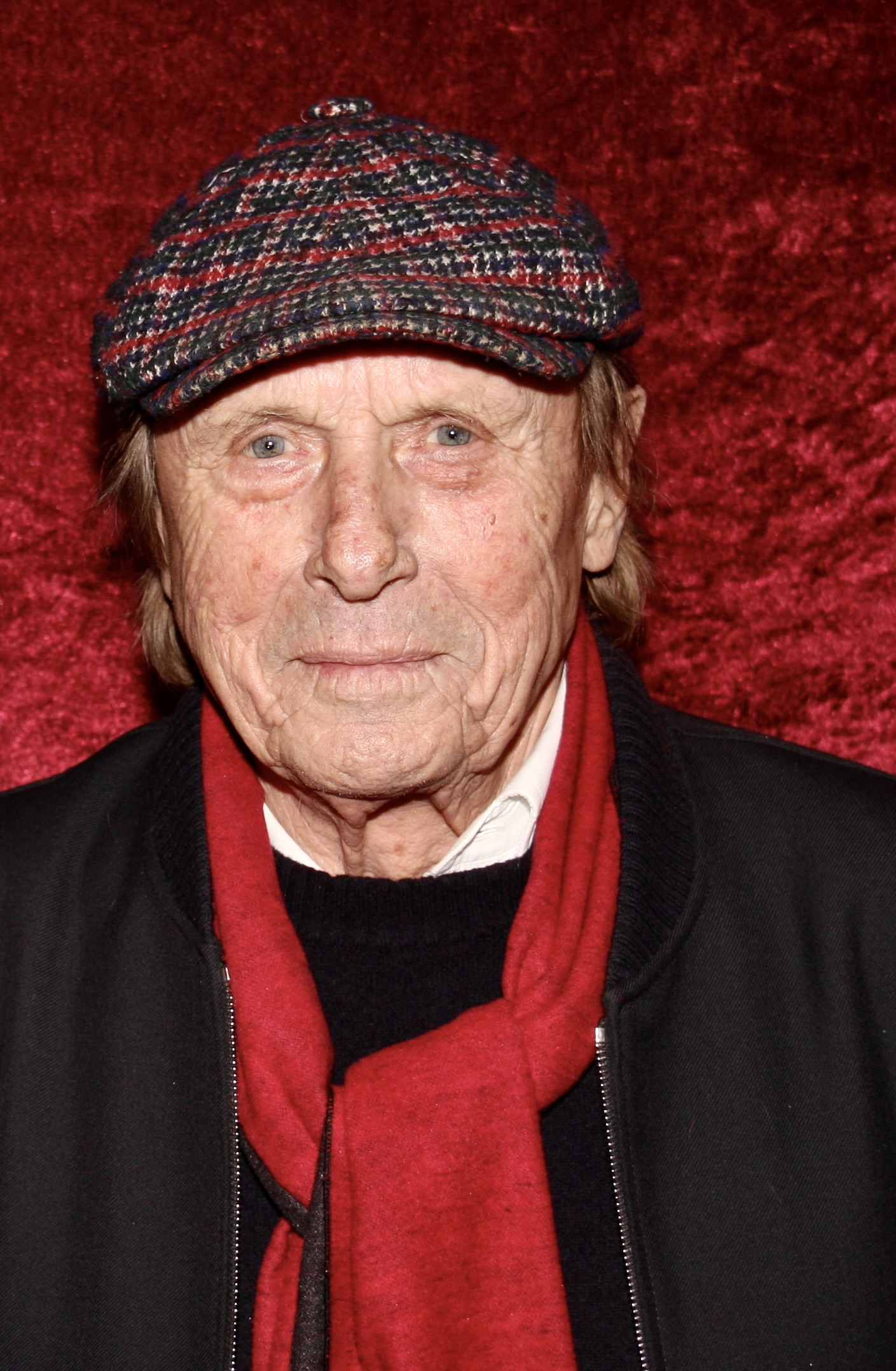
- Gärtner in 2022
- Born: Claus Theo Gärtner; 19 April 1943 (age 83); Berlin, Germany
- Spouse: Sarah Würgler (2008–present)

Claus Theo Gärtner (born 19 April 1943) is a German television actor mainly known for his role as Josef Matula, the main character in the German detective show series Ein Fall für Zwei (A Case For Two). Between 1981 and 2013, Gärtner starred as this private detective in 300 episodes. Gärtner is also known as a car enthusiast. Since 1967 he participated in numerous car races, and drove cars as a test-driver for a German manufacturer. He did his own car stunts in the series.

Gärtner spent his youth in Austria, the United States and southeastern Asia. He has studied music in Braunschweig and Hannover. He made his theatre debut in Göttingen. In his youth, Gärtner was actively involved in the activities of the German socialistic students' association.

On 20 September 2008 he married his fiancée Sarah Würgler, 35 years his junior, in Winterthur. Prior to their wedding, Claus Theo and Sarah had been in a relationship for 6 years.

He lives in Basel, Switzerland.
