= Friederike Bethmann-Unzelmann =

Christiana Friederike Augustine Conradine Bethmann-Unzelmann, née Flittner (24 January 1760 — 16 August 1815) was a German actress and singer.

== Life ==
Friederike Bethmann-Unzelmann was born in Gotha, the daughter of the ducal Saxon government registrar Jacques Flittner and his wife Carolina Sophia Augusta Hartmann. She received her vocal training from her stepfather, the actor and singer Gustav Friedrich Großmann, and made her debut at the Stadttheater in Mainz in 1777. There she also joined Abel Seyler's ensemble, but later switched to her stepfather's troupe. In her first engagements, she sang almost exclusively in operas, where she had her first great successes as an interpreter of Wolfgang Amadeus Mozart.

At the age of 25, Friederike Flittner married the actor and singer Karl Wilhelm Ferdinand Unzelmann in Mainz in 1786, with whom she was engaged in Mainz until 1788. She had three children with him, the actor Karl Wolfgang Unzelmann (1786–1843), the daughter Louise Wilhelmine Elisabeth Henriette (baptized 25 June 1790 in Berlin; † 14 May 1852 there), who later married the actor Friedrich Josef Korntheuer, and the xylographer Friedrich Unzelmann (1797–1854).

In 1788, she went to Berlin with her husband and, like him, became a member of the ensemble at the court theater. She worked there very successfully until she divorced her husband in 1803. In 1805, Friederike Unzelmann married the actor Heinrich Bethmann for the second time.

Thanks to her success in Berlin, Bethmann-Unzelmann received many offers, which she subsequently accepted. Smaller tours took her to the theaters in Hamburg, Leipzig and Vienna. She gave guest performances at the theaters in Braunschweig, Frankfurt am Main, Munich and Prague, which were enthusiastically received by critics and audiences alike. In 1804, she sang the title role in the premiere of Friedrich Heinrich Himmel's opera Fanchon, das Leiermädchen at his request. Other brilliant roles included "Konstanze" in Die Entführung aus dem Serail, "the Countess" in Figaro's Marriage and "Fiordiligi" in Così fan tutte by Wolfgang Amadeus Mozart. But she was also convincing in the works of Gotthold Ephraim Lessing and William Shakespeare.

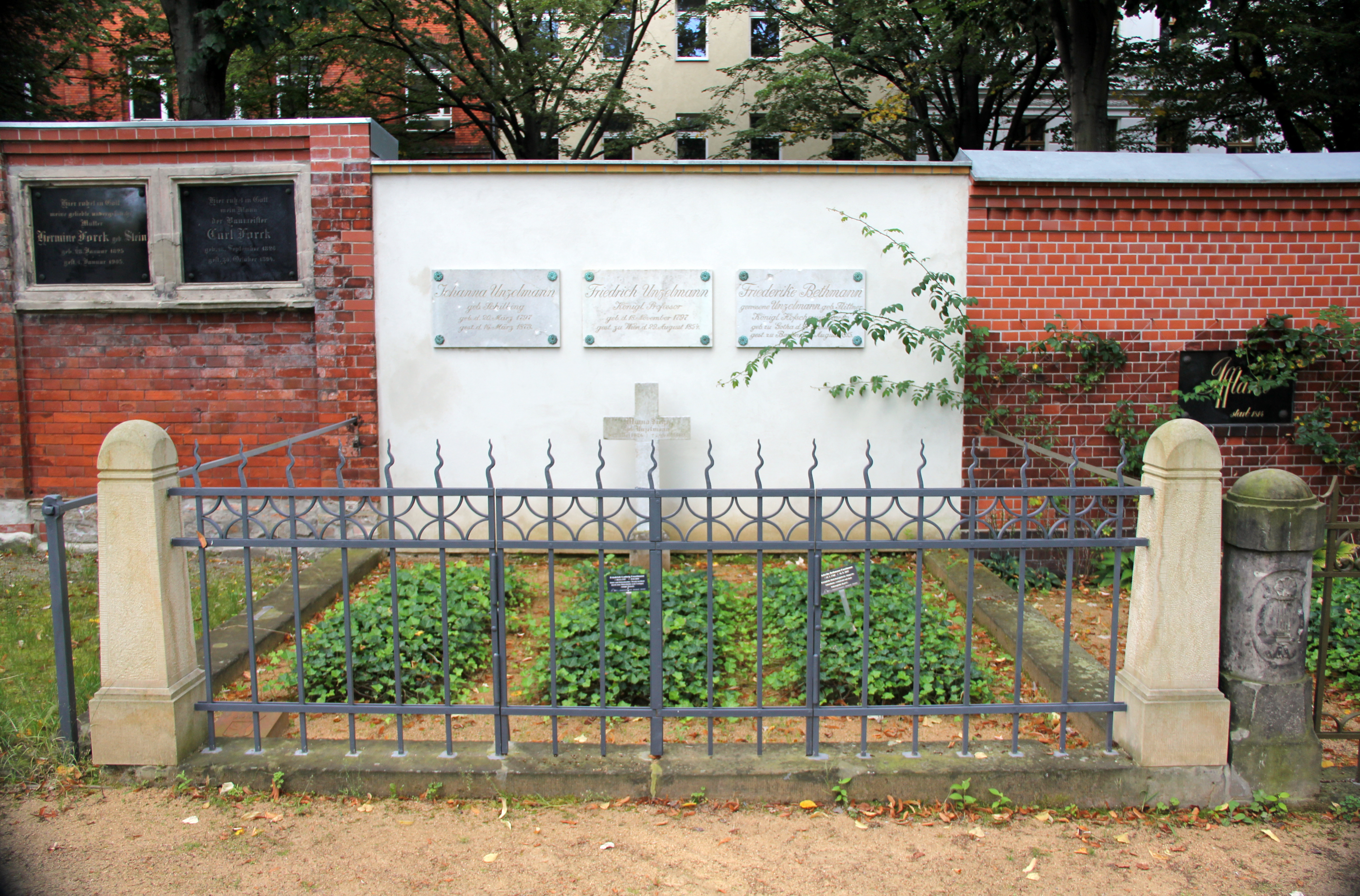
The Unzelmann family grave in Berlin-Kreuzberg

In 1810, Friederike Bethmann-Unzelmann experienced a scandal at the Berlin theater: During a performance of the opera Sargines (Ferdinando Paër), her daughter was booed on stage by the audience. Friederike Bethmann-Unzelmann then stormed the stage, took her daughter with her out of indignation and swore never to perform again. Through the mediation of August Wilhelm Iffland, however, she reversed her decision.

At the age of 55, Friederike Bethmann-Unzelmann died suddenly and unexpectedly on 16 August 1815, in Berlin. Her final resting place is the Unzelmann family grave at Friedhof II der Jerusalems- und Neuen Kirche in Berlin-Kreuzberg. She lies there next to her son Friedrich Unzelmann (1797–1854) and his wife Johanna née Schilling (1797–1873). Three marble plaques with the names of the deceased are attached to the plastered grave wall. A pedestal marble cross stands in front of it. The site is bordered at the front by a grille.

== Pupils (selection) ==
- Louise von Holtei

== Literature ==
- Irmgard Laskus: Friederike Bethmann-Unzelmann: Versuch einer Rekonstruktion ihrer Schauspielkunst auf Grund ihrer Hauptrollen. Kraus, Nendeln 1978, ISBN 3-262-00516-9 (reprint of the Leipzig 1927 edition)
- Walter Kunze (1955). "Bethmann-Unzelmann, Friederike". Neue Deutsche Biographie (in German). Vol. 2. Berlin: Duncker & Humblot. pp. 193–193. (full text online).
- August Förster (1875). "Bethmann-Unzelmann, Friederike Auguste Konradine" . Allgemeine Deutsche Biographie (in German). Vol. 2. Leipzig: Duncker & Humblot. p. 573.
