= Jurassica Parka =

German drag queen

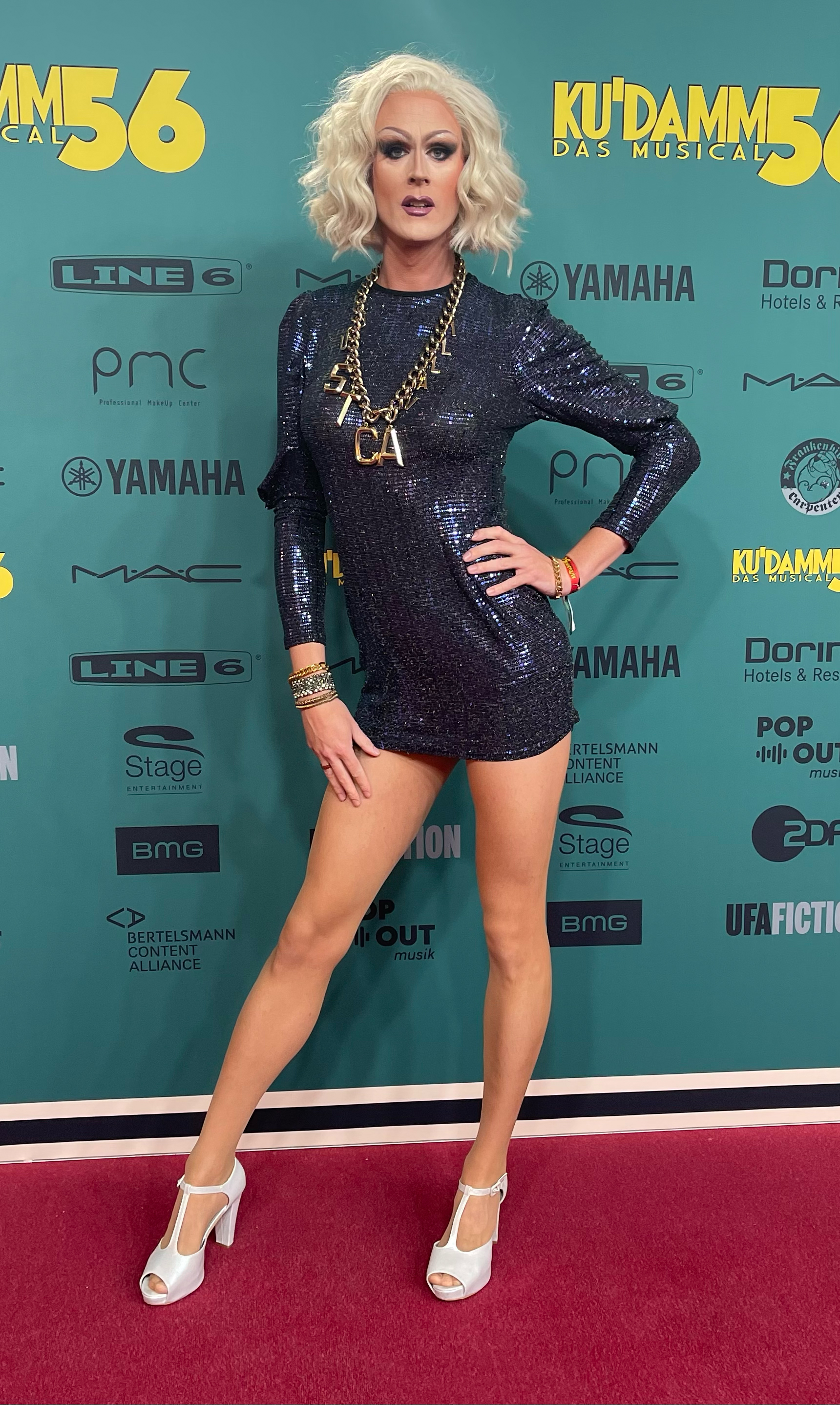
Jurassica Parka in November 2021

Jurassica Parka, born as Mario Olszinski (17 October 1979 in Berlin-Neukölln), is a German drag queen who works as a television presenter, entertainment artist, author, and YouTuber.

Mario Olszinski was born on 17 October 1979 in Berlin-Neukölln and resides in Berlin. He has openly identified himself as homosexual since he was 19. He studied communication design and worked at the advertising agency Scholz & Friends in the early years. Until 2024, Olszinski worked as a graphic artist at the publishing house Special Media SDL, which publishes the queer magazine Siegessäule among others.

In October 2025, it became known that Olszinski had been legally sentenced in 2023 to a fine of 160 daily rates of 70 euros each for the distribution of child pornography materials. The offence dated back to 2021. According to a spokesman for the public prosecutor's office, Olszinski had uploaded several images in the form of a collage to Twitter. Information on who was depicted in those images was not made available.

In May 2026, the Berlin public prosecutor's office brought charges against Olszinski on suspicion of possessing child and youth pornographic content. He was accused of keeping inappropriate image and video files on several electronic devices in his apartment in July 2025. A total of 131 files was allegedly found on multiple notebooks, hard drives, a Mac and an iPhone. The investigation began based on a report from the U.S.-based National Center for Missing & Exploited Children linked to an IP address used online which led to the search of Olszinski's apartment. Olszinski initially did not comment on the allegations. The district court at Tiergarten would decide on whether to admit the charges and open the main proceedings, until which the presumption of innocence applied.

== Work ==
Olszinki's artistic persona Jurassica Parka has been part of the Berlin's queer nightlife since the early 2000s. Between 2004 and 2006, she organized the party series Heydey at Kinzo, and between 2009 and 2011 the series Bollox at Loreley near Alexanderplatz. She was a resident DJ at the gay party GMF and was also booked internationally as a DJ. Until 2019, she regularly performed in various European cities including Copenhagen, Vienna, Zurich, Leipzig, Munich, Hamburg, and Cologne. At the SchwuZ, Parka has been hosting the gay party series Popkicker since 2012.

Since 2011, Parka has run a YouTube channel combining a personality show, video blog, and comedy. In April 2011, she launched the comedy format Attraktiv – Das Starmagazin, which was also broadcast on the Berlin local TV station ALEX Berlin from February 2012 to 2017.

In 2014, Parka was named "Miss CSD 2014" and led the Berlin Christopher Street Day parade together with Klaus Wowereit. In the same year, she began her column Jurassica Parka's Schlachteplatte in the Berlin city magazine Siegessäule. It was considered the magazine's most-read section until it ended in mid-2017. In 2014, Parka launched the late-night show Paillette geht immer at the Berlin Kabarett Anstalt in Kreuzberg. Since the COVID-19 pandemic, the show has also been regularly streamed via her YouTube channel.

In 2016, Parka produced the full-playback musical show The Golden Gmilfs, in which she and fellow drag queens Margot Schlönzke, Destiny Drescher, Ryan Stecken, Pan Am, and Tom Bola portrayed characters inspired by the TV series The Golden Girls. In the same year, she hosted the show Forum Fatal on Radio Fritz. Parka appeared in a Skyy Vodka commercial in 2019, in a Sparda-Bank advertisement in 2019, and in a campaign for Hermes in 2020.

In October 2020, Parka launched the podcast Parka und Schlönzke together with Margot Schlönzke. In it, they reviewed the happenings from the past month and discussed selected news from society, politics, and entertainment. The podcast ended in August 2025. In 2021, she served as an ambassador for queer Berlin as part of the Place2Be.Berlin tourism campaign, an initiative of Special Media SDL. In February 2022, Parka launched her own podcast Paillette – Die Nachlese, offering behind-the-scenes insights into her late-night show Paillette geht immer. From July 2023 to August 2025, she worked as a tour guide in queer neighborhood tours in Berlin organized by Margot Schlönzke and other drag queens. In August 2023, she appeared as a guest on the cooking show Böhmi brutzelt with Jan Böhmermann.

== Podcasts ==
- 2020: Parka und Schlönzke with Margot Schlönzke
- 2022: Paillette – Die Nachlese

== Filmography ==
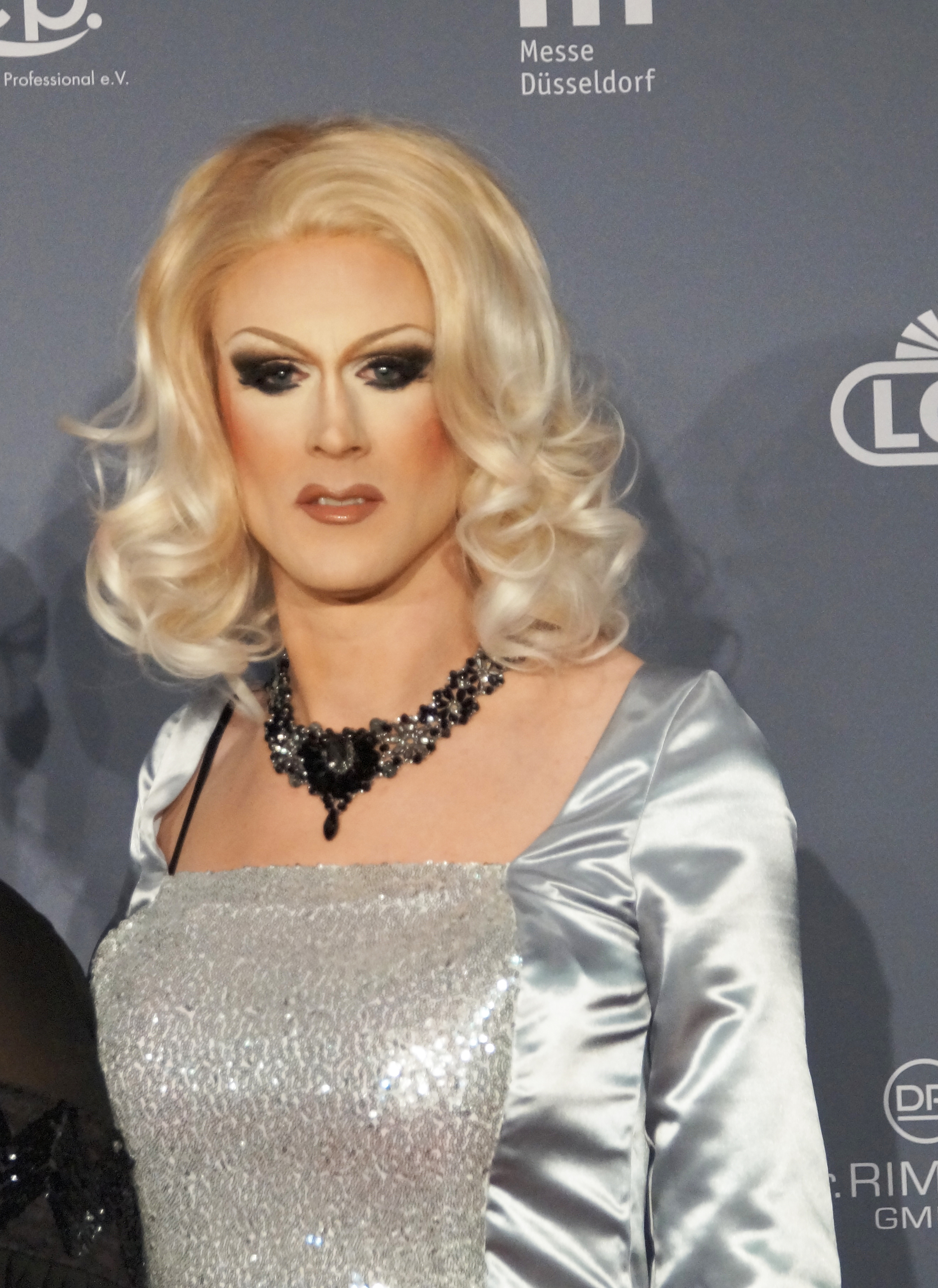
Jurassica Parka (2016)

Presenter

- 2011–2017: Attraktiv – Das Starmagazin (ALEX Berlin)
- 2016: Forum Fatal (Radio Fritz)

Actor

- 2009: L'Ingenue Libertine (Kurzfilm)
- 2015: Royal Fatal (Kinofilm)

As a guest

- 2016: Blickwechsel (ZDF)
- 2019: Laura Karasek – Zart am Limit (ZDFneo)
- 2017, 2018: Abendshow (RBB)
- 2020: ARD-Buffet (Das Erste)
- 2021: Late Night Alter (ZDFneo)
- 2023: Böhmi brutzelt (ZDFneo)

Television

- 2008, 2009: Taff – Die perfekte Party (Pro7)
- 2011: Die Einrichter (VOX)
- 2015: Mein Lokal, Dein Lokal (Kabel eins)
- 2020: Die schönsten Kieze (RBB)
