= Martin Semmelrogge =

German actor (born 1955)

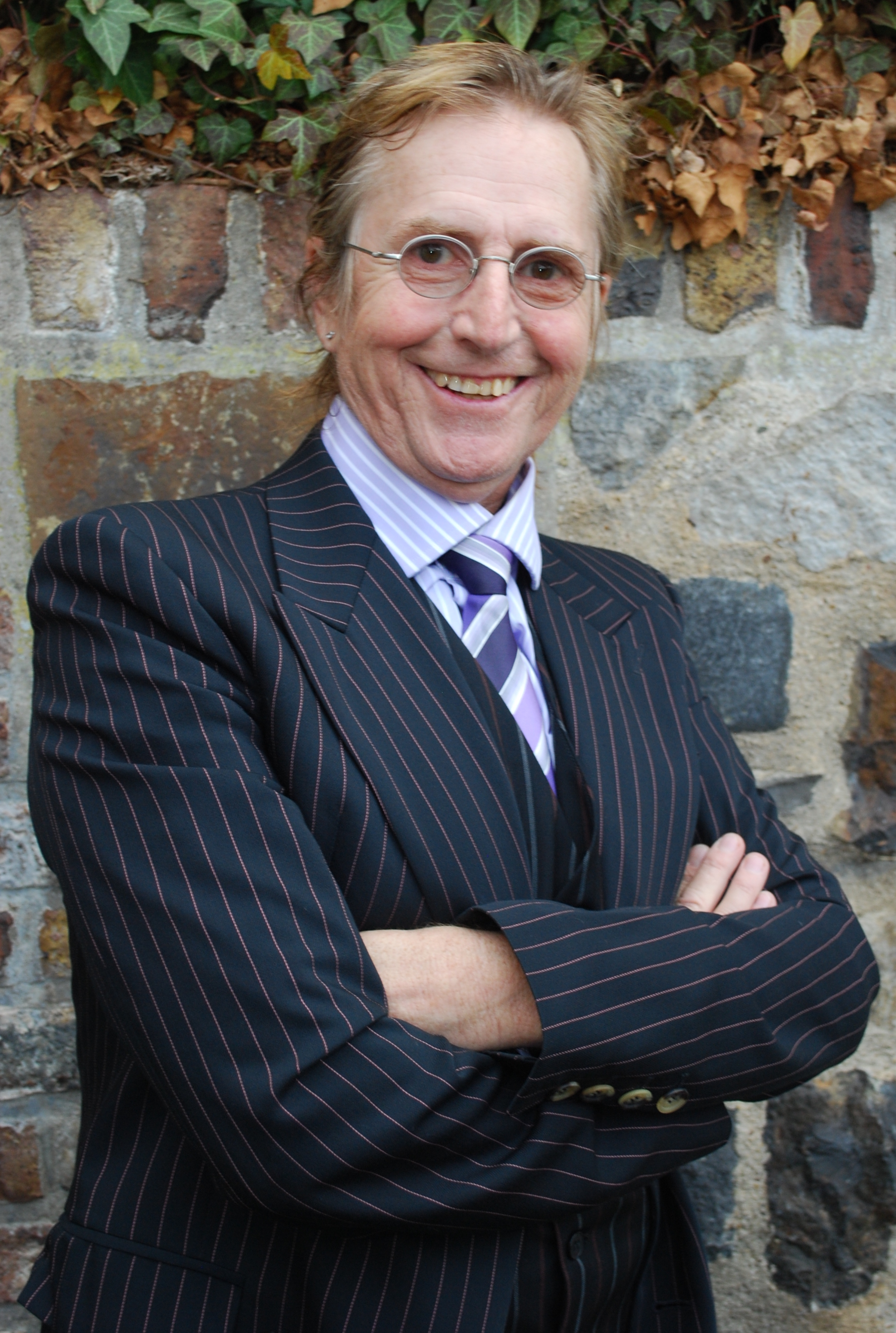
- Martin Semmelrogge (2011)
- Born: 8 December 1955 (age 69); Bad Boll, West Germany
- Occupation: Actor

Martin Semmelrogge (born 8 December 1955) is a German actor, best known for his role as the comical Second Watch Officer in the film Das Boot. His character was based on the real life World War II submarine officer Werner Herrmann.

Semmelrogge is the brother of actor Joachim Bernhard, who appeared in Das Boot as the religious sailor.

Like many of his Das Boot co-stars, Semmelrogge went on to have a successful career in German cinema.

== Filmography ==
- Tadellöser & Wolff (1975, TV miniseries), as Robert Kempowski
- Derrick - Season 4, Episode 1: "Yellow He" (1977, TV), as Alfred "Ali" Rabes
- Die Vorstadtkrokodile (1977, TV film), as Egon
- Derrick - Season 5, Episode 12: "Ute und Manuela" (1978, TV), as Hansi Stroppe
- Derrick - Season 8, Episode 8: "Prozente" (1981, TV), as Richard Siebert
- Das Boot (1981), as 2nd Lieutenant - 2WO
- Gib Gas – Ich will Spass (1983), as Andy Eckelmann (voice, uncredited)
- The Old Fox - Von Mord war nicht die Rede (1984) as Fritz Happner/Der Fuchs
- Siggi, the Street Cleaner (1984), as Bizeps
- Lichtschlag (1989), as Lichtschlag
- Justice (1993), as Lucky
- Schindler's List (1993), as SS Waffen Man
- Anna Maria – Eine Frau geht ihren Weg (1994–1997, TV series), as Josef Hauser
- Die Straßen von Berlin (1995–2000, TV series), as Jockel Pietsch
- Karakum (1994), as Brink
- Black Jack (1996, TV film), as Black Jack
- Werner: Eat My Dust!!! (1996), as Shorty (voice, uncredited)
- Life Is a Bluff (1996), as Heinzi
- Road to Palermo (1998), as Porsche Driver
- Bang Boom Bang (1999), as Schlucke
- Tower of the Firstborn (1999, TV film), as Geroq
- Manila (2000), as Franz
- Sumo Bruno (2000), as Ecki
- Now or Never: Time Is Money (2000), as Bruno
- Hostile Takeover (2001), as Beckmann
- A Goddamn Job (2001), as Kruse
- Girl (2001)
- Monsters, Inc. (2001), as Randall Boggs (German version)
- Paule und Julia (2002), as Walter
- 4 Freunde und 4 Pfoten (2003), as Franz Bommer
- Agnes and His Brothers (2004), as Manni Moneto
- Ludgers Fall (2006), as Kurier
- Neues vom Wixxer (2007), as Der scharfe Eddie
- Hardcover (2008), as Dealer
- Check It Out (2008), as Zahnarzt
- The Crocodiles (2009), as Minigolfplatzbesitzer
- Chaostage (2009), as Jan Kullmann
- Kopf oder Zahl (2009), as Eule
- Zeiten ändern dich (2010), as Tätowierer
- Kalte Karibik (2010), as Kurier
- Fahr zur Hölle (2011), as Teufel
- Breakdown Forest - Reise in den Abgrund (2016), as Eyck Rhoder
- Radio Heimat (2016), as Kumpel
- Limbo (2019), as Ozzy
