= Julia Richter (actress) =

German film and TV actress (born 1970)

- Born: 14 August 1970 (age 54)
- Occupation: Actress

Julia Richter (born 14 August 1970, in East Berlin) is a German film and TV actress. She trained at Berlin's Friedrichstadt-Palast ensemble and won the Hersfeld-Preis in 1996.

== Selected filmography ==
- Is Mausi Coming Out?, 1995
- Lieb mich!, 2000
- Just the Beginning, 2000
- Sumo Bruno, 2000, German comedy drama film, directed by Lenard Fritz Krawinkel
- Julie's Spirit, 2002, Focus Films, directed by Bettina Wilhelm and starring Sylvie Testud and Julia Richter
- Learning Her Secrets, 2003
- Raju, 2012, live action short film, directed by Max Zahle
