= Julia Haacke =

German actress and voice actress (born 1971)

Eva Susanne Julia Haacke (born 2 September 1971 in Munich) is a German actress and voice actress.

== Selected filmography ==
- 1994 Verfolger
- 1995 Nur über meine Leiche
- 1997 Verbotene Liebe (Kerstin Richter)
- 1997 Wildbach
- 2000 Lexx – The Dark Zone: Tales from a Parallel Universe
- 2000 Der schwarze Spiegel
- 2000 St. Angela: Horrornacht und Partyfieber
- 2001 Der blaue Vogel
- 2006 Sturm der Liebe
- 2011 Verbotene Liebe (Kerstin Richter)
- 2011 Princess Lillifee and the Little Unicorn

== Voice acting ==
Among other roles, Haacke dubbed Jennie Garth in Beverly Hills, 90210, Eliza Dushku in Bring it On and Izabella Miko in Coyote Ugly.

In anime, she played the German language roles of Rei Hino (Sailor Mars) in Sailor Moon, Kodachi in Ranma ½ and Shippō in InuYasha, One Piece (TV) as Miss Father's Day, Princess Sara as Lavinia, Miyuki as Miyuki Wakamatsu, and many others.
