= Paul Frielinghaus =

German television actor (born 1959)

Paul Erich Frielinghaus (born 14 December 1959 in Darmstadt, West Germany) is a German television actor. Since 2000 he plays a leading role on the German TV series Ein Fall für Zwei. He has played in several German TV series, e.g. Alarm für Cobra 11 – Die Autobahnpolizei.
