= Sabine Bohlmann =

German actress

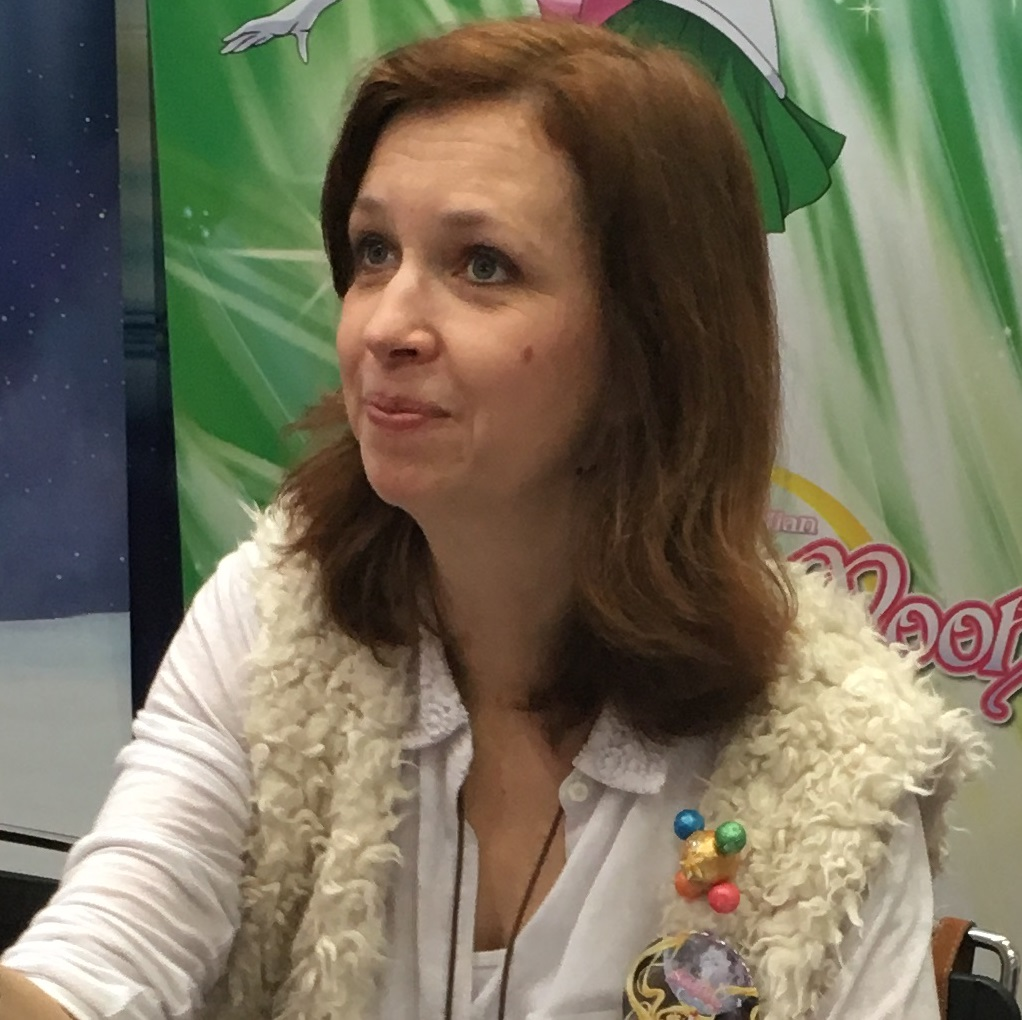
Sabine Bohlmann (2016)

Sabine Bohlmann (born 5 March 1969) is a German actress. She is the German voice of Lisa and Maggie Simpson on The Simpsons. She is most active in dubbing children's television. In the 1980s and 1990s, there was hardly any dubbed children's show, in which she was not to be heard at least as a "guest voice". Due to her very high and soft voice she is often used to dub young children and teenagers. Bohlmann also works as a writer, and has written over fifty children's books in German since 2015.

== Actress ==
- Mit Leib und Seele (with belly and soul) (1989)
- Vera Wesskamp (1992)
- Happy Holiday (1994)
- Hotel Mama – Die Rückkehr der Kinder (Hotel mom – The return of the children) (1997)
- Our Charly (Unser Charly) (1999)
- Marienhof (1992–1997, 2000–2004)

== German-language dubbing ==
=== Television series ===
- Doctor Who
  - as Stellar in Dragonfire
  - as The Girl in Remembrance of the Daleks
  - as Little Girl in The Greatest Show in the Galaxy
  - as Jean in The Curse of Fenric
  - as Squeak in Survival.

=== Animation series ===
- Lisa Simpson and Maggie Simpson in The Simpsons
- Baby Joe in Miss Moon
- Cubby in Disney's Adventures of the Gummi Bears
- Kenny McCormick, Ike Broflovski and Heidi Turner (season 9 - *) in South Park
- Ling-Ling in Drawn Together
- Honker Muddlefoot in Darkwing Duck
- Nova in Silver Surfer
- Rosie in Caillou
- Isabella in Phineas and Ferb

=== Anime series ===
- Sailor Moon (season 1 (replaced by Inez Günther)), Diana, Parapara, and other minor roles in Sailor Moon
- Pikachu (season 1) in Pokémon (replaced by the original-voice Ikue Ōtani)
- Lin-Lin and Lan-Lan in Ranma ½
- Cream the Rabbit in Sonic X
- Sailor Moon in Sailor Moon Crystal

=== Movies ===
- Angela Goethals in Home Alone and Home Alone 2: Lost in New York
- Shirley Henderson in Harry Potter and the Chamber of Secrets and Harry Potter and the Goblet of Fire as Mouning Myrtle (in German: "Maulende Myrthe")
- Vanessa Paradis in Un amour de sorcière and Un amour de sorcièr
- Kenny McCormick & Ike Broflovski in South Park: Bigger, Longer & Uncut (1999)
- Lisa & Maggie Simpson in The Simpsons Movie (2007)
- Princess Lillifee and the Little Unicorn (2011)
- Ash's Pikachu (speaking role only) in Pokémon the Movie: I Choose You! (2017)
- Sailor Moon in Sailor Moon Eternal (2021)
- Sailor Moon and Chibi-Chibi in Sailor Moon Cosmos (2024)
