= Mallorca – Suche nach dem Paradies =

- Genre: Soap opera
- Country of origin: Spain
- Original language: German
- No. of seasons: 1
- No. of episodes: 200

Production
- Executive producer: Wolf Bauer
- Producer: Sabine Eckhardt
- Production location: Mallorca
- Camera setup: Single-camera setup
- Running time: approx. 24 minutes
- Production company: Grundy UFA Baleares

Original release
- Network: ProSieben
- Release: April 26, 1999 – January 14, 2000

Mallorca – Suche nach dem Paradies (English: Mallorca - Search for the Paradise) or short named just Mallorca is a German television soap opera, produced by Grundy UFA on location in Spain. The show premiered on April 26, 1999 on ProSieben. Not a ratings success, rumors about a cancellation rose in the fall of the same year. Slowly Mallorca build a solid audience, but production costs were too high for the network and ProSieben canceled the show in the end of 1999. The last episode was shown in January 2000. The show continued on the channel's schedule through November 2000 in the daytime program, becoming a success in several reruns over the years.

== Storyline ==
The show follows a group of dropouts, who didn't see a future in Germany and now want to find happiness on the Spanish island Mallorca. Some are try to escape difficult relationships, others want to get away from their family or are running from the law. And some just searching for adventure and love.

The focus is put on the ruthless real estate agent Rolf Stein (Klaus Zmorek), whose business activities are not always legal. He lives together with his lover, the former stewardess Kim Ambach (Christine Döring), and his 19-year-old daughter Stefanie (Yvonne Burbach). Rolf also owns the Son Vent Hotel, which his good-hearted brother Volker (Matthias Haase) manages. He lives there together with his wife Christine (Jenny Jürgens), his 15-year-old daughter Carina (Luise Bähr) and his 16-year-old son Lukas (Vinzenz Kiefer). Then there is Rolf's secretary Carmen Diaz (Louise Wischermann) and the mechanic Ricardo Velázquez (Gaspar Cano), who lives together with his lover Eva Hansen (Wookie Mayer), his son Felipe (Kike Mas) and the Hotel employee Nicole Beck (Judith Rumpf) on an old Finca. Eva originally came with Rolf to Mallorca before falling for Ricardo.

Barkeeper Jan Keppler (Peter Atanassow) takes on three jobs, working at the Hotel, the Disco El Diagonal and the beach bar. The harbor also knows the name of Rolf Stein all too well. Here lies his yacht, named after his daughter, which is taken care of by the skippers Marc Osterkamp (Patrick Gräser) and Thomas Köhler (Alfonso Losa). Keeping her past in Germany hidden, Julia Breuer (Ulrike Frank) manages a little shop and finds support by her younger brother Andreas (Broder B. Hendrix). Julia works together with Maren Hoffmann, who lives under the alias of Lena Schilling. Maren and Lena met at the day of their arrival and later got into a car accident. Lena died and Maren was mistaken to be her.

== See also ==
- List of German television series
