= Wolfgang Bahro =

German actor

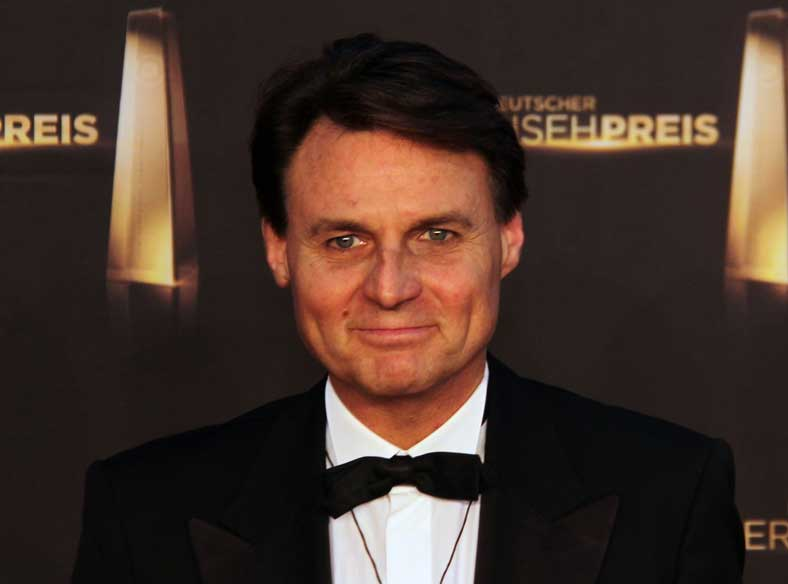
- Wolfgang Bahro at the Deutscher Fernsehpreis in 2012
- Born: 18 September 1960 (age 65); West Berlin, West Germany
- Occupation: Actor
- Years active: 1978–present
- Website: www.wolfgangbahro.de/index.html

Wolfgang Bahro (born 18 September 1960) is a German actor of television, stage, and film. He also works as a voice actor. Bahro has been best known for his role as Jo Gerner on the popular soap opera Gute Zeiten, schlechte Zeiten.

== Career ==
=== Early works ===
Bahro started his acting career at a young age. He debuted in the 1978 film Verführungen by Michael Verhoeven. Bahro finished school and started studying Psychology and Theater at the Free University of Berlin. However his passion for his acting work didn't get along with the busy schedule and Bahro quit college after six out of eight semesters. Instead he received a professional acting education at an acting school of Prof. Erika Dannhoff. In 1981, Bahro gave his stage debut in the play Der wahre Jakob. In 1988, he became part of the Didi-Show, a program by Dieter Hallervorden.

=== Gute Zeiten, schlechte Zeiten ===
In retrospective, Bahro admits that the early episodes of Gute Zeiten, schlechte Zeiten would be hard to look at in terms of quality. In late 1992 (aired in February 1993) he joined the show only months after its premiere and was mainly introduced to boost the ratings. The soap opera later became a pop-culture phenomenon with a serial killer storyline and a popular set of twenty-somethings. The soap opera reached its rating high with more than seven million viewers watching the explosion of Daniel's Bar in 2002. At this point, Bahro and his role as the egoistic, power-hungry attorney Jo Gerner became the identification of the show. Over the years, Gerner was compared to be the German J.R. Ewing. In the beginning, Bahro wasn't sure about joining the show and for how long he could do this. Later he became much more appreciative of the role and as said in a 2013 interview with the tabloid paper Bild, can't imagine to quit any time soon. Bahro also played the role of Jo Gerner as part of a crossover with fellow soap opera Alles was zählt in 2013.

=== Other works ===
Bahro has dubbed actor Tim Roth in Pulp Fiction and Captives and Steve Buscemi in Desperado and 28 Days. His voice is also heard in several radio plays.

== Television filmography ==
- Gute Zeiten, schlechte Zeiten as Prof. Dr. Hans-Joachim 'Jo' Gerner (3 February 1993 – present)
- Schloss Einstein as Musiker ARNO (4 episodes)
- SOKO 5113 as Dr. Florian Waltert (2 episodes, 2002)
