= Sandra Keller (actress) =

German actress (born 1973)

- Born: 10 August 1973 (age 52); Königs Wusterhausen, East Germany
- Occupation: Actress

Sandra Keller (born 10 August 1973 in Königs Wusterhausen) is a German actress, particularly known for her role as Tina Zimmermann, née Ullrich in the television series Gute Zeiten, schlechte Zeiten, which she played from 1992 to 1996. In April 1996, she was on the cover of the German edition of Playboy.

== Biography ==
Keller left school without completing a leaving certificate in order to act in the television series Gute Zeiten, schlechte Zeiten. After leaving the series in 1996, she has not had as much success as an actress. In 2005, she opened a boutique in Berlin.

== Filmography ==
- 1992–1996: Gute Zeiten, schlechte Zeiten
- 1997: Matadore
- 1997: Frauenarzt Dr. Markus Merthin
- 1998: Wolffs Revier
- 1998: Polizeiruf 110
- 1999: Der letzte Zeuge – Der Weg zur Hölle
- 1999: Die Strandclique
- 1999: Lexx – The Dark Zone
- 2000: SOS Barracuda – Die Tränen der Kleopatra
- 2000: Küstenwache
- 2000: Heimliche Küsse – Verliebt in ein Sex-Symbol
- 2000: Für alle Fälle Stefanie
- 2001: Ein Fall für zwei
- 2001: SOS Barracuda – Der Mädchenjäger
- 2001: SOS Barracuda – Der Hai von Mallorca
- 2001, 2002–2003: Marienhof
- 2002: Berlin, Berlin
- 2002: SOS Barracuda – Terror im Paradies
- 2002: Inspektor Rolle: Top oder Flop
- 2005: Sturm der Liebe
- 2007-2008: Die Anrheiner
- 2008: Anna und die Liebe
