= A Case for Two =

German television series

- The logo of the series
- Created by: Karl Heinz Willschrei
- Starring: Paul Frielinghaus; Claus Theo Gärtner; Günter Strack; Rainer Hunold; Mathias Herrmann; Renate Kohn; Caroline Grothgar
- Theme music composer: Klaus Doldinger
- Countries of origin: West Germany (1981–1990); Germany (1990–2013)
- Original language: German
- No. of seasons: 31
- No. of episodes: 300

Production
- Executive producers: Georg Althammer; Hans Joachim Mendig
- Running time: approx. 60 minutes

Original release
- Network: ZDF; TF1 (France); Rai Uno (Italy); TVP (Poland)
- Release: 11 September 1981 – 29 March 2013

A case for two (German: Ein Fall für zwei) is a German television series, which premiered on 11 September 1981 on ZDF. The series, set in Frankfurt, features two main characters who solve crimes: a defense attorney and a private investigator.

== Plot ==
Josef Matula (played by Claus Theo Gärtner), a former German police officer, has gone into private business. His method of investigation is very effective and direct, and he sometimes even resorts to dirty tricks. Claus Theo Gärtner portrayed the role until 2013. The series' original opening theme sequence showed the viewer that Matula had been fired from the police and tried or convicted. Dr. Renz has defended him and Matula is seen walking out of the jail accompanied by Renz. Before closing we see that Renz has hired Matula as a private detective.

In contrast, the attorney character has changed several times. The first attorney was Dr. Dieter Renz (played by Günter Strack). Dr. Renz retired in episode #60 and was replaced by Dr. Rainer Franck (played by Rainer Hunold). In episode #149, Dr. Franck took a job as a law school teacher, and was replaced by Dr. Johannes Voss (played by Mathias Herrmann). In episode #182, Dr. Voss was shot dead by an escaping criminal, and was in turn replaced by Dr. Markus Lessing (played by Paul Frielinghaus).

Most of the episodes follow a simple pattern. Someone is murdered, and the police arrest the most likely suspect. The suspect, claiming to be innocent, hires the attorney in the series (Renz, Franck, Voss or Lessing) as his lawyer. The attorney does all the paperwork, talks with the police and attends court. Meanwhile, Matula does all the actual research and detective work – "gets his hands dirty", so to speak. Matula often gets into fights, and even though he is in his early sixties, he often knocks out the bad guys. In the end, the original suspect usually (but not always) turns out to be innocent after all, and the real culprit is found.

In late 2006 through early 2007, most episodes included scenes of Matula visiting a strip club, to interrogate the owner or one of the customers, with very brief footage of topless female dancers. Very few, if any, other German detective shows feature similar scenes. Current episodes no longer show such scenes.

The show's structure is very similar to that of the American legal drama Perry Mason, though not many scenes in Ein Fall für zwei take place in a courtroom.

== Josef Matula ==
Josef Matula
- Ein Fall für Zwei; Matula character
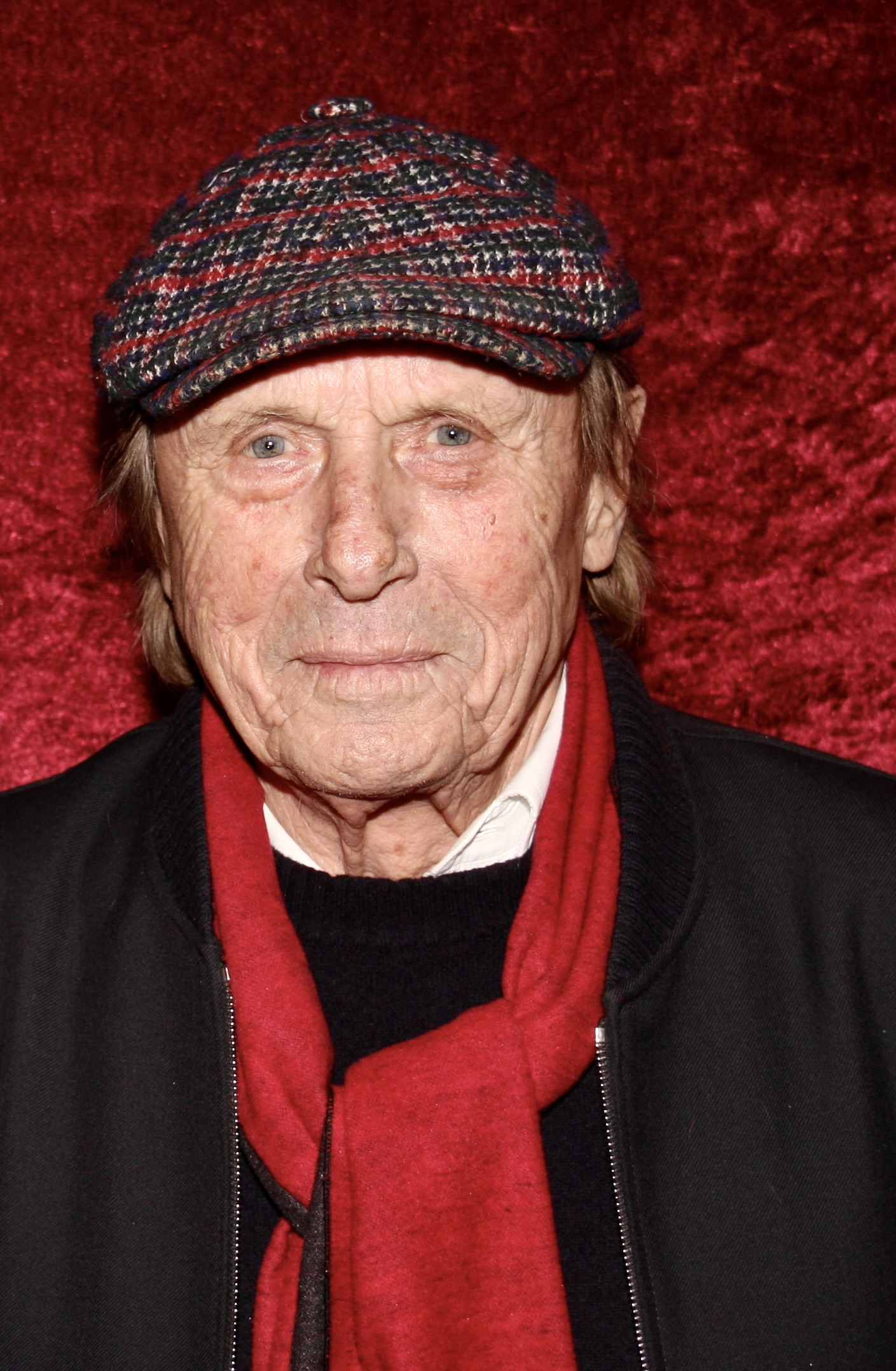
- Claus Theo Gärtner
- First appearance: Die große Schwester; 11 September 1981
- Last appearance: Letzte Worte; 29 March 2013
- Created by: Karl Heinz Willschrei
- Portrayed by: Claus Theo Gärtner

In-universe information
- Full name: Hermann Josef Matula
- Occupation: Private detective Former police officer
- Affiliation: Frankfurt police department
- Religion: Roman Catholic
- Origin: Oberhausen, Germany
- Nationality: German

Hermann Josef Matula (played by Claus Theo Gärtner) is one of the two main characters on the show, and the only character to have appeared in every episode so far. Matula is a former police officer who has become a private detective instead. He always works in co-operation with a defense attorney, who is the other main character on the show.

In the beginning of the first episode in 1981 he mentioned his birthplace to be Oberhausen and his age to be 31 years. So he was going to celebrate his 60th birthday in 2010. Despite this advanced age, Matula is in good physical condition and can put up quite a fight when challenged. According to research done by a German fan of the show, Matula has been beaten up 37 times and knocked unconscious 7 times. Still he somehow manages to stay healthy and fit for his duty.

Matula's method of detective work is very direct and hands-down. While the attorney he works with handles the juridistical part of the current case, Matula gets his hands dirty and tracks down the people he suspects of being involved in the crimes. This frequently involves him posing as a reporter or other similar profession to avoid discovery. Matula's direct, action-oriented way of work often gets him into trouble with the police. He has been arrested 12 times, and the entire plot of one episode centered on Matula being suspected of murder and having to escape the police into Austria.

Despite his toughness, Matula is a skilled cook and has a great deal of charm with women, but has never been married.

== Cast ==
In October 2011, Gärtner and Frielinghaus announced that they would be leaving the series after the 300th episode, which was aired on 29 March 2013.

The series was relaunched with new characters and actors in 2014. Antoine Monot Jr. has since been playing attorney Benjamin "Benni" Hornberg alongside Wanja Mues who portrays investigator Leo Oswald.
