= Alfred Müller (actor) =

German actor

- Born: 4 July 1926; Berlin -Wedding, Germany
- Died: 2 December 2010; Berlin, Germany
- Occupation(s): Stage actor screen performer television performer

Alfred Müller (4 July 1926 – 2 December 2010) was a German stage and screen actor. His career peaked in the German Democratic Republic during the 1960s and 1970s, but he was still making frequent appearances – increasingly, by this time, on the small screen – in film dramas through the 1980s. He was 63 when the wall came down and, unlike many performers who had built their careers in East Germany (1949–1989), he successfully transitioned in reunified Germany, continuing to appear in stage musicals and television dramas long after his seventieth birthday. As a result of his starring role in the 1963 East German espionage film For Eyes Only he was burdened, over many decades, with the labels, the "James Bond of the East" and "007 of the East": he detested the epithets.

== Life ==
=== Provenance and early years ===
Alfred Müller was born and grew up in the Wedding district of central Berlin. His father worked sometimes as a casual labourer and sometimes as a taxi driver: his mother worked as a secretary. Müller attended school in the adjacent Berlin district of Humboldthain. Long before completing his schooling he had become determined to make a career as an actor, "preferably in comedy or musicals". That was partly down to his father, who in the years of economic collapse that followed the Wall Street crash of 1929 had, like many others, experienced lengthy periods of unemployment. Müller later explained to an interviewer that his father had spent many afternoons that would otherwise have been idle at the "daytime cinema" and variety shows, accompanied by young Albert "from the moment he was able to sit up straight". On returning home the child would re-enact the show he had just witnessed in front of a mirror. By the time he left school Germany was at war. When he was sixteen he attended a Needlework School, "the only 'man' surrounded by noisy girls".

There was no money for stage school, and the needlework training was evidently never a fulltime commitment, since between 1940 and 1943 he was also enrolled as an apprentice mechanic at a Berlin Siemens plant. While working at Siemens he teamed up with likeminded friends and work-colleagues to form a factory cabaret troupe. In 1943, his apprenticeship completed under an accelerated war-time procedure, he was conscripted for military service. Quite soon he found himself a prisoner of war in France.

=== Post-war career building ===
He was able to return home only in 1949. Since May 1945 the remaining western two-thirds of Germany had been divided into four military occupation zones, with separate special arrangements for Bremen (which was strategically important) and for the (former and future) German capital, Berlin. Berlin was separately divided into occupation sectors, administered respectively by the British, U.S., French and Soviet military. Berlin Wedding, where Müller had grown up, was now administered as part of the French sector, but the entire eastern part of the city, where he later made his home, was administered as part of the Soviet occupation zone, relaunched in October 1949 as the Soviet sponsored German Democratic Republic (East Germany). East Berlin, as the city's Soviet sector was coming to be known, had been home to the "Deutsche Film-Aktiengesellschaft" (DEFA), the first film production company in post-war Germany, since 1946. Müller, still pursuing his dream of a career as an actor, applied to the DEFA for a training, which would have been provided at no cost if his application had been accepted. It was rejected, however. Undaunted, he applied to study music at the "Konservatorium des Nordens", a music conservatory in the western part of the city, becoming a proficient guitarist. He teamed up with friends to provide impromptu music entertainment in Berlin bars and restaurants. The administrative border dividing East Berlin from West Berlin was still not marked by any effective physical barrier, and he was able to combine his music training in "the west" with theatre work at Prenzlauer Berg in "the east", where he appeared as a member of an amateur drama group and of a cabaret group.

In 1952, by now aged 26, having tried again to gain acceptance for a training in acting, Alfred Müller was accepted at the recently opened "Berlin Stage School" ("Berliner Schauspielschule" – as it was known at that time) where he studied for three years between 1952 and 1955.

=== Lift off ===
In 1955, despite the difficulties in obtaining the necessary training and qualification, Alfred Müller's career took off from the outset. He later told an interviewer: "I had, at the start of my career, a lot of luck" (Note: "Ich hatte am Anfang meiner Karriere viel Glück".) Between 1955 and 1959 he worked at the "Stadttheater" (as the "Civic Theatre" was known at that time) in Senftenberg. (Note: Some sources state that between 1955 and 1959 he worked in the "Theater der Bergarbeiter" (" Mine Workers' Theatre") in Senftenberg; but that is, strictly speaking anachronistic, since the "Stadttheater..." was only renamed as the "Theater der Bergarbeiter" on 7 July 1959. (It was renamed again in 1990.)) Here his debut performance was as Faust in "Urfaust", as the earlier version of Goethe's "Faust" is known in the German-language. Elsewhere it is stated that Müller's debut performance at Senftenberg was as "Muley Hassan" in Schiller's Fiesco's Conspiracy at Genoa. Sources differ as to which was the earlier performance, but there is agreement that during nearly four years at the "Stadttheater Senftenberg" Alfred Müller was able to hone his craft through playing a broad selection of roles from the German theatre classics, ancient and modern, including lead characters in Brecht's "Puntila" and "Theodor Maske" in Carl Sternheim's Die Hose ("The Trousers").

It was during his time at Senftenberg that Alfred Müller met the costume designer Eva Drechsler, originally from Usedom in the north. They married in 1958. The couple's son was born in 1967.

=== Maxim Gorki Theater ===
Someone else to whom Müller became increasingly close during his Senftenberg years was the theatre director Horst Schönemann. In 1959 Schönemann switched to the Maxim Gorki Theater in East Berlin. Müller went too: it was a welcome opportunity to return to his home city. Alfred Müller was based at the Gorki Theatre in East Berlin between 1959 and 1965, and then again between 1972 and 1984. In the words of the commentator Ehrentraud Novotný, this versatile and expressive actor achieved his greatest successes at the Gorki Theatre in "roles of sophisticated comedy with a serious background". (Note: " ... Rollen von feiner Komik mit ernstem Hintergrund.") He achieved critical acclaim with his 1961 appearance in The Broken Jug by Heinrich von Kleist. Commentators were also impressed by his characterisation of Phileas Fogg in a 1962 production of Pavel Kohout's comedic stage drama adaptation of Jules Verne's adventure-novel Around the World in Eighty Days. Müller succeeded in communicating to audiences with irony and intelligence the authoritative calm and engrained snobbism present in Verne's vision of the classic "British Gentleman" of Victorian England. In the same mould, critics also pick out for praise his performance as Colonel Pickering in a theatre production of My Fair Lady.

It seems to have been around this time, during the early 1960s, that Alfred Müller finally joined the party. In 1964 he was a recipient of the Art Prize of the German Democratic Republic, the Patriotic Order of Merit and the Arts Prize of the FDGB (Trade Union Federation).

=== James Bond of the East ===
Moving back to Berlin and, in particular, becoming a regular stage-presence at the Gorki Theater clearly raised Alfred Müller's profile, both with the party and with theatre audiences more broadly. East Berlin was also home to the DEFA film studios. Alfred Müller was interested in the movie business, and even had his own cine-camera, though he seems to have used it only for home-movies. He was nevertheless able to find time to appear in film productions for public distribution starting, in 1959/60, with a very minor role in Flucht aus der Hölle ("Flight out of Hell"), a four-part film drama for television. A succession of further minor film roles followed.

He found overnight screen success with his appearance as "Agent Hans" in the 1963 political thriller "For Eyes Only". The film director, János Veiczi, already had a record of proven success with East German audiences with productions in the well-proven "adventure film" genre. "For Eyes Only" is the story of an East German intelligence agent who successfully penetrates the CIA at a high level. He manages to steal from the CIA headquarters a critical plan for a military attack against East Germany, and then to return home successfully. Alfred Müller and screenwriter Harry Thürk present "Agent Hans" as understated character, reassuringly free if heroic pretensions: he is lovable, clever and brave. The character is convincing also because of the way in which Müller makes him appear "normal". The agent manages to succeed as a master spy without the need to resort to any of the "classic espionage clichés". "For Eyes Only" was hugely popular. More than nine million East Germans are reported to have seen the film in a cinema: if none had seen it more than once, that would indicate that roughly 50% of the population attended a cinema screening of it. The role established Alfred Müller's enduring popularity as a film star. Described by admirers as reticent and modest by nature, he seems never to have been much bothered over his popularity: "With a name like Müller, you have to be good for something" (Note: "Wer Müller heißt, muss was können". (In much of the German-speaking world, the name "Müller" fulfils much the same role as "Smith" in England, "Jones" in Wales and "Johnson" in the United States: it is an exceptionally common/popular surname / family name.)) Modest or not, success in "For Eyes Only" turned out to be the first in a series of leading film roles in which he played a succession of "everyman" characters, skilfully and flexibly combining the cheerful with the serious, and dealing both with contemporary and with historical themes.

=== Little Rabbit ===
The next film in which he starred was "Das Kaninchen bin ich" ("The Little Rabbit, that's me"), filmed during 1965 and directed by Kurt Maetzig. The lead role was taken by Angelika Waller, appearing in the first lead role of her career as Maria Morzeck, a nineteen year old whose ambition to study at university is destroyed after her brother is imprisoned for three years following a conviction for "staatsgefährdender Hetze" ("activism endangering the state"). Instead she becomes a waitress. She meets and falls in love with a much older man called Paul Deister. Deister, it transpires, is a married man and a respected judge. He is, indeed, the judge who convicted and sentenced Maria's brother. Much of the second part of the film deals with the exposure of Deister's corruption and hypocrisy. The part of Paul Deister was played by Alfred Müller.

The film was a product of the so-called Khrushchev Thaw, a period of very cautious liberalisation emanating from Moscow during the early 1960s. First Secretary Khrushchev's De-Stalinization programme included some relaxation in repression and censorship in the Soviet Union along with the release of hundreds of thousands of political prisoners. Inevitably these winds of change from the Kremlin found their echoes in East Germany, whether the party leadership liked it or not. The production of Das Kaninchen bin ich was part of a phase of liberalisation in East Germany so cautious that it went largely unremarked in the west. After First Secretary Khrushchev fell from power at the end of 1964 there followed a period of several months during which the future direction of travel in respect of the political and social liberalisation or repression was impossible to determine, both with respect to Moscow, where Khrushchev's departure was followed by a power struggle between Alexei Kosygin and Leonid Brezhnev. and in East Berlin. By the end of 1965 the direction of travel was becoming clearer, however, and Das Kaninchen bin ich, which had been scheduled for release early the following year, was one of twelve cinematic productions that was deemed "politically damaging" by the Party Central Committee and, in December 1965, banned. (Note: There is inconsistency between sources as to when the film was banned. However, the Eleventh plenum meeting of the Party Central Committee at which the decision to ban it was taken and minuted took place between 16 and 18 December 1965.) It was only in 1990, as the East German dictatorship collapsed that Das Kaninchen bin ich was distributed to cinemas.

=== DEFA ===
Faced with a succession of tempting film roles, in 1965 Müller left the Gorki Theater and, for the next seven years, focused film work, as a permanent member of the "DEFA [film studios] ensemble". Along with his starring role in Das Kaninchen bin ich, he appeared in a supporting role as the "capitalist armaments baron", Gustav Krupp in As long as there's life in me ("Solange Leben in mir ist"), an uncontroversial film (from the party's perspective) about the heroic communist leader, Karl Liebknecht. At around the same time, television producers began to take more notice of him and the offers he received therefore came both for cinema productions and small screen films. In the multi-part biographical TV mini-series "Ohne Kampf kein Sieg" ("No victory without a fight"), released in 1966, he co-starred as the aerobatics ace Ernst Udet. With the two-part film Frozen Lightning Flashed ("Die gefrorenen Blitze" / "Et l'Angleterre sera détruite"), released in 1967 and concerned with war-time antifascist resistance, he returned to working with screenwriter Harry Thürk and film director János Veiczi. In a thoughtful performance, he heads up the cast-list as the rocket scientist Dr. Grunwald, who confronts a series of moral dilemmas through his involvement in rocket-bomb development at Peenemünde. Another of his historical film roles to warm the hearts of Central Committee members was as Karl Marx in the 1969 children's film Mohr and the Ravens of London ("Mohr und die Raben von London"). The focus of the film is on an episode in Marx's life in which he campaigns against child labour. Müller's sympathetic portrayal of the great totem of Soviet-style Communism earned him the National Prize of the German Democratic Republic in 1969 and an intensifying deluge of tempting offers of work from television drama departments. In 1969, again teaming up with screenwriter Harry Thürk and film director János Veiczi, he consolidating his reputation for portraying Homeland Security officers with elements of humanity, taking the starring role of "Major Wendt" in the eleven-part television drama Meeting with the unknown ("Rendezvous mit unbekannt").

The many other films in which Müller featured during his DEFA years include Kurt Maetzig's production of Banner of Krivoi Rog"("Die Fahne von Kriwoj Rog", 1967), Herrmann Zschoche's screen comedy Life in pairs ("Leben zu zweit", 1968) and Roland Gräf's film for young people, My Dear Robinson ("Mein lieber Robinson", 1970).

=== Maxim Gorki Theater again ===
In 1972 Alfred Müller left the "DEFA ensemble" and returned to the Gorki Theater. He had missed the stage and the concomitant direct contact with audiences. His second period as a member of the Gorki Theatre Company lasted until 1984/85. Stage roles included "Käpt'n Ritter" in a stage version of Seemannsliebe by Freitag and Nestler, Sudakow in Rozov's Das Nest des Auerhahns (1981/82) and Adolf Hitler in Shatrov Das Ende. His stage roles no doubt pleased contemporary theater audiences and the authorities at the time. However, due the transitory nature of the medium, along with the facts that the many plays in which he appeared were those by politically acceptable Soviet dramatists and that East Germany remained culturally isolated from the west through from the 1950s until the end of the 1980s, and except within the confines of "Ostalgie", sources created post-reunification, many of which were published only in 2010, to mark Müller's death, tend to overlook those theatre performances. Throughout his time at the Gorky Theater he also continued to appear through the 1970s and 1980s – frequently in leading roles – in film dramas, though the films in which he appeared, and for which he is posthumously celebrated, were increasingly those intended for television rather than for cinema.

=== Celebrity performer of stage and screen during the final decade of the GDR ===
Alfred Müller's had always been drawn most strongly towards comedy and musical dramas. Despite his remarkable versatility as an actor, by 1972 (if not earlier) he was in a position to choose only from those roles that most appealed to him. At least one commentator bemoans the way in which, even during his seven years as a full-time member of their "ensemble", the "DEFA" film studios (Note: There was very little by way of "alternative cinema" – outside the government directed "DEFA" studios – in the German Democratic Republic before 1989/90.) had made so little use of his comic talent, and there are indications that this may be one of a number of explanations for his increasing focus on television during the 1980s.

In the 1978 film musical-comedy "Hiev up" Müller stars as "Captain Odje", master of a sailing cutter on which he attempts to impose order on an unruly ship's crew. "Hiev up" was a co-production between the DEFA and DFF, the national television provider. A comedy role recalled with particular affection was that of Alois Wachtel, the local postman with a preference for communicating by mumbling in barely comprehensible regional dialect, in the highly popular six-part annual television series Ferienheim Bergkristall ("Bergkristall Holiday Home"). A single 80 or 90-minute episode was transmitted annually, each December between 1983 and 1987. (The final episode appeared only in December 1989, deferred for a year on account of the illness of co-star Hans-Joachim Preil.) The postman Alois Wachtel broke out beyond the confines of Ferienheim Bergkristall, featuring in comedy sketches on other television shows, performed by Müller with his Ferienheim Bergkristall co-star Hans-Joachim Preil. Another television performance which has become something of a cult classic with German audiences and commentators was the so-called "judge sketch" performed in a double-act with Helga Hahnemann, first seen in an episode of the long-running television variety show on Saturday evenings, and re-transmitted frequently ever since. Much of the comedic effect is based on the judge's loss of his gavel, a theme which both players milk at considerable length, and to great effect. He also teamed up with Helga Hahnemann for live shows, notably in a number of reviews at Berlin's "Palast" review theatre.

Müller also continued to appear in productions that were neither comedies nor musicals. In 1989, aged 63, he starred in the seven-part television series "Die gläserne Fackel" (loosely, "the glass-maker's torch"). It would be one of his final lead roles. The production was directed by Joachim Kunert, who also co-wrote the script with Wolfgang Held, the author of the bio-novel on which the television series was based. The film version has stood the test of time very much better than the book. Alfred Müller took the part of the optics pioneer and entrepreneur, Carl Zeiss in a television drama which most recently reappeared on a nationally received German television channels in 2016.

According to one source, by the end of his career Alfred Müller had played over 100 roles. Beyond the world of acting, he also worked during the 1980s as presenter-moderator on the East German television game show "Quizmühle".

=== Later years ===
After the collapse of the East German dictatorship and the reunification that followed, Müller continued to pursue his acting career through what might have been considered his old age. When it came to stage roles, his appearances were for the most part restricted to the so-called "Neue Bundesländer" (formerly East Germany), since he was little known to western audiences, and for at least ten years there was little appetite in the west for re-runs of old East German television variety shows. There were various guest stage appearances in Dessau, Dresden and also (in the west) Hagen. In Berlin he was on stage at the Kurfürstendamm variety theatre and at the Theater des Westens. His stage appearances, by this time, tended to be restricted to variety shows, for which he sometimes teamed up with surviving long-term stage partners from the past such as Gisela May or Solveig Müller (no relation). Musical stage shows in which he appeared in supporting roles during the 1990s included the 1994 review "Blue Jeans" and Berlin revivals of "Anything Goes" and "Hello, Dolly!".

One cultural icon of East German television that survived the changes of 1989/90 was the television crime drama series Polizeiruf 110. Alfred Müller took supporting roles in several episodes, notably in 1991, 1994 and 1997. Although he would continue taking minor roles in television dramas through the 1990s and (with less frequency) during the first decade of the twenty-first century he was by this stage generally content to leave the major roles to others. An exception was the television series Sherlock Holmes and the seven dwarves ("Sherlock Holmes und die sieben Zwerge"). Intended to appeal to children and their parents, the eight episodes were first screened across Germany during May and June 1992 during Sunday afternoons, but more recently screenings usually feature all eight episodes, cut together into a single 90-minute film. Alfred Müller took the lead, as Criminal Commissioner Hans Holms whose longed-for retirement has to be deferred, to participate in a somewhat fanciful narrative that starts with a visit from Fairyland of seven dwarves, invoking his help through a series of adventures triggered by the kidnapping of Snow White. Fortunately the armchair that his police colleagues had given him as a retirement present turns out to be a well-disguised secret portal into Fairyland.) The series, directed by Günter Meyer was the swan song of the old East German DEFA film studios at Babelsberg, the assets of which were sold to a French conglomerate in August 1992.

While he was alive, Alfred Müller liked to visit the North Sea island of Usedom when his schedule permitted it. Usedom was where his wife Eva had been born and grown up. The couple had acquired a holiday home there. After his wife died, he spent more time there, living with his long-standing stage-partner, the actress-musician Solveig Müller (no relation).

Alfred Müller died of Pancreatic cancer in Berlin on 2 December 2010. His partner Solveig Müller was with him when he died.

His body was disposed of in the Baltic Sea off the coast of Usedom in accordance with his wishes.
