= Stars (film) =

1959 film

- Directed by: Konrad Wolf
- Written by: Angel Vagenshtain
- Starring: Sasha Krusharska; Jürgen Frohriep
- Release dates: 23 March 1959 (Bulgaria); 27 March 1959 (East Germany)
- Running time: 92 minutes
- Countries: East Germany; Bulgaria
- Languages: German; Bulgarian; Ladino

Stars (German: Sterne) is a 1959 film directed by Konrad Wolf. It tells the story of a Wehrmacht sergeant who falls in love with a Greek Jewish girl while overseeing Jewish prisoners in Bulgaria prior to their transfer to a concentration camp. The film won the Special Jury Prize at the 1959 Cannes Film Festival.

== Plot ==
In a small Bulgarian town in 1943: A non-commissioned Wehrmacht officer by the name of Walter is tasked with supervising the civilian workers in a motor vehicle workshop, yet the former painter much prefers to just sit back and draw the area and people of the town. Walter's supervisor mockingly calls him "Rembrandt," but his best friend, Lieutenant Kurt, is proud to have a portrait done by him. Walter, especially, seems to enjoy being away from the war.

One day, Greek Sephardic Jews reach the small town, where they are kept as prisoners in a nearby concentration camp until they can be transported to Auschwitz. Through the barbed wire fence, Ruth, a Jewish woman, asks Walter for help with a woman giving birth. As Walter disinterestedly refuses, Ruth calls him a wolf and a rat, full of contempt. A little later, Walter appears again in the camp with a doctor, who was able to help the exhausted woman bring a child into the world. In the evening, Walter finds it difficult to sleep, and wanders around the village. He sees that the motor vehicle shop has been broken into, where he finds the lighter of a Bulgarian man named Bai Petko, but he chooses not to tell on the man.

The next day, the partisan soldiers secretly arrive at Petko’s home. This “doctor,” who treats the partisan soldiers in the woods, needs medication, which Petko in turn hopes to get by bribing Walter. He tells him that the medicine is for the Jews in the camp, so Walter smuggles a package of medicine to Blashe, one of Petko’s errand boys.

Walter is in a pub with Kurt in the evening. While Kurt had found some Bulgarian women, Walter had a woman from the concentration camp come—Ruth. Walter and Ruth, followed by a guard, walked the night streets of the small town, and slowly got to know each other. After Walter leaves Ruth at the camp gate, he wonders to himself what one can do.

The next day, Walter learns that Blashe had been caught by the Bulgarian police with the medicine. Blashe and Walter do not tell on each other, but Kurt has the Jews of the camp searched for medicine and punishes them when he finds parts of the stolen goods with them. Walter realizes that by trying to do good he did not accomplish any good. He turns to Petko, who lied to him about using the medicine. Petko in turn suspects Walter of telling on Blashe to the police, but Walter gives Petko back his lighter, proving he was on Petko’s side the whole time. In the evening, Walter meets with Ruth again, who was brought to him on Kurt’s initiative. Walter implores her to escape, but Ruth initially refuses. It is only at the end of a long conversation that Ruth finally agrees to flee the next night. Yet back in the camp, she is described by the other prisoners as a spy, and she breaks down crying in her father’s arms; after all, she had done nothing wrong.

Walter asks Kurt the next day when the Jews are supposed to be deported, and Kurt replies, “Tomorrow.” Kurt senses that Walter has fallen in love with Ruth, especially because he finds a portrait of Ruth in Walter’s drawing pad. Walter uses the day in order to organize an escape for Ruth through Petko. Petko also confesses to him that the partisan soldiers actually wanted to steal weapons when they broke into the motor vehicle workshop. When the escape plan is finally in place, Walter wants to use a ruse to get Ruth out of the camp, but the Jews have already been deported by that time. He runs to the train platform but can only see the departing cattle cars with Ruth inside. In his room, Walter finds the portrait of Ruth, on which Kurt has written that he lied about the departure time for Walter’s own good. Walter joins Petko, and they both begin to work out how to supply the partisan soldiers with weapons. The final shot shows Ruth in the cattle car, as the song “It Burns (Es brennt)” plays.

== Cast ==
- Sasha Krusharska - Ruth
- Jürgen Frohriep - Walter
- Erik S. Klein - Kurt
- Stefan Pejchev - Bai Petko
- Georgi Naumov - Blashe
- Ivan Kondov - Ruth's Father
- Milka Tuykova - The Female Partisan
- Shtilyan Kunev - The Doctor
- Naicho Petrov - The Police Chief
- Elena Hranova - The Old Jewess
- Leo Conforti - The Nervous Jew
- Grigor Vachkov - A Fitter at the Workshop
- Yuriy Yakovlev - A German Officer
- Itzhak Finzi - A Greek Jew
- Hannjo Hasse - German Officer

== Production ==
Angel Wagenstein, the screenwriter, used his own experiences in the script. The character Blashe is based on him.

Originally, Kurt Maetzig was intended to be the director. However, he was against it, having already made Jewish fates in Marriage in the Shadows (Ehe im Schatten) and Girls in Gingham (Die Buntkarieten) and not wanting to be tied down to the same theme. Angel Wagenstein then suggested Konrad Wolf as a director, whom he knew from their joint studies together in Moscow.

For the role of Ruth, the Israeli actress Haya Harareet was cast. However, she withdrew her commitment when she received an invitation from Hollywood. Tatiana Samoilova, who was intended to be a replacement per Konrad Wolf’s suggestion, was not available for health reasons. The beginning of the filming was getting closer and closer, and there was still no lead actress found. Bulgarian director Rangel Valchanov suggested his wife, Sascha Kruscharska, who was still studying then. With this role, she became a star.

The film was shot in the late summer of 1958 in the surrounding area of Sofia, Bulgaria. It premiered soon after on March 27, 1959, at the Haus der Berliner and Babylon Cinema in Berlin.

Initially, the film was not allowed to be shown in Bulgarian due to its abstract humanism, especially because it did not distinguish between the Jewish bourgeoisie and the Jewish proletariat. After the film won the special prize at the Cannes Film Festival, it was finally shown in Bulgaria, without any of the accusations being revoked. The film was also not allowed to be shown in the Soviet Union and Israel.

On June 3, 1960, an edited version of the film was released in cinemas of the FRG. In this version, the final part, in which Walter and Petko agree on supplying the partisan soldiers with weapons, was missing.

The film begins with the evacuation of the Jews and Walter’s attempt to reach the moving cars. A narrator, who apparently lived in the village at the time, looks back on that past and explains that the sergeant was never known by name to the inhabitants, so he calls him Walter for the sake of simplicity. The narrator also cuts in at the end of the film.

The film features the Yiddish songs “It Burns” (Es brennt) by Mordechaj Gebirtig and the folk song “Eli Eli,” sung by Gerry Wolff in German. The actors of the film speak in their own local language, so Bulgarian and Ladino dialogues are subtitled.

Konrad Wolf broke new ground in the film’s visual language, which was recognized by critics. In 1960, Film-Dienst praised the director for his visual language:

“Director Wolf can see cinematically, knows how to insert cunning montages and use the possibilities of internal monologues, set bold contrasts and apply close-up shots in the right place. He paints the forbidden love of the two characters in long shots on which people wander about as if lost in the endless night, and there are perspectives, tracking shots, dissolves, lighting effects, and other formal elements used to translate this soul-deep situation into the film-optical with dramaturgical necessity and without externalization.” ~ Film-Dienst, 1960

Frank Stern found in retrospect that the film “had a virtually revolutionary visual language for 1959. The cinematography, sound and image, dialogue, and performance go hand in hand with historical accuracy from research and precise knowledge.”

== Reception ==
Stars, whose title alludes to the Jewish stars, is based on real events. “For the first time in German cinema, the responsibility Germans had in the mass murder of the Jews were brought to light [in the film].” Critics of the FRG were quite mixed in their reviews:

“Some say that for such a righteous and pure film to come from the Soviet DEFA is a shame. I know a greater shame: Our free film production has not managed to have an adequate discussion of the painful discussion we are dealing with here.” ~ Günther Geisler, 1960

“[The] first important and significant thing I saw [from the DEFA] that excited me tremendously: “Please show me the West German film of similar color and quality,” says Klaus Wischnewski, chief editor of the DEFA Studio for Feature Films.

For Karl-Eduard von Schnitzler, the film helped “to bring complete knowledge of what had happened [in the persecution of the Jews] and its corrupt nature,” and thus cause “a complete overcoming [of hostility towards Jews] in the innermost depths.” In 1960, Film-Dienst also wrote that Stars “is one of those rare works [that] one would like to think could make people better.” In 1977, Dieter Krusche called Stars “a moving and honest examination of the past that is particularly captivating in its portrayal of the characters.” According to Frank Stern’s assessment, made in 2002, the film’s imagery made it possible to create “a historical legitimacy in the discussion of the Holocaust; the policy of extermination became more conceivable, more explainable, than textbooks, with their often exaggerated economic justification of fascism, were able to do.”

The Film-Dienst wrote: “A film full of poetry, emotion, and human attitude, with an outstanding performance by Sascha Kruscharka. DEFA director Konrad Wolf (1925-1982) created one of the most impressive films of GDR cinema with this visually fascinating drama.”

For cinema, the film was a “startling masterpiece.”

The film was released in 72 countries, including the U.S. in 1975.

== Awards ==
Since the GDR was not invited to the Cannes International Film Festival because it did not maintain diplomatic relations with France, Stars was sent as a Bulgarian film to compete for the Palme d’Or (Golden Palm) award. The film was eventually awarded the Jury Prize. Der Spiegel, a popular news magazine from Hamburg, then wrote: “It seems [...] certain that the interests of DEFA were more strongly represented during the decisive jury deliberations than those of the West German film industry,” and described Stars as “a concealed GDR film” with which DEFA had “smuggled” itself into the competition and won through “the lobbyists… of the Eastern Bloc countries” on the jury.

In 1959, Stars was awarded a gold medal at the World Fiesta in Vienna and received a certificate of recognition in Edinburgh. Konrad Wolf and Werner Bergmann were awarded the National Prize of the GDR.

Film historians and journalists in the Association of German Cinematheques voted Stars one of 100 most important German films of all time in 1995.
