= Jaecki Schwarz =

German actor (born 1946)

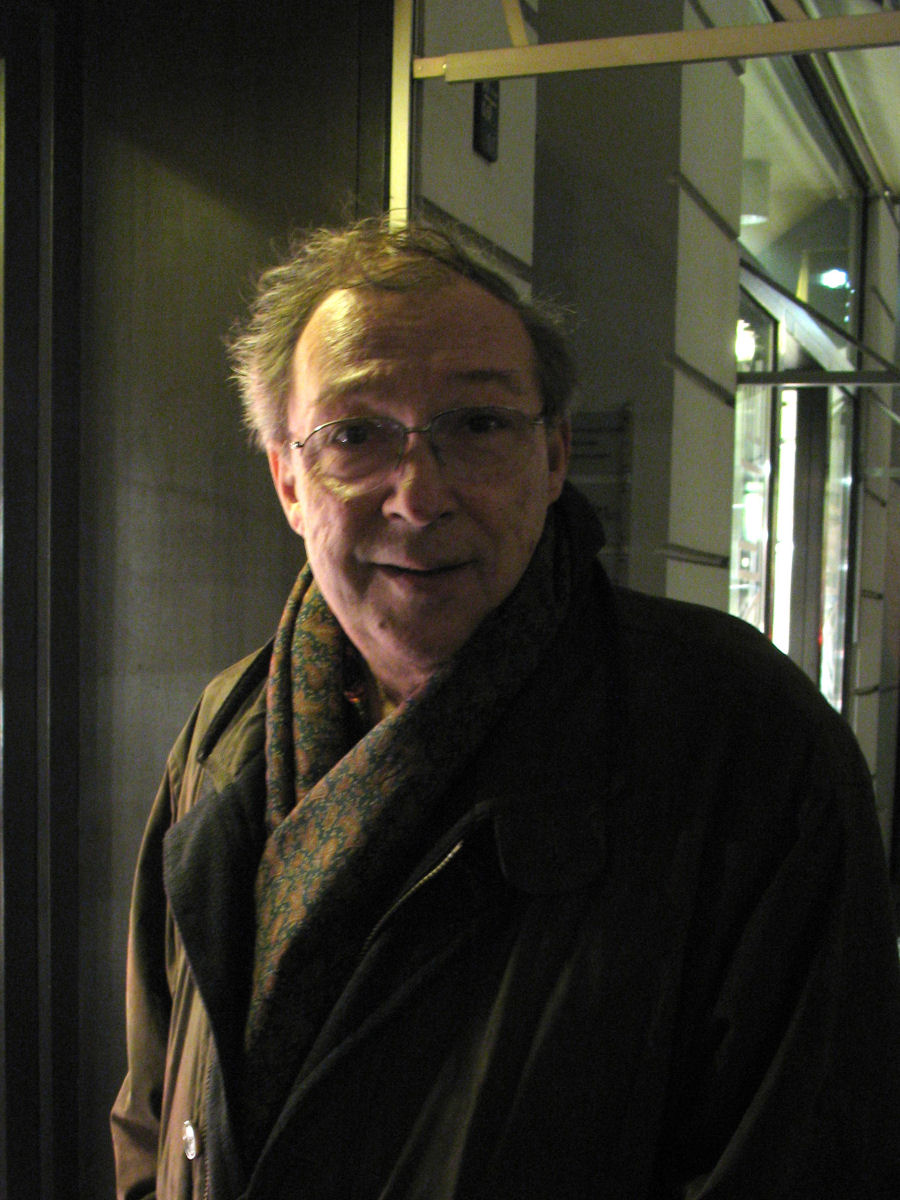
- Schwarz in 2009
- Born: 26 February 1946 (age 80); Berlin, Germany
- Occupation: Actor
- Years active: 1967–present
- Known for: Polizeiruf 110; Ein starkes Team
- Partner: Hagen Henning (1986–2006)

Jaecki Schwarz (born 26 February 1946) is a German actor. With around 120 film and television roles throughout his career, he worked prolifically with DEFA, the East German state-owned film studio, as well as Deutscher Fernsehfunk (DFF), the state television broadcaster in the GDR. Since the reunification of Germany, he has been known for his roles in the long-running detective television series Polizeiruf 110 as well as the crime series Ein starkes Team.

== Life ==
Schwarz was born in the Köpenick district of Berlin. He owes his name to his grandmother, who was a fan of the silent film child star Jackie Coogan. Since the American spelling "Jackie" was not permitted at the registry office, his name was entered as "Jaecki".

Schwarz played in school performances and was in the youth club of the German Theatre in Berlin. During his studies at the Alexander von Humboldt High School in Berlin, he completed an apprenticeship as a photochemical specialist. Subsequently, he applied twice at different acting schools, but was rejected both times. On his third attempt, he was accepted and studied at the German Academy of Film Art in Babelsberg from 1965 until 1969.

== Career ==
=== Theatre ===
In 1969, Schwarz made his acting debut in Magdeburg with the stage version of Hermann Kant's Die Aula. This was followed by numerous other roles, also in Magdeburg. From 1974 to 1997, he was a member of the Berliner Ensemble. Schwarz worked with various directors including Christoph Schroth, Fritz Marquardt, Manfred Wekwerth, and Peter Zadek. In 1996, he performed at the Maxim Gorki Theater in Carl Zuckmayer's The Captain of Koepenick.

=== Film and television ===
East Germany

In 1968, Schwarz starred in Konrad Wolf's autobiographical film I Was Nineteen while still a student. Between 1969 and 1989, he appeared in numerous DEFA and DFF film and television productions, including several fantasy and fairy tale adaptations. He also began appearing in television shows which would later define his career, such as the detective series Polizeiruf 110, where he would obtain a recurring role in 1996.

Post-unification

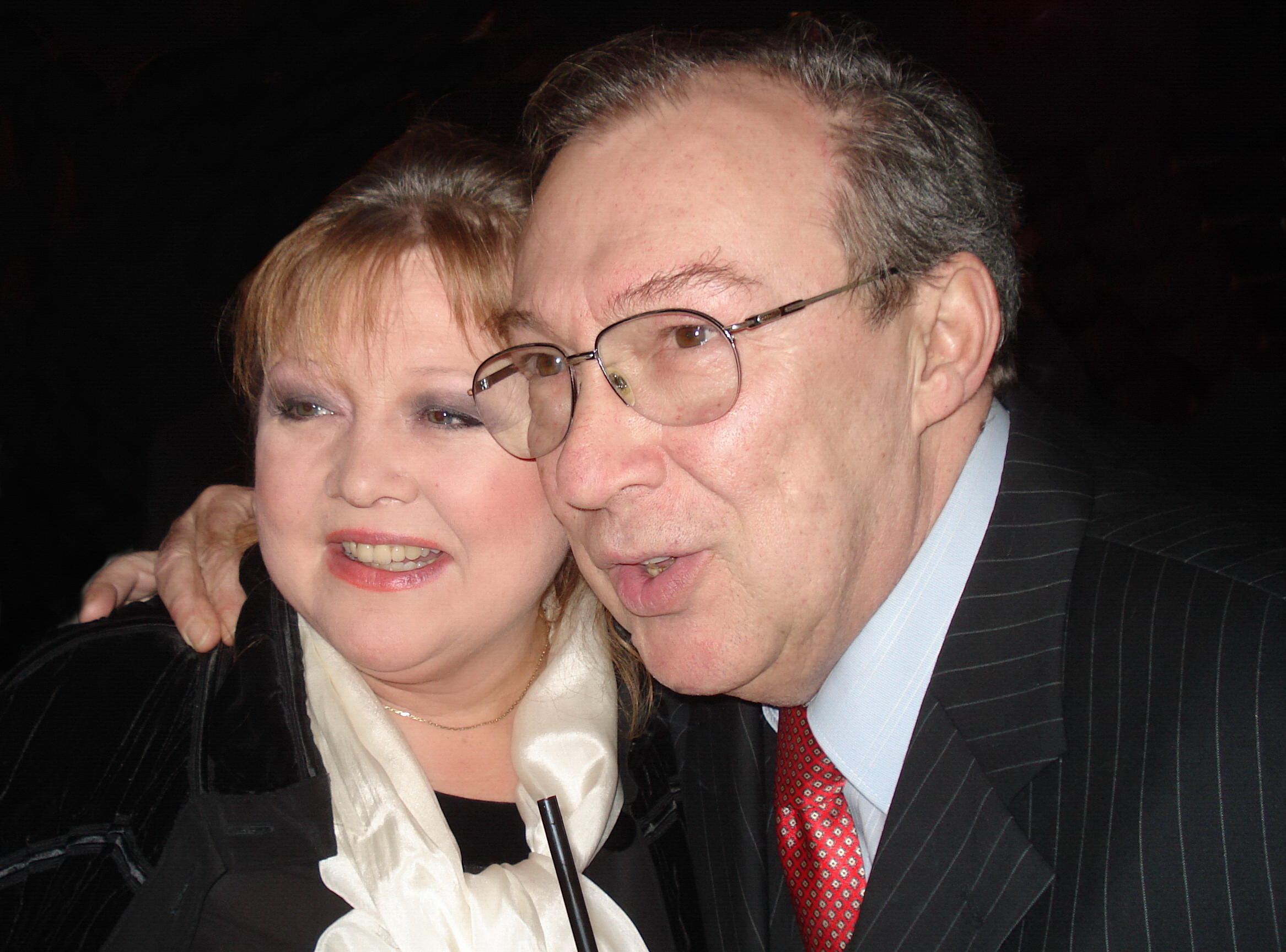
Jaecki Schwarz with Franziska Troegner, 2009

After German reunification in 1989, Schwarz was able to seamlessly build on his success in the GDR. In the 1990s, he was seen in several television shows, such as the family series Spreewaldfamilie. Between 1993 and 2000, he appeared in a total of 38 episodes alongside leading actress Thekla Carola Wied in the ARD crime series Auf eigene Gefahr. He appeared in the hospital drama Für alle Fälle Stefanie between 1997 and 2003. Since 1994, he has played a supporting role in the ZDF crime series Ein starkes Team.

From 1996 until 2012, Schwarz played alongside Wolfgang Winkler as the detective duo Schmücke and Schneider in the crime series Polizeiruf 110.

He has also played major and minor roles in various television films, series, and on the big screen.

== Personal life ==
Schwarz's homosexuality and his relationship with acting colleague Hagen Henning, whom he met in 1986 at the Berlin Ensemble, became publicly known in August 2004. The liaison ended in 2006 after twenty years.

In October 2013, Schwarz suffered an anterior ischemic optic neuropathy in the right eye and has only had ten percent of his eyesight since then.

== Selected filmography ==
=== Film ===
List of film appearances, with year, title, and role shown
Year	Title	Role	Notes
1968	I Was Nineteen	Gregor Hecker	
1969	Weite Straßen – stille Liebe	Herb Schneider	
1971	Rottenknechte	Schwalenberg	5-part television film
1972	Her Third	Young Man	
1981	Bürgschaft für ein Jahr	Peter Müller	
1991	The Tango Player	Harry	

=== Television ===
List of television appearances, with year, title, and role shown
Year	Title	Role	Notes
1970	Jeder stirbt für sich allein		
1973	Stülpner-Legende	Soldier Hupfer	1 episode
1984	Front ohne Gnade	Forensic technician	
1987	Polizeiruf 110	Johannes Stephanie	1 episode
1988	Der Staatsanwalt hat das Wort		
1989	Polizeiruf 110	Wirt Gerber	1 episode
1990	Spreewaldfamilie	Günter	
1993	Tatort		1 episode
1993–2000	At Your Own Risk	Boris Beckmann	
1994–present	Ein starkes Team	Sputnik	
1994	Liebling Kreuzberg		1 episode
1995	Polizeiruf 110	Customs officer Weißer	1 episode
1996–2013	Polizeiruf 110	Herbert Schmücke	
1996	Rosa Roth		
1996	Alarm für Cobra 11 – Die Autobahnpolizei		1 episode
1998	Der letzte Zeuge		1 episode
1998	Spuk aus der Gruft	Coolberry	
2001	Das Traumschiff		
2006	Unter den Linden – Das Haus Gravenhorst	Paul Gravenhorst	
2006	Schloss Einstein		3 episodes
2009	Leipzig Homicide		1 episode
2009	Ein Fall für zwei		1 episode
2011	Cologne P.D.		1 episode
2012–14, 2017	In aller Freundschaft		
2014	Stuttgart Homicide		1 episode
2017	SOKO München		1 episode
