= Story of a Young Couple =

1952 film

- Directed by: Kurt Maetzig
- Written by: Bodo Uhse
- Produced by: Alexander Lösche
- Starring: Yvonne Merin; Hans-Peter Thielen
- Cinematography: Karl Plintzner
- Edited by: Lena Neumann
- Music by: Wilhelm Neef
- Distributed by: Progress Film
- Release date: 18 January 1952
- Running time: 104 minutes
- Country: East Germany
- Language: German

Story of a Young Couple (German: Roman einer jungen Ehe) is an East German film, directed by Kurt Maetzig. It was released in 1952.

== Plot ==
Agnes and Jochen are two young actors who meet and fall in love while appearing in a Berlin production of Nathan the Wise. After the two marry, Agnes is drawn to the communist cause, and begins acting in East German films, which her husband views as sheer propaganda, especially when she recites a poem praising Stalin. When Jochen decides to accept a role in Les Mains Sales, his wife cannot bring herself to follow him, viewing the play as seditious. They decide to divorce. Jochen becomes a celebrated star in the West, but slowly realizes that not all is well. He sees that former influential Nazis are being rehabilitated and witnesses an anti-war demonstration being brutally dispersed by the police. Arriving in the divorce court, he asks Agnes to reconcile with him. The two reunite and move to East Berlin.

== Cast ==
- Yvonne Merin as Agnes Sailer
- Hans-Peter Thielen as Jochen Karsten
- Willy A. Kleinau as Dr. Ulrich Plisch
- Hilde Sessak as Carla
- Martin Hellberg as Möbius
- Hanns Groth as Lutz Frank
- Alfons Mühlhofer as Ernst Winkler
- Horst Preusker as Jonas
- Waltraud Kogel as Asttrid Kern
- Albert Grabe as Otto Dulz
- Brigitte Krause as Brigitte Dulz
- Gisela Rimpler as Felicitas Bach
- Alwin Lippisch as 'Hartmann' (Veit Harlan)
- Theo Shall as Procuror

== Production ==
The script was written by Maetzig and author Bodo Uhse. In part, Story of A Young Couple was intended as a response to Jean-Paul Sartre's anti-communist play Dirty Hands, which is also referenced in the plot. Assistant-director Siegfried Hartmann told an interviewer that the film was made when the Cold War turned into a grim reality, and when Joseph Stalin's cult of personality was at its height, with both those factors heavily influencing the picture. Kurt Maetzig told that "in this film... we attempted to tackle a problem facing every honest German today... namely, the division of our fatherland and the prospects for reunion".

== Reception ==
On 22 January 1952, a Berliner Zeitung columnist wrote that "the film makes us sit up and take notice – and we are pleased to see a film with such sound, humane groundwork". The West German Der Spiegel commented that "Maetzig's work was too 'progressive' even for the party hard-liners" and quoted DEFA official Albert Wilkening who disapproved of the picture, saying that "unfortunately, there is still much rigidity in our film industry".

Seán Allan and John Sandford wrote that the film presented a confrontation between the morally superior Socialist system in East Germany and the barely de-nazified, corrupt one of West Germany, in a manner common in pictures from the Democratic Republic. Peter C. Rollins and John E. O'Connor described Story of A Young Couple as "painfully true to the party line"; according to Alexander Stephan, it also contained anti-American rhetoric typical to the time. Anke Pinkert characterized the picture as one of DEFA's most important "woman films", in which the figure of an emancipated female was the main driver of the plot and played an important role in bringing about social change. John Griffith Urang noted that rather than have love transcend politics, as was the case in Maetzig's Marriage in the Shadows, Story of A Young Couple had the protagonists' romantic relations depend on their world view. In Orphans of the East (Indiana UP, 2015), Constantin Parvulescu shows how the film helps reinterpreting socialist-realist poetics and their relationship to pre-World War II avant-garde.
