= Brigitte Krause =

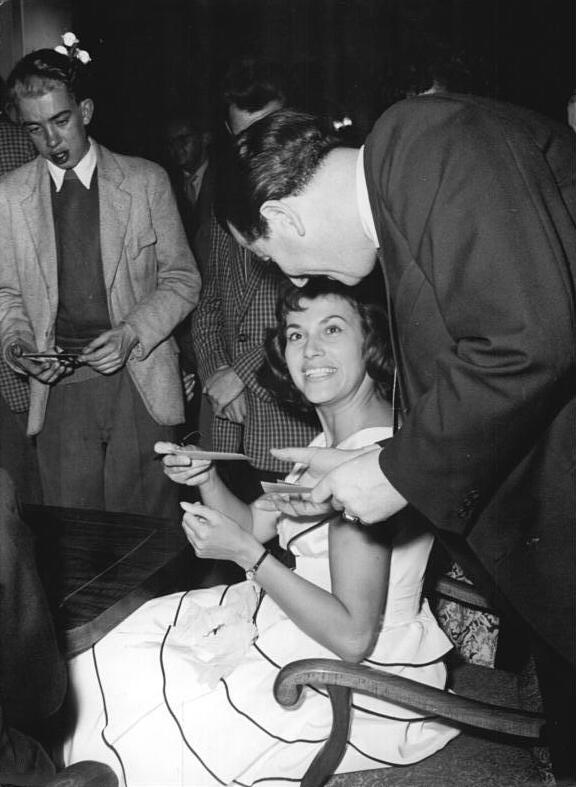
Brigitte Krause (1959)

Brigitte Krause (1929–2007) was a German actress who from 1948 was trained at the East German DEFA studios in Berlin. While still a student, in 1949 she made her debut as Christel in Kurt Maetzig's film Girls in Gingham. She went on to take roles in several other feature films but also appeared on television until the late 1980s, both in series and as an entertainer.

== Biography ==
Born on 9 March 1929 in Berlin, in 1948 Krause joined the DEFA youth studios where she trained as a film actress and was engaged as a newcomer in 1950. In 1949, while still a student She made her debut in Maetzig's Girls in Gingham and also performed in Wolfgang Staudte's drama Rotation. As part of her training as an actress, she also appeared on the stage in Altenburg and Halle, as well as in Berlin and Potsdam. After her graduation, Maetzig gave her minor roles in The Council of the Gods (1950) and Story of a Young Couple (1952).

From the very beginning of experimental television broadcasting in East Germany, by East German television, Krause appeared in DFF's 1952 Christmas programme. She went on to appear frequently in the station's TV series as well as an announcer and entertainer. She was also active on East German radio, appearing for many years in the popular radio series Neumann, zweimal klingeln as well as a continuity announcer. From 1965 to 1989, she performed as a cabaret artist at East Berlin's Distel Theatre. She last performed in 1989 in the first installment of Peter Hagen's television series Johanna.

Krause was married to the actor Gerd Biewer, with whom she had a daughter Maxi Biewer, an actress.

Brigitte Krause died in Berlin on 29 April 2007.
