= Wolfgang Winkler =

Wolfgang Winkler may refer to:

- Wolfgang Winkler (luger)
- Wolfgang Winkler (actor)
