= The Rabbit Is Me =

1965 film

- Directed by: Kurt Maetzig
- Written by: Manfred Bieler; Kurt Maetzig
- Produced by: Martin Sonnabend
- Starring: Angelika Waller
- Cinematography: Erich Gusko
- Edited by: Helga Krause
- Music by: Reiner Bredemeyer, Gerhard Rosenfeld
- Distributed by: Progress Film
- Release date: 26 October 1965
- Running time: 110 minutes
- Country: East Germany
- Language: German

The Rabbit Is Me (German: Das Kaninchen bin ich) is an East German dramatic film directed by Kurt Maetzig. Based on the novel by Manfred Bieler, it was filmed in 1965.

== Plot ==
Nineteen-year-old Maria Morzeck dreams of studying Slavistics, but her hopes are shattered when her brother, Dieter, is sent to prison after being convicted of sedition against the state. She cannot enter college, and becomes a waitress. Maria meets and falls in love with Paul Deister, an older, married man who turns out to be the judge who convicted her brother. Their affair ends when Deister is exposed as hypocritical and corrupt. After Dieter's release, he learns of his sister's relationship with the judge and assaults her. Eventually, Maria distances herself from both of them, and decides to pursue her forgotten dream.

== Cast ==
- Angelika Waller as Maria Morzeck
- Alfred Müller as Paul Deister
- Ilse Voigt as Aunt Hete
- Wolfgang Winkler as Dieter Morzeck
- Irma Münch as Gabriele Deister
- Rudolf Ulrich as Grambov
- Helmut Schellhardt as the mayor
- Annemarie Esper as Edith
- Willi Schrade as Ulli
- Willi Narloch as Oscar

== Production ==
The film was based on Manfred Bieler's book Maria Morzeck or the Rabbit is Me, which at the time only existed as a manuscript and was later published in 1969. It was made in the aftermath of the VI Party Congress of the Socialist Unity Party in January 1963, during which the establishment allowed a measure of liberalization in the cultural life of East Germany. Although Bieler's novel was highly critical of the court system, he and Maetzig took care to include several "alibi scenes" in the film that were intended to put the state in a better light and also prevent the banning of the picture. The scenes were also meant to present the judicial reforms that took place between 1961 and 1963.

== Reception ==
The short era of liberalization ended gradually when Leonid Brezhnev took power in the Soviet Union and introduced a conservative, more repressive course on cultural issues. The film, alongside eleven other cinematic works that were deemed politically damaging, was banned by the Central Committee of the SED at its XI Plenum in December 1965. It was only made legal again in 1990. The banned films were known as "cellar films" or "rabbit films" - the second sobriquet having been derived from the film's title.

In 1990, shortly before the collapse of the Eastern Bloc, the picture was released for public screening, and presented in the Berlin and Locarno film festivals. In 1995 it was selected as one of the 100 most important German films by a group of historians and critics.

Daniela Berghahn noted that The Rabbit Is Me was unprecedented in its portrayal of judicial corruption, sexual themes and criticism of the East German establishment.

== Bibliography ==
- Adge, Günter, ed. (2000). Kahlschlag.: Das 11. Plenum der ZK der SED 1965. Studien und Dokumente (in German) (2nd ed.). Berlin: Aufbau Taschenbuch. ISBN 978-3-7466-8045-3.
- Allan, Seán; Sandford, John, eds. (1999). DEFA: East German Cinema, 1946–1992. New York: Berghahn Books. ISBN 978-1-57181-753-2.
- Berghahn, Daniela (2005). Hollywood Behind the Wall: The Cinema of East Germany. Manchester: Manchester University Press. ISBN 978-0-7190-6172-1.
- Bock, Hans-Michael; Bergfelder, Tim, eds. (2009). The Concise Cinegraph: Encyclopaedia of German Cinema. New York: Berghahn Books. ISBN 978-1-57181-655-9.
- Feinstein, Joshua (2002). The Triumph of the Ordinary: Depictions of Daily Life in the East German Cinema, 1949–1989. Chapel Hill: University of North Carolina Press. ISBN 978-0-8078-5385-6.
- Mückenberger, Christiane, ed. (1990). Prädikat: Besonders schädlich. Filmtexte. Berlin: Henschel. ISBN 978-3-362-00478-7.
- Poss, Ingrid; Warnecke, Peter, eds. (2006). Spur der Filme: Zeitzeugen über die DEFA (in German). Berlin: Links Verlag. ISBN 978-3-86153-401-3.
