= Maxi Biewer =

German television presenter and actress

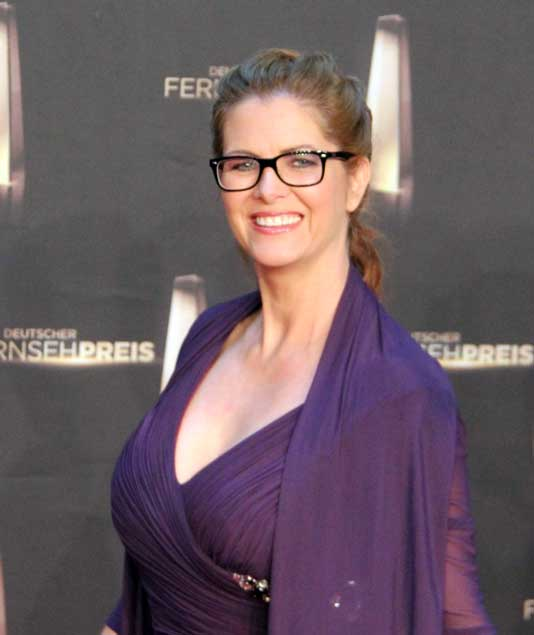
Maxi Biewer (2012)

Maxi Biewer (born 24 May 1964) is a German television presenter and actress.

Biewer was born in Berlin, the daughter of actor Gerd Biewer and Brigitte Krause. She speaks German, English, Russian, and French. Biewer attended a Polytechnic High School in Berlin, Köpenick, where she also passed the Abitur. She graduated from the Academy of Dramatic Arts "Ernst Busch" in Berlin.

Between 1987 and 1989 she served in an ensemble of actors on East German television in guest roles and worked at the Theater Dessau. In 1989 Biewer moved to West Berlin, and since 1992 she has been the weather presenter at RTL Television. She achieved some notoriety for a televised fit of laughter she suffered while presenting a weather forecast on the RTL Morning Program Punkt 6 and for one of her presentations on the same program which was set to music by Stefan Raab. In 2010 Biewer played herself as an RTL weather expert in the award-winning series Doctor's Diary, which aired in January 2011.

In 1996 she was romantically linked with the RTL morning show presenter Wolfram Kons. A year later she married the French-Canadian Jean-Patrice Venn, whom she met on one of her many trips to Montreal. Biewer currently lives with her husband in Hennef. She spends much of her spare time on a sailboat on the Baltic Sea.

== Filmography (selection) ==
- 1981: Der Kuckuck bin ich
- 1983: Rügensagen
- 1984: Kaskade rückwärts
- 1984: Polizeiruf 110: Schwere Jahre (1. Teil) (TV series)
- 1985: Ferienheim Bergkristall: Ein Fall für Alois (TV Series)
- 1985: Ernst Thälmann
- 1987: Maxe Baumann aus Berlin (television Film)
- 1987: Sachsens Glanz und Preußens Gloria (TV miniseries)
- 1987: Der Geisterseher
- 1987: Glück hat seine Zeit
- 1987: Sidonies Bilder
- 1987: Vater gesucht
- 1988: Der Staatsanwalt hat das Wort: Ohne Wenn und Aber (TV series)
- 1989: Der lange Weg zu Angerer
- 1989: Polizeiruf 110: Der Wahrheit verpflichtet (TV series)
- 1989: Auf den zweiten Blick
- 1990: Himmelsschlüssel
- 1990: Unser Lehrer Doktor Specht (TV series)
- 1996: The Venus Killer
