= For Eyes Only =

1963 film

- Directed by: János Veiczi
- Written by: Harry Thürk
- Produced by: Siegfried Kabitzke
- Starring: Alfred Müller
- Cinematography: Karl Plintzner
- Edited by: Christel Ehrlich
- Music by: Günter Hauk
- Production company: DEFA
- Distributed by: Progress Film
- Release date: 2 August 1963 (premiere held on 19 July)
- Running time: 103 minutes
- Country: East Germany
- Language: German

For Eyes Only (alternatively Streng Geheim (Top Secret)) is an East German espionage film. It was released in 1963.

== Plot ==
In 1961, Hansen has seemingly escaped from East Germany and now works for an American company called Concordia in West Germany. Hansen is actually an agent of the Stasi, and Concordia is the headquarters of the Military Intelligence Division in Germany, from which countless saboteurs and spies have been sent over the border to wreak havoc in East Germany. The United States plans to invade the country, after staging an internal uprising as a provocation to intervene. The plans are held by Collins, Hansen's superior. The latter intends to steal them, but has to evade the suspicions of security officer Rocker, who knows there is a leak. Hansen is assisted by his chauffeur, František, who has uncovered his covert identity but intends to help him, in order to return to his homeland Czechoslovakia. The two manage to steal the safe with the invasion plans and cross the border to the East, pursued by the police and army. The plan is publicized and the invasion has to be canceled.

== Cast ==
- Alfred Müller: Hansen
- Helmut Schreiber: Major Ted Collins
- Ivan Palec: František
- Hans Lucke: Colonel Rock
- Werner Lierck: Schuck
- Martin Flörchinger: Stasi colonel
- Peter Marx: Hartmann
- Eva-Maria Hagen: Peggy
- Rolf Herricht: Max
- Gerd E. Schäfer: Charly
- Christine Laszar: Hella
- Ingrid Ohlenschläger: Liz
- Renate Geißler: Gisela
- Marion van de Kamp: Adelheid
- Eberhard Esche: Stasi agent
- Norbert Flohr: Manfred
- Peter Friedrich: bearded man
- Georg Gudzent: MID general
- Hans Köcke: man with glass eye

== Production ==
The idea to make For Eyes Only was conceived by dramatist Hans Lucke, who also played a role in the film. Although its main theme – the planned invasion of the GDR by American-led NATO forces – was a common motif in East German propaganda since the beginning of the Cold War, author Bernd Stöver viewed For Eyes Only as the final link in a chain of publications, starting at 1958, intended by the government to demonstrate the necessity of building the Berlin Wall and to justify it after it was erected. Dramatist Heinz Hafke commented that "the Imperialist forces view the Cold War as a never-ending struggle against the Socialist states. The Cold War can become hot instantly, if the forces of peace let down their guard. In this film, although we took some artistic liberties, we based the plot on actual people and documents... The setting of the story sometime before 13 August 1961 is justified and is supported by fact." Stöver claimed that the picture was to give the impression that the planned invasion was prevented by building the wall. This was reinforced by the disclaimer that announced: "Resemblance to real persons is intended".

The film's plot was loosely based on three actual espionage affairs: primarily, it was modeled after the case of Horst Hesse, an East German agent who infiltrated the American Military Intelligence Division in 1955 and managed to smuggle out two safes containing classified documents, which allowed the Stasi to uncover some 140 spies. Hesse was celebrated as a hero in East Germany - largely due to the film's success - but later research established that his role in the operation was exaggerated. The chief protagonist Hansen was meant to allude to him. The invasion plans mentioned in the film were inspired by DECO II, an operational plan of the Bundeswehr to attack the GDR, which was known to the Stasi since 1955 but was given great publicity in the early 1960s as proof for the danger of imminent invasion. The producers also mentioned MC-96, a NATO plan to use tactical nuclear weapons in East Germany, as another inspiration. The fifth column of Western saboteurs referred to in the film, that were to organize a second '17 June 1953', was based on a network uncovered in 1959, when three American agents related to it were captured in Karl-Marx-Stadt.

The producers received full cooperation from the Stasi, and several officers from the service were used as consultants. Director János Veiczi saw actor Alfred Müller in theater, playing Phileas Fogg, and offered him the main role. Principal photography took place in Leipzig. Müller, who had no driving license, was only shot in the Opel Kapitän used in the filming when it was being pushed or towed, while a member of the production team drove it in the car chase scenes.

== Reception ==
The film was viewed by 800,000 people in the first month after its release, and also exported to other Eastern Bloc countries, selling 9,000,000 tickets overall. On 5 October 1964, Veiczi and writer Harry Thürk both received the National Prize of East Germany, 3rd Class for For Eyes Only Erich Mielke personally awarded the National People's Army Medal of Merit to Thürk, editor Christel Ehrlich, the dramatists and the leading actors. Composer Günter Hauk was awarded the Heinrich Greif Prize on 17 May 1966, in recognition of his work on the picture's soundtrack.

The film was received in a highly positive manner in the East German press: on 23 July 1963, the critic of the Schweriner Volkszeitung wrote: "it is thrilling, because its plot is true: a real plan to invade our country existed, but had to be canceled after 13 August 1961." On 10 August 1963, a commentator in Das Freie Wort noted "there is nothing fictional in there... Bonn constantly declares its intention to 'free' East Germany."

Peter Ulrich Weiß, who researched Cold War media in East Germany, pointed out that the film presented a highly politicized portrayal of the characters: Stasi agent Hansen was depicted as humane and devoted to his country, while being contrasted with the West Germans: he was only suspected, as one of the MID personnel tells in the film, because "he is the only one from the East... and the only one to have served during World War II merely as an infantry corporal. All the rest of our German employees have all either been in the SD or the Gestapo, or at the least in the SS." The Americans in the film - whose authenticity was enhanced by having the actors speak in American English, with a German dubbing over it - were all negative characters: one is active in trading stolen art, others are serial fornicators and another makes antisemitic remarks. One more Cold War token figure was Hansen's Czechoslovak driver, who longs to return to his Socialist homeland. When he realizes his employer is a spy, he volunteers to help him in exchange for being allowed to flee with him to East Germany. Daniela Berghahn considered For Eyes Only as the most famous and successful spy thriller ever made in the GDR.
