= Heinz Behrens =

German actor (1932–2022)

Heinz Behrens (30 September 1932 – 9 August 2022) was a German actor. He gained notoriety in the GDR primarily through the portrayal of Horst Baumann in the DFF comedy series Maxe Baumann and in the role of Karl-Heinz in the 20-part series Rentner haben niemals Zeit.

== Select filmography ==
- KLK Calling PTZ – The Red Orchestra
- Bürgschaft für ein Jahr
- Du bist nicht allein
