= Berlin im Aufbau =

1946 film

- Directed by: Kurt Maetzig
- Written by: Marion Keller
- Distributed by: DEFA
- Release date: 1946
- Running time: 22 minutes
- Country: East Germany
- Language: German

Berlin im Aufbau (English: Berlin under Construction) is an East German documentary film directed by Kurt Maetzig, one of East Germany's most respected film-makers, between 1945 and 1946. It was a prominent 22 minute documentary, released in 1946 and produced by the DEFA film company. Maetzig was assisted in the assembly of the film by Marion Keller, who had also scripted and organized several other propaganda films of the late 1940s.

The film has historical significance in that it documents the first phase of the rebuilding of the destroyed city of Berlin after World War II and was one of three documentaries produced in the immediate aftermath examining the reconstruction of the city. The documentary explores the redevelopments in culture, transport, health care and education, industry and trade, compiled using newsreel footage of eyewitnesses. It also explores the marked social changes since the fall of Nazi Germany; in one scene a Jewish carpenter is helping a German man on a rooftop reconstructing it.

The film is essentially a propaganda film, intended to raise the morale of the people after the devastation and showing promise to the nation in the redevelopment programme. However in making the film, like Joop Huisken, who was assigned to make a similar film of Potsdam entitled Potsdam baut auf, Maetzig was careful not to exaggerate the achievements and courage of the people, keeping it realistic. Like other similar "Aufbau" films, this one begins with a brief German history, and provides a narrative showing how the disordered past can be put back into order, and how through their diligent labor, the German people can be seen as productive members of a post-war society. The film also highlighted post-war perceptions of gender in that females were typified as being wives and girlfriends while also being acceptable as equal partners in the workforce.
