= Der Augenzeuge =

Film series

Der Augenzeuge (The Eyewitness) was the newsreel in the Soviet Occupation Zone and in the German Democratic Republic (GDR) and was produced by the state film company DEFA. It appeared with a length of 15 minutes from 19 February 1946 to 19 December 1980 (issue 52/1980).

All issues of Der Augenzeuge are made accessible and licensable as part of DEFA's entire film heritage via the PROGRESS archive platform.

== History ==
Newsreels had been released in Germany since 1914 and were regularly shown in cinemas before the main films.

After World War II, the National Socialist newsreel Die Deutsche Wochenschau produced by UFA was cancelled by the Grand Alliance and replaced by new newsreels in the three German occupation zones. The American and the British occupation zone produced Welt im Film, the French occupation zone Blick in die Welt and Soviet occupation zone Der Augenzeuge.

Der Augenzeuge was published bi-weekly in the beginning and weekly from August 1946. The newsreel was named by Marion Keller, the editor-in-chief from 1947 to 1948.

From issue 12/1946 to issue 1/1949, every episode began with the campaign Kinder suchen ihre Eltern (Children seek their parents), which took up a suggestion by children's author and screenwriter Erich Kästner. Approximately 400 children were able to find their parents with their help.

From the 13th issue onwards the motto Sie sehen selbst, Sie hören selbst, urteilen Sie selbst! (You see for yourself, you hear for yourself, judge for yourself!) devised by its first editor-in-chief Kurt Maetzig appeared at the top of each newsreel. With the founding of the GDR in October 1949, the Socialist Unity Party of Germany (SED) increasingly exerted its influence on reporting, the slogan was abolished and the newsreel was mainly used for SED propaganda. After the East German uprising of 1953, the editorial paternalism was reduced and Der Augenzeuge became more cosmopolitan again.

== See also ==
- DEFA
- PROGRESS
