= Alfred Balthoff =

German actor and voice actor

- Born: 8 December 1905; Peiskretscham, Upper Silesia, German Empire
- Died: 8 March 1989 (aged 83); Vienna, Austria
- Occupation: Actor
- Years active: 1947-1982 (film & TV)

Alfred Balthoff (1905 – 1989) was a German stage, film and television actor. He also worked as a voice actor, dubbing foreign releases for the German-speaking market. Of Jewish background, he spent the final years of the Nazi era in hiding. In the immediate post-war years he made several films in the Eastern Zone for DEFA, but later established himself in West Germany.

== Selected filmography ==
- Marriage in the Shadows (1947)
- Wozzeck (1947)
- The Marriage of Figaro (1949)
- Our Daily Bread (1949)
- Love's Awakening (1953)
- The Great Test (1954)
- Bon Voyage (1954)
- Confess, Doctor Corda (1958)
- Dorothea Angermann (1959)
- A Thousand Stars Aglitter (1959)
- The Death Ship (1959)
- Blind Justice (1961)
- Murderer in the Fog (1964)
- All People Will Be Brothers (1973)

== Bibliography ==
- Noack, Frank. Veit Harlan: The Life and Work of a Nazi Filmmaker. University Press of Kentucky, 2016.
