= Engel im Fegefeuer =

1964 film

- Directed by: Herrmann Zschoche
- Release date: 1964
- Country: East Germany
- Language: German

Engel im Fegefeuer is an East German film. It was released in 1964.
