= Ein starkes Team =

German crime television series

- Genre: Crime
- Written by: Leo P. Ard; Birgit Grosz; Eva & Volker A. Zahn
- Starring: Florian Martens; Stefanie Stappenbeck; Jaecki Schwarz; Arnfried Lerche; Matthi Faust; Tayfun Bademsoy; Leonard Lansink; Maja Maranow; Kai Lentrodt
- Country of origin: Germany
- Original language: German
- No. of episodes: 89 (May 2022)

Production
- Production location: Berlin
- Running time: 90 minutes

Original release
- Network: ZDF
- Release: March 28, 1994 – present

Ein starkes Team Logo

Ein starkes Team (German for: "a strong team") is a German crime television series developed by the German television channel ZDF since March 1994. Up to four new 90-minute episodes are broadcast annually, resulting in a current total of 89 episodes. Each episode usually revolves around an intricate murder case, regularly coinciding with events in the private lives of the main characters.

== Background ==
In 1993, ZDF began work on the crime comedy Gemischtes Doppel (German for: "mixed doubles"); a buddy cop film where Ossi and Wessi police officers got teamed up in the wake of the Peaceful Revolution. Against their wills, Verena Berthold, a self-confident and seasoned detective chief superintendent who grew up in West Germany, was partnered with Otto Garber, a slightly peculiar, solitary, and somewhat grumpy Volkspolizei officer, who doesn't think highly of women in policing, or self-confident women. The clash between the two characters thematicized the culture shock many residents from the former eastern and western parts of Berlin experienced in the early 1990s as a result of the 1989 fall of the Berlin Wall.

In the early planning stages, Maja Maranow was cast for the female lead. The male lead character was still vacant when at the opening party of André Hennicke's pub, co-director Konrad Sabrautzky got talking to actor Florian Martens, whom he deemed perfect for the role. Maranow checked him out at the party as well, and Martens received a call from his agent the next day.

Gemischtes Doppel was originally planned as a one-off TV movie, airing on 28 March 1994. However, due to the overwhelming viewer response, the sequel Erbarmungslos (German for: "merciless") was filmed, which aired on 23 September 1995. The concept was subsequently developed into the series Ein starkes Team for ZDF's prime-time crime film slot on Saturday nights, of which it is now the oldest still running series. Critics have noted that after two decades, the carefully crafted and contrasting biographies of the lead roles have faded and made way for a cast with less of a backstory, resulting in a more generic crime series.

== The Team ==
The series originally starred detective chief superintendents Verena Berthold (played by Maja Maranow) and Otto Garber (Florian Martens) as the main characters. They became a team following the German reunification, which caused the East-German Volkspolizei, where Otto was working, to be incorporated in the (West-German) Kriminalpolizei. They became partners in a special unit in Berlin, led by commissioner Lothar Reddemann (Arnfried Lerche), and also including the detective chief superintendents Yüksel Yüsgüler (Tayfun Bademsoy, whose character died in episode 43 in 2009) and Georg Scholz (Leonard Lansink; until episode 29 in 2005). After Georg's departure, detective Ben Kolberg (Kai Lentrodt: in episode 30 in 2005) joined the team. He was later promoted to chief superintendent, and left the team in episode 70 (2017) to make a sailing trip around the world, returning in episode 89 (2022) for an undercover operation with fatal consequences. In episode 72, his position as chief superintendent was filled with Sebastian Klöckner (Matthi Faust).

In August 2015, Maja Maranow announced to be leaving the series to focus on other movies, but she died of breast cancer on 4 January 2016 at age 54, five days before the air date of the last episode in which she starred. In the following episode, Verena (her character in the series) was said to have emigrated to Australia, and was replaced by detective Linett Wachow (Stefanie Stappenbeck; as of episode 65 in 2016). In episode 56 (2013), the character of Verena was out of town to follow advanced training, while in reality, Maranow was undergoing chemotherapy and could not attend the filming of this episode. In this episode, the female lead was overtaken by Ulrike Krumbiegel, who played the role of a former colleague and friend of Otto, named Katharina Dammers.

A running gag in the series is Otto's former colleague from the Volkspolizei, Sputnik (Jaecki Schwarz). He changes jobs between each episode, and provides schnapps, ironic remarks, advice, and practical support to the "strong" team. His many activities include running a Currywurst-stand, owning a sushi bar, exploiting the police cafeteria, organizing pub crawls for tourists, owning a corner pub in Ostalgie style, cooking at a French cuisine temple, starting a miniature golf course, being a credit counsellor, serving as matchmaker, operator of a go-kart racing track, acting as eulogist, etc. His entrepreneurial endeavours always end in failure.

== DVD release ==
Release date	DVD title	Distributor	Episodes
10 September 2010	Ein starkes Team, Volume 1	Universum Film GmbH	10, 12, 16, and 17
18 February 2011	Ein starkes Team, Volume 2	Universum Film GmbH	18, 20, 22, and 24
6 May 2011	Ein starkes Team, Volume 3	Universum Film GmbH	25, 27, 28, and 29
21 June 2019	Ein starkes Team, Box 12	Studio Hamburg Enterprises	71–76
26 July 2019	Ein starkes Team, Box 11	Studio Hamburg Enterprises	65–70
27 September 2019	Ein starkes Team, Box 1	Studio Hamburg Enterprises	1–8
25 October 2019	Ein starkes Team, Box 2	Studio Hamburg Enterprises	9–16
13 December 2019	Ein starkes Team, Box 9	Studio Hamburg Enterprises	53–58
21 February 2020	Ein starkes Team, Box 8	Studio Hamburg Enterprises	47–52
27 March 2020	Ein starkes Team, Box 3	Studio Hamburg Enterprises	17–22
12 June 2020	Ein starkes Team, Box 4	Studio Hamburg Enterprises	23–28
31 July 2020	Ein starkes Team, Box 5	Studio Hamburg Enterprises	29–34
25 September 2020	Ein starkes Team, Box 6	Studio Hamburg Enterprises	35–40
12 February 2021	Ein starkes Team, Box 7	Studio Hamburg Enterprises	41–46
30 April 2021	Ein starkes Team, Box 13	Studio Hamburg Enterprises	77–82
9 July 2021	Ein starkes Team, Box 10	Studio Hamburg Enterprises	59–64

== See also ==
- List of German television series
