= Wolfgang Winkler (actor) =

German actor (1943–2019)

- Born: 2 March 1943; Görlitz, Nazi Germany
- Died: 7 December 2019 (aged 76)
- Occupation: Actor
- Known for: The Rabbit Is Me, Das Mädchen auf dem Brett, I Was Nineteen, Polizeiruf 110

Wolfgang Winkler (2 March 1943 – 7 December 2019) was a German actor. Born in Görlitz, he was best known for starring in films such as The Rabbit Is Me, Das Mädchen auf dem Brett and I Was Nineteen, as well as playing Hauptkommissar Herbert Schneider in the television series Polizeiruf 110.

== Selected filmography ==
- 1965: The Rabbit Is Me
- 1966: Harras, der Polizeihund – episode: Die Party (TV)
- 1967: Das Mädchen auf dem Brett
- 1968: I Was Nineteen
- 1968: Nadel und Bajonett (Fernsehtheater Moritzburg)
- 1968: Das Ende vom Anfang (Fernsehtheater Moritzburg)
- 1969: Fastnachtsspiele des Hans Sachs (Fernsehtheater Moritzburg)
- 1969: Ungewöhnlicher Ausflug (Fernsehtheater Moritzburg)
- 1969: Drei von der K (TV)
- 1970: Leichensache Zernik (unfinished film)
- 1970: Die Geldheirat (Fernsehtheater Moritzburg)
- 1971: Wer zuletzt lacht ... (Fernsehtheater Moritzburg)
- 1971: Rottenknechte (TV)
- 1971: Zeit der Störche
- 1972: Der Mann nach der Uhr oder Der ordentliche Mann (Fernsehtheater Moritzburg)
- 1972: Euch werd ich’s zeigen
- 1973: Das zweite Leben des Friedrich Wilhelm Georg Platow
- 1973: Zement (TV film)
- 1974: … verdammt, ich bin erwachsen
- 1975: Broddi (TV)
- 1975: Bankett für Achilles
- 1975: Bedtime Story (Fernsehtheater Moritzburg)
- 1975: Spätpodium: Als ich auf dem Wacholder saß (Fernsehtheater Moritzburg)
- 1976: Ein altes Modell (TV)
- 1977: Scherz, Satire, Ironie und tiefere Bedeutung (Theateraufzeichnung)
- 1977: Ein Schneemann für Afrika
- 1977: Gefährliche Fahndung (TV)
- 1978: Des kleinen Lokführers große Fahrt
- 1978: Spuk unterm Riesenrad (TV)
- 1978: Geschichten aus dem Wiener Wald (Theateraufzeichnung)
- 1979: Kleistertopf und Tantentricks (Fernsehtheater Moritzburg)
- 1979: Polizeiruf 110: Am Abgrund (TV)
- 1979: Tull (Fernsehfilm)
- 1979: Das Pferdemädchen
- 1980: Max und siebeneinhalb Jungen
- 1981: Nora S. (Fernsehfilm)
- 1981: Darf ich Petruschka zu dir sagen?
- 1981: Der Dicke und ich
- 1982: Polizeiruf 110: Schranken (TV series)
- 1982: Urlaub mit Überraschungen (Fernsehtheater Moritzburg)
- 1983: Schwierig sich zu verloben
- 1983: Die Schüsse der Arche Noah
- 1984: Das Puppenheim in Pinnow (TV film)
- 1984: Eisenbahnerfamilie (narrator)
- 1984: Pension Butterpilz – Das Freizeitparadies (Fernsehtheater Moritzburg)
- 1985: Die Wette (Fernsehtheater Moritzburg)
- 1985: Der Staatsanwalt hat das Wort: Hubertusjagd
- 1986: Der Hut des Brigadiers
- 1986: Rabenvater
- 1986: Hilde, das Dienstmädchen
- 1987: Der Schwur von Rabenhorst
- 1987: Liane
- 1988: Tiere machen Leute (TV series, 9 episodes)
- 1988: Revision zu dritt (Fernsehtheater Moritzburg)
- 1988: Mit Leib und Seele
- 1988: Polizeiruf 110: Ihr faßt mich nie! (TV)
- 1988: Das Herz des Piraten
- 1989: Johanna (TV series)
- 1989: Polizeiruf 110: Variante Tramper (TV series)
- 1989: Polizeiruf 110: Unsichtbare Fährten (TV series)
- 1989: Der Drache Daniel
- 1990: Über die Grenzen
- 1990: Abschiedsdisco
- 1991: The Age of the Fish
- 1991: Der Strass
- 1992: Das große Fest
- 1992: Karl May (TV miniseries)
- 1993: Grüß Gott, Genosse (TV)
- 1993: Polizeiruf 110: Tod im Kraftwerk (TV series)
- 1994: Liebling Kreuzberg: Rote Ohren (TV)
- 1995: Polizeiruf 110: Sieben Tage Freiheit (TV series)
- 1995: Wir sind auch nur ein Volk (TV series)
- 1995: Tatort: Tödliche Freundschaft (TV series)
- 1996: Tatort: Wer nicht schweigt, muß sterben (TV)
- 1996: Kurklinik Rosenau (TV series)
- 1996–2013: Polizeiruf 110 (TV series, 50 episodes), as Hauptkommissar Schneider
- 1997: Eine Frau nach Maß
- 2001: Heinrich der Säger
- 2003: Fliege kehrt zurück
- 2004, 2006: Schloss Einstein (TV), as Hauptkommissar Schneider
- 2004: Fliege hat Angst
- 2005: Rotkäppchen
- 2008: Tischlein deck dich
- 2008: Sechs Tage, Sechs Nächte. 100 Jahre Berliner Sechstagerennen
- 2009: Tango im Schnee
- 2012: Die Männer der Emden
- 2012: Leipzig Homicide: Getrieben
- 2012: Fallwurf Böhme – Die wundersamen Wege eines Linkshänders (narrator)
- 2015–2019: Rentnercops (TV series, 40 episodes)
- 2017: Die Spezialisten – Im Namen der Opfer (TV series, episode: Bum Bum)
- 2018: Wolfsland: Der steinerne Gast

== Literature ==
- Frank-Burkhard Habel, Volker Wachter: Lexikon der DDR-Stars. Schauspieler aus Film und Fernsehen. Schwarzkopf & Schwarzkopf, Berlin 1999, ISBN 3-89602-304-7
- Frank-Burkhard Habel, Volker Wachter: Das große Lexikon der DDR-Stars. Die Schauspieler aus Film und Fernsehen. Erweiterte Neuausgabe. Schwarzkopf & Schwarzkopf, Berlin 2002, ISBN 3-89602-391-8
- Günter Helmes, Steffi Schültzke (Hrsg.): Das Fernsehtheater Moritzburg. Institution und Spielplan. Leipziger Universitätsverlag, Leipzig 2003. ISBN 3-936522-99-5.
- Claudia Kusebauch (Hrsg.): Fernsehtheater Moritzburg II. Programmgeschichte. Leipziger Universitätsverlag, Leipzig 2005. ISBN 3-86583-015-3.
  - Claudia Kusebauch (unter Mitarbeit von Michael Grisko): Das Fernsehtheater Moritzburg – Programmchronologie. Ebd., S. 15–208.
- Frank-Burkhard Habel: Lexikon. Schauspieler in der DDR. Verlag Neues Leben, Berlin 2009, ISBN 978-3-355-01760-2
