= Frank-Burkhard Habel =

German film historian

Frank-Burkhard Habel is a German scholar of the film and television industries. Since the 1970s he has worked as a film-journalist and, more broadly, as a commentator and lecturer on the films sector. He has worked as a screenwriter and, having made his stage debut as a child actor in the 1960s, has appeared in a succession of television dramas but only, as an actor, in supporting roles. After reunification he switched to freelance work, taking on a number of the jobs that he previously performed within the East German state directed movie industry. Since the 1990s he has written a number of books on cinema and television history. Currently he is a regular columnist on the daily (still) left-wing newspaper Junge Welt.

== Life ==
Frank-Burkhard Habel was born at around the same time as the 1953 East German uprising: he grew up in the Prenzlauer Berg district of East Berlin. While still at school he gained stage experience as a child actor. While still young received stage training from a number of members of the East German stage and film establishment, including Benno Besson, Fritz Decho and Rudolf Ulrich. Without pausing - at this point - to obtain university-level qualifications, in 1971 he joined the theatre company of Berlin's "Theater im 12. Stock", and sustained his association with this theatre (subsequently rebranded as the Zimmertheater Karlshorst) till 2005. After he started to work in television he very quickly became something of a part-timer at the theatre, however.

Soon after joining the theatre company at the "Zimmertheater" he accepted a position with the DFF, East Germany's monopoly television company. Here he was appointed production manager. He worked on television adaptations of novels and stage works by Noël Coward, George Bernard Shaw, Thomas Wolfe and Stanisław Lem. During the 1970s his remit also covered television dramas for mass audiences, including the popular police-drama series "Polizeiruf 110" and the crime-drama series "Der Staatsanwalt hat das Wort".

Between the late 1970s and 1989, Habel also worked in the movie distribution department at the East German National Film Archive in East Berlin. There was, however, a substantial break in his working career in 1980 when he embarked on a degree course at the East German National Film Academy (in 1985 renamed '"Filmuniversität Babelsberg Konrad Wolf"), emerging in 1984 with a degree in Film and Television Studies. His degree course concluded with the requirement to submit a dissertation: Habel's dissertation was on a series of short satirical films produced by a group at the DEFA studios (East German National Film Studios) between 1953 and 1964 known as the Stacheltier (hedgehog) series. As a graduate of it, he retained his links with the Film Academy at Babelsberg. He appeared in a number of student films during the later 1980s. Particularly noteworthy was his appearance in what sources identify as a "James Bond parody", entitled "Live and Let Die", and directed by Dror Zahavi who was a student contemporary at the academy. At the 1984 (so-called) "Potsdam International Student Film Festival", Habel's performance earned him that year's "best actor" prize.

1989 was a year of intensifying tensions on the city streets, and there was a growing perception that changes must be on the way even if there was little clear idea consensus as to what that might involve. During the summer Habel launched himself as a freelancer, undertaking a range of jobs in the worlds of film, television and cinema. Sources report that over the next couple of years he earned his living variously as an author, as a dramaturge, in film distribution, as a critic, as a prize-jury member, as an exhibition curator, as a presenter-moderator and as an actor. He also accepted a number of invitations to work as a guest lecturer at various educational institutions, both within East Germany and abroad.

Habel has involved himself in a number of arts organisations, especially since 1990. He was a founder member of the Interessenverband Filmkommunikation (IVFK), as it known at its launch in 1990 as an umbrella organisation representing and promoting the interests of arts cinemas and film club in the so-called "New Federal states" ("Neue Bundesländer" - former East Germany) and immediately became a member of the IVFK executive committee. In this context he was also a co-founder of the Cottbus film festival. Ahead of 1995, he also teamed up with Wim Wenders to organise the "First hundred years of cinema in Berlin" association as a way to organise celebration of the centenary identified. Since 2002, Habel has been deputy chair of the "Berlin Film and Television Association". In addition, between 2009 and 2013, and again since 2019, he has served as alternating president of the Kurt Tucholsky Association.

Frank-Burkhard Habel has pursued a parallel career as a film journalist since the later 1970s. More recently he has also authored a number of books. He wrote regularly for Die Weltbühne and then for its post-reunification successor publication Das Blättchen. He also writes or has written for Sonntag, Film und Fernsehen, Beiträge zur Film- und Fernsehwissenschaft and various daily newspapers. He founded the film review magazine "Filmklub-Kurier" in 1990 and ran it till 1993. Since the mid 1990s, he has published more than a dozen books on film, television and related themes, frequently with a focus on cinema history and the silent film era. Another theme to which he returns in several of his books is the history of cinema and television in East Germany (1949-1989).
