= Jürgen Frohriep =

German actor

- Born: 28 April 1928; Rostock, Germany
- Died: 13 July 1993 (aged 65); Berlin, Germany
- Occupations: Film Actor; Television actor
- Spouse(s): Ingeborg Schumacher; Kati Frohriep-Szekely
- Children: Daniel; David

Signature
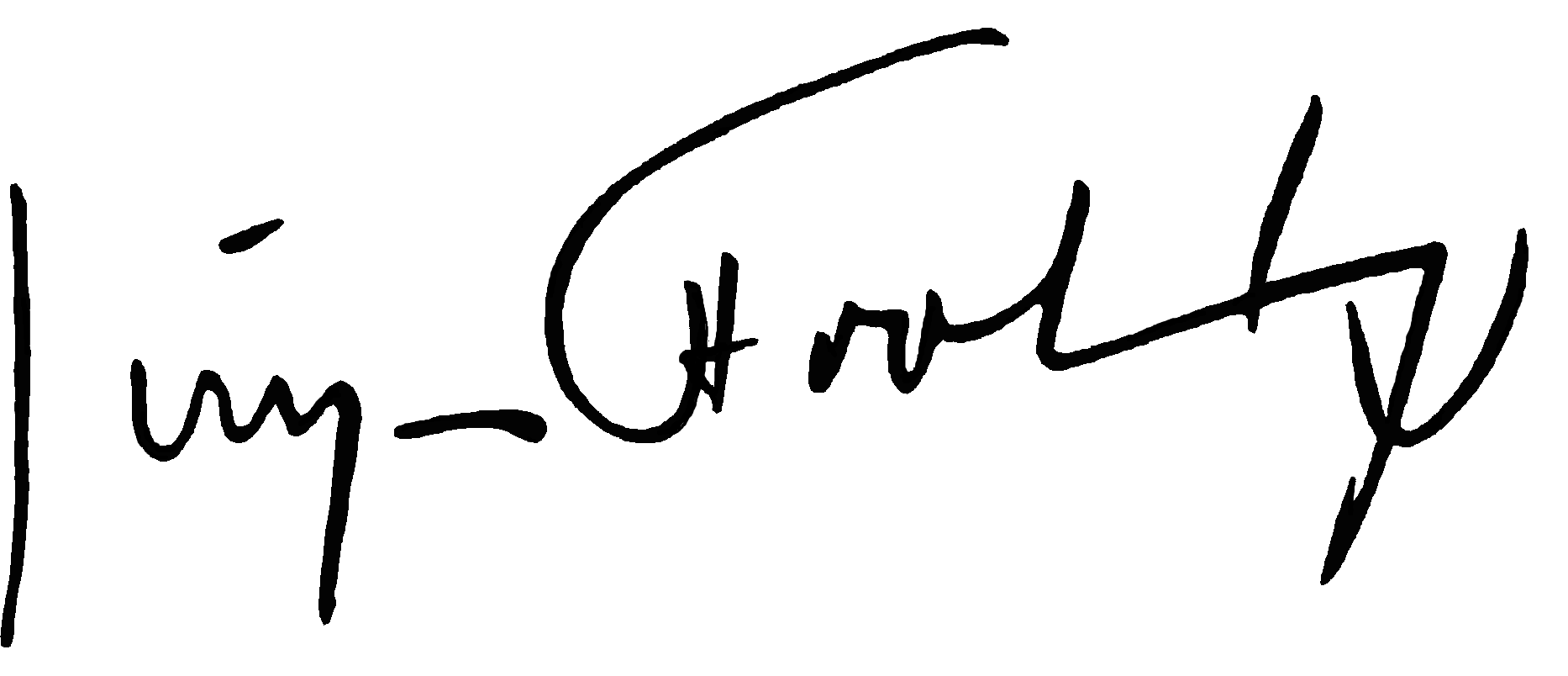

Jürgen Frohriep (28 April 1928 – 13 July 1993) was a German actor. After 1972 he became widely known for his role as Oberleutnant Jürgen Hübner in Polizeiruf 110, a long running television series that originated in the German Democratic Republic, but which continues to win large television audiences across Germany, following reunification.

Like many German actors, he also found work as a voice-over artist, dubbing English language films for domestic audiences: one of these jobs involved becoming the German language voice of Charlton Heston for his role in "Antony and Cleopatra".

His brother was the writer Ulrich Frohriep (who himself has written a handful of episodes of Polizeiruf 110).

== Life ==
Jürgen Frohriep was born in the port city of Rostock. When he was 11 the war broke out, towards the end of which he was involved in national air-defence as a "Flak helper". When the war ended, in May 1945, Frohriep, by now aged 17, found that his home city had become part of the Soviet occupation zone in what remained of Germany. His school days being behind him, he took casual work in the locally based boat and fishing industries, and in farming. Fairly early on he also became involved with the FDJ (Freie Deutsche Jugend / Free German Youth) amateur theatre movement. He never received any formal training as an actor, but was nevertheless recruited in 1951 by the Friendship Theatre (as it was then called) in Berlin. By this time the soviet occupation zone had become the German Democratic Republic (GDR), formally founded in October 1949, and after his debut at the Friendship Theatre there followed a succession of stage appearances at various theatres, including those at Stralsund, Erfurt and Altenburg, across the GDR.

At the end of the 1950s Konrad Wolf chose Frohriep for the lead role of his anti-war film, Stars (Sterne). As the brother of the country's intelligence chief, Markus Wolf, Konrad Wolf had good establishment connections, and his casting of Frohriep marked a career break-through for the latter. Frohriep became a permanent member of the DEFA, the state-owned film studio, frequently finding himself cast in soldierly roles. In Wolf Among Wolves (1965, but based on a novel written three decades earlier by Hans Fallada) he played the part of Lt. Fritz, an officer in the illicit Black Reichswehr, for which he won a "silver laurel crown" (Silber Lorbeer). In 1966 he appeared in the biographical film "No victory without a fight" ("Ohne Kampf kein Sieg"), portraying the Mercedes-Benz racing driver Manfred von Brauchitsch. Towards the end of the 1960s offers of film roles began to dry up, but in 1973 he took a supporting role in The Legend of Paul and Paula.

From 1973 Frohriep's career was focused on television. In 1972 he started to appear as Police-Oberleutnant Jürgen Hübner in the police drama series Polizeiruf 110. His character was initially rather overshadowed by Police-Captain Peter Fuchs, played by Peter Borgelt. By 1991 Jürgen Frohriep's character had nevertheless appeared in 64 episodes, which was more than any other apart from the ubiquitous Captain Fuchs himself. During this time he was also obtaining a lot of dubbing work, voicing parts in English language films for German audiences.

After the demise, as a stand-alone state, of the German Democratic Republic, Frohriep, who was 62 in 1990, stopped being offered parts. He was reported to be suffering from depression. His wife had suspended her own career as an actress to concentrate on their family when they had married some two decades earlier, but now she started to study Psychology, after which she relocated to Switzerland and opened a Psychotherapy practice in Walenstadt as Kati Székely-Frohriep. The marriage had broken up.

In a reunited Germany, the National Broadcaster, ARD decided that "Polizeiruf 110" was one of a handful of previously East German television shows that should have a future. In 1994 Frohriep returned to the series, now promoted, as Chief Commissioner Hübner for one last episode entitled "Polizeiruf 110: No love, no life". He died in Berlin a few weeks after the episode had been filmed, but before it had been transmitted.
