= Bürgschaft für ein Jahr =

1981 German drama film

- Directed by: Herrmann Zschoche
- Written by: Gabriele Kotte; Tine Schulze-Gerlach; Tamara Trampe
- Starring: Katrin Saß
- Cinematography: Günter Jaeuthe
- Edited by: Monika Schindler
- Release date: 17 September 1981
- Running time: 93 minutes
- Country: East Germany
- Language: German

Bürgschaft für ein Jahr ([ˈbʏʁkʃaft fyːɐ̯ ʔaɪn ˈjaːɐ̯], "Surety for One Year") is a 1981 East German drama film directed by Herrmann Zschoche. It was entered into the 32nd Berlin International Film Festival, where Katrin Saß won the Silver Bear for Best Actress.

== Cast ==
- Katrin Saß - Nina Kern
- Cornelia Förder - Jacqueline Kern
- Enrico Robert - René Kern
- Michaela Hotz - Mireille Kern
- Monika Lennartz - Irmgard Behrend
- Jaecki Schwarz - Peter Müller
- Jan Spitzer - Werner Horn
- Christian Steyer - Heiner Menk
- Heide Kipp - Frau Braun
- Ursula Werner - Frau Müller
- Dieter Montag - Herr Kern
- Heinz Behrens - Herr Braun
- Gerd Michael Henneberg - uncredited role
