= Weite Straßen – stille Liebe =

1969 East German film

Weite Straßen - stille Liebe
- Directed by: Herrmann Zschoche
- Starring: Manfred Krug
- Release date: 1969
- Country: East Germany
- Language: German

Weite Straßen – stille Liebe (Wide Streets – Silent Love) is an East German film. It was released in 1969.
