= Herrmann Zschoche =

German film director (1934–2026)

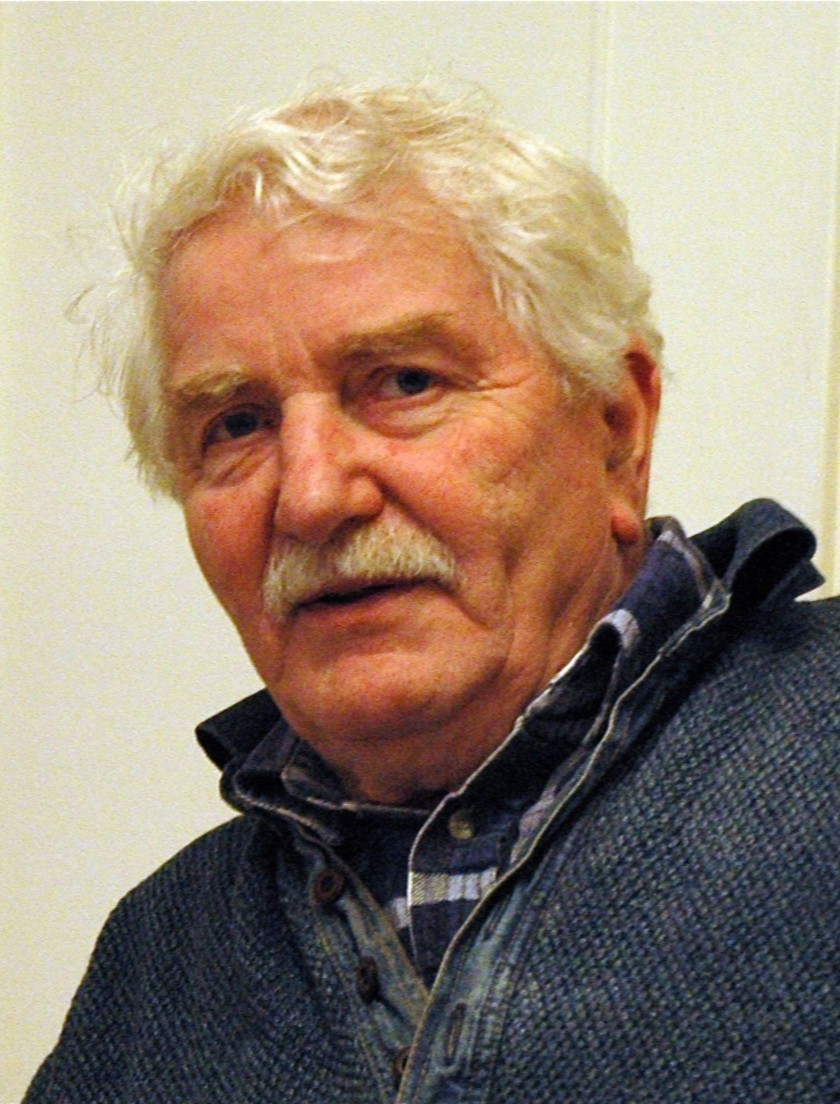
- Born: 25 November 1934; Dresden, Gau Saxony, Germany
- Died: 17 November 2026 (aged 91); Storkow, Brandenburg, Germany
- Occupations: Film director, screenwriter
- Years active: 1961–1997

Herrmann Zschoche (25 November 1934 – 17 November 2026) was a German film director and screenwriter. He directed 25 films between 1961 and 1994. His 1981 film Bürgschaft für ein Jahr was entered into the 32nd Berlin International Film Festival. Zschoche died on 17 November 2026, at the age of 91.

== Filmography ==
=== Film ===
- Das Märchenschloß (1961)
- Die Igelfreundschaft (1962)
- Lütt Matten und die weiße Muschel (1964)
- Engel im Fegefeuer (1964)
- Karla (1965, released: 1990)
- Leben zu zweit (1968)
- Weite Straßen – stille Liebe (1969)
- Eolomea (1972)
- Liebe mit 16 (1974)
- Philipp, der Kleine (1976)
- Feuer unter Deck (1977, released: 1979)
- Sieben Sommersprossen (1978)
- Glück im Hinterhaus (1980)
- Und nächstes Jahr am Balaton (1980)
- Bürgschaft für ein Jahr (1981)
- Insel der Schwäne (1983)
- Hälfte des Lebens (1985)
- Die Alleinseglerin (1987)
- Grüne Hochzeit (1989)
- The Girl in the Lift (1991)

=== Television ===
- Drei Damen vom Grill (1991, TV series, 14 episodes)
- Hier und Jetzt: Erste Begegnung (1992, TV series episode)
- Geschichten aus der Heimat (1993, TV series, 1 episode)
- Wo das Herz zu Hause ist (1994)
- Natalie – Teenage Hooker (1994)
- Tatort: Tödliche Freundschaft (1995, TV series episode)
- Inspector Rex: Masked Death (1995, TV series episode)
- Kurklinik Rosenau (1996–1997, TV series, 11 episodes)
