= Leben zu zweit =

1968 film

- Directed by: Herrmann Zschoche
- Release date: 1968
- Country: East Germany
- Language: German

Leben zu zweit is an East German comedy film. It was released in 1968.
