= Das Mädchen auf dem Brett =

1967 film

- Directed by: Kurt Maetzig
- Written by: Ralph Knebel
- Production company: Deutsche Film (DEFA)
- Distributed by: Progress Film-Verleih
- Release date: 1967
- Running time: 95 minutes
- Country: East Germany
- Language: German

Das Mädchen auf dem Brett is an East German film (translates as "The Girl on the Board"). Directed by Kurt Maetzig and written by Ralph Knebel. starring Christiane Lanzke, Klaus Piontek, Hannjo Hasse. It was released in 1967.

== Cast ==
- Christiane Lanzke - Katharina
- Klaus Piontek - Peter
- Hannjo Hasse - Klemm
- Monika Woytowicz - Claudia
- Irene Korb - Katharina's mother
- Norbert Christian - German Teacher
- Helga Göring - Chemistry Teacher
