= Angelika Waller =

German actress (born 1944)

- Born: 26 October 1944 (age 81); Bärwalde, Neumark, Germany
- Occupation: Actress
- Years active: 1962-present

Angelika Waller (born 26 October 1944) is a German actress. She appeared in more than fifty films since 1962. Her first leading role was in the 1965 film The Rabbit Is Me, a film which was banned in East Germany and released only in 1989.

== Filmography ==
| Year | Title | Role | Notes |
|---|---|---|---|
| 1965 | The Rabbit Is Me | Maria Morzek | |
| 1971 | Liberation | Eva Braun | |
