= Polizeiruf 110 =

German detective television series

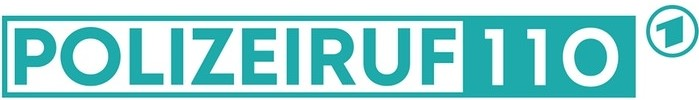
- Current logo used since 2019
- Genre: Crime drama
- Countries of origin: East Germany (1971–1990); Germany (1990–present)
- Original language: German
- No. of episodes: 421

Production
- Running time: 90 Minutes

Original release
- Network: DFF (1971–1990); ARD (1990–present)
- Release: 1971

Polizeiruf 110 ("Police call 110") is a long-running German-language detective television series. The name refers to the emergency telephone number of the Volkspolizei. The first episode was broadcast 27 June 1971 in the German Democratic Republic (GDR), and after the dissolution of Deutscher Fernsehfunk the series was picked up by ARD. It was originally created as a counterpart to the West German series Tatort and quickly became a public favorite.

In contrast to Tatort, which primarily focuses on homicides, the cases handled in the GDR TV's Polizeiruf 110 were more often crimes such as domestic violence, extortion, fraud, theft and juvenile delinquency, as well as alcoholism, child abuse and rape. Polizeiruf 110 followed a stricter police procedural format than Tatort, paying particular attention to the criminal's state of mind and the social context of the crime. Many episodes sought to promote particular social values.

In 1990 the episode "Unter Brüdern" was produced as a crossover with the West German Tatort crime series, in which Horst Schimanski coworked with Hauptmann Peter Fuchs and Oberleutnant Thomas Grawe in a case of homicide and smuggling committed by former members of the Stasi.

After the end of the GDR, the series was taken over by the ARD as a franchise similar to the Tatort series. The local members of the ARD produce their own episodes, which are aired by the ARD. West German settings and characters came into the show. Parallel to the Tatort series, the ORF joined the Polizeiruf franchise with its own productions. Consequently, those episodes are renamed Polizeiruf 133 because of the different emergency telephone number in Austria, while the West German emergency call uses the same number as the East German. The ARD's Polizeiruf deals mostly with murders and homicides, while the focus has been more on entertainment rather than any teaching or enlightening. More emphasis was put on the characters and personal lives of the detectives, and there has been relatively little difference overall between the newer Polizeiruf episodes and the contemporary Tatort episodes. However, Polizeiruf continues to feature more (post-reunification) East German settings than in Tatort.

A 1974 episode based on the case of serial killer Erwin Hagedorn was banned by the politburo, which feared an uncomfortable public debate about the death penalty. A script and silent tape of the episode, thought lost, were rediscovered in 2009, and the sound was re-dubbed for broadcast with new actors (the episode was aired 23 June 2011 by Mitteldeutscher Rundfunk [MDR]).

In 2014, the series was broadcast with English subtitles in the USA on MHz WorldView under the title Bukow and König (2010–2014 episodes). The series was also broadcast in Austria as Polizeiruf 133, because 110 is not used as an emergency telephone number in Austria.

On 2 November 2021, Deutsche Post AG released a commemorative postage stamp to celebrate the 50th anniversary of Polizeiruf 110.

== Prominent cast members ==
- Peter Borgelt as Hauptmann, later Kriminalhauptkommissar Peter Fuchs (84 episodes, 1971–1991)
- Jürgen Frohriep as Oberleutnant, later Kriminaloberkommissar Jürgen Hübner (68 episodes, 1972–1994)
- Sigrid Göhler as Leutnant Vera Arndt (49 episodes, 1971–2001)
- Wolfgang Winkler as Hauptkommissar Herbert Schneider (50 episodes, 1979–2013)
- Andreas Schmidt-Schaller as Leutnant, Oberleutnant, later Kriminaloberkommissar Thomas Grawe (40 episodes, 1973–2004)
- Jaecki Schwarz as Hauptkommissar Herbert Schmücke (together with Schneider) (38 episodes, 1987–2007)
- Horst Krause Polizeihauptmeister Krause (35 episodes, 1987–2015)
- Lutz Riemann as Oberleutnant, later Kriminaloberkommissar Lutz Zimmermann (25 episodes, 1983–1991)
- Edgar Selge as Kriminalhauptkommissar Jürgen Tauber (21 episodes, 1998–2009)
- Günter Naumann as Kriminalhauptkommissar Günter Beck (21 episodes, 1973–2001)
- Michaela May as Kriminalhauptkommissarin Jo Obermaier (17 episodes, 2001–2009)
- Imogen Kogge as Hauptkommissarin Johanna Herz (12 episodes, 2002–2010)
- Henry Hübchen as Tobias Törner (5 episodes, 2003–2005)
