= Kurt Maetzig =

German film director

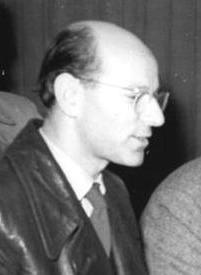
- Maetzig at a screening of the film Ernst Thälmann – Führer seiner Klasse in 1955.
- Born: 25 January 1911; Berlin, German Empire
- Died: 8 August 2012 (aged 101); Wildkuhl, Mecklenburg, Germany
- Occupation: Film director

Kurt Maetzig (25 January 1911 – 8 August 2012) was a German film director who had a significant effect on the film industry in East Germany. He was one of the most respected filmmakers of the GDR. After his retirement he lived in Wildkuhl, Mecklenburg, and had three children.

== Early life ==
Kurt Maetzig was the son of Robert Maetzig and Marie Maetzig (née Lyon). He was born and grew up in the Charlottenburg borough of Berlin. His mother came from a wealthy family of tea merchants. He gained an insight into the film industry from an early age as his father was the proprietor of a factory that produced film copies there. During the First World War, he stayed with his grandmother in Hamburg. After the end of the war, he moved back to Berlin, where he completed his secondary education at the Leibniz-Oberrealschule. He then enrolled at the Technical University of Munich (TUM), where he studied chemistry, engineering and political and business economics. He also studied sociology, psychology and law for a year at the Sorbonne in Paris.

In the late 1920s, Maetzig worked at his father's factory during the holidays, gaining experience in all areas of film production. He began shooting his own films in 1932, and three years later he ran his own cartoon workshop, where he also worked on titles and opening credits for short films.

== Career ==
He received his PhD from TUM in 1935 after he had completed his dissertation entitled "The accountancy of a film-copying institution." He then worked for various firms, including his father's, where he worked on film technology and photochemistry, and also gave lessons on copying techniques and problems with sound and colour in films. However, following the Nuremberg Laws of 1935, his work permit was revoked by the Film Chamber of the Reich in 1937 due to his mother's Jewish heritage. Maetzig then ran a small photochemical laboratory in Berlin and gave lectures on film technology.

During the Second World War, Maetzig became a member of the illegal Communist Party in 1944. After the war, he moved back to Berlin, where he co-founded a group called "Filmaktiv" in 1945, whose aim was to organise a resumption of film production. He joined the newly founded state-owned film studio, DEFA, in 1947, where he worked as a director both of documentaries and feature films. He became DEFA's artistic director in 1946. He was also the first director and editor of the weekly newsreel "Der Augenzeuge" (English: The Eyewitness).

Maetzig's first feature film was Ehe im Schatten (Marriage in the Shadows), released in 1947. It was the most successful film of the post-war period, attracting over 12 million viewers in total. His other notable films include Die Buntkarierten (1949), which was entered into the Cannes Film Festival, the Ernst Thälmann films (1954–55), and the science fiction film Der schweigende Stern (1960). Some of Maetzig's work has been described as East German propaganda particularly his two part series on Ernst Thalman (Ernst Thälmann - Sohn seiner Klasse, Ernst Thälmann - Führer seiner Klasse), though nearly all his films in production from 1965–66 were banned by East German authorities. He also directed the film Das Kaninchen bin ich (The Rabbit is Me) (1965), which was one of twelve films that were banned in East Germany after the 11th plenum of the SED's Central Committee for being too critical of the internal social problems within the country.

He retired as a film director in 1976. He died on 8 August 2012 in Wildkuhl, Mecklenburg.

== Other commitments ==
From 1954 to 1964, Maetzig was the first president of the German University of Cinema in Potsdam-Babelsberg, where he also held the post of Professor of Stage Direction. From 1967 to 1988 he was an executive member of the Verband der Film- und Fernsehschaffenden der DDR (GDR Federation of Film and Television Producers). He then became the vice-president of the Fédération Internationale des Ciné-Clubs (International Federation of Cinema Clubs) (FICC) in 1974.

He was also president of the Nationales Spielfilmfestival der DDR (English: GDR National Film Festival) on four separate occasions between 1980 and 1990, and he has been a member of the Academy of Arts, Berlin since 1950, where a considerable archive of his works is located. In 1973 he was a member of the jury at the 8th Moscow International Film Festival. In 1979 he was a member of the jury at the 11th Moscow International Film Festival. In 1983 he was a member of the jury at the 33rd Berlin International Film Festival.

== Filmography ==
- 1946: Der Augenzeuge (weekly newsreel)
- 1946: Berlin im Aufbau (documentary)
- 1946: Musikalischer Besuch (documentary)
- 1946: 1.Mai 1946 (documentary)
- 1946: Leipziger Messe 1946 (documentary)
- 1946: Einheit SPD – KPD (documentary)
- 1947: Marriage in the Shadows
- 1949: Girls in Gingham
- 1950: The Council of the Gods
- 1950: Immer bereit (documentary)
- 1950: The Benthin Family (co-directors: Slatan Dudow, Richard Groschopp)
- 1951: The Sonnenbrucks
- 1952: Story of a Young Couple
- 1954: Ernst Thälmann - Sohn seiner Klasse
- 1955: Ernst Thälmann - Führer seiner Klasse
- 1957: Castles and Cottages
- 1957: Don't Forget My Little Traudel
- 1958: The Sailor's Song
- 1960: First Spaceship on Venus
- 1961: September Love
- 1961: Der Traum des Hauptmann Loy
- 1961: Der Schatten
- 1963: An französischen Kaminen
- 1964: Preludio 11
- 1965: The Rabbit Is Me
- 1967: Das Mädchen auf dem Brett
- 1967: The Banner of Krivoi Rog
- 1970: Aus unserer Zeit
- 1972: Januskopf
- 1976: Mann gegen Mann

== Awards ==
- 1949 Bambi (prize) for Ehe im Schatten
- 1949 National Preis II. Klasse for Ehe im Schatten and Die Buntkarierten (with others)
- 1950 National Preis I. Klasse for Der Rat der Götter (with others)
- 1954 National Preis I. Klasse for Ernst Thälmann - Sohn seiner Klasse (with others)
- 1959 National Preis II. Klasse for Das Lied der Matrosen (with others)
- 1961 Vaterländischer Verdienstorden in Silver
- 1968 National Preis I. Klasse for Die Fahne von Kriwoj Rog (with others)
- 1986 Findling Award for his life's work
- 1986 Vaterländischer Verdienstorden in Gold
