= Marriage in the Shadows =

1947 East German film

Ehe im Schatten
- Directed by: Kurt Maetzig
- Written by: Hans Scweikart; Kurt Maetzig
- Produced by: Georg Kiaup
- Starring: Paul Klinger; Ilse Steppat; Alfred Balthoff
- Cinematography: Friedl Behn-Grund; Eugen Klagemann
- Edited by: Alice Ludwig
- Music by: Wolfgang Zeller
- Production company: DEFA
- Distributed by: Sovexport-Film
- Release date: 3 October 1947 (Berlin)
- Running time: 104 minutes
- Country: Soviet Occupation Zone
- Language: German

Marriage in the Shadows (German: Ehe im Schatten) is 1947 German melodrama film directed by Kurt Maetzig and starring Paul Klinger, Ilse Steppat and Alfred Balthoff. It was produced in the Soviet zone in what later became East Germany and was released by DEFA. The film was described as an "attempt to confront the German people about the morals of the past", being the first film to confront the people about the persecution of the Jews and the atrocities conducted during World War II.

== Plot ==
Actor Hans Wieland refuses to divorce his actress wife, Elisabeth Maurer, who is Jewish, even as extreme pressure is applied on him by the Nazi authorities. He even takes her to a premiere of one of his films where she is unwittingly introduced to a high Nazi Party official. Upon later discovering that the charming woman at the premiere was in fact Jewish, he orders her arrest. Hans Wieland is given an ultimatum by his former friend Herbert Blohm, now a Nazi official at the Reichskulturministerium (culture ministry), to save himself by divorcing his wife. Knowing that his wife will die in a concentration camp, Hans Wieland returns home and they drink poison in coffee whilst reciting the closing scene of Friedrich Schiller's tragic play Die Jungfrau von Orleans together.

The film ends with a dedication to the real-life actor Joachim Gottschalk who committed suicide with his Jewish wife Meta Wolff and their nine-year-old son Michael.

== Cast ==
- Paul Klinger as Hans Wieland
- Ilse Steppat as Elisabeth
- Alfred Balthoff as Kurt Bernstein
- Claus Holm as Dr. Herbert Blohm
- Hans Leibelt as Fehrenbach
- Karl Hellmer as Gallenkamp
- Hilde von Stolz as Greta Koch
- Walter Werner as Mr. Hofbauer
- Karl Hannemann as Gestapo agent
- Elly Burgmer as aunt Olga
- Lothar Firmans as state secretary

== Production ==
The screenplay was based on the life and suicide of actor Joachim Gottschalk and his family in 1941. However, Kurt Maetzig said of the film, "almost everything in the film is based on what I myself, or my family and friends, have experienced." Indeed, the character of Kurt Bernstein, portrayed by Alfred Balthoff, is strongly based on Maetzig. Maetzig's mother had committed suicide to avoid being caught by the Gestapo. It is Kurt Maetzig's first feature film as director.

The film was shot at the Johannisthal Studios in Berlin and on location around the city. The film's sets were designed by the art directors Otto Erdmann and Kurt Herlth.

== Reception ==
Ehe im Schatten was the only film to be released simultaneously in all the sectors of occupied Berlin, on 3 October 1947, becoming the most successful film produced in the first post-war years and is widely considered one of the best German films of this period. The picture sold 12,888,153 tickets.

Maetzig and cinematographer Friedl Behn-Grund received the National Prize of East Germany Second Class for their work. The director was also awarded the first ever Bambi Prize, in 1948.
