= Progress Film =

German film company

- Website: www.PROGRESS.film

Progress Film is a German film distributor. It was established in 1950 to handle the release of films produced by DEFA, the state-controlled production outfit of communist East Germany. Since 1989 Progress distributes the entire DEFA film collection.

Since 2019, Progress has been digitizing and making accessible the complete holdings of DEFA as well as a growing number of international collections by other archives which are being made available to the public on a historically curated platform.

== History ==
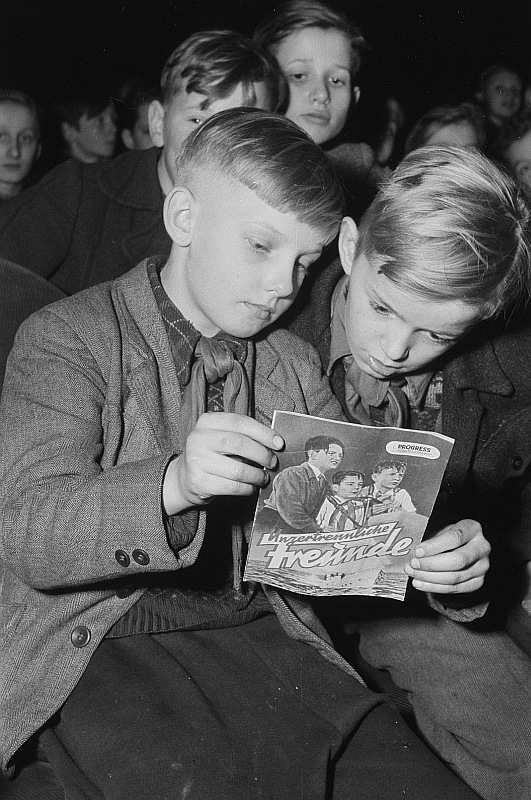
The Progress programme at the premiere of the film Unzertrennliche Freunde in the Leipzig Cinema Capitol on 12 December 1953.

Progress was founded on 1 August 1950 as a German–Soviet company. Like DEFA, Progress Film was a monopoly company, and its films were carefully vetted by the regime for their content. Progress took over this role in the early 1950s from Sovexport, a Soviet-controlled company which operated during the period following the Battle of Berlin in 1945 and the Allied Occupation of Germany. Rudolf Bernstein and Georgri Nikolayevich Nikolayev, later director of Soviet film production Lenfilm, were appointed German and Soviet directors.

Progress was the only film distributor in the German Democratic Republic. The repertoire includes more than 12,000 films from nine decades. Almost half of them were feature films and documentaries by DEFA, the only film studio in the GDR: Progress also brought films by famous international directors to GDR cinemas. Among them were Sergei Eisenstein (f. e. Battleship Potemkin), Andrei Tarkovsky (f. e. Solaris), Federico Fellini (La Strada), Luchino Visconti (f. e. Death in Venice), Ingmar Bergman (Wild Strawberries) and Sergio Leone (Once Upon a Time in the West).

After the fall of the Berlin Wall in 1989, Progress—on behalf of the DEFA Foundation—began marketing the entire collection of films that show a now non-existent country. Other collections from the 20th century were added. Many of the former East German films were re-released and became cult classics.

In 2019, Progress was acquired as Progress Film GmbH by LOOKSfilm, based in Halle. Since 1 April 2019, the entire film heritage of the GDR has been made internationally accessible on the platform Progress.film. In addition, Progress evaluates film materials from ministries, parties and authorities as well as other collections on behalf of the federal government. Thus, an increasing number of archive collections are made available to the public on PROGRESS.film.

== Collections ==
In total, Progress's holdings include 20,000 films and recordings from around the world, from the beginning of the 20th century to the present (as of January 2021).

PROGRESS' logo, 1979–1990

Collection	Number of films	Production period
DEFA productions
DEFA cartoons and animated films	approx. 950	1955–1992
DEFA documentaries	approx. 2,100	1946–1992
DEFA Movies	approx. 700	1946–1992
DEFA newsreel Der Augenzeuge	approx. 2,000	1946–1980
Video archives
Blickpunkt	approx. 180	1990-2005
Cintec	approx. 1,500	1985-2005
Wydoks	approx. 60	1990–1992
The Contemporary Witness Archive Thomas Grimm	approx. 1,600	1989-2009
Cinecentrum
Newsreel Blick in die Welt	approx. 2,000	1945–1986
Ukrainian Archives
Ukrainian State Archives	approx. 180	1917-1930
Historiathek
US Archives	approx. 900	1905–1992

== Bibliography ==
- Sebastian Heiduschke. East German Cinema: DEFA and Film History. Springer 2013
