= Birthe Wolter =

German actress (born 1981)

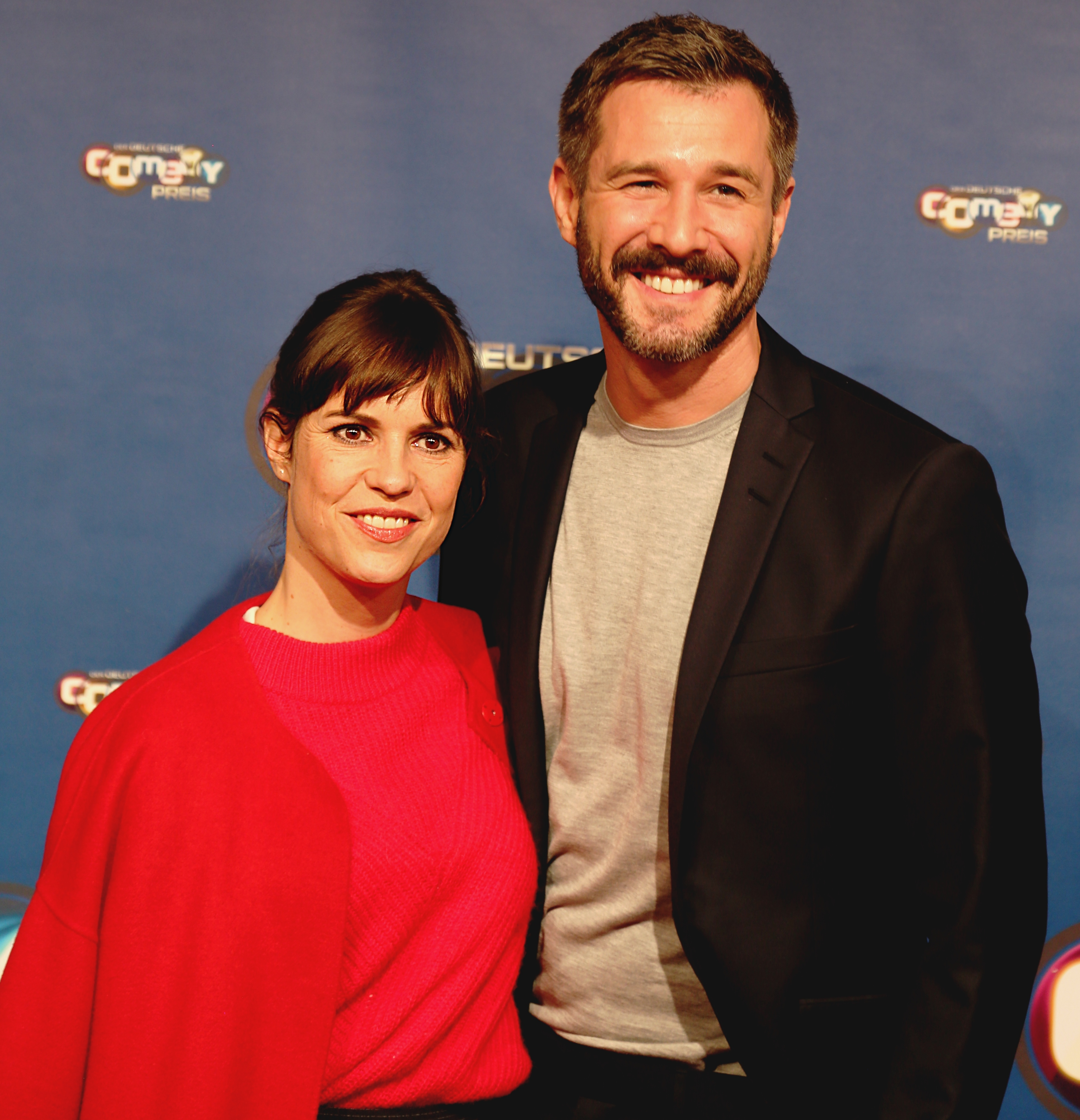
- Birthe Wolter and Jochen Schropp (2017)
- Born: 4 October 1981 (age 43); Cologne, West Germany

Birthe Wolter (born 4 October 1981) is a German actress.

== Career ==
She studied at the Munich's August Everding Music and Drama School (2002–2006). Her most popular role so far was one of the leading role in the RTL series Schulmädchen. She also took part in the later ProSieben series Alles außer Sex with Simone Hanselmann, another school girl in Schulmädchen.

Besides her roles in television, she is also a famous movie and theatre actress.

== Filmography / theatre ==
=== Series ===
- 1996: SK-Babies
- 1999: Ein starkes Team
- 1999: CityExpress
- 1999–2002: Ein Fall für zwei
- 2000: Nesthocker – Familie zu verschenken
- 2000: Die Motorrad-Cops – Hart am Limit
- 2000: Großstadtrevier
- 2000: Mordkommission
- 2001: Polizeiruf 110
- 2005: Die Wache
- 2004-2005: Schulmädchen
- 2007: Alles außer Sex

=== Telefilms ===
- 1997: Kleine Einbrecher (main role)
- 1998: Tatort – Bildersturm
- 1999: Craniumfraktur (shortfilm in London International Filmschool, main role)
- 2000: Der Superbulle und die Halbstarken (supporting role)
- 2001: Ich pfeif' auf schöne Männer (supporting role)
- 2008: Tatort – In eigener Sache

=== Cinema ===
- 2000: Flashback (supporting role)
- 2002: FearDotCom (supporting role)
- 2002: Letzte Bahn (main role)
- 2003: Das Wunder von Bern (supporting role)
- 2008: Virus Undead (main role)
- 2008: Close to You (supporting role)

=== Theatre ===
- 2004: Die Unbekannte aus der Seine (supporting role) Akademiebühne München
- 2005: Hamlet oder nicht Hamlet, das ist hier die Frage (supporting role) Akademiebühne München
- 2005: Der Golem (supporting role) Metropol Thetaer München
- 2005 - 2006: Genua 01 (main role) Resident Theater München
