= Lara-Isabelle Rentinck =

German actress

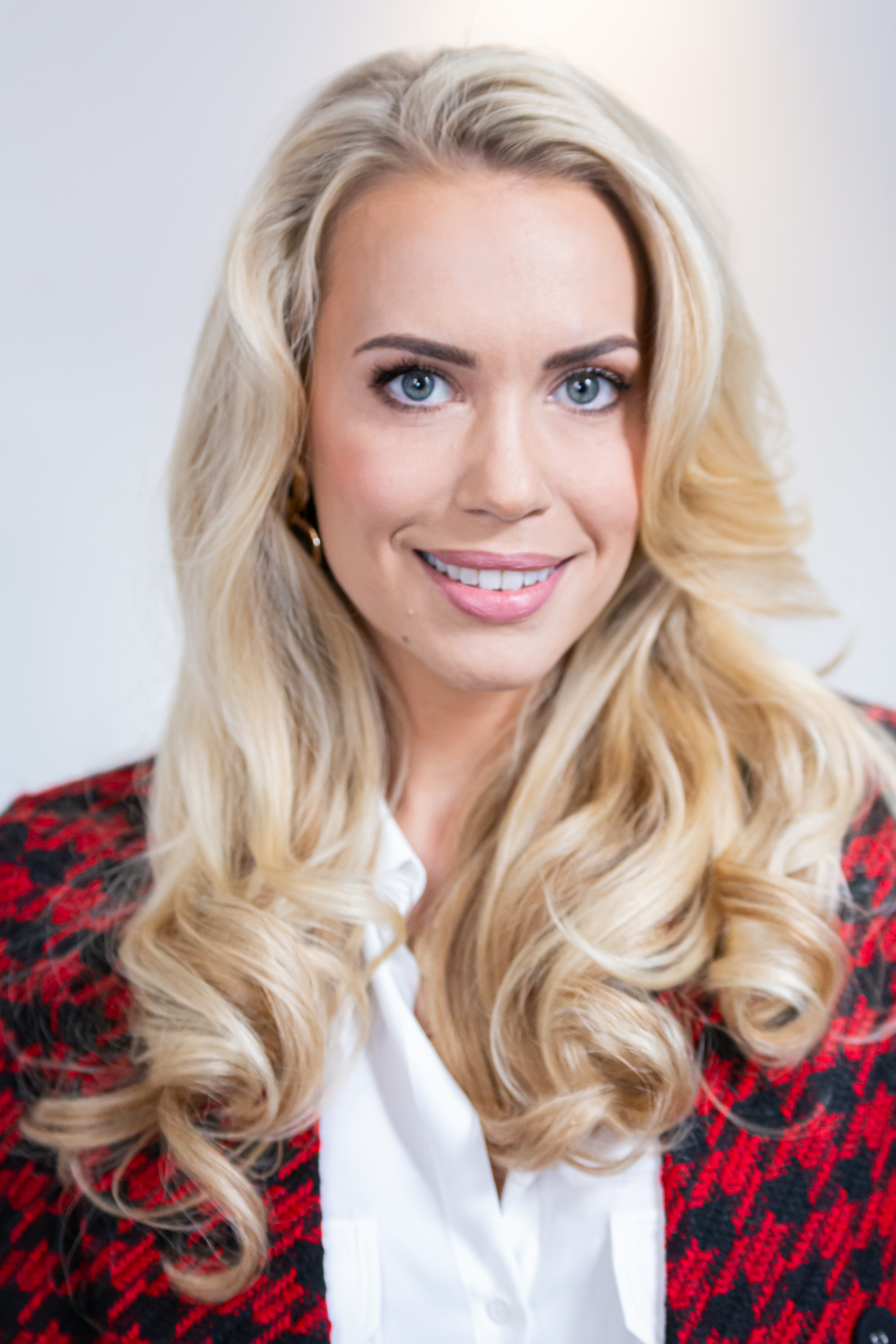
- Lara-Isabelle Rentinck 2018
- Born: 18 August 1986 (age 40); East Berlin, East Germany
- Occupations: actress and model
- Years active: 2005–present

Lara-Isabelle Rentinck (born 18 August 1986 in East Berlin) is a German film and television actress and model.

== Biography ==
While still at school Rentnick had private acting and singing lessons and took part in a Camera-Acting-Workshop mfa. At the age of 15 she completed a traineeship at the Comödie Dresden.

In 2006 she participated with Manuel Cortez in the "Shakespeare Projekt" (as Julia resp. Romeo) producing an audio-CD with ballads after William Shakespeare.

From November 2007 Rentinck played besides Ulrike Mai at the Komödie Dresden the main character in Ferienheim Bergkristall – Gäste, Gauner und Gespenster.

In August 2016 she posed for the Playboy magazine.

== Filmography ==
=== Cinema ===
- Jerry Cotton (2009)
- EQ Emotionale Intelligenz (2008-2009)
- Mord ist mein Geschäft, Liebling (2007)
- 24berlin (2004)

=== TV ===
- Verliebt in Berlin (2005-2007)
- Verliebt in Berlin – Das Ja-Wort (2006)
- Die Geschichte Mitteldeutschlands – Glück ohne Ruh' – Goethe und die Liebe (2008)
- Die 25. Stunde – Feuerteufel (2008)
- SOKO 5113 – Flüchtige Liebe (2009)
- Hallo Robbie! – Altlasten (2009)
- Der Landarzt – Intrige mit Folgen (2009)
- Mord ist mein Geschäft, Liebling (2009)
- Barbara Wood – Karibisches Geheimnis (2009)
- Notruf Hafenkante – Falsche Töne (2009)
- Killerjagd. Töte mich, wenn du kannst (2009)
- Marienhof (2011)
- Küstenwache (2011-2016)
- Der letzte Bulle – Zur Kasse, Schätzchen (2012)
- Kripo Holstein – Mord und Meer (2013)
- Akte EX - Zum Sterben Schön (2014)
- Die Rosenheim-Cops – In Schönheit sterben (2015)
- Letzte Spur Berlin - Unantastbar (2016)

== Theater appearances ==
- Kamasutra will gelernt sein (as Sybille Lohmeier, 2009, Komödie Dresden)
- Ferienheim Bergkristall - Gäste, Gauner und Gespenster (as Kitty Bang, 2007-2008, Komödie Dresden)

== Awards ==
Deutscher Fernsehpreis (2005) and Golden Rose of Lucerne (2006) as part of the TV series Verliebt in Berlin in the category Beste tägliche Serie.
