= Rhea Harder =

German actress (born 1976)

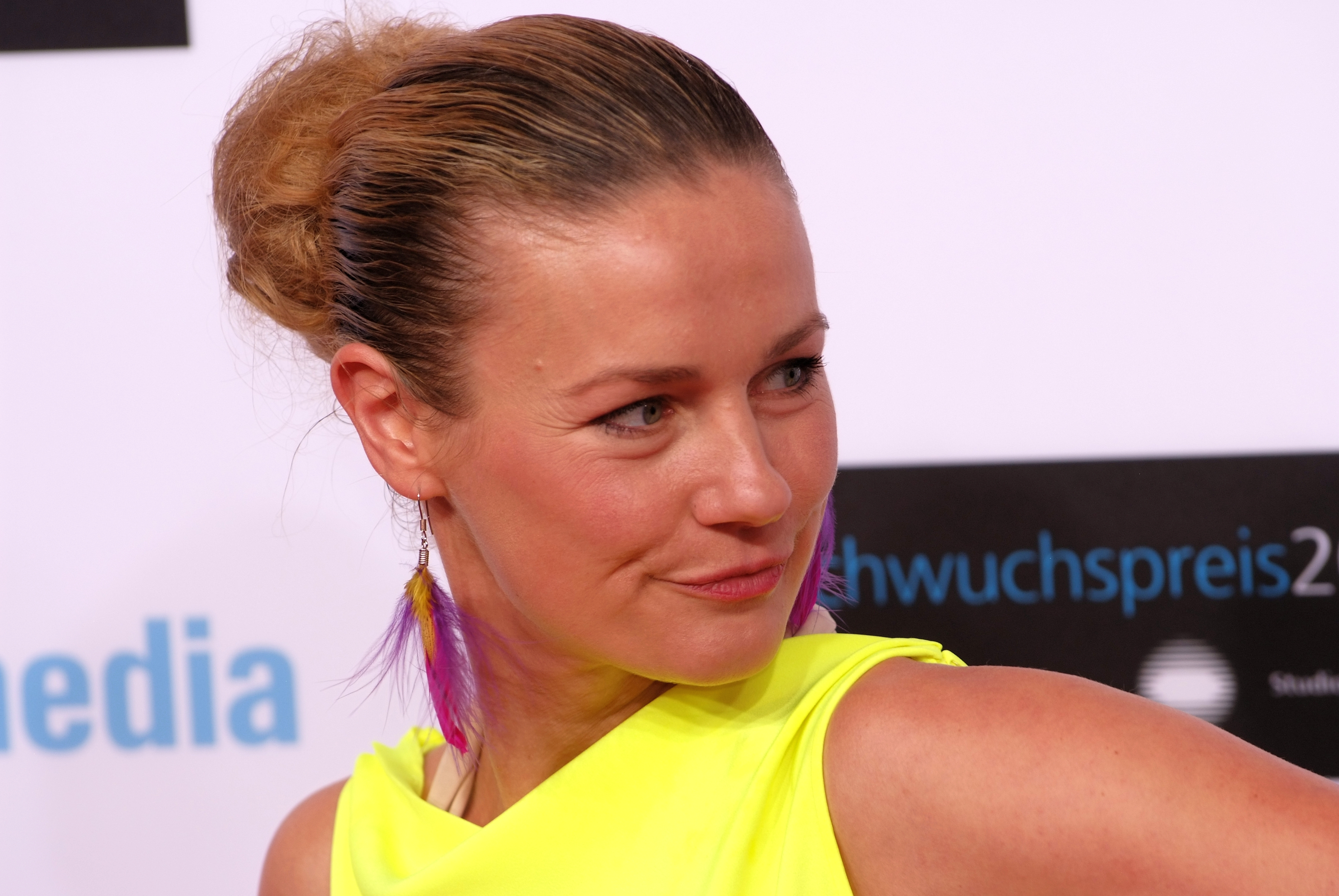
- Harder in 2012
- Born: 27 February 1976 (age 49); East Berlin, East Germany
- Occupation: Actress
- Years active: 1994–present
- Known for: Gute Zeiten, schlechte Zeiten
- Partner: Jörg Vennewald
- Children: 3
- Website: www.rhea-harder.de

Rhea Harder (born 27 February 1976 in East Berlin) is a German actress, best known for appearances in various German television series.

== Early life ==
Harder was born in East Berlin and grew up in East Germany, completing her abitur. She then sat tests for the civil service in Berlin before being cast in Gute Zeiten, schlechte Zeiten and deciding on a career as actress.

== Career ==
Harder played the role of Florentine 'Flo Spira' Spirandelli di Montalban in the television series Gute Zeiten, schlechte Zeiten from 1996 to 2002.

She played the role of Sarah Hermann in Berlin, Berlin from 2003 to 2005, and the role of Valerie Kopp in Alles außer Sex from 2005 to 2007.

She has been playing the role of police officer Franziska 'Franzi' Jung in the series Notruf Hafenkante since 2006.

Following the death in 2009 of Veronika Neugebauer, Harder took over the role of Gaby Glockner in the audio drama series TKKG.

== Personal life ==
Harder's first son Moritz Paul Harder was born in 2004 and appeared as baby Ben in the series Berlin, Berlin in 2005. Her second son, Bruno Franz, was born in 2010. In June 2013 she married her longtime boyfriend Jörg Vennewald and in 2014 she gave birth to their daughter. The family lives in Hamburg.

== Filmography ==
=== Films ===
- 2000: Flashback

=== TV series ===
- 1994: Frauenarzt Dr. Markus Merthin
- 1995: Die Straßen von Berlin
- 1995–1996: Für alle Fälle Stefanie
- 1995–2002: Gute Zeiten, schlechte Zeiten als Florentine 'Flo Spira' Spirandelli di Montalban
- 2000: Küstenwache – Jetski-Rowdies
- 2001: Balko – Die Nervensäge
- 2002: Leipzig Homicide – Verliebt in einen Lehrer
- 2002: Küstenwache – Skrupellos
- 2002/2003: Für alle Fälle Stefanie
- 2003–2005: Berlin, Berlin as Sarah Hermann
- 2005: Küstenwache – Verloren in der Tiefe
- 2005–2007: Alles außer Sex as Valerie Kopp
- 2006–2022: Notruf Hafenkante as Polizeiobermeisterin Franziska "Franzi" Jung
- 2008: SOKO Wismar – Tödliches Gebräu

=== Audio dramas ===
- Die drei ??? - Spuk Im Netz (Folge 132, Voice of Felica Sparing)
- TKKG - Das Mädchen mit der Kristallkugel (Folge 166, Voice of Maren)
- TKKG - Voice of Gaby Glockner (seit Folge 167)
- Fünf Freunde - Fünf Freunde und das Abenteuer im Hundeschlitten (Folge 83, Voice of Eva Moser)
- Die drei ??? - Der DreiTag
