= Voosen =

Voosen and Vosen are German patronymic surnames derived from the given name Voss/Voß or Vos, based on the nickname "Voss" , 'fox'. Notable people with the surname include:

- Jana Voosen (born 1976), German actress
