= Marienhof (TV series) =

German television soap opera

- Genre: Soap opera
- Created by: Simon Müller-Elmau
- Starring: Viktoria Brams; Wolfgang Seidenberg; Sven Thiemann
- Music by: Tobi Hang, Didi Holesch, Andreas Schmidt-Hoensdorf
- Opening theme: SOS/Kismet - "Es wird viel passiern"
- Country of origin: Germany
- Original language: German
- No. of episodes: 4,053

Production
- Running time: 25 minutes

Original release
- Network: Das Erste
- Release: 1 October 1992 – 15 June 2011

Marienhof is a German soap opera, first shown on 1 October 1992 on German TV channel, Das Erste. It started as a weekly series, before becoming a daily programme on 2 January 1995. The show was cancelled in February 2011 and aired its last episode on 15 June 2011.

The show focuses on the everyday life of the residents of the Marienhof, a fictional suburb in Cologne. Over the years, the show became known for tackling several social issues, such as homosexuality, homelessness, private bankruptcy, rape, drug abuse, AIDS, child abuse, suicide, cancer, adultery and murder.

== Background ==
Marienhof is produced by Bavaria Fernsehproduktion GmbH in Munich. The series is set in another German city, Cologne. The first 52 episodes of the show were 45 minutes long and were shown every Tuesday and Thursday but from episode 53 onwards, this was shortened to 25 minutes. On 2 January 1995, Marienhof was joined by Verbotene Liebe in the daily soaps schedule in Germany.

The show has produced 4,053 episodes and has starred 100 major actors, 4,000 minor actors and about 5,000 guest stars. Of the many roles in the series, Inge Busch, played by Viktoria Brams, was the only one from the beginning to the end. In the show, there have been 25 weddings, 48 deaths and 13 births. The theme tune of Marienhof is the song "Es wird viel passieren" by S.O.S.

== Setting ==
Marienhof is set in a fictional Cologne suburb, with businesses and shops like any normal suburb. Settings include a shopping mall, cafes, a secondary school, a discotheque and the houses of the different characters. The characters of the soap were bar and shop owners, housewives, businessmen, craftsmen, doctors, students and teachers.

Overall, the plot - in contrast to the plot of another German soap opera Verbotene Liebe - was dominated by the petite bourgeoisie instead of the wealthy nobility, similar to the other well-known day-time German soaps like Unter Uns and Gute Zeiten, schlechte Zeiten.

According to Günter Struve, program director of Das Erste between 1992 and 2008:

“Marienhof is familiar without being too fuddy-duddy, and close to everyday life without being boring - every day more than three million, mostly young, viewers are guests in the Cologne district. The stories in Marienhof are written off from life, credibility is their greatest strength. We will keep this piece of modern television home for the audience for as long as desired."

— Günter Struve

== Production ==
=== Concept and initial framework proposals ===
In April 1989, the Bavaria Film / Film West working group, headed by Georg Feil, presented a first paper in which the series, which did not yet have an independent working title, was presented. Accordingly, a classic 25-minute soap with stories and events from private and work life was planned, which, however, was not copied from foreign formats - as was the case with Lindenstraße and later in Gute Zeiten, schlechte Zeiten, but rather from German authors should be written. The series envisaged three narrative strands interwoven like a braid based on the Anglo-Saxon model, i. H. Three independent stories should be told per episode, which nonetheless have points of contact.

A script editor and two teams of five authors should ensure that this concept is adhered to. The working group initially developed three suggestions for locations: the clover leaf, the department store and the hospital in the middle of the city. After the series paper had been processed, the materials clover leaf and hospital were discarded; what remained was a suggestion for the department store, which was presented to the ARD cross-country series project group in May 1989. After almost all editors had voted for a further development of the department store material, extensive research was carried out on cross-country productions in other European countries. In July, another revised paper for the series was presented with explanations of the dramaturgical concept and the planned manuscript production, in which the department store material was expanded and rounded off. Ultimately, however, the Arnhem department store was rejected by the ARD project group, as it was feared that this location would not offer enough scope for private stories and human fates, which is why all previous suggestions for characters were rejected.

== Cast ==
=== Main cast members ===
Actor	Role	Episodes	Years
Stefan Maaß	Marco Busch #1	1–150	1992–1994
Joachim Rebscher	Rainer Effenberg	1–101	1992–1994
Anke Sevenich	Gerti Effenberg, née von Tronsberg	1–101	1992–1994
Viktoria Brams	Inge Busch, née Kranz	1–4053	1992–2011
Wilm Roil	Manfred Busch	1–144	1992–1994
Mona Seefried	Ortrud Winkelmann	1–933	1992–1998
Marc Jung (Ep. 1–1023); Marian Jung (Ep. 1–128)	Thomas "Tom" Winkelmann	1–128; 189–605; 812–1023	1992–1994; 1995–1996; 1997–1998
Marianne Lindner	Rosa Sievenich †	1–110	1992–1994
Alexandra Henkel	Lisa Busch #1	1–258; 657–672	1992–1995; 1997
Eckhard Preuß	Uwe Baumann	1–122	1992–1994
Ulrike Mai	Hilde Poppel, née Möhlmann #1	1–178	1992–1995
Claus-Dieter Reents †	Heinz Poppel †	1–599 († 698)	1992–1996 (1997)
Rolf Illig †	Karl Sievenich	1–250; 392–425	1992–1995; 1995–1996
Peter E. Funck	Hendrik Woldemar "H.W." Jensen †	1–131	1992–1994
Günter Spörrle	Willi H.M.E. ("Hol mal eben")	1–52	1992–1993
Gisela Rening	Hermine Pritzwalk	1–50	1992–1993
Friedrich Theuring †	Wilhelm "Willem" Kranz	2–366	1992–1995
Wolfram Mucha	Kurt Schneider †	2–61	1992–1993
Wolfgang Wolter †	Wolfgang Wagner	2–490	1992–1996
Sabine Bohlmann	Jennifer "Jenny" Deile, née Wagner	2–690; 1542–2415	1992–1997; 2000–2004
Günter Naumann †	Ludwig "Louis" Gessner †	3–231	1992–1995
E. Alexander Wachholz	Enno Pritzwalk	4–51	1992–1993
Ulrike Luderer	Dr. Karin Wagner, née Heinemann	5–350	1992–1995
Joachim Jung	Karlheinz "Charly" Tigges	7–321	1992–1995
Ygal Gleim	Ronald "Ronny" Berger	8–169	1992–1994
Evelyn Palek	Elfriede Voss, née Berger	8–88	1992–1994
Victoria Fast	Stefanie Berger	8–88	1992–1994
Sabine Nötzel	Johanna Schwerdtfeger	12–144	1992–1994
Volkmar Witt	Hannes Voss	20–88	1992–1994
Gerd Udo Feller	Friedrich Dettmer	29–3157	1993–2007
Patrick Pinheiro	Branko Semenic	44–220	1993–1995
Regina Lemnitz	Fanny Ginster	53–212	1993–1995
Bernhard Letizky	Franz Ginster	53–162	1993–1994
Kerstin Wittemeyer	Franziska "Fränzi" Ginster #1	53–136	1993–1994
Juana von Jascheroff	Cassy Robinson, née Sievenich †	59–390	1993–1995
Johanna Klante	Christina Robinson	59–425	1993–1996
Claus Ringer	Peter Sommer	61–287	1993–1995
Kathrin Ackermann	Charlotte Meißner	82–186	1994–1995
Stephanie Kellner	Nadine Voss	85–912	1994–1998
Julia Biedermann	Franziska "Fränzi" Ginster #2	138–313	1994–1995
Lutz Winde	Marco Busch #2 †	152–667	1994–1997
Berrit Arnold	Annalena Bergmann	156–1052; 1659–2358; 2733–2745; 3082–3105; 3869–3901	1994–1998; 2001–2004; 2005; 2007; 2010
Giovanni Arvaneh	Sülo Özgentürk †	161–756; 969–993; 2087–3619	1994–1997; 1998; 2003–2009
Caroline Grothgar	Svenja Gerster	165–703; 968–993	1994–1997; 1998
Malte Friedrich	Heiner Schmitz †	167–409	1994–1996
Peter Priegann	Sascha Arenth	167–576	1994–1996
Ingo Wirth	Simon Wegener	168–612	1994–1996
Michael Jäger	Matthias Kruse	170–2479; 3104–3163	1995–2004; 2007
Florian Karlheim	Oliver "Olli" Ebert	179–1451	1995–2000
Margit Geissler	Hilde Poppel, née Möhlmann #2 †	181–658 († 698)	1995–1997
Natalie de la Piedra	Teresa Lobefaro †	182–1112	1995–1998
Jan Mrachacz	Felix Hertel †	187–476	1995–1996
Nicole Belstler-Boettcher	Sandra Behrens, née Lindner	196–728; 1168–3548	1995–1997; 1999–2009
Diana Greifenstein	Anna Förtig	201–1953	1995–2002
Crisaide Mendes	Paula Poppel, adopted, née Oliveira	222–1188; 1414–1444; 2864–2958	1995–1999; 2000; 2006
Cyrus David	Dr. Robert Eschenbach †	234–935	1995–1998
Wolfgang Seidenberg	Frank Töppers	296–4053	1995–2011
Sybille Heyen	Babette von Dornhausen	312–568	1995–1996
John Jürgens	Konstantin Deile	332–639; 1936–1937	1995–1997; 2002
Andreas Bieber	Philipp Wolfengruber	391–627	1995–1996
Leonore Capell	Andrea Süsskind, adopted, née Lindenfelser	395–2648	1995–2005
Mia Martin	Bettina Lindner	422–938	1996–1998
Miriam Smolka	Mascha Gellert	452–1288; 1398–1408; 3869–3875	1996–1999; 2000; 2010
Christof Arnold	Bastian Spranger	469–1442	1996–2000
Sebastian Fischer	Emanuel Zirkowski	517–1905	1996–2002
Matthias Freihof	Boris Magnus	522–697	1996–1997
Susanne Steidle	Regina Zirkowski, née Riemer †	534–3160	1996–2007
Sven Thiemann	Karlheinz "Charly" Kolbe	548–579; 684–4053	1996; 1997–2011
Susanna Wellenbrink	Elena Zirkowski #1	564–915	1996–1998
Katja Keller	Sybille "Billi" Vogt	699–1052; 1329–1868	1997–1998; 1999–2002
Klaus Nierhoff	Hannes Port	702–933	1997–1998
Katrin Filzen	Meike Port	707–1563	1997–2000
Judith Hildebrandt	Christina "Tinka" Kuczinski	735–1368; 1612–1658	1997–2000; 2001
Sascha Heymans	Tobias "Tobi" Kuczinski	735–1633	1997–2001
Marcus Kaloff	Karlheinz "Kalle" Kuczinski †	738–1002	1997–1998
Heike Thiem-Schneider	Corinna Kuczinski, née Taubenrauch	739–1709	1997–2001
Annika Murjahn	Zoé Voss	758–1322	1997–1999
Frank Ruttloff	Dr. Sven Port	802–2738; 3264–3309	1997–2005; 2008
Melanie Marx	Dorothea "Doro" Stockner †	852–1678	1997–2001
Michael Stölzl	Luke-Robin "Robby" Stockner #1	888–1059; 1203–1242; 1445–1717; 1972–1983; 2081–2088	1998; 1999; 1999–2001; 2002; 2003
Nikolaus Gröbe	Björn Hempken	894–1118	1998–1999
Christopher Krieg	Andreas "Andy" Hackhofer	962–1176	1998–1999
Laura Schneider	Lee Neuhaus	995–1593	1998–2000
Christian Buse	Thorsten Fechner	1009–3471	1998–2011
François Smesny	Dr. Roman Westermeier	1012–1699	1998–2001
Beatrice Masala	Yvette Westermeier, adopted, née Mlope	1059–1088; 1251–1267; 1369–1428	1998; 1999; 2000
Birte Berg	Ulla Neuhaus	1061–1593	1998–2000
Erwin Aljukic	Frederik Neuhaus †	1097–1749	1998–2001
Andreas Kaufmann	Jürgen Jungmann †	1149–1387	1999–2000
Celia Kim	Eun-Hi "Kim" Töppers, née Kim	1212–2432	1999–2004
Sebastian Deyle	Niklas "Nik" Schubert	1236–1909	1999–2002
Melanie Rohde	Hannah van der Looh	1301–1855	1999–2002
Sebastian Winkler	Lennard Fechner	1320–1547	1999–2000
Imke Müller	Natalie Hagen †	1352–1493	1999–2000
Frederik Babucke	Dominik Kessler	1480–1855	2000–2002
Alfonso Losa	Carlos Garcia	1481–4053	2000–2011
Donia Ben-Jemia	Lucretia "Lucy" Vogt	1482–1909	2000–2002
Henriette Richter-Röhl	Elena Zirkowski #2	1513–2166	2000–2003
Nina Louise	Antonia "Toni" Port, née Maldini #1	1518–2851	2000–2006
Gabriel Andrade	Dino Maldini #1	1520–2404	2000–2004
Simon-Paul Wagner	Marlon Berger	1523–3986	2000–2011
Antonio Putignano	Stefano Maldini	1544–4053	2000–2011
Heike Ulrich	Tanja Maldini, née Krüger	1544–4053	2000–2011
Shirli Volk	Annika Kruse	1669–2483; 3882–3888	2001–2004; 2010
Walter Unterweger	Michael "Michi" Derflinger †	1694–2043	2001–2002
Shary Reeves	Josephine "Jo" Achebe †	1704–1971	2001–2002
Andreas Jung	Dr. Jochen Berger	1706–2415	2001–2004
Sandra Keller	Valerie Kniebe	1725–1753; 1885–2123	2001; 2002–2003
Carolin Gralla	Beatrix "Trixi" van der Looh	1729–2818	2001–2006
Johannes Raspe	Justus Hofmann	1926–2173	2002–2003
Tanja Mairhofer	Sophie Hofmann †	1930–2169	2002–2003
Felix zu Knyphausen	Nils Hofer	1955–2084	2002–2003
Mirco Wallraf	Raul Garcia	2044–4053	2002–2011
Isis Schabana	Felicitas "Feli" Hagedorn †	2058–2510	2002–2004
Mary Muhsal	Lilith "Lilli" Karuba, née Weidemann	2230–3056	2003–2007
Rebecca Goldblat	Katharina "Kati" Fuchs †	2306–2795	2004–2006
Jana Voosen	Luna-Marie Seelig	2362–2673	2004–2005
Nermina Kukic	Susanne "Susi" Schäfer	2380–3458	2004–2008
Michael Meziani	Kai Süsskind	2409–3362	2004–2008
Isabella Hübner	Dr. Lisa Busch #2	2426–4053	2004–2011
Fabian Baier	Steve Busch	2426–3632	2004–2009
Clara-Maria Graf	Pia Busch	2426–3462	2004–2008
Janne Drücker	Anne Maldini, adopted, née Bach	2506–3178; 3289–3298	2004–2007; 2008
Roland Pfaus	Dr. Jakob Weidemann	2626–2648; 2820–3548	2005; 2006–2009
Katrin Ritt	Yasemin Garcia, née Özgentürk	2672–3261; 3402–3606; 3905–4053	2005–2008; 2008–2009; 2010–2011
Julia Dahmen	Constanze Riemer	2712–3482; 3621–4053	2005–2008; 2009–2011
Bernd Bozian	Luke-Robin "Robby" Stockner #2	2732–3298	2005–2008
Vaile Fuchs	Jessica "Jessy" Wieland †	2798–3226	2006–2007
Sandra Koltai	Antonia "Toni" Stein, née Maldini #2	2912–4053	2006–2011
Julika Wagner	Amelie Berger, née Verhaag †	3113–3698; 3715–3717; 3755–3756; 3797–3798	2007–2009; 2009; 2010; 2010
Christian Volkmann	David Verhaag, adopted	3138–3866	2007–2010
Maike Billitis	Kerstin Töppers, née Adler	3195–3822	2007–2010
Katharina Woschek	Marie Töppers, accepted, née Adler	3195–3632	2007–2009
Sebastian Reusse	Harald "Harry" Töppers	3202–3478	2007–2008
Ivonne Polizzano	Agnetha "Netty" Töppers	3216–4053	2007–2011
Jan Stapelfeldt	Valentin Ernst	3305–3792	2008–2010
Verena Mörtel	Heidi Torg	3578–3598; 3665–4053	2009–2011
Hendrik Borgmann	Dr. Nicolas "Nic" Stein	3616–4053	2009–2011
Simone Gorholt	Jacqueline "Jackie" Horvath	3639–4028	2009–2011
Maria Hönig	Lea Horvath	3639–3792; 4009–4014	2009–2010; 2011
Tuna Ünal	Tarek Berisi	3723–4053	2009–2011
Marc Philipp	Dino Maldini #2	3882–4053	2010–2011

=== Recurring cast members ===
Actor	Role	Episodes	Years
Natalia Lapina	Natalie Jensen	1, 27–32	1992, 1993
Didi Schaak	Joe Markert	1–48	1992–1993
Gundis Zámbó	Corinna Marx	5–48	1992–1993
Sabi Dorr	Dr. Mahmoud Etcherelli	13–22	1992
Daniele Legler	Dr. Reza Shirazi	25–52	1992–1993
Mario Liberatore	Ulrich Dettmer †	26–36	1992–1993
Gundula Liebisch	Roswitha Müller	27–39	1993
Gerd Silberbauer	Herbert Groth †	33–42	1993
Renate Muhri	Jutta Kelm, née Winkelmann	39–44	1993
	Eric Stevens, adopted, née Erich Sievenich	185–188	1995
Lola Mendes	Mariella Lobefaro †	201–216	1995
René Schoenenberger	Otto Gobrecht	218–247	1995
Michaela Geuer	Miss Irrgang	218–3311	1995–2008
Matthias Rimpler	Gerhard Behrens #2	269–319	1995
Hansi Kraus	Alexander Stollberg	387–451	1995–1996
Theo Maalek	Bernd Süsskind †	4??–418	1996
Gerd Rigauer	Günter Mertens	420–458; 625–639	1996; 1996–1997
Yves-Yuri Garate	Miguel Diaz de Solis	569–615	1996
Lisa Potthoff	Uschi Kleber †	579–804	1996–1997
Justina del Corte	Emilia Aicher, née Oliveira	596–600	1996
Matthias Schlüter	Gabriel Aicher	619–656	1996–1997
Britta Gartner	Dr. Carolin Berger	619–698	1996–1997
Ivan Robert Sertic	Dr. Bernd Kippert	643–698	1997
Manuela Riva †	Mathilde "Tilli" Troll †	645–653; 746–752; 840–841; 1286–1288	1997; 1997; 1997; 1999
Claus Peter Seifert	David Langenbroich	654–684; 921–922	1997; 1998
Klaus Zmorek	Jacques Deville	693–713; 974–983	1997; 1998
Yvonne de Bark	Aishe Memis	746–756; 985–993	1997; 1998
Nicolas Loibl	Tim "Timmi" Töppers #1	750–2423; 2645–2646; 2724–2743; 3100–3103	1997–2004; 2005; 2005; 2007
Daniela Arden	Livia Gellert	954–1034	1998
Lomeo Camarda	Ritchie Engel	995–1107	1998
Dieter Bach	Kai Aigner	1204–1232	1999
Katja Marie Glienke	Gabi Trilling, née Stockner †	1210–1242; 1445–1475	1999; 2000
Michael Häfner †	Heinz Trilling	1211–1226; 1469–1474	1999; 2000
Sebastian Gerold	Anton Klayber †	1324–1518	1999–2000
Adelheid Thiel	Marlies Frohberg	1371–1428	2000
Oliver Sauer	Thomas Wendel †	1384–1404; 1465–1478	2000
Luise Bähr	Sarah Koch	1405–1435; 1655–1668	2000; 2001
Sven Kramer	Hendrik Heltau	1406–1428	2000
Hans Sigl	Cjelko Nemec aka Bogdan Vogt †	1429–1548; 1828–1838	2000; 2002
Rade Radovic	Dario Dincic †	1530–1544; 1837–1838	2000; 2002
Jürg D. Rieder	Christoph Menger	1542–1609	2000–2001
Errol Harewood	K.C. Taylor	1561–1593	2000
Gitte Rugaard	Maria Sieber	1584–1610	2000–2001
Jonathan Sonnenschein	Dennis Sattler †	1603–1648	2001
Hanna Köhler	Francesca "Nonna" Maldini	1723–3267	2001–2008
Severin Tyroller	Maximilian "Maxi" Busch #3	1743–2415	2001–2004
Jonathan Sonnenschein	Kevin Sattler	1768–1779	2001
Anette Daugardt	Marina Kruse	1780–1800	2001
Claudio Maniscalco	Leonardo Maldini	1800–1815	2001
Inka Calvi	Laura Berger	1854–1868	2002
Freya Trampert	Gina Goldberg	1916–1982	2002
Andreas Seyferth	Valentin Hofmann	1928–2173	2002–2003
Jessica Boehrs	Melanie Neuhaus aka Caris Newton	1932–1952	2001
Vanessa Loibl	Nicole Deile	1936–2415	2002–2004
Brigitte Antonius	Renate Fechner †	1999–2009; 2603–2643	2002; 2005
Christian Petru	Luca Maldini	2021–2035; 2090–2091; 2157–2168; 2289–2295; 2321–2323	2002; 2003; 2003; 2003; 2004
Andreas Zimmermann	Florian Lichtenfels †	2123–2141; 2259–2268	2003
Isabella Jantz	Dunja Sieben	2124–2141	2003
Nadja Lenszen	Justine Harris	2156–2167	2003
Gaspar Cano	Gaspar Garcia #1	2167–2179	2003
Wookie Mayer	Carola Berger	2194–2216	2003
Marque Nigsch	Tom Hirsch	2234–2250	2003
Miriam Lahnstein	Sabine Huber	2328–2349	2004
Jens Koennecke	Maurice Brunot	2328–2358	2004
Souzan Alavi	Sina Achterberg	2437–2533	2004
Julia Palmer-Stoll †	Simone Wolf	2557–2638	2005
Thorsten Nindel	Dr. Robert Schulte-Busch, née Schulte	2593–2698; 3031–3034; 3069–3105; 3456–3463; 3876–3879	2005; 2007; 2007; 2008; 2010
Yavuz Asanatucu	Yilmaz Özgentürk †	2672–3548	2005–2009
Özgür Özata	Fari Erdokan	2729–2734; 3531–3548	2005; 2009
Christian Polito	Leonard "Leo" Fischer	2737–4031	2005–2011
Hakan Can	Cem Özgentürk	2758–2770; 3043–3067	2005; 2007
Antonio di Mauro	Luigi Maldini	2794–2868; 2970–2972	2006
Claudius Zimmermann	Gaspar Garcia #2	2822–2836; 2884–2886; 3468–3508	2006; 2006; 2008–2009
Ursula Michelis	Carla "Carlita" Garcia	2884–2886; 3499–3508; 3552–3573	2006; 2009; 2009
Lucia Thomas	Carolina "Caro" Behrens #2	2885–3548; 3679–3681	2006–2009; 2009
Mirja Mahir	Katja Lang	2892–2948; 2973–3045	2006; 2006–2007
Baffour Nkrumah	Baschirou Karuba	2918–3056	2006–2007
Jana Hora	Vivian Dünnwald	3007–3033	2006–2007
Alexander Pelz	Axel Tewes	3038–3113	2007
Matthias Beier	Mischa Hofmeister	3141–3247	2007
Andreas Kaufmann	Bernhard "Benno" Richter	3144–3176	2007
Rosetta Pedone	Laura Conti	3300–3446; 3529–3627	2008; 2009
Daphne Wagner	Annette Sandmann aka Gabriele Verhaag †	3331–3377	2008
Martina Maurer	Camilla Töppers	3341–3459	2008
Maria Mittler	Aurelia Maldini	3381–3478; 3811–3813	2008; 2010
Petra Gumpold	Stefanie Hüsgen	3465–3518; 3583–3604	2008–2009; 2009
Tom Viehöfer	Roman Sander	3554–3638	2009
Gloria Nefzger	Jule Busch	3592–3609	2009
Tibor Taylor	Walter Tennenberg	3634–3668	2009
Daryl Jackson	Brian Archer	3679–3699	2009
Holger C. Gotha	Peter Siegel	3687–3701; 3747–3753	2009; 2010
Chi Le	Yuna Kapur	3689–3779	2009–2010
Shayan Hartmann	Bruno Zirkowski #2	3729–4053	2009–2011
Maike von Bremen	Juliette Gagnon	3734–3822	2009–2010
Yvonne Burbach	Frida Reichert	3766–3799; 3827–3917	2010
Valentina Pahde	Carolina "Caro" Behrens #3	3784–4053	2010–2011
Leonie Kienzle	Vanessa Krüger	3794; 3831–3833; 3971–4037	2010; 2010; 2011
Karyn von Ostholt	Elisabeth von Seggern	3835–3858	2010
Annika Preil	Maximiliane "Maxi" Engelein	3859–3992	2010–2011
Timothy Raschdorf	Tim "Timmi" Töppers #2	3869–4053	2010–2011
Cosima-Lucia Muck	Leila Garcia	3907–4053	2010–2011
Anna Lena Class	Jutta Denka	3953–3967	2010–2011
Lara-Isabelle Rentinck	Sabina Breuer	3965–3986	2011
Ramona Lutz	Fariba Berisi	3983–3990	2011
Jana Lissovskaia	Olga Weberskaja	3994–4053	2011
