= Schulmädchen =

- Genre: Comedy
- Created by: Bora Dağtekin; Mathias Dinter
- Starring: Birthe Wolter; Simone Hanselmann; Laura Osswald; Jessica Franz; Saskia de Lando; Marie Rönnebeck
- Opening theme: Pilot: "100%Emotional" by No Angels; Season 1: "Hey Baby" by No Doubt; Season 2: "Hook Me Up" by Schulmädchen
- Country of origin: Germany
- No. of seasons: 2
- No. of episodes: 15

Production
- Running time: 25 minutes

Original release
- Network: RTL
- Release: 31 May 2002 – 2005

Schulmädchen (German for "schoolgirls") is a comedy series aired on RTL Television in Germany beginning in 2002. A total of fifteen episodes have been produced as of 2005. While the show's title is a clear reference to Schulmädchen-Report, a series of soft core porn movies made in Germany in the 1970s, the show itself is a parody of imported American teen dramas such as the 1988 movie Heathers and television series Beverly Hills, 90210, which have long been popular in Germany.

The show follows the adventures of a group of pushy, wealthy teenage girls at the fictitious Franz Josef Strauss-Gymnasium in Munich. (Several of Strauss' descendants have protested the use of his name on the show.)

The show stars Birthe Wolter as Laura, Laura Osswald as Cara, Simone Hanselmann as Stella and Arzu Bazman as Ramona. The show's theme song is "Hey Baby" by No Doubt.

== Seasons ==
=== Season 1 ===
Number of episode	Number of season	Title (original)	Title (English)	Original air date
1	0	Pilot	Pilot	31 March 2002
2	1	Größer ist besser	Bigger is better	30 January 2004
3	2	Der Duft der Frauen	The scent of women	6 February 2004
4	3	Drei sind einer zu viel	Three are one to many	13 February 2004
5	4	Ruf! Mich! An!	Call me!	20 February 2004
6	5	Die Qual der Wahl	Spoilt for choice	27 February 2004
7	6	Der Käfermann	The beetle man	27 February 2004

=== Season 2 ===
Number of episode	Number of season	Title (original)	Title (English)	Original air date
8	1	Die Schulmutti	The school mom	29 July 2005
9	2	Chromosom XY ungelöst	Chromosome XY unresolved	29 July 2005
10	3	Poolboys & Sextoys	Poolboys & Sextoys	5 August 2005
11	4	Geiz ist geil	Greed is great	5 August 2005
12	5	Hilfe, ich bin lesbisch	Help, I'm a Lesbian	12 August 2005
13	6	Teppichluder	Carpet bitch	12 August 2005
14	7	Method Acting	Method Acting	19 August 2005
15	8	Sexdiät	Sex diet	12 August 2005
