= Yvonne de Bark =

German actress and author

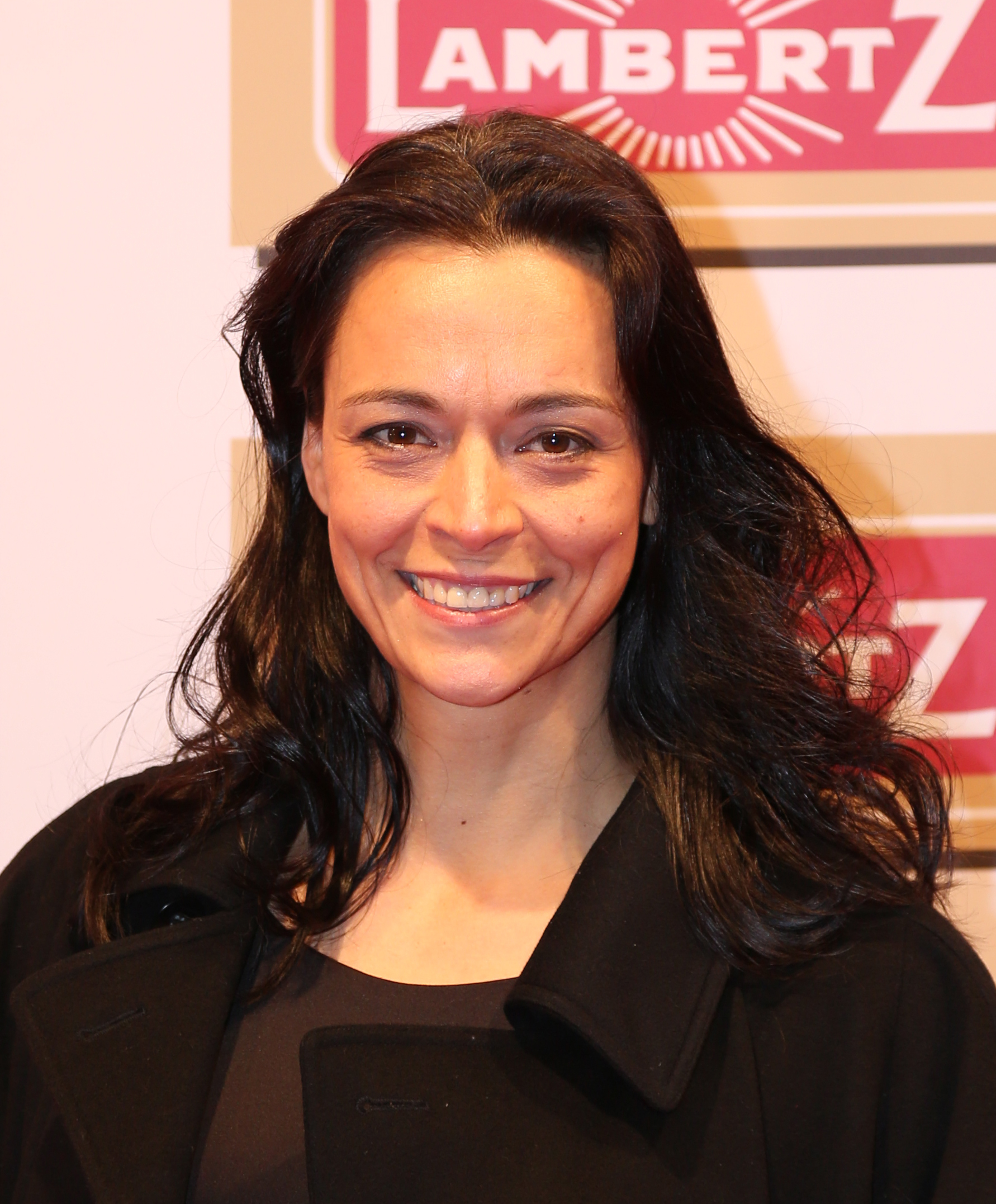
- Yvonne de Bark in 2017
- Born: August 8, 1972 (age 54); Munich
- Occupations: film and television actress and author

Yvonne de Bark (born 8 August 1972 in Munich) is a German film and television actress and author.

== Life ==
Yvonne de Bark studied Sports and English in order to become a certified teacher but eventually she changed plans and attended instead a drama school. Consequently, she starred in both Enzo Barboni's Sons of Trinity and Cornelia Grünberg's Zeit des Schweigens (Time of Silence). Before her parental leave she furthermore played the female lead in FinalCut.com which was released in Germany under the title Suicide.

From 2000 to 2001, she starred in the German TV show Die Motorrad-Cops playing convincingly the courageous and sometimes even capricious female officer Sunny Labonne. Because of the many elaborate stunts in each episode, the making of the show was expensive and when due to a general crisis the prices for TV advertising shrank, it was considered as a financial risk to continue. However, the series has been successfully released on DVD in the meantime .

Moreover, she appeared in further German TV shows such as Drei zum Verlieben, Marienhof, Der Fahnder, Alphateam, Alarm für Cobra 11, Im Namen des Gesetzes, Hallo Robbie! and Küstenwache. Her complete TV filmography is to be found on her Official Homepage (German only).

After her parental leave from June 21, 2006, Yvonne de Bark starred in Germany's popular soap opera Unter Uns acting as Dr. Pia Lassner, the local GP of the fictional Schillerallee where the show's plot is set. Her last shooting took place on June 13, 2009 for her last appearing on screen in mid-August of the same year.

In February 2008, she published her first book titled Mama-Trost-Buch – Auch andere Mütter erziehen Monster (Mom's Backup Book – Also other mothers raise monsters). Here she describes raising children while putting educational advisors to a tough test.

Twelve months later, she published her second book titled Mamas wissen mehr – das schräge Fachwissen der Mütter (Mummies know more – The cool know-how of mothers), which humorously offers a mother's comprehensive practical knowledge.

On April 11, 2010, she participated in the German version of Celebrity Come Dine with Me along with presenter Oliver Petszokat, singer Benjamin Boyce and TV show host Kelly Trump.

Yvonne de Bark and her convivant, director Raoul Heimrich, reside with their two children in Rösrath, Germany.
