= Mimi Fiedler =

German actress (b. 1975)

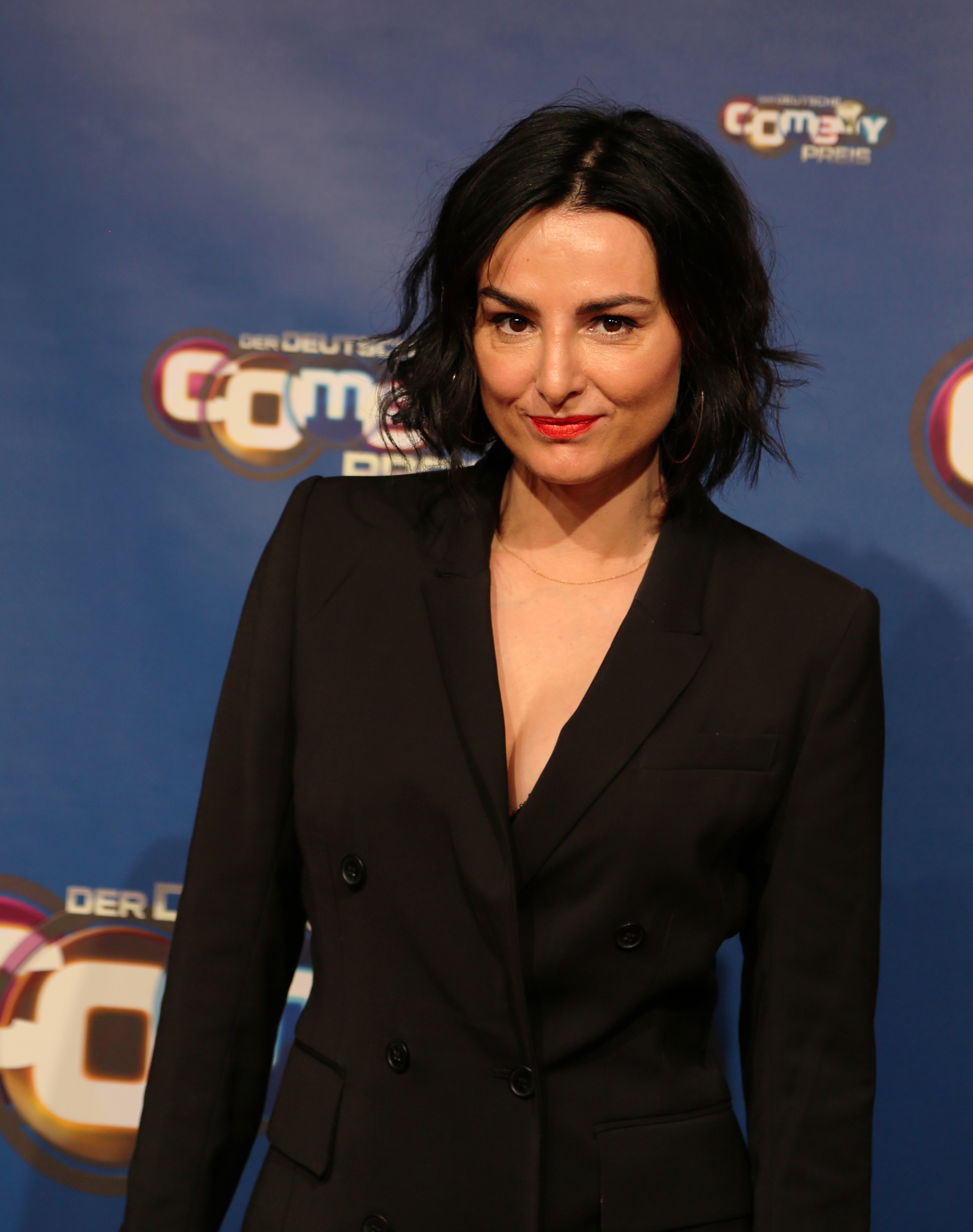
- Fiedler in 2017
- Born: Miranda Čondić-Kadmenović; 11 September 1975 (age 49); Split, SR Croatia, SFR Yugoslavia
- Occupation: Actress
- Spouse(s): N.N. Leonhardt (2000-2002); Otto Steiner (2019-present)
- Children: 1

Mimi Fiedler (born 11 September 1975), known until 2012 as Miranda Leonhardt, formerly Miranda Toma, is a German actress of Croatian origin.

== Childhood and education ==
Fiedler was born as Miranda Čondić-Kadmenović in Split. She moved to Germany with her parents when she was only two years old. On the advice of her Munich agent, she changed her family name to Toma, the first name of her great-grandfather, in order to have a name that was easier to pronounce in Germany and to get better acting roles.

== Career ==
In 1996, Fiedler started her career in the theater. At the community theatre of the Schauspielhaus in Frankfurt, she played among others Maria in the West Side Story. She made her film debut in 1998 in the short film Zita - Tales of Deadly Sins, which won the special jury prize at the International New Film Festival in Turin. She then appeared in Yara by Yılmaz Arslan, as well as the movie Solo für Klarinette in 1998 with Götz George and Corinna Harfouch.

After two appearances in the RTL series Die Wache, she played in the Das Erste series Bei aller Liebe. There were other minor supporting roles in Tatort as well as in the series Alarm für Cobra 11 - Die Autobahnpolizei, Großstadtrevier and Im Namen des Gesetzes. In 2004, she played the role of Frenzy in the ProSieben production Sex und mehr, with which she became known to a larger audience from 2005 on in the series Alles außer Sex. In 2005, she played in the movie Stille Sehnsucht - Warchild by Christian Wagner, which was awarded the special jury prize at the 2006 Bavarian Film Awards. In April 2008, she starred in the Utta Danella film Mit dir die Sterne (with you to see the stars). She played the main role together with Roman Knižka and Sonja Kirchberger. From 2008 to 2018, Fiedler was seen as forensic technician Nika Banovic in the Stuttgart Tatort of the SWR.

Fiedler also works as a fashion editor for the international magazine Neue Mode Magazine, takes photos and appears on stage as a guest singer with various rock bands. In 2009, Universal released their single with the two songs Heartbeat Radio and Rock 'n' Roll Star (a collaboration with the London band Urban Delights). In the same year, she was shown under the name Miranda Leonhardt on the cover of the Playboy August issue and on the inside - a second time seven years later under the name Mimi Fiedler in November 2016.

== Personal life ==
Fiedler is the mother of one daughter. In 2000 she married and took the name of her husband, Leonhardt. The marriage ended in divorce in 2002. From 2003 to 2010, she was in a relationship with her fellow actor Mišel Matičević. In 2012 she got engaged to her childhood sweetheart and adopted the stage name "Mimi Fiedler", a combination of her nickname and his surname. She kept this after her betrothal. From 2014 to September 2017, she and the actor Bernhard Bettermann were a couple. In 2015 both took part in the RTL dance show Stepping Out. In October 2016, they announced their engagement. After separation and engagement in September 2017, Fiedler has been living in a relationship with TV producer and sports official Otto Steiner, with whom she has been married since 9 January 2019, since October 2017. In April 2020, she announced through an Instagram post that she fell into a deep hole after a breakup. The consequences were burnout, financial problems and alcohol addiction. After losing her driver's license due to drunk-driving, she joined Alcoholics Anonymous in 2010 and overcame her addiction.
