= R. I. S. – Die Sprache der Toten =

- Genre: Crime drama
- Created by: Georg Kemter
- Starring: Julian Weigend; Jana Klinge; Tillbert Strahl-Schäfer; Proschat Madani; Hansa Czypionka; Nicole Marischka; Catherine Bode; Denis Petkovic; Mathis Künzler
- Opening theme: "It's No Good" by Depeche Mode
- Country of origin: Germany
- Original language: German
- No. of seasons: 2
- No. of episodes: 25 (list of episodes)

Production
- Production locations: Berlin, Germany
- Running time: 45'

Original release
- Network: Sat.1
- Release: March 25, 2007 – February 7, 2008

R. I. S. – Die Sprache der Toten (engl. R. I. S. – The Language of the Dead) is a German television series broadcast by Sat.1 since 2007. The R. I. S. in the title is an acronym for Rechtsmedizinische Investigative Sonderkommission (engl. Forensic Investigative Special Commission), referring to the fictional police investigation unit that is the focus of the series. The series, a crime drama, is a remake of an Italian television series entitled RIS Delitti Imperfetti.

The first season ended on 10 June 2007. The second and final season with another 13 episodes began airing 15 November 2007.

== Plot summary ==
R. I. S. – Die Sprache der Toten is the second spin-off series of RIS Delitti Imperfetti. The Series follows the team of experts in Berlin who are trying to solve the crime with the help of evidence. The head of the R.I.S team is Philip Jacobi.

== Characters ==
Character	Played by	Seasons	
Character	Played by	1	2
Philip Jacobi	Julian Weingend	Main	Main
Marie Severin	Jana Klinge	Main	Main
Timo Braun	Tillbert Strahl-Schäfer	Main	Main
Judith Karimi	Proschat Madani	Main	Main
Paul Schreider	Hansa Czypionka	Main	Main
dr. Stefani Peters	Nicole Marischka	Main	Main
Katja Fried	Catherine Bode	Main	Main
Benno Wilms	Dejan Petković	Main	Main
Marcus Heuser	Mathis Künzler	Main	

- Philip Jacobi (Julian Weigend) - The head of the plan of the molecular geneticist exudes a natural authority and expect top performance from its employees. Philip only survived almost in its working environment, since his wife Jeanette, an archaeologist, with a return flight from one of her expeditions died in the explosion of a bomb on the plane.
- Marie Severin (Jana Klinge) - Biologist and computer scientist and thus a specialist in everything that has anything to do with computers. She is new to the team and has yet to prove. For men, there seems to be no place in their lives, because they can bounce off any overtures in. This is due to a two-years earlier rape, of which only Philip Jacobi knows to whom she is attracted from the beginning.
- Timo Braun (Tillbert Strahl-Schäfer) - The ballistics of the team, is a womanizer. Still, he knows how to set his priorities and his job he always professional bands to attach the proper importance.
- Judith Karimi (Proschat Madani) - Chemist, is an unconditional perfectionist since childhood. Accordingly, it also attracted school and study through in record time. Between their colleagues, who are also the best in their respective subject area, she feels comfortable, although these have to suffer a bit sometimes under their boundless zeal.
- Paul Schneider (Hansa Czypionka) - He is a legend in his field and started basic standard works. The biologist and molecular geneticist joined the police after his daughter was killed by a road hog and since then is in a wheelchair. The culprit was never caught.
- Dr. Stefanie Peters (Nicole Marischka) - She is the Medical Examiner of the crack you always. with humor and diligence in the matter Sometimes they need help, which is raising their child at home next to the profession and her husband.
- Katja Fried (Catherine Bode) - She comes from difficult social backgrounds. Backpressure and ridicule from the outside, they put her desire to become a police officer, by. This uncompromising approach distinguishes their work from today.
- Benno Wilms (Denis Petković) - He is the direct connection of the R. I. S. for criminal investigation.
- Marcus Heuser (Mathis Künzler) - He is a crime technician and anti-terrorist specialist in the team. He left R.I.S at the end of the season 1.

== Episodes ==
- List of R. I. S. - Die Sprache der Toten episodes

Series	Episodes	Originally broadcast	
Series	Episodes	Series premiere	Series finale
1	12	25 March 2007	10 June 2007
2	13	15 November 2007	7 February 2008

== See also ==
- R.I.S, police scientifique, the French remake of RIS Delitti Imperfetti
- List of R. I. S. - Die Sprache der Toten episodes
- RIS Delitti Imperfetti, the original Italian version
