= Jana Voosen =

German actress (born 1976)

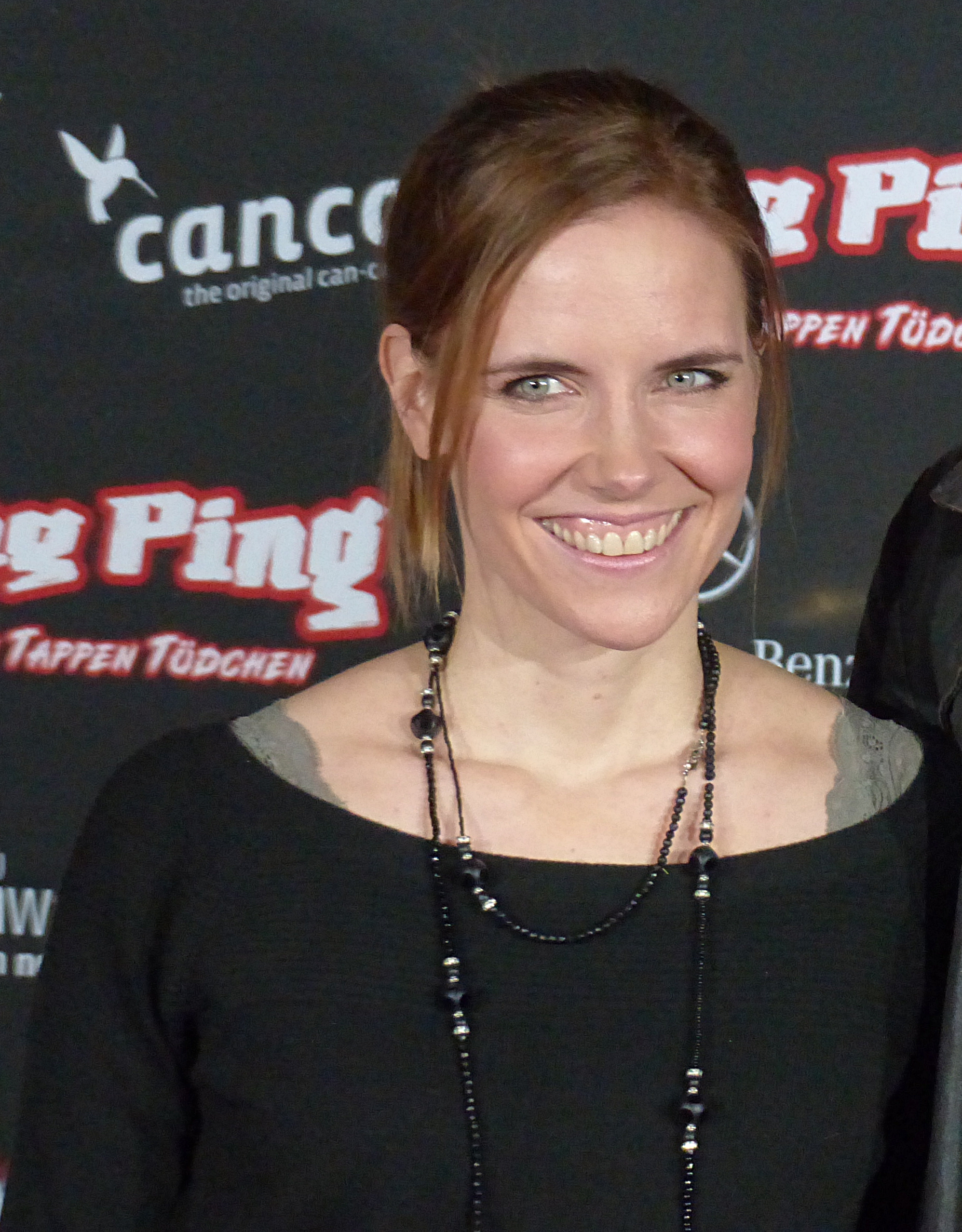
Image of Jana Voosen

Jana Voosen (born May 7, 1976, in Hamburg) is a German actress and writer.

== Biography ==
Jana Voosen completed her Abitur and her Banklehre in Wuppertal. She trained as an actress at acting schools in Hamburg and New York City.

Voosen has been married to director and screenwriter Kilian Riedhof since the beginning of 2014.

== Filmography (selection) ==
- 2002: Stahlnetz: Ausgelöscht
- 2002: Tatort: Der Passagier
- 2003: Evelyn Hamann Special
- 2003: Luis
- 2004: Einsatz in Hamburg
- 2004–2005: Marienhof (leading role)
- 2005: Tatort: Feuerkämpfer
- 2006: Im Tal der wilden Rosen: Bis ans Ende der Welt
- 2006: Doppelter Einsatz
- 2006: Großstadtrevier
- 2006: Notruf Hafenkante
- 2006: Profile of Fear (engl.) (leading role)
- 2007: Sommerwellen
- 2007: Deadline
- 2008: Tatort: Und tschüss
- 2008: Sommerwellen
- 2008: Küstenwache – Geld oder Leben
- 2008–2009: Klinik am Alex (leading role)
- 2009: Geliebte Familie (leading role)
- 2009: Hochzeitsreise zu viert (leading role)
- 2010: Ein Fall für Zwei – Todeslauf
- 2012: King Ping
- 2012: Heiter bis tödlich: Morden im Norden
- 2012: Küstenwache – Vergiftete Freundschaft
- 2013: Musikvideo "Sie ist wie April" / Jan Sievers
- 2013: Happy Anniversary
- 2014: Tatort: Der sanfte Tod
- 2015: Der Fall Barschel
- 2015: Mein Sohn Jerome
- 2015: Homeland (TV series, episode 5x11)
- 2016: Pfefferkörner
- 2017: Die Diplomatin: Jagd durch Prag
- 2018: Tatort: Maleficius
- 2021: Sesamstraße präsentiert: Eine Möhre für Zwei
- 2022: Hotel Mondial

== Works ==
=== Novels ===
- 2004: Schöner Lügen (Heyne) ISBN 978-3453878136
- 2005: Er liebt mich (Heyne) ISBN 978-3453401228
- 2006: Venus allein zu Haus (Heyne) ISBN 978-3453722019
- 2007: Zauberküsse (Heyne) ISBN 978-3453580374
- 2008: Mit freundlichen Küssen (Heyne) ISBN 978-3453405714
- 2009: Allein auf Wolke Sieben (Heyne) ISBN 978-3453406582
- 2011: Prinzessin oder Erbse? (Heyne) ISBN 978-3453408418
- 2012: Liebe mit beschränkter Haftung (Heyne) ISBN 978-3453409170
- 2013: Pantoffel oder Held? (Heyne) ISBN 978-3453410138
- 2014: Und Eva sprach (Heyne) ISBN 978-3453417892
- 2016: Santa schmeißt hin (Lübbe) ISBN 978-3986830014
- 2019: Für immer die Deine (Heyne) ISBN 978-3453423114
- 2021: Broken World – Wie willst du leben? (FJB) ISBN 978-3841421746
- 2021: Unser Weg nach morgen (Heyne) ISBN 978-3453425255
- 2022: Broken World 2 – Wer willst du sein? (Neobooks)
- 2023: Same time next year (Heyne) ISBN 978-3-453-42526-2

=== Plays ===
- 2003: Hunger (Deutscher Theaterverlag)
- 2004: Schlafmohn (Deutscher Theaterverlag)
- 2011: Dramaqueens (Deutscher Theaterverlag)
- 2023: Der Kritiker (LITAG Theaterverlag München)

=== Screenplay ===
- 2014: Happy Anniversary (short fiction film)
- 2018: Familie Dr. Kleist, TV series (2 episodes "Gemeinsam statt einsam" and "Eine Frage des Vertrauens")
