= Mathis Künzler =

Swiss actor (born 1978)

Mathis Künzler (born 13 June 1978 in Basel) is a Swiss film, television and stage actor. He grew up in suburban Münchenstein, close to the borders of France and Germany.

== Filmography ==
=== Films ===
- 2005: Snow White
- 2009: Robber Girls

=== TV ===
- 2004–2006: Verliebt in Berlin (Love in Berlin)
- 2007–2008: R. I. S. – Die Sprache der Toten
