= Volker Herold =

German actor and director (born 1959)

- Born: January 29, 1959 (age 67); Thale, Bezirk Halle, East Germany
- Occupations: Actor, Director
- Years active: 1990–present

Volker Herold (born 29 January 1959, in Thale) is a German actor and director.

== Filmography ==
- 1992: Freunde fürs Leben
- 1990-1995: Polizeiruf 110 (3 episodes)
- 1996: Alarmcode 112: Vier wie Blitz und Donner
- 1998: Moments in Monochrome
- 1998: Die Wache (1 episode)
- 1999: Downhill City
- 2001: Alarm für Cobra 11 – Die Autobahnpolizei (1 episode)
- 2005: Liebes Spiel
- 2005-2007: Verliebt in Berlin (40 episodes)
- 2009: Klinik am Alex (2 episodes)
- 2009: Liebe ist Verhandlungssache
