= Stepping Out (German TV series) =

- Genre: Competitive dancing
- Presented by: Daniel Hartwich & Sylvie Meis
- Judges: Jorge González; Motsi Mabuse; Joachim Llambi
- Country of origin: Germany
- Original language: German
- No. of series: 1
- No. of episodes: 6

Original release
- Release: 11 September 2015

Stepping Out is a German competitive dancing talent show that aired on RTL on 11 September 2015 and was hosted by Daniel Hartwich & Sylvie Meis. The judging panel consisted of Jorge González, Motsi Mabuse and Joachim Llambi.

Unlike other similar dance shows, the dancers were all couples in real life, not one celebrity plus one professional dancer.

== Contestants ==
| Celebrity | Known for | Coach | Status |
|---|---|---|---|
| Anna Hofbauer | Model & former Die Bachelorette star | Oliver Seefeldt | Winners on 16 October 2015 |
| Marvin Albrecht | Contestant on Die Bachelorette | Oliver Seefeldt | Winners on 16 October 2015 |
| Joelina Drews | Daughter of Jürgen Drews | Alla Bastert-Tkachenko | Runners-up on 16 October 2015 |
| Marc Aurel Zeeb | Contestant on Deutschland sucht den Superstar | Alla Bastert-Tkachenko | Runners-up on 16 October 2015 |
| Bruno Rauh | Contestant on Bauer sucht Frau | Timo Kulczak | Third place on 16 October 2015 |
| Anja Rauh | Contestant on Bauer sucht Frau | Timo Kulczak | Third place on 16 October 2015 |
| Mimi Fiedler | Tatort actress | Evgenij Voznyuk | Eliminated on 9 October 2015 |
| Bernhard Bettermann | Actor | Evgenij Voznyuk | Eliminated on 9 October 2015 |
| Felix von Jascheroff | Former Gute Zeiten, schlechte Zeiten actor | Maria Arces | Eliminated on 2 October 2015 |
| Lisa Steiner | Girlfriend of Felix von Jascheroff | Maria Arces | Eliminated on 2 October 2015 |
| Natascha Ochsenknecht | Actress | Nina Uszkureit | Eliminated on 11 September 2015 and on 25 September 2015 |
| Umut Kekilli | Football player | Nina Uszkureit | Eliminated on 11 September 2015 and on 25 September 2015 |
| Mario Basler | Former Football player | Marta Arndt | Withdrawn on 22 September 2015 |
| Doris Büld | Fashion designer | Marta Arndt | Withdrawn on 22 September 2015 |
| Björn Freitag | Chef | Oliver Thalheim | Eliminated on 18 September 2015 |
| Anna Freitag | Model & former Miss Germany | Oliver Thalheim | Eliminated on 18 September 2015 |

== Scoring chart ==
| Couple | Place | 1 | 2 | 3 | | | 4 | | | 5 Semi-Finals | | | 6 Finals | | | |
| Couple | Place | 1 | 2 | 1 | 2 | Σ | 1 | 2 | Σ | 1 | 2 | Σ | 1 | 2 | 3 | Σ |
|---|---|---|---|---|---|---|---|---|---|---|---|---|---|---|---|---|
| Anna Hofbauer | 1 | 17 | 26 | 21 | 6 | 27 | 29 | 10 | 39 | 28 | 19 | 47 | 17 | 29 | 28 | 74 |
| Marvin Albrecht | 2 | 21 | 27 | 16 | 6 | 22 | 18 | 0 | 18 | 28 | 14 | 42 | 20 | 28 | 28 | 76 |
| Joelina Drews | 3 | 28 | 23 | 28 | 8 | 36 | 21 | 0 | 21 | 25 | 27 | 52 | 30 | 30 | 30 | 90 |
| Marc Aurel Zeeb | 4 | 22 | 23 | 25 | 8 | 33 | 19 | 10 | 29 | 22 | 24 | 46 | 29 | 28 | 29 | 86 |
| Bruno Rauh | 5 | 17 | 14 | 8 | 1 | 9 | 13 | 0 | 13 | 10 | 8 | 18 | 18 | 21 | 16 | 55 |
| Anja Rauh | 6 | 18 | 13 | 11 | 1 | 12 | 10 | 0 | 10 | 10 | 5 | 15 | 18 | 19 | 16 | 53 |
| Mimi Fiedler | 7 | 22 | 10 | 18 | 10 | 28 | 26 | 0 | 26 | 10 | 18 | 28 | | | | |
| Bernhard Bettermann | 8 | 17 | 13 | 22 | 10 | 32 | − | | | 10 | 23 | 33 | | | | |
| Felix von Jascheroff | 9 | 5 | 16 | 7 | 4 | 11 | 12 | 0 | 12 | | | | | | | |
| Lisa Steiner | 10 | 6 | 17 | 9 | 4 | 13 | 7 | 0 | 7 | | | | | | | |
| Umut Kekilli | 11 | 12 | | 12 | 2 | 14 | | | | | | | | | | |
| Natascha Ochsenknecht | 12 | 13 | | 9 | 2 | 11 | | | | | | | | | | |
| Doris Büld | 13 | 12 | 13 | − | | | | | | | | | | | | |
| Mario Basler | 14 | 5 | 6 | − | | | | | | | | | | | | |
| Anna Freitag | 15 | 10 | 9 | | | | | | | | | | | | | |
| Björn Freitag | 16 | 5 | 6 | | | | | | | | | | | | | |

=== Average score chart ===
This table only counts dances scored on a 30-point scale; bonus scores are excluded.

| Rank by average | Place | Couple | Total points | Number of dances | Average |
|---|---|---|---|---|---|
| 1 | 3 | Joelina Drews | 242 | 9 | 26.9 |
| 2 | 4 | Marc Aurel Zeeb | 221 | 9 | 24.6 |
| 3 | 1 | Anna Hofbauer | 214 | 9 | 23.8 |
| 4 | 2 | Marvin Albrecht | 200 | 9 | 22.2 |
| 5 | 7 | Mimi Fiedler | 104 | 6 | 17.3 |
| 6 | 8 | Bernhard Bettermann | 85 | 5 | 17.0 |
| 7 | 5 | Bruno Rauh | 125 | 9 | 13.9 |
| 8 | 6 | Anja Rauh | 120 | 9 | 13.3 |
| 9 | 13 | Doris Büld | 25 | 2 | 12.5 |
| 10 | 11 | Umut Kekilli | 24 | 2 | 12.0 |
| 11 | 12 | Natascha Ochsenknecht | 22 | 2 | 11.0 |
| 12 | 9 | Felix von Jascheroff | 40 | 4 | 10.0 |
| 13 | 10 | Lisa Steiner | 39 | 4 | 9.8 |
| 14 | 15 | Anna Freitag | 19 | 2 | 9.5 |
| 16 | 16 | Björn Freitag | 11 | 2 | 5.5 |
| 16 | 14 | Mario Basler | 11 | 2 | 5.5 |

=== Highest and lowest scoring performances ===
The best and worst performances in each dance according to the judges' 30-point scale are as follows:

| Dance | Highest Scored dancer(s) | Highest score | Lowest Scored dancer(s) | Lowest score |
|---|---|---|---|---|
| Cha-Cha-Cha | Joelina Drews | 30 | Mario Basler | 5 |
| Rumba | Joelina Drews; Marvin Albrecht | 27 | Bruno Rauh | 8 |
| Jive | Joelina Drews | 25 | Anna Hofbauer | 17 |
| Paso Doble | Bernhard Bettermann | 23 | Lisa Steiner | 7 |
| Samba | Joelina Drews | 21 | Marvin Albrecht | 14 |
| Waltz | Bruno Rauh | 21 | Björn Freitag | 6 |
| Quickstep | Anna Hofbauer | 21 | Felix von Jascheroff | 5 |
| Tango | Bruno Rauh | 8 | Anja Rauh | 5 |
| Viennese Waltz | Joelina Drews | 30 | Mimi Fiedler | 26 |
| American Smooth | Bruno Rauh | 13 | Anja Rauh | 10 |
| Argentine Tango | Anna Hofbauer; Marvin Albrecht | 28 | Bernhard Bettermann | 17 |
| Disco | Anja Rauh; Bruno Rauh | 28 | Björn Freitag | 5 |
| Charleston | Anna Hofbauer | 29 | Anja Rauh; Bruno Rauh | 10 |
| Contemporary | Anna Hofbauer | 29 | Felix von Jascheroff | 16 |
| Hip-Hop | Joelina Drews; Marc Aurel Zeeb | 23 | | |
| Salsa | Mimi Fieder; Bernhard Bettermann | 10 | Anja Rauh; Bruno Rauh | 1 |
| Rock 'n' Roll | Anna Hofbauer; Marc Aurel Zeeb | 10 | | |
| Freestyle | Joelina Drews | 30 | Anja Rauh; Bruno Rauh | 16 |

== Dance chart ==
| Couple | Week 1 | Week 2 | Week 3 | | Week 4 | | Week 5 | | Week 6 | | |
|---|---|---|---|---|---|---|---|---|---|---|---|
| Joelina Drews | Cha-Cha-Cha | Hip-Hop | Viennese Waltz | Salsa Marathon | Samba | Rock 'n' Change | Jive | Rumba | Viennese Waltz | Cha-Cha-Cha | Freestyle |
| Marc Aurel Zeeb | Cha-Cha-Cha | Hip-Hop | Viennese Waltz | Salsa Marathon | Samba | Rock 'n' Change | Jive | Rumba | Viennese Waltz | Cha-Cha-Cha | Freestyle |
| Anna Hofbauer | Jive | Rumba | Quickstep | Salsa Marathon | Contemporary | Rock 'n' Change | Argentine Tango | Samba | Jive | Contemporary | Freestyle |
| Marvin Albrecht | Jive | Rumba | Quickstep | Salsa Marathon | Contemporary | Rock 'n' Change | Argentine Tango | Samba | Jive | Contemporary | Freestyle |
| Anja Rauh | Waltz | Disco | Rumba | Salsa Marathon | American Smooth | Rock 'n' Change | Charleston | Tango | Disco | Waltz | Freestyle |
| Bruno Rauh | Waltz | Disco | Rumba | Salsa Marathon | American Smooth | Rock 'n' Change | Charleston | Tango | Disco | Waltz | Freestyle |
| Mimi Fiedler | Argentine Tango | Cha-Cha-Cha | Jive | Salsa Marathon | Viennese Waltz | Rock 'n' Change | Rumba | Paso Doble | | | |
| Bernhard Bettermann | Argentine Tango | Cha-Cha-Cha | Jive | Salsa Marathon | Viennese Waltz | Rock 'n' Change | Rumba | Paso Doble | | | |
| Lisa Steiner | Quickstep | Contemporary | Waltz | Salsa Marathon | Paso Doble | Rock 'n' Change | | | | | |
| Felix von Jascheroff | Quickstep | Contemporary | Waltz | Salsa Marathon | Paso Doble | Rock 'n' Change | | | | | |
| Natascha Ochsenknecht | Waltz | | Cha-Cha-Cha | Salsa Marathon | | | | | | | |
| Umut Kekilli | Waltz | | Cha-Cha-Cha | Salsa Marathon | | | | | | | |
| Doris Büld | Cha-Cha-Cha | Charleston | | | | | | | | | |
| Mario Basler | Cha-Cha-Cha | Charleston | | | | | | | | | |
| Anna Freitag | Disco | Waltz | | | | | | | | | |
| Björn Freitag | Disco | Waltz | | | | | | | | | |
