= Verliebt in Berlin =

German Telenovela

- Logo
- Created by: Michael Esser; Peter Schlesselmann
- Starring: Alexandra Neldel; Mathis Künzler; Tim Sander; Laura Osswald
- Opening theme: Nena — "Liebe Ist"
- Country of origin: Germany
- Original language: German
- No. of seasons: 2
- No. of episodes: 645

Production
- Producers: Markus Brunnemann; Rainer Wemcken
- Production locations: Berlin, Germany
- Running time: 30 min (approx. 24 min)

Original release
- Network: Sat.1
- Release: 28 February 2005 – 12 October 2007

Related
- German adaption of Betty la Fea

Verliebt in Berlin (German pun for In Love in/with Berlin; abbreviation: ViB) is a Golden Rose-winning German telenovela, starring Alexandra Neldel, along with Mathis Künzler, Tim Sander, and Laura Osswald. It premiered on 28 February 2005 on Sat.1 in most of German-speaking Europe, with its final episode broadcast on 12 October 2007. The series is an adaptation of the Colombian telenovela Yo soy Betty, la fea, written by Fernando Gaitán and produced by RCN TV.

The original season of the serial comedy-drama followed the life of the unsophisticated but good-natured Lisa Plenske (Neldel), and her incongruous job at the ultra-chic Berlin fashion house Kerima Moda; while the second season revolved around Lisa's ham-fisted but sly half-brother Bruno (Sander) and junior designer Hannah Refrath (Osswald). Lisa and Bruno's status as two "fish out of water" drove much of the story plot.

ViB was adapted into a Berlin setting by creators Michael Esser, Peter Schlesselmann and their co-team and co-producers Markus Brunnemann and Rainer Wemcken, whose production company Phoenix Film Karlheinz Brunnemann GmbH & Co. Produktions KG partnered with Grundy UFA TV Produktions GmbH to create the half-hour-long program for the German-speaking audience.

== Plot ==
=== Original season ===
David, Mariella and Lisa in the first season of the telenovela.

The plot is set in the present time. Elisabeth "Lisa" Plenske (Alexandra Neldel), a kind, intelligent, but naive and not necessarily beautiful young woman, grows up in the (fictional) village Göberitz, near Berlin, with her parents Bernd (Volker Herold) and Helga (Ulrike Mai). Lisa moves to Berlin and tries to get a job at Kerima Moda, a fashion company. There, she bumps into the junior chairman David Seidel (Mathis Künzler) and falls in love with him. She starts off catering at Kerima Moda, but manages to get promoted to personal assistant of Seidel. She works with him, however he does not really notice her qualities (much less herself as a woman), because he is engaged to Mariella von Brahmberg (Bianca Hein) and is also involved with various other women.

During the course of the series, Lisa manages to save and finally own Kerima Moda, rescues her boss David from death and the wrath of his then-fiancée, watches him break off his engagement to Mariella, protects the company from David's maleficent rival and stepbrother and Mariella's brother Richard von Brahmberg (Karim Köster) and his mother Sophie von Brahmberg (Gabrielle Scharnitzky), endures the antics of the secretary Sabrina (Nina Gnädig), falls in love with and gets engaged to Robert "Rokko" Kowalski (Manuel Cortez), while bearing the quirks of the chief designer Hugo Haas (Hubertus Regout) and helping his assistant Hannah Refrath (Laura Osswald), David's sister Kim (Lara-Isabelle Rentinck) and the runner boy Timo (Matthias Dietrich) with their love lives.

She is aided by her best friend Jürgen Decker (Oliver Bokern) and the cook Agnes Hetzer (Susanne Szell). In the end, she calls off the wedding to Rokko, marries David instead and sails with him on his boat to the Caribbean.

=== Second season ===
Season two centers around sympathetic conman Bruno Lehmann (Tim Sander), who is Lisa's half-brother. Bruno is on the run and lands up in Berlin to see his (unassuming) father Bernd. There, he starts to save the lifework of his half-sister Lisa, and Bruno starts to realize that his charm won't get him anywhere and that sometimes you have to work for your achievements. Also, he starts to fall in love with the young (and married) designer Nora Lindberg (Julia Malik). Because of bad ratings, Sat1 replaced Julia Malik. So Bruno is now fallen in love with Kim who is the younger sister of David Seidel and married to the evil Paolo Amendola . Since January 2007 Bruno Lehmann isn't the main character, who is in love with somebody, anymore. Instead it's the returned designer Hannah Refrath who is in love with him ...

== Background ==
=== Production ===
Most Verliebt in Berlin episodes were shot in two closed studios in Berlin-Adlershof. While switching between a range of 24 different sets, the team generally filmed one episode (each 25 minutes) per day; in addition, outdoor shots in Berlin were booked twice a week. Supervised by creators Michael Esser, and Peter Schlesselmann, 15 writers daily drafted a script for one episode. Nearly 120 crewmembers were involved in the shooting of a single episode.

== Awards and nominations ==
- 2005: Deutscher Fernsehpreis (German TV Award) for Best Daily Series
- 2006: Rose d'Or
  - Best Soap
  - Best Actress in a Soap — Alexandra Neldel

== Cast ==
=== Main actors ===
Actor	Role	Episodes	Year(s)
Alexandra Neldel	Elisabeth Maria "Lisa" Seidel, (born Plenske)	1–feature film, 519–534	2005–2006, 2007
Mathis Künzler	David Hieronymus Seidel	1–feature film	2005–2006
Volker Herold	Bernd Plenske	1–645	2005–2007
Ulrike Mai	Helga Plenske	1–645	2005–2007
Wilhelm Manske	Friedrich Seidel	1–645	2005–2007
Olivia Pascal	Laura Seidel	1–645	2005–2007
Hubertus Regout	Hugo Haas	1–645	2005–2007
Gabrielle Scharnitzky	Sophie von Brahmberg	1–645	2005–2007
Susanne Szell	Agnes Hetzer	1–234, 398–405	2005–2006
Bianca Hein	Mariella van der Lohe, (née von Brahmberg)	1–254, feature film	2005–2006
Nina Gnädig	Sabrina Hofmann	1–feature film	2005–2006
Stefanie Höner	Inka Pietsch	1–feature film	2005–2006
Karim Köster	Richard von Brahmberg	1–feature film	2005–2006
Alexander Sternberg	Maximilian "Max" Petersen	1–393	2005–2006
Laura Osswald	Hannah Lehmann, (née Refrath)	1–feature film, 449–645	2005–2006, 2007
Matthias Dietrich	Timo Pietsch	2–384	2005–2006
Oliver Bokern	Jürgen Decker	6–645	2005–2007
Lara-Isabelle Rentinck	Kimberly Frederike "Kim" Seidel	7–645	2005–2007
Bärbel Schleker	Yvonne Petersen, (née Kuballa)	8–393	2005–2006
Manuel Cortez	Robert Konrad "Rokko" Kowalski	226–feature film	2005–2006
Tim Sander	Bruno Lehmann	365–645	2006–2007
Julia Malik	Nora Lindbergh, (née Amendola)	365–448	2006–2007
Alexandra Seefisch	Doreen Vogel	372–645	2006–2007
Thorsten Feller	Paolo Amendola †	376–645	2006–2007
Matthias Gall	Sven Lindbergh	394–645	2006–2007
Anja Thiemann	Theresa Maria Funke	402–645	2006–2007
Susanne Szell	Lotte Hetzer	404–645	2006–2007
Daniel Roesner	Luis Rothenburg	419–645	2006–2007
Yvonne Hornack	Peggy Refrath	515–645	2007
Björn Harras	Tobias Refrath	540–645	2007
Dirk Schoedon	René Refrath	562–645	2007
Igor Jeftic	Jan Rothenburg	584–638	2007

=== Minor actors ===
Actor	Role	Episodes	Year(s)
Lilli Anders	Ariane Sommerstädt	4–645	2005–2007
Claudia Weiske	Gabriele Kamps	32–645	2005–2007
Susanne Berckhemer	Britta Haas, (née Paul) †	24–267	2005–2006
Clayton Nemrow	Lars van der Lohe	52–254	2005–2006
Gabriele Metzger	Traudl Decker	55–534	2005–2007
Jean-Marc Birkholz	Marc Trojan	72–645	2006–2007
Roman Rossa	Viktor Karski	76–150	2006
Shai Hoffmann	Alexander "Alex" Greifenhagen	133–319	2006
Matthias Rott	Boris Wudtke	148–233	2006
Axel Röhrle	Olaf Kern	301–329	2006
Ina Rudolph	Katarina Dorn	307–329	2006
Nora Düding	Angelina Martens	338–405	2006
Dieter Bach	Johannes Fuchs	339–522	2006–2007
Peter Raffalt	Martin König	386–406	2006
Katharina Koschny	Doris Lehmann	373–645	2006–2007
Axel Scholtz	Meister Pöhnke	490–636	2006–2007
Kristina van Eyck	Tante Carlotta Amendola	412–424, 640–645	2006, 2007
Roberto Guerra	Roberto Donatelli †	478–535	2007
Maike Jüttendonk	Judith Haake	498–645	2007
David C. Bunners	Maurice Maria Ming	529–582	2007
Mirjam Heimann	Susanne "Susi" Breuer	556–645	2007
Roberto Guerra	Giorgio Donatelli	626–645	2007
Claudio Maniscalco	Luigi	640–643	2007
