= List of R. I. S. – Die Sprache der Toten episodes =

The following is a list of episodes of the German television series R. I. S. – Die Sprache der Toten. As of February 7, 2008, 25 episodes have aired. After the first 13 episodes and lower than average viewership, the series changed airtime from 09:15 p.m. to 11:15.

== Season 1 (2007) ==
Season 1 features 12 episodes.

Num.	Title	Original airdate
01	Freund und Feind	March 25, 2007
02	Flucht in den Tod	April 1, 2007
03	Schlangennest	April 8, 2007
04	Vermisst	April 15, 2007
05	Tod auf Rezept	April 22, 2007
06	Das Gesetz der Serie	April 29, 2007
07	Königin der Nacht	May 6, 2007
08	Die Reiter der Apokalypse	May 13, 2007
09	Die nackte Wahrheit	May 20, 2007
10	Der jüngste Tag	May 27, 2007
11	Tödliche Grüße	June 3, 2007
12	Puzzle	June 10, 2007

== Season 2 (2007-2008) ==
13 Episodes being produced for Season 2.

Num.	Title	Original airdate
13	Ringbahnsaufen	November 15, 2007
14	Nebenwirkungen	November 22, 2007
15	Traumatisiert	November 29, 2007
16	Mohnblume	December 6, 2007
17	Falsch gewettet	December 13, 2007
18	Der Funke Hoffnung	December 20, 2007
19	Stille Wasser	December 27, 2007
20	Salto Mortale	January 3, 2008
21	Wettlauf mit dem Tod	January 10, 2008
22	Wahre Liebe	January 17, 2008
23	Zimmerservice	January 24, 2008
24	Irrwege	January 31, 2008
25	Die Augen des Todes	February 7, 2008
