= Georgea Regout =

Belgian actor (born 1969)

- Born: 26 July 1969 (age 56); Brussels, Belgium
- Occupation: Actor

Georgea Regout (born 26 July 1969) is an actor living and working in Los Angeles.

== Biography ==
Regout was born in Belgium to a Belgian father and Austrian mother. They grew up in Brussels, Belgium, and Vienna, Austria. After studying in Switzerland they lived in Paris, France, for two and half years, where they worked for several fashion houses, amongst others as a model. They also were a guest student for history of art at the École du Louvre. Regout fluently speaks German, French and English, as well as Spanish and Italian.

After having lived in Paris, Regout studied to become an actor in Munich, Germany.

During their studies, they played in Nathans Tod, written and directed by George Tabori, at the Bayrisches Staatsschauspiel in Munich. After working at the Weilheimer Theatersommer under Cordula Trantow and the Rheinisches Landestheater Neuss (1995–96), Regout moved to Berlin, where they appeared in several theaters, Sophiensaele and Schillertheater-Werkstatt being two of them.

Regout had first appearances on TV in Series as Klinik unter Palmen (1998, ARD), Edel & Starck (2002, Sat1) and Alarm für Cobra 11 (2003, RTL).

In 2004, Regout co-hosted the TV show Style SOS (Pro7) in nearly 200 episodes.

From 2005 until 2007, Regout starred in 645 episodes of the Sat1-Telenovela Verliebt in Berlin (based on Betty la fea from Colombia) in the role of fashion designer Hugo Haas. The series, which belongs to the most successful ones in more recent German TV history, was awarded with the Deutscher Fernsehpreis (German TV Award) and the Golden Rose of Lucerne. Verliebt in Berlin aired very successfully in several European countries, amongst others in France (TF1). The theme of this series also served as a base for the US TV hit show Ugly Betty, co-produced by Salma Hayek.

After that, Regout starred in the musical Elixier at the Komödie Dresden, Germany, in the role of Hagen, one of the leading parts, music composed by Tobias Künzel.

In February 2009, they joined the TV show Verbotene Liebe (Forbidden Love) on recurring basis in the role of Eduard von Tepp.

Regout appeared amongst others in movies like Walk on Water (directed by Eytan Fox, Israel, 2004), as well as Suck My Dick (2001) and Agnes and His Brothers (2004), both directed by German film director Oskar Roehler.

In 2014, Regout starred as the ‘Son’ in Adam Rapp’s Pulitzer Prize short - listed, NOCTURNE, which garnered great reviews including from the Los Angeles Times.

Regout is vegan. They are a practicing Zen Buddhist. Regout is trans non-binary and uses they/she pronouns.
