= Laura Osswald =

German actress

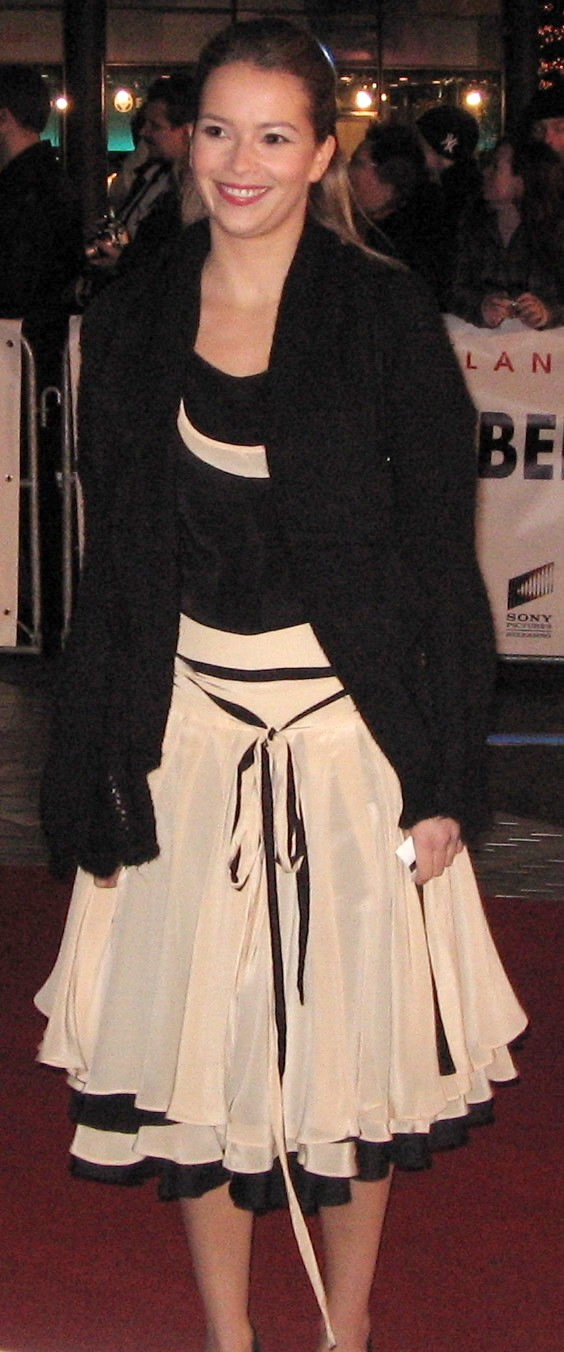
- Laura Osswald in 2013.
- Born: Laura Isabella Lolita Osswald; 8 March 1982 (age 44); Munich, West Germany
- Occupation: Actress
- Years active: 2000–present
- Spouse: Krishan Weber (m. 2014)
- Children: 1

Laura Isabella Lolita Osswald (born 8 March 1982) is a German stage, and television actress. She is known to have played in the television series Verliebt in Berlin and Schulmädchen.

== Filmography ==
- 2002-2005: Schulmädchen : Cara de Boni
- 2005–2007: Verliebt in Berlin : Hannah Refrath
- 2008-2011: Doctor's Diary : Gabi Kragenow
- 2013: Fack ju Göhte
