= Tim Sander =

German actor (born 1978)

Tim Sander (born 27 July 1978 in Berlin) is a German actor.

== Selected filmography ==
=== Films ===
- 2001: Never Mind the Wall
- 2003: Die Klasse von '99
- 2014: Joy of Fatherhood

=== TV ===
- 1998–2002: Gute Zeiten, schlechte Zeiten
- 2004: 18 – Allein unter Mädchen
- 2005–2006: Unter den Linden – Das Haus Gravenhorst
- 2006–2007: Verliebt in Berlin
