= Ruf! Mich! An! =

2000 novel by Else Buschheuer

Ruf! Mich! An! (Call! Me!) is a German novel published in 2000, Else Buschheuer's first. Widely described as soft porn, it was a best-seller, and although disliked by most reviewers when it first appeared, has since been much discussed by critics, some of whom argue that its seriousness was underrated.

== Background ==
Buschheuer is from East Germany and after German reunification wrote a column for a magazine for East Germans, Super-Ossi, under the name die rasende Else (raging Else), then became a TV editor and reporter. When she wrote the book she had been a weather reporter for three years, an unusually fast and successful adjustment to capitalism. The novel reads as if written by a West German, a critic wrote in Die Welt.

== Plot ==
Ruf! Mich! An! is set in Berlin at the end of the 1990s. The protagonist, Paprika, is a self-described sociophobe who lives in an "anonymous" apartment building in Daimler City on Potsdamer Platz that is "wall-to-wall autistics", celebrates her birthday with the one person with whom she is close—herself—and operates a successful advertising agency almost entirely by means of SMS exchanges with her assistant. She is characterized by "exaggerated techno-consumerism": she constantly channel surfs, conducts business in the bathtub and on the toilet using a headset, orders in almost all her food, buys ten jars of asparagus just because she finds a parking spot in front of the grocery store, then gives them to a panhandler, fantasizes about running barefoot through chocolate truffles, orders them delivered, then says she does not recall ordering them because she has "short-term memory loss due to excessive cellphone use". She shoots her expensive widescreen TV through the screen in a fit of pique and complains that "the world is unfair" because her TV is wrecked but Roger Willemsen is still alive. One of the two men with whom she associates, Dietrich, a bartender whose prime motive appears to be finding "something fuckable", describes her as "a consumer cripple with an amputated soul", which she admits to with pride. The other, Robert, is a concertmaster who can only get excited at the thought of long-dead film divas of yesteryear. Paprika's most characteristic sexual activity is masturbating to the late program on Arte; the first edition of the novel reputedly fell open at this scene. However, one day when she calls information, the operator gives her his own phone number. She enters an anonymous sado-masochistic sexual liaison with him recalling that in Laclos' Les Liaisons dangereuses: he calls himself Valmont. He summons her by SMS and abuses her, until suddenly he does not, and she falls apart from thwarted addiction, throwing her cellphone into the toilet, ripping the phone cord out of the wall, and drinking Laphroaig from the bottle. Instead of Valmont, an East German bumpkin, Maik, appears on her doorstep, so she shoots him and dumps his body in front of his own door for his wife, Mandy.

== Reception ==
Buschheuer conducted an effective marketing campaign for the book while deprecating it: she described it as "this garbage I coughed up" and posted her own one-star review from a fictitious incensed East Berliner at an online bookstore. Critics panned it; most importantly, in the Frankfurter Allgemeine Zeitung it was condemned as "one of the fattest, dumbest puffballs in the prolific jungle of so-called 'New German Literature'". The Berliner Morgenpost described it the next year in a review of Buschheuer's next book, Massenberg, as an "action-poor collection of deliberately provocative statements, hate lists and sex scenes, sneezed onto the page". It was generally seen as soft porn. Nonetheless, it became a bestseller, and an audio book appeared the following year.

Partly because Buschheuer was subsequently a witness to the 2001 World Trade Center attacks and her online journal from that time was widely read and appreciated as good reporting, some, particularly in academia, have subsequently argued that the book was not taken seriously enough. In 2004, Kristie Foell judged it an up-to-date and recognizable critique of "degradation through Westernization". In 2007, it was the subject of a doctoral dissertation by Oliver Benjamin Ham in which he argued that it presents the "gendered body" of the protagonist as "the main mediator and battle field of the divisions and tensions in Berlin between East and West Germans". In 2010, Tabea Dörfelt-Mathey saw it as an incisive portrait of the 1990s, built up out of details and lists in a manner reminiscent of Bret Easton Ellis' American Psycho, with a protagonist who problematizes the female role: she acts like a man until in playing the part of Eugénie to "Valmont", she becomes weak. Dörfelt-Mathey saw the widespread negative reviews as responses to preconceived notions of what women should write.

In 2012 the novel was rendered in Leipzig as a drag performance scripted by Falko Köpp and featuring Mandy Cleenex.
