= Alles außer Sex =

- Also known as: Sex & More
- Starring: Annette Frier; Rhea Harder; Simone Hanselmann; Mimi Fiedler
- Country of origin: Germany

Alles außer Sex (Sex & More) is a German comedy drama television series which aired on the TV station ProSieben between 2005 and 2006. The German television premiered on 9 November 2005 with an audience of 2.9 million viewers. Thematically, it is similar to the American television series Sex and the City and the British series Coupling.

== See also ==
- List of German television series
