= Simone Hanselmann =

German actress

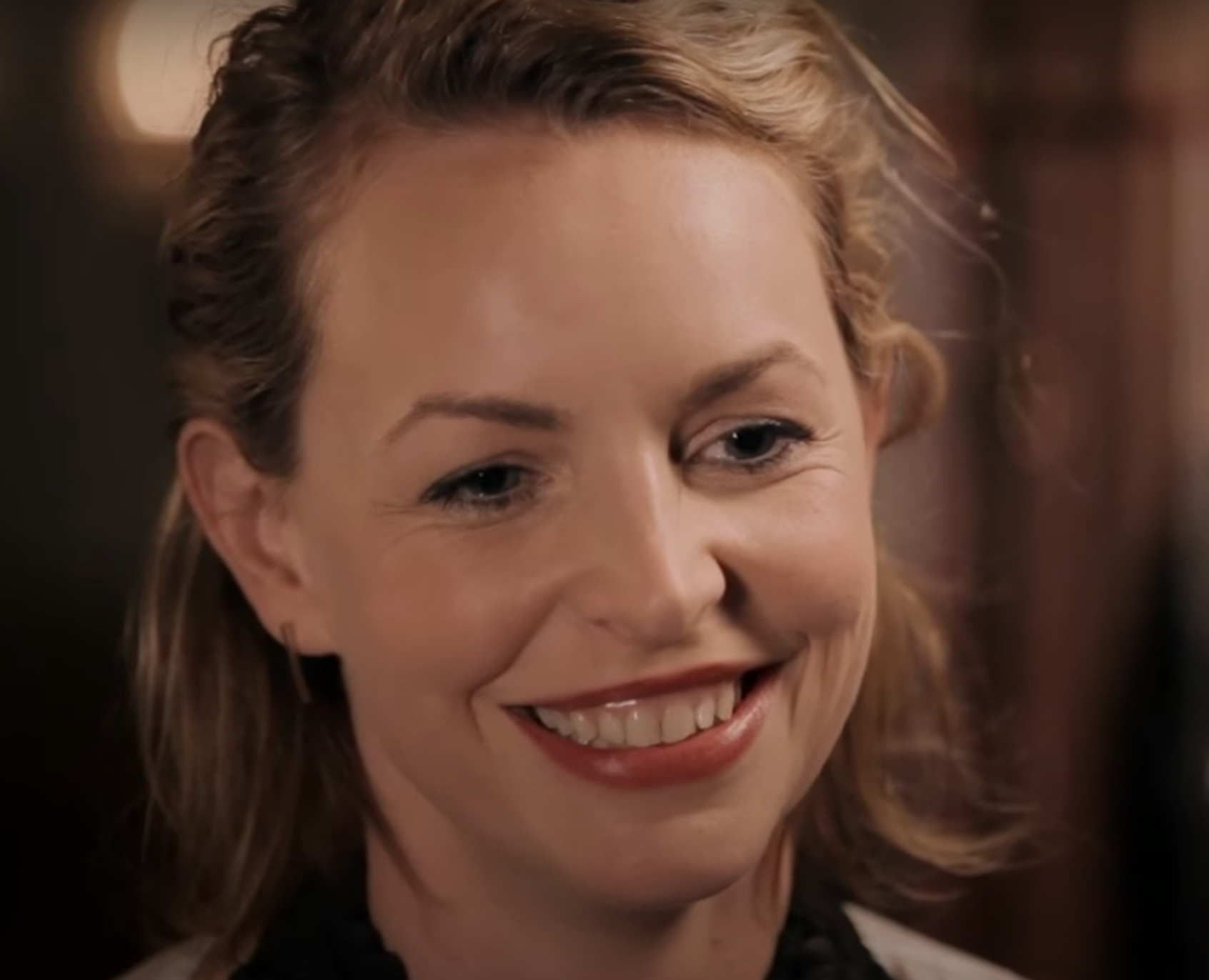
- Born: 6 December 1979 (age 45); Mülheim an der Ruhr

Simone Hanselmann (born 6 December 1979) is a German actress.

She started as a model and from 1998 to 1999, she played the role the bulimic schizophrenic model Anna Meisner (also Judith Unger and Susi) in the series Gute Zeiten, schlechte Zeiten.

She has worked in movies such as Flashback and in more television series like Schulmädchen or Alles außer Sex.

== Filmography ==
=== Films ===
- 2000: Flashback, as Lissy Schröder
- 2000: Girl
- 2001: 99 Euro – Der Hüpfer
- 2001: Zwei Engel auf Streife (Pilotfilm), as Laura Koslowski
- 2002: Schulmädchen (Pilotfilm), as Stella
- 2002: Rosamunde Pilcher – Flammen der Liebe / Paradies der Träume, as Monica
- 2002: Click
- 2004: Shark Attack in the Mediterranean, as Tina Stein
- 2004: Alles außer Sex (Pilotfilm), as Edda
- 2005: Polly Blue Eyes
- 2007: Reclaim Your Brain, as Anna
- 2007: Das Traumhotel: China, as Anna

=== Series ===
- 1998–1999: Gute Zeiten, schlechte Zeiten, as Anna Meisner/Judith Unger/Susi
- 2001–2002: Zwei Engel auf Streife, as Laura Koslowski
- 2002: Krista
- 2003: Berlin, Berlin
- 2003: Unser Charly
- 2004: SOKO Kitzbühel, as Michelle Walter, Gastauftritt
- 2004: In aller Freundschaft
- 2004-2005: Schulmädchen, as Stella
- 2005-2007: Alles außer Sex, as Edda
- 2005: Wilde Engel, as Britta Koch, Gastauftritt
- 2005/06: Tierärztin Dr. Mertens, as Alexandra
- 2008: Alarm für Cobra 11: "Schattenmann", as Prosecutor Saskia Ehrbach

== Theatre ==
- Therapie zwecklos (Köln)
- Café Lichtenberg (Köln)
