= Ulrike Mai =

German actress (born 1960)

- Born: Ulrike Kunze; 6 January 1960; Dresden, German Democratic Republic
- Occupation: Actress
- Known for: Appearing as Anna Mons in movies after Aleksey Tolstoy's novel; appearances in German series; acting in German theaters.

Ulrike Mai (born 6 January 1960 in Dresden, East Germany as Ulrike Kunze) is a German television, movie, voice and theater actress. Among her native German she speaks English, French and Russian languages.

== Life and career ==
From 1978 to 1981, Ulrike Kunze studied at Ernst Busch Drama School in Berlin.

In 1980, she became famous in the USSR after appearing as Anna Mons in Sergei Gerasimov's movies The Youth of Peter the Great and At the Beginning of Glorious Days after Aleksey Tolstoy's Peter the Great novel.

External image
- The Youth of Peter the Great movie: Peter and Anna Mons

Having succeeded her studies in Berlin, she acted in Magdeburg's theater until 1984 and then continued her performing career in Halle, Saxony-Anhalt.

In 1987, Ulrike Kunze got a job at DDR-FS (a state owned channel in East Germany).

It was the same year she married a German actor and director Jürgen Mai whose last name she took.

From 2005 to 2007, Ulrike Mai appeared as Helga Plenske in ViB series.
