= Coast Guard (TV series) =

German television series

- Country of origin: Germany
- No. of seasons: 17
- No. of episodes: 299

Production
- Running time: 45 minutes

Original release
- Network: ZDF
- Release: 19 April 1997 – 27 January 2016

Küstenwache is a German television series that tells the fictionalized adventures of a unit of the Federal Coast Guard, off the German coast of the Baltic Sea. It aired on ZDF for seventeen seasons from 1997 to 2016.
