= Faked death =

Leaving false evidence of one's own death

A faked death, also called a staged death, is the act of an individual purposely deceiving other people into believing that the individual is dead, when the person is, in fact, still alive. The faking of one's own death by suicide is sometimes referred to as pseuicide or pseudocide. People who commit pseudocide can do so by leaving evidence, clues, or through other methods. Death hoaxes can also be created and spread solely by third-parties for various purposes.

Committing pseudocide may be done for a variety of reasons, such as to collect insurance money fraudulently, to evade pursuit, to escape from captivity, to arouse false sympathy, or as a practical joke.

Faking one's own death may be part of an illicit activity such as tax evasion, insurance fraud, or avoiding criminal prosecution.

== History ==
Deaths have been faked since ancient times, but the rate increased significantly in the middle of the 19th century, when life insurance, and therefore insurance fraud, became more common. Life insurance payouts are often a goal for people faking their deaths, but most types of insurance fraud involve other subjects, such as thefts or fires, rather than faked deaths.

In the late 20th century, advancements in technology began to make it increasingly more difficult to simply disappear after faking a death. Such things as credit card purchases, social media, and mobile phone systems, among others, have made it harder to make a clean break with a past identity. Widespread use of facial recognition tools can connect new identities to old social media accounts. Other factors include a narcissistic desire of fakers to observe the reactions of others to their deaths, which may prompt them to check websites for information about their disappearances, which in turn could lead to their discovery through Internet geolocation.

== Motivation ==
While some people fake their deaths as a prank, self-promotion effort, or to get a clean start, the most common motivations are money or a need to escape an abusive relationship. Men are more likely to fake their deaths than women.

People who fake their deaths often feel like they are trapped in a desperate situation. Because of this, an investigation may be triggered if the person disappears, no body is found, and the person is in significant financial difficulties. Often, the desperate person has assessed the situation incorrectly. For example, John Darwin, known as "Canoe Man" in the UK, incorrectly believed that his financial difficulties could not be resolved through bankruptcy or by seeking legal assistance.

Many people who fake their deaths intend for the change to be temporary, until a problem is resolved. For example, John Darwin hoped that his wife could collect money from life insurance, pay some debts off, and then he could reappear later to pay the money back, perhaps with a fine and some jail time. He framed it as a sort of unconventional loan from the life insurance companies.

Daydreaming or fantasizing about disappearing can be a form of avoiding problems that people do not want to address, such as their dissatisfaction with their current situations. Faking a death in this situation goes beyond this common impulse to think about a different lifestyle and may be associated with manipulativeness, anti-social behaviour, or sociopathic tendencies.

== Methods ==
People who fake their own deaths usually do so in a way that there isn't a body to identify. It is often done by going missing or pretending to drown. However, drowned bodies usually appear within a few days of a death, and when no body appears, a faked death is suspected.

== Outcome ==
Although firm figures are impossible to identify, investigators can resolve nearly all of the cases they receive, and researchers believe that most people are caught. Most people are caught quickly, within hours or days. For example, Marcus Schrenker faked a plane crash to avoid prosecution and was captured two days later, after he sent an e-mail message to a friend about his plans.

Faking a death is not a victimless act. The people who grieved what they believed was a real death are usually angry and sometimes see the offense as being unforgivable. Accomplices, such as romantic partners and children, may be asked to commit crimes, such as filing false insurance claims or making false reports to the police, which can result in criminal charges. Those who are unaware that the death is fake may feel emotionally abused or manipulated. Rather than being happy or relieved to discover that the faker is alive, they may be angry and refuse to have any further contact.

== On social media ==
False claims of death, including false claims of suicide, are not uncommon in social media accounts. The people who do this are likely trying to get an advantage for themselves, such as more attention, likes, or sympathy, and lie about their deaths often "without thinking about the fact that there are people who would be upset, hurt or psychologically affected by the news of their death". It may be an intentional effort to manipulate other people's emotions or to see how people would react if they had died. Online, people have claimed to be dead as a response to real or perceived mistreatment on social media, and posting news of their death, especially their suicide, is a way to punish the other users.

Examples of faked deaths on social media include BethAnn McLaughlin, a white woman who claimed to be Native American under another name on Twitter, and whose deception was uncovered after she faked her death during the COVID-19 pandemic. Kaycee Nicole in 2001 represented not just a fake death on social media, but also a fake person; she was the fictional creation of a middle-aged woman, and one of the first internet hoaxes to pretend that a character was dying.

== Notable faked deaths ==
=== 1st century ===
- Yohanan ben Zakkai faked his death to escape from the Roman army.

=== 14th century ===
- Joan of Leeds was a nun who faked her death to escape from a convent.

=== 18th century ===
- Timothy Dexter was an eccentric 18th-century New England businessman probably best known for his punctuationless book A Pickle for the Knowing Ones. However, he is also known for having faked his own death to see how people would react. He paid his wife and members of his family with instructions to act. After the funeral he caned his wife for her poor acting by not looking sufficiently saddened at his passing.

=== 20th century ===
- Grace Oakeshott, British women's rights activist, faked her death in 1907 to get out of her marriage. She lived the remainder of her life in New Zealand and died in 1929.
- Violet Charlesworth, a British fraudster, faked her death in 1909 to escape payment of debts. She was sentenced to three years in prison and released in 1912.
- C. J. De Garis, an Australian aviator and entrepreneur, faked his death in 1925 and became the subject on an eight-day nationwide search, before being spotted on a ship in New Zealand. He committed suicide in 1926.
- Aleister Crowley, English occultist and author, faked his death in 1930 in Portugal aided by Portuguese poet Fernando Pessoa, and then appeared three weeks later publicly in Berlin. Crowley died in 1947.
- Alfred Rouse, an English murderer, set his own car on fire in 1930 with a different man inside, in an attempt to convince the police that Rouse had died in the vehicle. He was arrested and convicted, and executed in 1931. The identity of the victim remains unknown.
- Aleksandr Uspensky, Russian government official, faked his own suicide in 1938 in an attempt to avoid capture by Soviet authority during the Great Purge. He was captured in 1939 and executed in 1940.
- Ferdinand Waldo Demara, American fraudster, faked his death in 1942. He died in 1982.
- Horst Kopkow, German SS major and war criminal, was declared dead by his MI6 handlers in January 1948. In reality he had been relocated to West Germany, where he died in 1996.
- Juan Pujol García, Spanish spy, faked his death from malaria in Angola in 1949, with help from the British spy agency MI5. He lived the remainder of his life in Venezuela and died in 1988.
- Lawrence Joseph Bader, an American salesperson, disappeared in 1957 and was presumed dead. He was found alive five years later assuming the identity of "John 'Fritz' Johnson", working as a local TV personality in Omaha, Nebraska. He either had amnesia of his life or was a hoaxer. He died in 1966, aged 39.
- Ken Kesey, American novelist, faked his suicide in 1966. He died in 2001.
- John Allen, a British criminal and murderer, faked his own death in 1966 to avoid prosecution for crimes he had committed. Allen died in 2015.
- John Stonehouse, a British politician who in November 1974 faked his own suicide by drowning to escape financial difficulties and live with his mistress. One month later, he was discovered in Australia. Police there initially thought he might be Lord Lucan (who had disappeared only a few weeks earlier, after being suspected of murder) and jailed him. Sent back to Britain, he was convicted and sentenced to seven years in prison for fraud.
- Jerry Balisok, an American professional wrestler, successfully convinced the FBI that he had died in 1978 in the Jonestown Massacre to avoid fraud charges, assuming the identity "Ricky Allen Wetta". A decade later, Wetta was arrested and convicted for attempted murder, at which point he was determined to be Balisok. Balisok died in 2013 while in prison for an unrelated crime.
- Audrey Marie Hilley, an American murderer, jumped bail in 1979 and lived under the assumed identity of Robbi Hannon. In 1982, under a different alias, she announced the death of Hannon. She was captured and imprisoned, and died in 1987.
- Robert Lenkiewicz, a British artist, had his death falsely announced to the newspapers in 1981. In reality he was in hiding with his friend Peregrine Eliot, 10th Earl of St Germans. Lenkiewicz later stated that he engineered the stunt because it was the closest he could get to knowing what it was like to be dead.
- Sukumara Kurup, an Indian who faked his own death by placing the corpse of his murder victim in his car and setting it on fire in 1984. The face of victim was charred beforehand to prevent identification. He did it to collect the money insured on his name. The police identified the victim and his accomplices were put on trial. He evaded arrest and is in a fugitive list of Interpol and Kerala Police.
- David Friedland, a former New Jersey senator, faked his own death via scuba-diving accident in 1985 while awaiting trial on racketeering charges. In December 1987, he was arrested by officials in Maldives, where he had been working as a scuba dive master and had posed in scuba gear for a picture post card. He eventually was returned to the United States and served nine years in prison. Friedland died in 2022.
- Charles Peter Mule, a Louisiana policeman, was charged with 29 counts related to the rape and molestation of several young girls in 1988. After being released on bail, Mule left his truck alongside a bridge and sent a note to his police department. His claimed suicide was ruled inconclusive after police failed to find a corpse in the river, and a hiker reported to police that a man had opened fire on him without warning and whose description matched Mule's. After the case was profiled on the television show Unsolved Mysteries, Mule was captured.
- Philip Sessarego, British author, faked his death by car bomb in Croatia in 1991 for unknown reasons, and lived under an assumed name for the next 17 years, with his own family only learning he was alive when he appeared in a 2001 TV interview. He died of an accidental poisoning in 2008.
- Russell Causley, a British man, faked his death by jumping off a ferry off the coast of Guernsey in 1993 as part of an insurance scam. His scheme was soon uncovered and he was jailed for fraud; this led to the police re-opening an investigation into the disappearance of his partner Carole Packman, who Causley would be convicted of murdering in 1996.
- Francisco Paesa, an agent of Centro Nacional de Inteligencia, the Spanish secret service, faked a fatal cardiac arrest in 1998 in Thailand, after having tricked Luis Roldán, known for being the general of the Spanish Civil Guard when a big scandal of corruption arose in 1993, into stealing all the money that Roldán had previously stolen in that case. He appeared in 2004. During these years, he opened an offshore company, which was exposed thanks to the leaking of the Panama Papers.
- Friedrich Gulda, Austrian pianist, falsely announced his death in 1999 to create publicity for a following "resurrection concert". He died in 2000.

=== 21st century ===
- John Darwin, a former teacher and prison officer from Hartlepool, England, faked his own death on 21 March 2002 by canoeing out to sea and disappearing. His ruse fell apart in 2006 when a simple Google search revealed a photo of him buying a house in Panama. Darwin and his wife, Anne, were arrested and charged with fraud, deception, and money laundering related to the life insurance payout of £250,000. They were each sentenced to more than six years in prison, and all their property sold, and all their money taken, including his pension, to repay.
- Clayton Counts, American musician, reported himself dead on his website in 2007 as a prank. He died in 2016.
- Samuel Israel III, an American hedge fund manager who was facing 22 years in prison for financial malfeasance and fraud, left his truck and a suicide note at a bridge in an attempted fake suicide in April 2008. Authorities suspected that his suicide was faked since, among other things, passersby reported that a car had picked someone up on the bridge from near Israel's abandoned car. Two years were added to Israel's sentence for obstruction of justice, which he is currently serving.
- Marcus Schrenker, a financial manager from Fishers, Indiana, US, was charged with defrauding clients, and in 2009 attempted to fake his own death in a plane crash to avoid prosecution. The plane crash was quickly discovered to be staged, and Schrenker was captured two days later, after he sent an e-mail message to a friend about his plans. In October 2010, after pleading guilty to state charges, Schrenker was sentenced to 10 years in prison and was fined $633,781.
- Luke Rhinehart, American author, an email was sent out in August 2012 to 25 of Rhinehart's friends, informing them of his death. This was actually a hoax and a prank played by Rhinehart himself. The reactions of Rhinehart's 25 friends ranged from sorrow to gratitude and amusement. He died in 2020.
- Chandra Mohan Sharma, Indian activist, murdered a homeless man, placed the body in his own car, and set the car on fire, in an attempt at faking his death in 2014 to get out of his marriage. He was captured by police later that year.
- Arkady Babchenko, a Russian journalist living in Ukraine who in 2018 faked his own assassination, which was widely reported in the international press, as part of a sting operation aimed at exposing an agent sent to kill him. Babchenko's appearance at a press conference the day after his "death" caused an international sensation.
- Nicholas Alahverdian, an American child welfare advocate and convicted sex offender from Rhode Island, purported to have died in February 2020, was found alive by police in Scotland in January 2022. He died in 2026.
- Kim Avis, a busker and market trader from Inverness, Scotland and a local celebrity. In 2019, he was reported dead in California but in the 2024 BBC Two documentary, Disclosure: Dead Man Running reporter and Inverness local Myles Bonnar uncovered evidence that Avis faked his death to evade charges of sexual assault.
- Ziz LaSota, leader of the techno-rationalist, vegan, transhuman Zizian cult, faked her death in 2022. LaSota was later arrested by police during a string of murders by the Zizians.
- Lil Tay, a social media creator, was reported dead in 2023 and then confirmed to be alive; she later accused her father of faking her death.

== Conspiracy theories and false speculation ==
On occasion, when a prominent public figure such as a singer or political leader dies, there are rumors that the figure in question did not actually die, but faked their death. These theories are all considered fringe theories. Among the suspected faked deaths include:

- Adolf Hitler, dictator of Nazi Germany (1933–1945), has been speculated (including by writer Emil Ludwig) to have faked his death and escaped Berlin in mid-1945, the setting of his death as established by Western scholars. Hitler is claimed to have utilized established escape routes while leaving behind misleading evidence such as his dental remains (via dentures and a broken-off jawbone) as well as a body double.
- Harold Holt, former Prime Minister of Australia, disappeared on the beach in 1967 with the consensus that he had drowned. Different theories emerged suggesting he had faked his death for any number of reasons, most famously that he was a Chinese spy who had been collected by a Chinese submarine, or that he feigned drowning to run away with his mistress.
- American singer Elvis Presley died in August 1977. Rumors claimed that he faked his death and went into hiding. Many of these fans have claimed to sighted Elvis (whose face was well known) in various places around the world. The earliest known alleged sighting of Elvis after was at the Memphis International Airport where a man who resembled Elvis gave the name "John Burrows", which was the same name Elvis used when booking hotels. In 1978, Gail Brewer-Giorgio published a book titled Orion, a novel about a fictional Presley-like singer called "Orion", who in the story faked his death to escape the pressures of fame. According to Brewer-Giorgio, her publisher inexplicably had her novel recalled from stores which made her wonder if the real Elvis Presley faked his death. She then began an investigation and wrote another book The Most Incredible Elvis Presley Story Ever Told AKA Is Elvis Alive? where she claimed that Elvis was faking his death. In 2017, Elvis fans claimed to see the singer visit his home Graceland on his 82nd birthday.
- Towards the end of the reign of Alexander I of Russia, Emperor of Russia (1801–1825), he was increasingly suspicious of those around him and was more religious. He then caught typhus and died. Russian legends claim that the Tsar faked his death and left for Siberia where he became a hermit and took on the name "Feodor Kuzmich". Such legends existed during Kuzmich's lifetime. When Kuzmich was on his deathbed in 1876, the priest there to perform the last rites on Kuzmich asked him if he was Tsar Alexander. Kuzmich replied with a vague sentence that did not answer the question. Historians are skeptical of the claim that Tsar Alexander I was Feodor Kuzmich.
- After rapper Jarad Higgins, known as Juice WRLD, died from a drug overdose at the age of 21, many fans speculated that his lyrics suggested that he expected to die young and thus could have faked his death. For example, in "Legends", he sings, "What's the 27 club? We ain't making it past 21," referring to a group of famous artists who died at the age of 27 (e.g. Kurt Cobain, Amy Winehouse, Jim Morrison, Janis Joplin, and Jimi Hendrix).
- In the aftermath of Jeffrey Epstein's death in prison, unfounded assertions that he was in hiding at Zorro Ranch abounded.

== Pseudocides in fiction ==
- Romeo and Juliet (Shakespeare) – To avoid a forced marriage, Juliet drinks a potion that causes her to appear dead for 42 hours. This backfires when Romeo hears of her death, unaware she was going to wake up, and kills himself, leading to Juliet also killing herself.
- In Gabrielle-Suzanne de Villeneuve's fairy tale Beauty and the Beast, Beauty's and her fairy mother's deaths were staged due to an evil fairy's plot to harm them and their family members, one of whom being the Prince she turned into a Beast for rejecting her marriage proposal.
- In The Adventure of the Empty House, Sherlock Holmes re-appears to Dr. Watson several years after his presumed death grappling with Professor Moriarty at the Reichenbach Falls. Holmes explains that he survived the fall where Moriarty did not, but had to remain "officially" dead while Moriarty's lieutenant, Sebastian Moran, was still at large. This event was loosely adapted by Steven Moffat for the 2010s television series Sherlock starring Benedict Cumberbatch and Martin Freeman in the episode "The Reichenbach Fall". Holmes is the subject of Jim Moriarty's work to undermine him in the public's view to drive Holmes to suicide. Moriarty instead kills himself and Holmes appears to kill himself to save his friends, but survives with the help of his brother Mycroft Holmes and returns to his work in the next episode, "The Empty Hearse".
- Adventures of Huckleberry Finn – to escape both his drunken father and his strict legal guardian, the main character fakes his own murder.
- The Fall and Rise of Reginald Perrin
- Gone Girl (2014): In the bestselling book and film, the Dunne marriage is falling apart after the husband is discovered to be having an affair and the wife commits pseudocide and travels to the western U.S.
- The Partner (1997): In John Grisham's novel, attorney Patrick Lanigan fakes his death by staging a car crash and planting a burned corpse in the vehicle. He disappears with $90 million stolen from his law firm and assumes a new identity in Brazil, effectively committing pseudocide.
- House, M.D.: Dr. Gregory House, the titular character of the television series, fakes his death in the series finale by switching dental records with a deceased patient. Gregory House, based on the character of Sherlock Holmes, commits pseudocide just as Holmes did in "The Adventure of the Empty House".
- The Outsider (1953) by Richard Wright tells the story of Cross Damon, who survives a subway accident but leaves his coat on another man's severely disfigured corpse. Investigators assume it is Cross' body, and he takes the opportunity to escape his previous life.
- In What About Bob? (1991), the title character, Bob Wiley (Bill Murray) is attempting to keep in touch with his psychiatrist Dr. Leo Marvin (Richard Dreyfuss) and poses as a detective to Dr. Marvin's exchange staff to tell them that Bob committed suicide. While posing as a detective, Bob asks for postal information to Dr. Marvin's residence in Lake Winnipesaukee.
- Pretty Little Liars (2010): A high-school student fakes her death in order to rid herself of a stalker in the episode "-A". Mona Vanderwaal, another character, also attempted to fake her own murder.
- Despicable Me 2 (2013): While Gru, Nefario and the girls are fighting the purple minions, Eduardo Perez reveals himself to be El Macho, a villain who faked his death by jumping out of a plane while standing on the back of a shark, having strapped two hundred and fifty pounds of dynamite to his chest, into the mouth of a volcano, which would end up killing both him and the shark.
- Big Hero 6 (2014): When Hiro manages to knock off the supervillain's mask at a teleportation research on an island, he thought that the villain was Krei, but its true identity was revealed to be Professor Callaghan instead, who faked his death by revealing that he escaped from the burning building by using Hiro's microbots to shield himself from the flames which killed his student and Hiro's brother, Tadashi after rushing into the burning building to save him.
- The Simpsons: Homer Simpson fakes his death to take a day off from work in the episode "Mother Simpson". In another episode, Krusty the Clown twice fakes his death in "Bart the Fink".
- Grand Theft Auto V: This video game portrays a faked death. In the first mission "Prologue" Michael Townley (main protagonist) robbed a bank in North Yankton, then used a bullet hit squib to fake his death, and moved to Los Santos with a fake name "Michael De Santa".
- Alarm für Cobra 11 – Die Autobahnpolizei: on the ending of the season 6 finale "Ein Einsamer Sieg" (English: A Lonely Victory), Andre Fux was injured by the antagonist at sea. Andre is later rescued by a fisherman, who agrees to keep the secret of his fake death, and begins a new life with a new family. Fourteen years later, in the episode "Auferstehung" (Resurrection), Andre is reunited with Semir Gerkhan, his partner, who is still in the police. Semir learns that Andre's family had been killed. In the climactic scene, there is a car crash in the mountains. Semir tries to save Andre, but Andre falls off a cliff and dies. Before that, he gives Semir information about who killed Andre's family.
- Kathy Beale in EastEnders faked her death for 10 years and made a return on the 30th anniversary in 2015.
- Yakuza 6: Kazuma Kiryu faked his death to protect Haruka Sawamura and those around her and his friends. While under the radar, he helped Ichiban Kasuga in Yakuza: Like a Dragon by giving him the information he needed after a duel.
- Who Killed Sara? – Appeared a few times.
- In the James Bond film The Living Daylights, Bond fakes General Leonid Pushkin's death during a conference in Tangier, make to believe that General Georgi Koskov and Brad Whitaker's plan to assassinate Pushkin succeeded.
- In the James Bond film Spectre, Bond's adoptive brother Franz Oberhauser faked being killed in an avalanche alongside his father. In doing so, he took up the alias of Ernst Stavro Blofeld.
- Nora Prentiss, in which a man fakes his own death and is later charged with his own murder.
- In the South Park episode, Marjorine, the main characters fakes Butters' death and have him disguised himself as the new girl, Marjorine, to try to steal a paper fortune teller from the girls.
- In the Steven Universe episode "A Single Pale Rose", it is revealed that Pink Diamond, with the assistance of her Pearl, faked her own shattering at the hands of her alter ego, Rose Quartz, to make the other three Diamonds abandon the Earth colony. Her presumed shattering lead to a less prosperous second era in Homeworld, and the de facto end of the Gem War, which would only truly conclude after Pink Diamond's son, Steven, reaches the Gem Homeworld.

== True-crime genre ==
Several books and television shows are dedicated to the theme of faked deaths. These include the 2014 television show Nowhere to Hide on Investigation Discovery, hosted by private investigator Steve Rambam.

== See also ==
- Brushy Bill Roberts – American man who claimed to be Billy the Kid (1879–1950)
- Mock execution – Form of psychological torture
- Cotard's syndrome – Delusion that one is dead or non-existent
- Factitious disorder – Disease of mental health where symptoms are deliberately produced, feigned or exaggerated
- Skiptrace – Process of locating a person's whereabouts
