= Kim Gordon (disambiguation) =

Kim Gordon is an American musician.

Kim Gordon is also the name of:

- Kim Gordon (designer), American designer
- Kim Avis, British rapist who used a 'Kim Gordon' pseudonym
- "Kim Gordon & The Arthur Doyle Hand Cream", a song by Sonic Youth
- Kim Gordon née Selling, an Australian scholar of humanities and Tolkien scholar
