= Presumption of death =

Declaring a person legally dead in the absence of direct proof

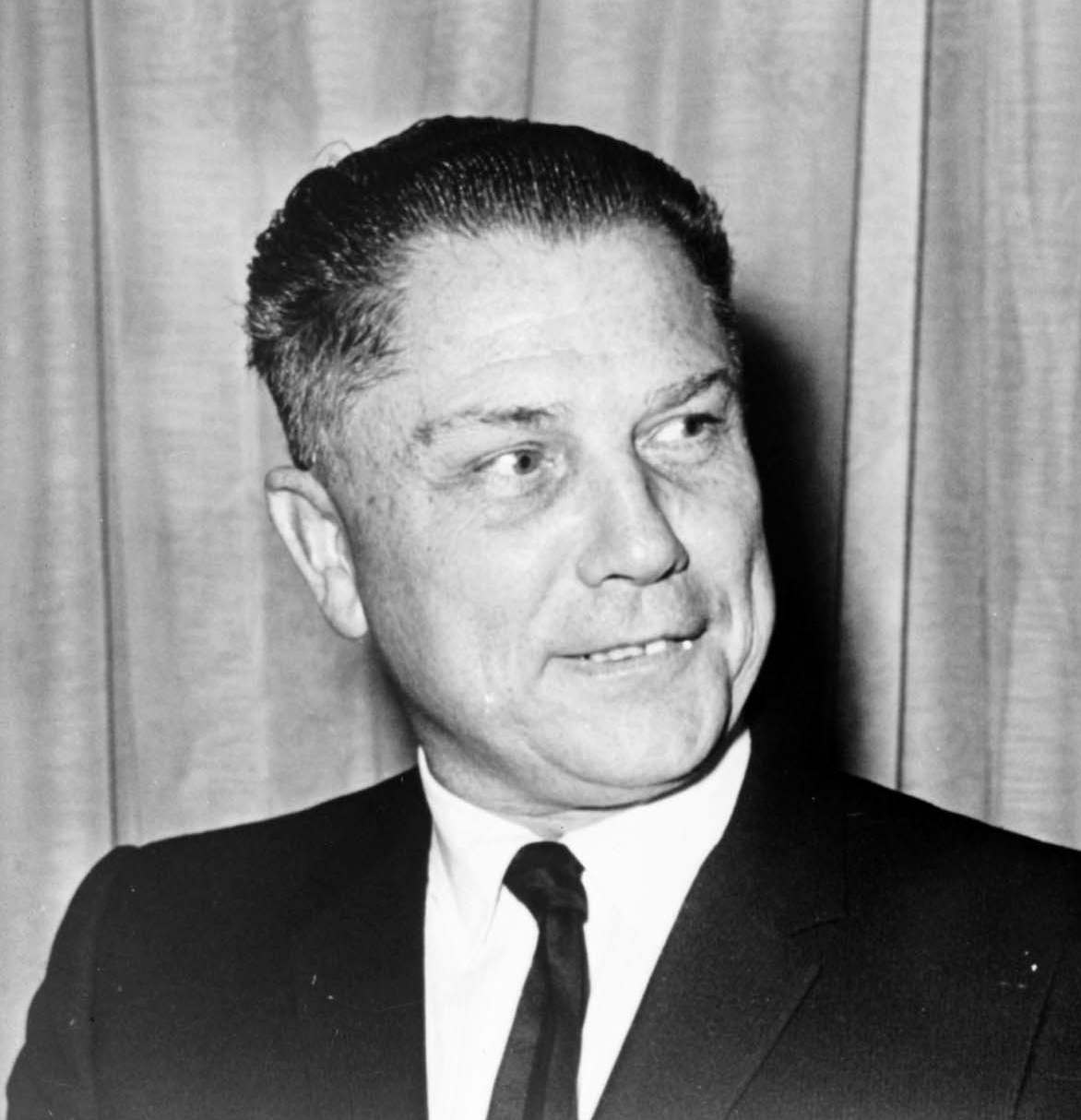
Jimmy Hoffa, who disappeared in 1975 and was legally declared dead in 1982

A presumption of death is a legal determination that a person is considered dead despite the absence of direct evidence confirming their death, such as identifiable human remains. Such declarations are generally made when an individual has been missing for an extended period of time and there is no reliable evidence indicating that the person is still alive. In some cases, a presumption of death may also arise after a relatively short period when the circumstances surrounding the disappearance strongly indicate death, such as natural disasters, military combat, shipwrecks, terrorist attacks, or aviation accidents.

The concept exists in many legal systems and serves several practical purposes, including the settlement of estates, transfer of property, payment of life insurance claims, dissolution of marriages, and resolution of guardianship or inheritance disputes. Without a formal declaration of death, relatives and courts may face significant legal uncertainty regarding a missing person's financial affairs, marital status, or civil rights.

In many jurisdictions, courts require evidence that a person has been absent and unheard from for a continuous period of several years before a declaration may be issued. Historically, the most common period under common law was seven years, though modern laws vary by country and circumstance. Some legal systems permit accelerated declarations when there is compelling evidence of likely death, such as eyewitness testimony, forensic evidence, or confirmed presence at the scene of a catastrophic event.

The presumption of death may become especially significant in cases involving high-profile disappearances. Examples include labor union leader Jimmy Hoffa, aviator Amelia Earhart, and several passengers lost during maritime and aviation disasters. In some historical cases, such as Jack the Ripper, the subject's presumed death is based not on disappearance but on the passage of time beyond any reasonable human lifespan.

== Legal aspects ==
=== Austria ===
According to the Austrian Declaration of Death Act (Todeserklärungsgesetz), the following waiting periods apply before a court can declare a missing person legally dead:

- General disappearance: Generally 10 years after the last sign of life. This period is reduced to 5 years if the missing person would have reached the age of 80 by the time of the declaration. However, the declaration is only permitted after the end of the year in which the person would have turned 25.
- Danger of death: If someone disappeared under specific life-threatening circumstances (e.g., natural disaster, accident), they can be declared dead 1 year after the event.
- Seafaring and Aviation: 6 months after the shipwreck or aircraft crash.
- Military disappearance: 1 year after the end of the conflict, if the person went missing during a war or wartime conditions.

The court establishes the presumed time of death based on the most probable date of decease. If this date cannot be determined, the law provides statutory dates (e.g., for general disappearance, the end of the 5th or 3rd year following the last sign of life).

=== China ===
Chinese law treats declaratory judgment of death and disappearance differently. Relevant provisions can be found in the Civil Code of the People's Republic of China, enacted in May 2020, in General Provisions (Part 1), Natural Persons (Chapter II), Proclamations of Disappearance or Death (Section 3).

Where a natural person has disappeared for two years, an interested party may apply to a people's court for a declaration of absence of the natural person. The period of disappearance of a natural person shall be counted from the day when a person is not heard from, until the day the individual is recovered or located. If a person disappears during a war, the period of disappearance shall be counted from the day when the war ends or from the date of absence as confirmed by the relevant authority.

Where a natural person falls under any of the following circumstances, an interested party may apply to a people's court for a declaration of death:

- The natural person has disappeared for four years;
- The natural person has disappeared for two years from an accident.

Where a person has disappeared from an accident, and it is impossible for the person to survive the accident as certified by the relevant authority, an application for a declaration of death of the person is not subject to the two-year period.

In the event of contradictory applications for declaration, meaning that both an application for a declaration of death and an application for a declaration of absence of the same natural person are filed by the interested parties with a people's court, the people's court shall declare the death of the person if the conditions for a declaration of death as set out in this Law are met.

The Chinese law specifically talks about the return of the absentee. The validity of the previous declaratory judgment of death is not imperiled by the sheer fact of return. The absentee or interested party (or parties) must apply for the revocation of the said declaratory judgment, then it can be annulled. The legal consequence of revoking declaratory judgment is essentially about restoration, i.e. the return of property and restoration of marriage. Chinese law restores marriage between the returned absentee and their spouse, providing that the spouse has not remarried or declared unwillingness of restoring marriage. This is quite unusual among the legal regimes around the world.

=== Finland ===
Under Finnish law (Laki kuolleeksi julistamisesta, "Act on declaration of death", 2005), a missing person can be declared dead by a court of law:

- When five years have elapsed since they were last known to be living.
- After one year if they have gone missing under dangerous circumstances or there are other reasons to suppose they are very probably dead. This could apply, for instance, to a person lost at sea, or missing in action, or if there is credible evidence a person has died by suicide.
- With no waiting period if the person is known to have been involved in an incident with an immediate threat to their life and there is no reason to believe they may have escaped. This could apply, for instance, to a person whose body cannot be retrieved or identified after a fire or an explosion, or a shipwreck in conditions where survival is deemed impossible.

In the case of missing persons, a declaration can issue only upon application by a family member or other person whose rights may be affected.

If a probable date of death can be determined, the person will be deemed to have died on that date. Otherwise, a date will be estimated, or if no estimate can be made, set no later than five years after their disappearance.

Any legal period normally reckoned from the death of a person shall, however, be reckoned from the date of the declaration, not the official date of death.

Aside from missing person cases, authorities will of their own initiative declare a person dead when one hundred years have elapsed since the year of their birth and they have not been known to be living for at least five years. As of January 2026, some two thousand such cases were pending, most of them persons who have emigrated from Finland and with whom the authorities have not been able to make contact.

=== Germany ===
According to the German Presumption of Death Act (Verschollenheitsgesetz), specific waiting periods must elapse before a person can be judicially declared dead:

- General disappearance: 10 years after the end of the year of the last sign of life. This is reduced to 5 years if the person would have reached the age of 80 by the time of the declaration. However, the declaration is only permitted after the end of the year in which the person would have turned 25.
- Disappearance at sea: 6 months after the vessel sank or the life-threatening event occurred (e.g., falling overboard).
- Military disappearance: 1 year after the end of the year in which the war or armed conflict ended.
- Aviation disappearance: 3 months after the aircraft crash or disappearance.
- Other life-threatening danger: 1 year after the life-threatening situation has ended.

The court determines the presumed time of death based on the most likely date or specific statutory rules for each category.

=== India ===
Presumption of death is governed by sections 107 and 108 of the Evidence Act, which allows for presumption of death for a person missing for 7 years to be raised in appropriate proceedings before the court.

=== Ireland ===
If there is strong evidence a missing person is dead the coroner may request an inquest under Section 23 of the Coroners Act 1962. If the Minister for Justice grants the inquest then the person may be declared legally dead if that is the outcome of the inquest. As an alternative an application may be made to the high court; before November 1, 2019, the general position was that a person needed to be missing for at least 7 years before a person could be treated as dead in the eyes of the law, but exceptionally may be earlier if there is strong implication from the circumstances the person is dead. This meant that their next of kin were denied any bereavement-related entitlements under any pension, life insurance or social welfare scheme. Since November 1, 2019, when the Civil Law (Presumption of Death) Act 2019, commenced, a court can make a "presumption of death order" if it is satisfied that the circumstances suggest that the missing person's death is either virtually certain, or highly probable. If such an order is made and not successfully appealed, it has the same status as a death certificate.

=== Italy ===
It takes ten years to declare a missing person dead. After ten years from someone's disappearance, a motion to declare the person legally dead can be filed in court.

=== Poland ===
Declaration of presumed death is stipulated in articles 29–32 of the Polish Civil Code and pronounced as a court judgment. In general, a period of 10 years is required to pass for a legal declaration to be made, with the following exceptions:

- no one can be declared dead prior to the end of the year in which they turn, or would turn, 23 years of age;
- the minimum time period is reduced to 5 years if the person would have turned at least 70 years old at the time of the declaration;
- if it is overwhelmingly likely that the person would have been a victim of an air or sea disaster or any other "exceptional circumstances", the period of time of the disappearance is reduced to 6 months; however, if the vessel is presumably lost, the time is counted from one year after what would have been the scheduled day of arrival, or from two years after its last known whereabouts;
- if a person is reported missing under other life-threatening circumstances than the above, the time period becomes one year since the conclusion of the life-threatening incident.

A court's declaration of death comes into effect retroactively and is subject to legal consequences from before the date of the declaration, going back to the assumed date of death, as declared by the court.

=== Russia ===
According to article 45 of Civil Code of Russia, a person may be declared dead only by a court decision, on the following grounds:

- They have been missing for 5 years
- If the person disappeared under life-threatening circumstances, which made it likely that he or she died from an accident, that person can be assumed dead after 6 months
- A military or civil person, who disappeared during a military conflict, can be declared dead no earlier than 2 years after the conflict is over

A legal date of death is considered to be the date when the court decision declaring person dead was made. If a person disappeared under life-threatening circumstances, the day of their actual disappearance may also be considered the legal date of death.

The declaration of death by the court has the same legal consequences as if the fact of death was proven:

- Dependants of the person become eligible for the state pension
- Assets can be inherited
- If the person was married, the marriage legally ends
- Personal obligations are terminated

If such decision was a mistake and the person later returns, the decision is nullified and the person becomes eligible to request most of his assets back. However, if the husband or wife of such person married again, the marriage will not be restored. His funds and securities, taken under bona fide circumstances, also cannot be requested back.

=== United Kingdom ===
==== England and Wales ====
===== Before 2013 =====
Cestui que Vie Act 1666 (Note: The citation of this act by this short title was authorised by section 5 of, and the second schedule to, the Statute Law Revision Act 1948. Due to the repeal of those provisions, it is now authorised by section 19(2) of the Interpretation Act 1978.)
- Act of Parliament
- Parliament of England
- Long title: An Act for Redresse of Inconveniencies by want of Proofe of the Deceases of Persons beyond the Seas or absenting themselves, upon whose Lives Estates doe depend. (Note: These words are printed against this act in the second column of the second schedule to the Statute Law Revision Act 1948, which is headed "Title".)
- Citation: 18 & 19 Cha. 2. c. 11 (Note: This is the citation in The Statutes of the Realm.); 19 Cha. 2. c. 6 (Note: This is the citation in The Statutes at Large.)
- Territorial extent: England and Wales

Dates
- Royal assent: 8 February 1667
- Commencement: 21 September 1666 (Note: Start of session.)
Other legislation
Amended by	Statute Law Revision Act 1863; Statute Law Revision Act 1888; Statute Law Revision Act 1948

Status: Amended

Text of statute as originally enacted

Revised text of statute as amended

Prior to 2013, English law generally assumed a person was dead if, after seven years:

- There was no evidence that they were still alive.
- The people most likely to have heard from them had no contact.
- Inquiries made of that person had no success.

This was a rebuttable presumption at common law – if the person subsequently appeared, the law no longer considered them dead.

Otherwise, courts could have granted leave to applicants to swear that a person was dead (within or after the seven-year period). For example, an executor may have made such an application so they could have been granted probate for the will. This kind of application would only have been made sooner than seven years where death was probable, but not definitive (such as an unrecovered plane crash at sea), following an inquest (see below). Such an application was specific to the court where it was made – thus separate applications had to be made at a coroner's inquest, for proceedings under the Matrimonial Causes and Civil Partnership Acts (for remarriage), for probate, and under the Social Security Act.

==== Presumption of Death Act 2013 ====
Presumption of Death Act 2013 (Note: Section 24.)
- Act of Parliament
- Parliament of the United Kingdom
- Long title: An Act to make provision in relation to the presumed death of missing persons; and for connected purposes.
- Citation: 2013 c. 13
- Introduced by: John Glen (Commons); Baroness Kramer (Lords)
- Territorial extent: England and Wales (Note: Section 25.)

Dates
- Royal assent: 26 March 2013
- Commencement: 26 March 2013 (in part); 1 October 2014 (rest of act); (Note: Section 22. The Presumption of Death Act 2013 (Commencement and Transitional and Saving Provision) Order 2014.)
Other legislation
Amends	Matrimonial Causes Act 1973; Domicile and Matrimonial Proceedings Act 1973; Family Law Act 1996; Civil Partnership Act 2004

Status: Current legislation

Text of statute as originally enacted

These processes were not considered satisfactory, and so in February–March 2013, the Presumption of Death Act 2013 (c. 13) was passed to simplify this process. The new act, which is based on the Presumption of Death (Scotland) Act 1977, allows applying to the High Court to declare a person presumed dead. This declaration is conclusive and cannot be appealed. It is recorded on a new Register of Presumed Deaths, and has the same effect as a registration of death. Death is taken to occur on (a) the last day that they could have been alive (if the court is satisfied that they are dead), or (b) the day seven years after the date they were last seen (if death is presumed by the elapse of time).

In England and Wales, if the authorities believe there should be an inquest, the local coroner files a report. This may be done to help a family receive a death certificate that may bring some closure. An inquest strives to bring any suspicious circumstances to light. The coroner then applies to the Secretary of State for Justice, under the Coroners Act 1988 section 15, for an inquest with no body. The seven years rule only applies in the High Court of Justice on the settlement of an estate. According to a spokesman for the Ministry of Justice, the number of requests received each year is fewer than ten, but few of these are refused. Without a body, an inquest relies mostly on evidence provided by the police, and whether senior officers believe the missing person is dead. One notable person presumed dead under the Act is the 7th Earl of Lucan (Lord Lucan), who was last seen alive in 1974 (although there have been numerous alleged sightings since that time), and whose death certificate was issued in February 2016.

The incidence of presumed death in England and Wales is considered low – in September 2011, it was estimated that only 1% of the 200,000 missing persons each year remained unaccounted for after 12 months, with a cumulative total of 5,500 missing persons by September 2011.

==== Scotland ====
In Scotland, legal aspects of the presumption of death are outlined in the Presumption of Death (Scotland) Act 1977 (c. 27). If a person lived in Scotland on the date they were last known to be alive, authorities can use this act to declare the person legally dead after a period of seven years.

==== Northern Ireland ====
Presumption of Death Act (Northern Ireland) 2009 (Note: Section 21.)
- Act of the Northern Ireland Assembly
- Northern Ireland Assembly
- Long title: An Act to make provision in relation to the presumed deaths of missing persons; and for connected purposes.
- Citation: 2009 c. 6 (N.I.)
- Introduced by: Sammy Wilson
- Territorial extent: Northern Ireland

Dates
- Royal assent: 2 July 2009
- Commencement: 2 July 2009 (in part); 9 November 2009 (rest of act); (Note: Section 20. The Presumption of Death (2009 Act) (Commencement) Order (Northern Ireland) 2009.)
Other legislation
Amends	Judicature (Northern Ireland) Act 1978; Matrimonial Causes (Northern Ireland) Order 1978; Civil Partnership Act 2004
Amended by	Civil Registration Act (Northern Ireland) 2011; Marriage (Same-sex Couples) and Civil Partnership (Opposite-sex Couples) (Northern Ireland) Regulations 2019

Status: Amended

Text of statute as originally enacted

Revised text of statute as amended

In Northern Ireland, legal aspects of the presumption of death are outlined in the Presumption of Death Act (Northern Ireland) 2009 (c. 6 (N.I.)). If a person lived in Northern Ireland on the date they were last known to be alive, authorities can use this act to declare the person legally dead after a period of seven years.

=== United States ===
The declaration of a missing person as legally dead falls under the jurisdiction of the individual states unless there is a reason for the federal government to have jurisdiction (e.g. military personnel missing in action).

People who disappear are typically called missing, or sometimes absent. Several criteria are evaluated to determine whether a person may be declared legally dead:

- The party normally must have been missing from their home or usual residence for an extended period, most commonly seven years
- Their absence must have been continuous and inexplicable (e.g. the person did not say they had found a new job and were moving far away)
- There must have been no communication from the party with those people most likely to hear from them during the period the person has been missing
- There must have been a diligent but unsuccessful search for the person and/or diligent but unsuccessful inquiry into their whereabouts.

Professor Jeanne Carriere, in "The Rights of the Living Dead: Absent Persons in Civil Law" (published in the Louisiana Law Review), stated that as of 1990, the number of such cases in the United States was estimated at between 60,000 and 100,000.

According to Edgar Sentell, a retired senior vice-president and general counsel of Southern Farm Bureau Life Insurance Company, almost all states recognize the presumption of death, by statute or judicial recognition of the common law rule. Some states have amended their statutes to reduce the seven-year period to five consecutive years missing, and some, such as Minnesota and Georgia, have reduced the period to four years.

If someone disappears, those interested can file a petition to have them declared legally dead. They must prove by the criteria above that the person is in fact dead. There are constitutional limitations to these procedures: The presumption must arise only after a reasonable amount of time has elapsed. The absent person must be notified. Courts permit notifying claimants by publication. Adequate safeguards concerning property provisions must be made in the case that an absent person shows up.

Some states require those who receive the missing person's assets to return them if the person turned out to be alive. If a person is declared dead when only missing, their estate is distributed as if they were dead. In some cases, the presumption of death can be rebutted. According to Sentell, courts will consider evidence that the absent person was a fugitive from justice, had money troubles, had a bad relationship, or had no family ties or connection to a community as reasons not to presume death.

A person can be declared legally dead after they are exposed to "imminent peril" and fail to return (e.g., a plane crash). In these cases courts generally assume the person was killed, even though the usual waiting time to declare someone dead has not elapsed. Sentell also says, "The element of peril accelerates the presumption of death." This rule was invoked after the attack on the World Trade Center, so that authorities could release death certificates. Although people presumed dead sometimes turn up alive, it is not as common as it used to be. In one case where this occurred, a man named John Burney disappeared in 1976 while having financial problems, and later reappeared in December 1982. His company and wife had already received the death benefits—so, on returning, the life insurance company sued him, his wife, and his company. In the end, the court ruled Burney's actions fraudulent.

== Reappearance ==
Missing persons have, on rare occasions, been found alive after being declared legally dead (see below). Prisoners of war, people with mental illnesses who become homeless and in extremely rare circumstances kidnapping victims, may be located years after their disappearance. Some people have even faked their deaths to avoid paying taxes or debts. Although a presumption of death can be overturned, restitution of property does not automatically follow.

== Notable cases ==
- Henry Hudson, English explorer, left adrift after a mutiny in 1611.
- Ambrose Bierce, publisher, author, disappeared during the Mexican Revolution in 1913.
- Arthur Irwin, former Major League Baseball player, presumably fell (or jumped) from boat sailing from New York City to Boston in 1921.
- Joseph Force Crater, New York City judge, disappeared on the way to a play in 1930, declared dead in 1939.
- Amelia Earhart, pioneer, aviator, disappeared during a transoceanic flight in 1937.
- Ettore Majorana, Italian physicist, disappeared at sea in 1938.
- Richard Halliburton, author and voyager, Pacific Ocean, lost at sea in 1939.
- Antoine de Saint-Exupéry, French aviator and author, disappeared July 31, 1944. Plane found in the sea in 2000.
- Glenn Miller, jazz musician/bandleader, whose plane disappeared over the English Channel, December 15, 1944.
- Raoul Wallenberg, Swedish diplomat and humanitarian, was arrested by Soviet troops in Budapest in early 1945 and disappeared. He was pronounced dead on October 31, 2016, by the Swedish Tax Agency.
- Paula Jean Welden, American college student who disappeared while walking on Vermont's Long Trail hiking route, December 1, 1946.
- Vincent Mangano, Sicilian-American mobster, disappeared April 1951 and declared dead on October 30, 1961.
- David Kenyon Webster, author, disappeared off coast of California in 1961, was known primarily as a World War II soldier with Easy Company, as portrayed in the HBO miniseries Band of Brothers.
- Michael Rockefeller, anthropologist, New Guinea, disappeared while canoeing in 1961.
- Joe Gaetjens, Haitian footballer, kidnapped by Papa Doc's secret police in 1964.
- Harold Holt, Prime Minister of Australia, presumed to have drowned in 1967.
- Jim Thompson, American fashion designer and entrepreneur based in Thailand, disappeared on a walk in rural Malaysia in 1967. Declared dead in 1974 after multiple extensive searches.
- Donald Crowhurst, businessman, suspected to have committed suicide in 1969 by jumping overboard from his boat. The boat was later found adrift and empty.
- Sean Flynn and Dana Stone, American photojournalists. On April 6, 1970, Flynn and Stone disappeared while on assignment in Cambodia. Their remains have never been found. The current consensus is that they were held captive for over a year before they were killed by Khmer Rouge in June 1971.
- Hale Boggs and Nick Begich, American politicians, whose airplane disappeared in Alaska in 1972.
- Roberto Clemente, Puerto Rican baseball player who disappeared after a plane crash off Luis Muñoz Marín International Airport on December 31, 1972. His body was never found.
- Oscar Acosta, lawyer and author, disappeared in Mexico in 1974. Friend of author Hunter S. Thompson.
- Richard Bingham, 7th Earl of Lucan, disappeared in 1974 after his nanny was murdered. Declared dead in 2016.
- Jimmy Hoffa, trade union leader, disappeared in 1975, presumed dead in 1982.
- Slim Wintermute, basketball player, disappeared while sailing in 1977.
- Helen Brach, Brach's company heiress, disappeared in 1977, presumed murdered; declared dead in 1984.
- John Brisker, basketball player, disappeared in Uganda in 1978.
- Frederick Valentich, Australian aviator, last heard supposedly describing a UFO over radio while flying a light aircraft in 1978. No wreckage or body was found.
- Thomas DeSimone, American mobster believed to have taken part in both the Air France robbery and the Lufthansa heist, disappeared on January 14, 1979, declared officially dead in 1990.
- Etan Patz, abducted while on his way to a school bus stop in New York City on May 25, 1979; declared dead in 2001. In May 2012, a man named Pedro Hernandez was charged with Etan Patz's murder based on a confession to police, despite a lack of physical evidence.
- Ian Mackintosh, British television writer and producer (Warship, The Sandbaggers, Wilde Alliance), was presumed dead in July 1979 after the plane he was flying disappeared over the Gulf of Alaska. No wreckage was found and none of the plane's passengers were heard of again.
- Azaria Chamberlain, Australian infant who was snatched by a dingo near Uluru in 1980, declared legally dead in 2012.
- David A. Johnston, volcanologist. His body has never been found since the eruption of Mount St. Helens in 1980.
- John Favara, neighbor of Mafia boss John Gotti, disappeared on July 28, 1980, several months after accidentally killing Gotti's 12-year-old son Frank. Favara was legally declared dead in 1983.
- Ronald Jorgensen, convicted killer in New Zealand, disappeared in 1984, possibly faked his own death.
- Carole Packman, disappeared from her home in Bournemouth in 1985, shortly after seeking a divorce. Although her body was never found, her husband Russell was later charged and convicted of her murder.
- Federico Caffè, Italian economist, disappeared in 1986.
- Suzy Lamplugh, an estate agent, disappeared in London in 1986 while showing a house to a Mr Kipper; her body has never been found.
- Clarabelle "C.B." Lansing, flight attendant ejected from Aloha Airlines Flight 243 in 1988 when the plane's roof tore off mid-flight; her body was lost in the Pacific Ocean.
- Nine passengers ejected from United Airlines Flight 811 in 1989 following a cargo door detachment; their bodies were lost in the Pacific Ocean, with at least one being sucked into engine no. 3.
- Teddy Wang, entrepreneur, Hong Kong, kidnapped in 1990.
- Chekannur Maulavi, Quranist Islamic scholar from Kerala, India, disappeared in 1993, now believed to have been murdered.
- Richey Edwards, guitarist/lyricist, Manic Street Preachers, disappeared in 1995. Declared dead on 24 November 2008.
- Larry Hillblom, businessman, founder of DHL, plane crash at sea on May 21, 1995, but body never found.
- Don Lewis, wealthy zookeeper who disappeared in 1997 and later hypothesized to have been fed to tigers by his wife, Carole Baskin, made famous by the Netflix series Tiger King.
- Scott Smith, bass player for Loverboy, lost at sea in 2000.
- Rilya Wilson, American foster care child, disappeared while under the care of a foster parent appointed by the Florida Department of Children and Families (DCF).
- Sneha Anne Philip, a New York City physician last seen on the night before the September 11, 2001 terrorist attacks, in which she was later ruled to have died.
- Bison Dele, American NBA basketball player missing from Tahiti in 2002; believed to have been murdered by his brother at sea.
- Ray Gricar, district attorney of Centre County, Pennsylvania, disappeared in 2005, declared dead in 2011.
- Natalee Holloway went missing in Aruba on May 30, 2005, and was legally declared dead on January 12, 2012. No remains were found.
- Jim Gray, computer science researcher, disappeared solo sailing near San Francisco in 2007, declared dead in 2012.
- Marquis Cooper, an American football player for the NFL's Oakland Raiders, went out to the sea off of Florida along with three of his friends, Cooper and two of his friends were never found. Cooper's wife filed for a Presumptive Death Certificate shortly after the disappearance. It is unknown if she was granted one.
- Madeline McCann disappeared on May 3, 2007, in Portugal.
- Malaysia Airlines Flight 370's 12 crew and 227 passengers, as the airliner was presumed to have crashed in the southern Indian Ocean in 2014.
- William Tyrrell went missing at his foster grandmothers home in 2014, he is believed to have been abducted but authorities are not certain about what actually happened.
- Ahmad Motevaselian, Iranian military attaché abducted and disappeared in Lebanon
- Valery Ilych Khodemchuk, worker at Chernobyl's reactor 4 on the night of the disaster, believed to have been killed in the initial explosion.
- Devonte Hart, African-American child known for being the subject of a 2014 image of him embracing a police officer. Vanished on March 26, 2018; he was believed to have been murdered by his abusive adoptive mothers in an intentional car plunge, and his body swept out to sea. He was legally declared dead on April 3, 2019.
- Karl-Erivan Haub, German-American entrepreneur, director and part owner of Tengelmann Group. Disappeared while ski mountaineering in the Swiss Alps on 7 April 2018, declared dead on 14 May 2021.
- Daniel Küblböck, German singer and entertainer. Disappeared from a cruise ship in the North Atlantic on 9 September 2018, declared dead on 10 March 2021.

=== Later discovered ===
==== Alive ====
- William Harrison, English landlord disappeared during a walk in Chipping Campden in 1660. Three of his servants were accused of his murder and hanged in 1661, but Harrison reappeared in 1662, claiming to have been abducted by Barbary pirates.
- Guillaume Le Gentil, French astronomer, declared dead in the 1760s after being lost at sea for 11 years. He actually died in 1792.
- José María Grimaldos López, Spanish shepherd disappeared in Osa de la Vega after an animal sale in 1910. Two men were accused of murdering him to steal the money and sentenced to 18 years in prison in 1918, but Grimaldos was found alive in 1926.
- Lawrence Joseph Bader, salesman from Toledo, Ohio, disappeared on a fishing trip in 1957 and was declared dead in 1960. In 1965 he was found living in Omaha, Nebraska, as "Fritz" Johnson, probably suffering from amnesia.
- Ishinosuke Uwano, former soldier of the Japanese Imperial Army, declared dead in 2000 yet presented himself as alive and living in Ukraine to the Japanese government in 2006.
- John Darwin, fraudster, faked his own death in 2002.
- Francisco Paesa, agent of Centro Nacional de Inteligencia, the Spanish secret service. In 1998 he faked a fatal cardiac arrest in Thailand, after tricking Luis Roldán, known for being the general of the Spanish Civil Guard when a major corruption scandal arose in 1993, into stealing all the money that Roldán had previously stolen in that case. He appeared in 2004. During these years, he opened an offshore company, later exposed in the Panama Papers.
- Natasha Ryan was discovered alive mid-way through the trial of the man accused of murdering her.
- Thabo Bester was believed to have committed suicide in his prison cell, but was found alive and it was later revealed that he had escaped from prison.

==== Deceased ====
- Steve Fossett, aviation/sailing adventurer, died in a plane crash in 2007, declared dead before remains were found in 2008.
- Emmeril Kahn Mumtadz, the son of the governor of West Java, Indonesia, Ridwan Kamil, was declared dead by his family on June 3, 2022, after being lost at the Aare, Switzerland on May 26, 2022. His body was then discovered on June 9 at the Engehalde Dam.
- Julian Sands, actor. Went missing on January 13, 2023, while hiking in Mount Baldy. His remains were found and he was confirmed dead on June 27, 2023.
- Michael Scott Speicher, naval aviator. Went missing after being shot down on January 17, 1991. His remains were found and he was confirmed dead on August 2, 2009.

== See also ==
- Unidentified decedent
- Cestui que vie Act 1540
- Cestui que Vie Act 1707
- Faked death
- Forced disappearance
- Legal death
- Declaratory judgment
- Death certificate
- List of missing people
- Missing person
