= A Pickle for the Knowing Ones =

1802 autobiography by Timothy Dexter

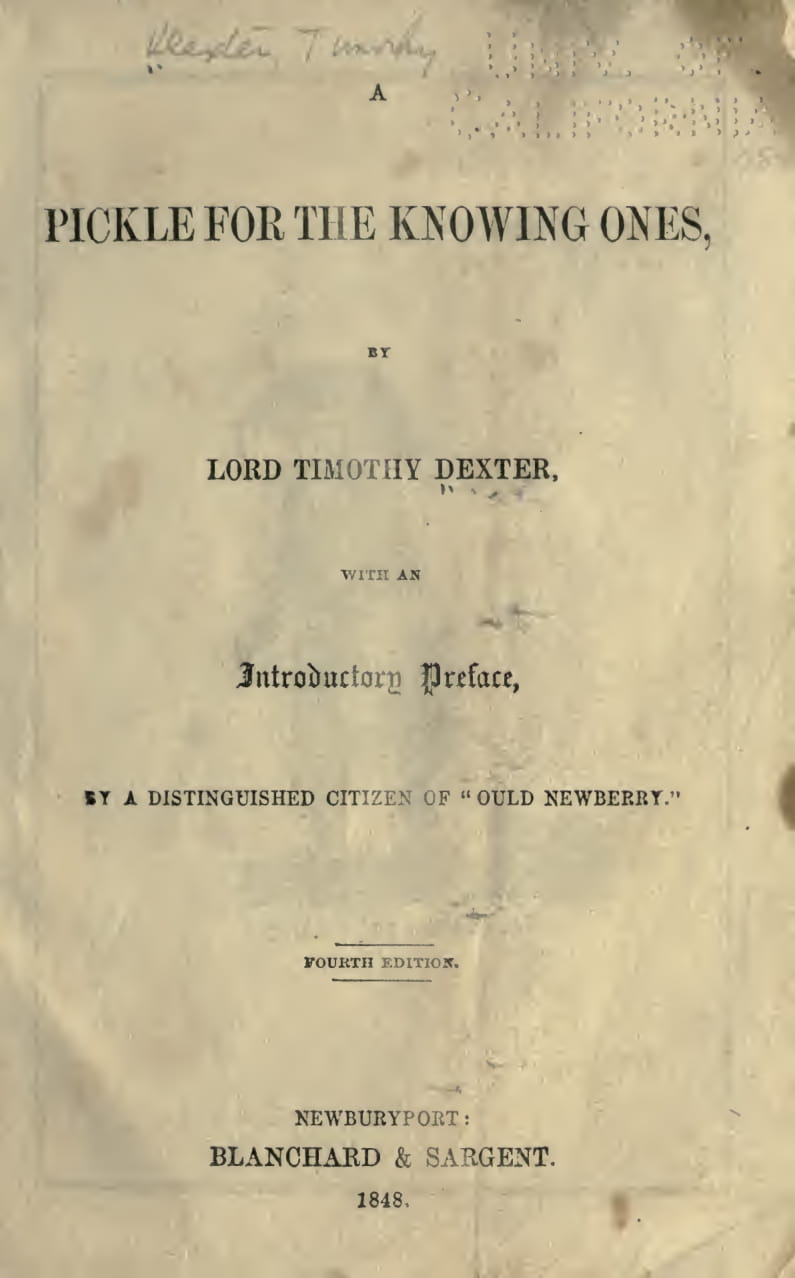
- Title page of the fourth edition
- Author: Timothy Dexter
- Language: English
- Genre: Autobiographical
- Published: 1802
- Publisher: Self-published
- Publication place: United States
- Pages: 32
- Text: A Pickle for the Knowing Ones at Wikisource

A Pickle for the Knowing Ones, also known as Plain Truths in a Homespun Dress, is an 1802 autobiographical book written by American businessman Timothy Dexter. The book uses spelling and grammar that are considered exceptionally poor, and contains almost no punctuation. Dexter was a rich businessman and an eccentric, known for gaining his wealth through ill-advised but ultimately lucky investments. The book includes complaints about things such as politicians and the clergy, while Dexter praises his own glory and at one point claims that he should be the emperor of the United States. The second edition is noted for containing pages of many punctuations in the appendix, so that the reader, in Dexter's words, "may peper and solt it as they plese [sic]".

A Pickle for the Knowing Ones's writing style was critiqued by poets and writers. The book was described as a "jumble of letters promiscuously gathered together" by Steven Gancerella in 2018, but was also used as an example in teaching typing.

== Author's background ==
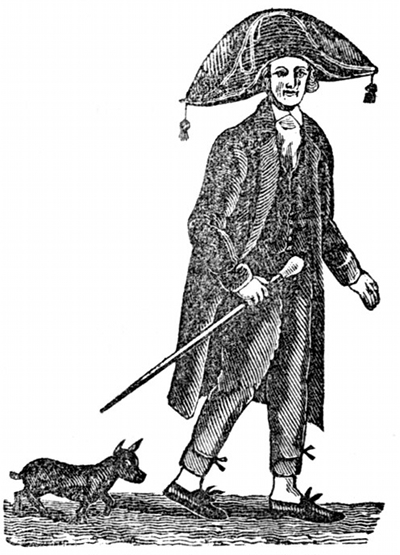
1805 engraving of Dexter, by James Akin

Dexter was born in Malden, Massachusetts, in 1743 or 1747, and began working as a tanner at 16. He moved to Newburyport, Massachusetts, when he was 21 and married a wealthy widow, Elizabeth Frothingham, obtaining a sizable fortune with the marriage. At the end of the Revolutionary War, Dexter purchased a large sum of Continental currency that was worthless at the time. Several years later, it had regained its value from prior to the war, making Dexter extremely wealthy. With it, he purchased ships and began a trading company.

In one instance, Dexter began selling bed warmers to the tropical West Indies, a move that proved to be successful when the captain sold them as ladles in molasses production. In another instance, Dexter bought a large amount of coal and sent it to Newcastle, an idea given to him by opponents as a trick, but it happened that Dexter sent the coal during a miners' strike in the town. Dexter's luck in the trading business soon made him one of the richest men in Massachusetts, drawing contempt from other businessmen in the area. Dexter published letters in a number of newspapers that, in his own words, "amused the public with the comical ebullitions of Lord Dexter's genius." Dexter wrote A Pickle for the Knowing Ones, also known as Plain Truths in a Homespun Dress, and distributed it to the public for free. The first edition was published in 1802 in Salem, Massachusetts.

== Content and themes ==
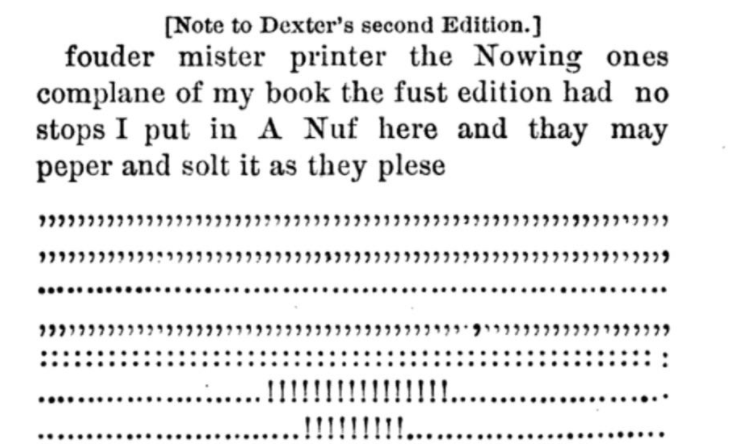
The appendix of the second edition, featuring punctuation for readers to "peper and solt it as they plese"

The first edition of A Pickle for the Knowing Ones is 8,847 words long. The book contains no punctuation, innumerable misspellings and grammatical mistakes, and randomly capitalized letters. An example of this can be found in the start of the fourth edition:

To mankind at Large the time is Com at Last the grat day of Regoising what is that why I will tell you thous three kings is Rased Rased you meane should know Rased on the first Royal Arch in the world

The text is structured like a series of letters; each section is signed "Timothy Dexter", "T Dexter", or "T D'r" variously at the bottom, with some containing headings like "From the museum of Timothy Dexter, esq." Throughout, Dexter complains about things like politicians and the clergy, while praising his own glory and power. He expresses his desire to make his enemies "hang there heads Down Like a Dogg bin After sheep", and suggests that what the United States needed was an emperor, and that they should "Call for me to take the helm".

After receiving complaints about the lack of punctuation, Dexter published a second edition in 1805, this time containing pages full of punctuation in the appendix. He tells the readers to "peper and solt it as they plese". Six more editions were published after Dexter died on October 26, 1806, containing letters and speeches by Dexter added by editors.

== Reception ==
The writing style of A Pickle for the Knowing Ones was heavily criticized and analyzed by poets and writers, such as John Marquand, who described Dexter's spelling as "hilarious". He further defined the text as a "pickle of words", but explained that the book was not meaningless, since it provided insight into Dexter's character. In 1890, poet Oliver Wendell Holmes Sr. sarcastically wrote in The Atlantic that Ralph Waldo Emerson and Walt Whitman should not have allowed Dexter to write the book, since his countrymen would believe that they "need not go to the Heralds' College to authenticate their titles of nobility", and that they should disregard correctly spelling words.

Described by Steven Gancerella as a "jumble of letters promiscuously gathered together", the book was also covered by The New York Times in 1925. The article drew a comparison to Benjamin Franklin's Poor Richard's Almanack and detailed its usefulness in teaching typing, writing "for the student cannot allow his eyes to stray from the text to the keys and make a successful copy." Additionally, Dexter and A Pickle for the Knowing Ones were written on by author W. H. Blumenthal in a 1932 essay about eccentric authors, in which he analyzed how readers and the general public should treat them.

== Sources ==
- Dexter, Timothy (1848). A Pickle for the Knowing Ones (4th ed.). Newburyport: Blanchard & Sargent.
- Gencarella, Steven (2018). Wicked Weird & Wily Yankees: A Celebration of New England's Eccentrics and Misfits. Guilford, Connecticut: Globe Pequot. pp. 1–14. ISBN 9781493032679.
- Knapp, Samuel L. (1858). Life of Lord Timothy Dexter. Boston, Massachusetts: J.E. Tilton and Company.
- Marquand, John P. (1960). Timothy Dexter revisited. Boston, Massachusetts: Little Brown.
