= Timothy Dexter =

American businessman and author (1747–1806)

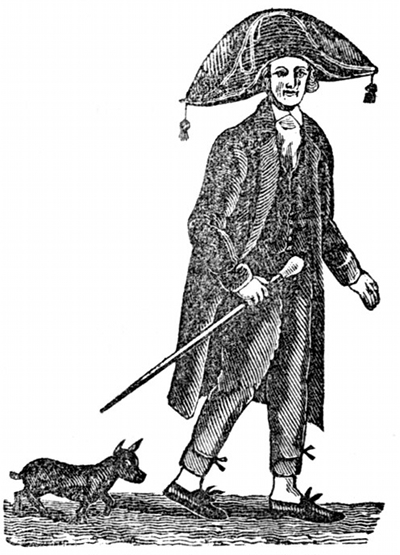
- 1805 engraving of Dexter, by James Akin
- Born: January 22, 1747; Malden, Province of Massachusetts Bay, British America
- Died: October 23, 1806 (aged 59); Newburyport, Massachusetts, U.S.
- Resting place: Old Hill Burying Ground, Dexter Family Plot, Newburyport
- Occupation: Entrepreneur
- Known for: Uncommon good fortune, eccentricity
- Notable work: A Pickle for the Knowing Ones (1802)
- Spouse: Elizabeth (Lord) Frothingham (m. 1770)
- Children: 2

Timothy Dexter (January 22, 1747 – October 23, 1806), self-styled Lord Timothy Dexter, was an American businessman noted for his eccentric behavior and writings. He became wealthy through marriage and a series of improbably successful investments and spent his fortune lavishly. Though barely educated or literate, Dexter considered himself "the greatest philosopher in the known world", and authored a book, A Pickle for the Knowing Ones, which espouses his views on a variety of topics and is notorious for its unusual misspellings and grammatical errors.

== Life and works ==
Dexter was born in Malden in the Province of Massachusetts Bay. He was from a poor family of Irish and English descent who had moved to the New World the century before. He had little schooling and dropped out of school to work as a farm laborer at the age of 8.

When he was 16, he became a tanner's apprentice. In 1769, he moved to Newburyport, Massachusetts. He married 32-year-old Elizabeth Frothingham, a rich widow, and he then bought a mansion with the money. Dexter set up a shop in the basement, selling moosehide trousers, gloves, hides, and whale blubber. Elizabeth also opened a shop that sold notions.

At the end of the American Revolutionary War, he purchased large amounts of depreciated Continental currency that were worthless at the time. At the war's end, the U.S. government made good on its notes at one percent of face value, while Massachusetts paid its own notes at par. His investment earned him a considerable profit. He built two ships and began an export business to the West Indies and Europe.

Because he was largely uneducated, his business sense was considered peculiar. He was advised to send bed warmers—used to heat beds in the cold New England winters—for resale in the West Indies, a tropical area. This advice was a deliberate ploy by rivals to bankrupt him. His ship's captain sold them as ladles to the local molasses industry and made a handsome profit. Next, Dexter sent wool mittens to the same place, where Asian merchants bought them for export to Siberia.

After he was jokingly told to "ship coal to Newcastle", Dexter supposedly took the joke literally and sent shipments of coal to Newcastle. Fortuitously, he did so during a Newcastle miners' strike, and his cargo was sold at a premium. On another occasion, practical jokers told him he could make money by shipping gloves to the South Sea Islands. His ships arrived there in time to sell the gloves to Portuguese boats on their way to China.

He exported Bibles to the East Indies and stray cats to Caribbean islands and again made a profit; Eastern missionaries needed the Bibles and the Caribbean welcomed a solution to rat infestation. He also hoarded whalebones by mistake, but ended up selling them profitably as corset stays.

While subject to ridicule, Stephen Gencarella contends Dexter's boasting makes it clear that he understood the value of cornering the market on goods that others did not see as valuable and the utility of "acting the fool".

New England high society snubbed him. Dexter bought a large house in Newburyport from merchant Nathaniel Tracy and tried to emulate Tracy's prominent mansion. He decorated this house with minarets, a golden eagle on the top of the cupola, a mausoleum for himself, and a garden of 40 wooden statues of famous men, including George Washington, William Pitt, Napoleon Bonaparte, Thomas Jefferson, and himself. The last had the inscription, "I am the first in the East, the first in the West, and the greatest philosopher in the Western World". Dexter also bought an estate in Chester, New Hampshire. There, Dexter recommended people call him the Earl of Chester. He offered one quarter to children who called him Lord Chester (equivalent to $5 in 2025), and dinner and drinks for adults who did so.

Despite his good fortune, his relationship with his family suffered. He frequently told visitors that his wife (who was alive) had died, and that the woman frequenting the building was simply her ghost. In one episode, Dexter faked his own death to see how people would react, and about 3,000 people attended Dexter's mock wake. When Dexter did not see his wife cry, he revealed the hoax and after the ceremony beat her with his cane for not sufficiently mourning his death.

Dexter became a well-known eccentric figure in the town, known for his desire for high office. He wrote numerous petitions to local officials, asking for his nomination for public office. In March 1776, he was appointed "Informer of Deer." His job was to inform the townspeople when deer were in the area and to enforce the laws regarding deer hunting. Dexter is said to have been content with and proud of his position, despite the fact that there were no deer in the Newburyport area. He was re-elected to the position every year until March 1788.

== Writing ==
At age 50, Dexter authored the book A Pickle for the Knowing Ones, also known as Plain Truth in a Homespun Dress, in which he complained about politicians, the clergy, and his wife. The book contains 8,847 words and 33,864 letters, but without any punctuation and with unorthodox spelling and capitalization. Dexter also signs his name at the end of each chapter, as though they were letters. One section begins:

'Ime the first Lord in the younited States of A mercary Now of Newburyport it is the voise of the peopel and I can't Help it and so Let it goue'

The first edition was self-published in Salem, Massachusetts, in 1802. Dexter initially distributed his book for free, but it became popular and was reprinted eight times. The second edition was printed in Newburyport in 1805. In the second edition, Dexter responded to complaints about the book's lack of punctuation by adding an extra page of 11 lines of punctuation marks with the instruction that printers and readers could insert them wherever needed—or, in his words, "thay may peper and solt it as they plese".

== Legacy ==
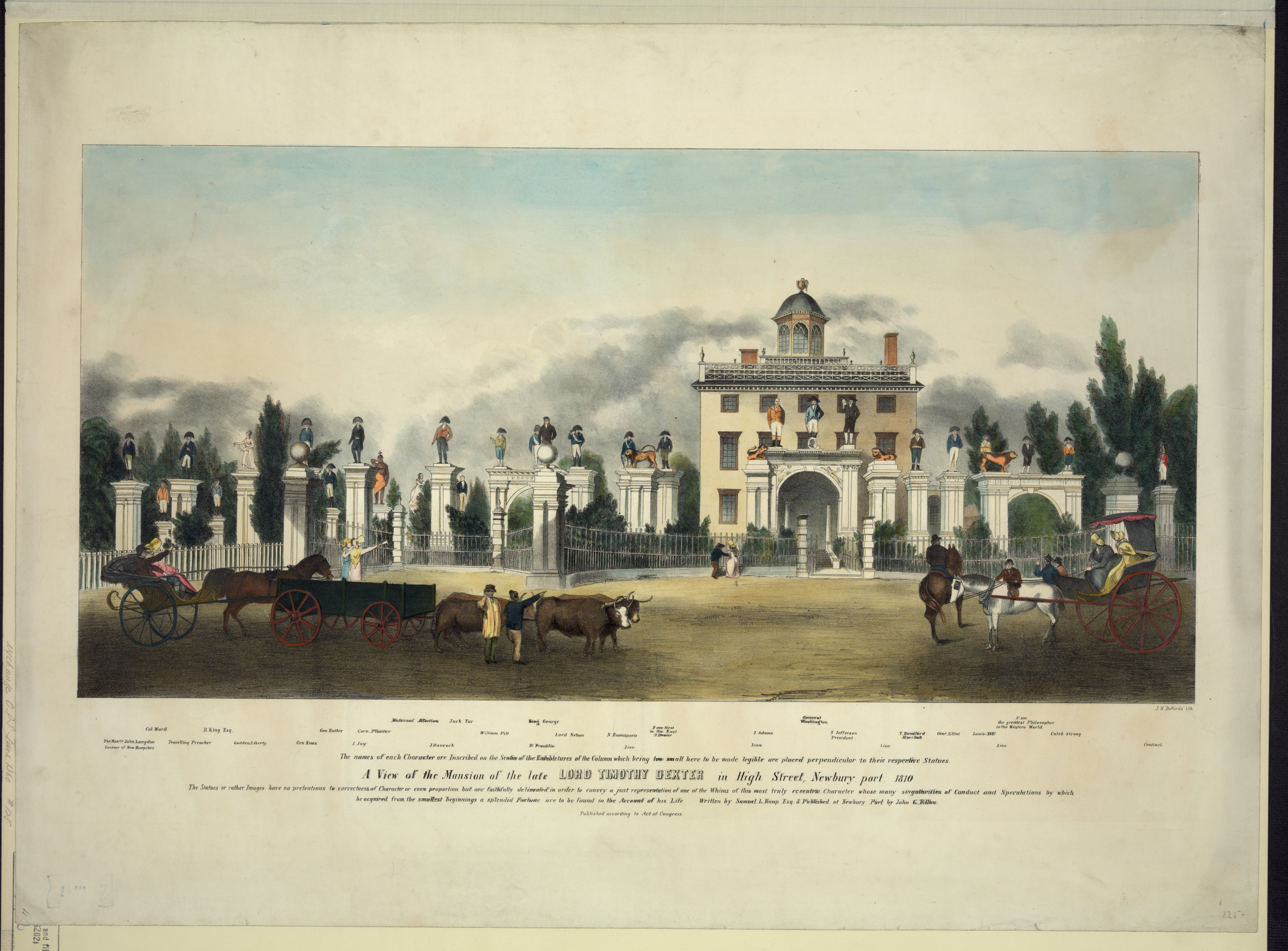
"Lord" Timothy Dexter House, Newburyport, Massachusetts

Some of Dexter's social contemporaries considered him very unintelligent; his obituary considered "his intellectual endowments not ... of the most exalted stamp". Dexter attempted to burnish his own legacy by enlisting the efforts of Jonathan Plummer, a fish merchant and amateur poet, who extolled his patron in verse:

Lord Dexter is a man of fame;
Most celebrated is his name;
More precious far than gold that's pure,
Lord Dexter shines forevermore.

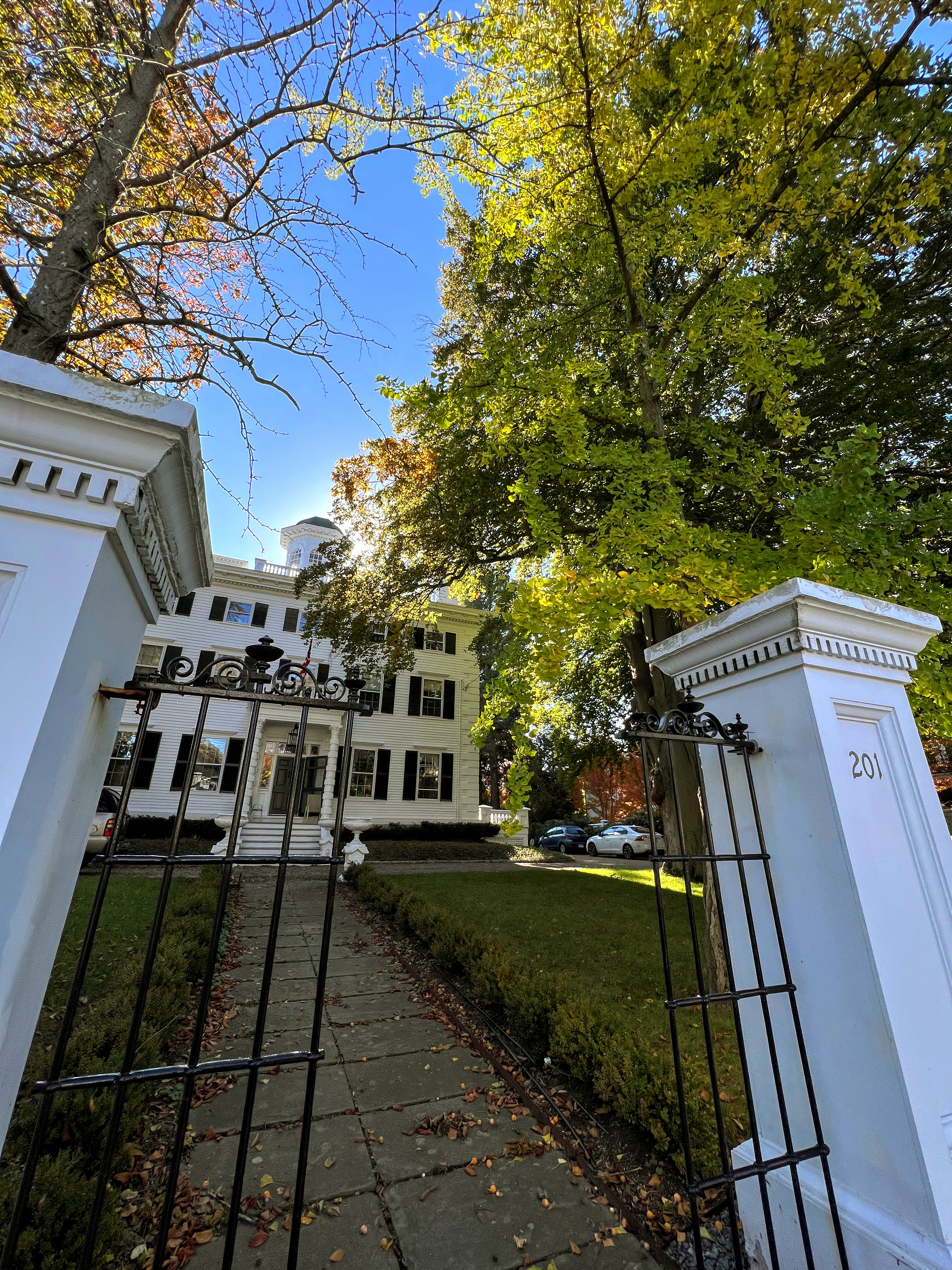
Lord Timothy Dexter House, as seen in October 2022

The Massachusetts Probate Office valued his estate at $35,027.39 (roughly equivalent to $825,929 in 2025) at the time of Dexter's death in 1806. After his death, Dexter's Newburyport house had its household furniture, gilt balls, and much of the garden statuary auctioned off on May 12, 1807. The Great September Gale of 1815 toppled most of the remaining statues, and the survivors were sold at another auction; some ended up being burned for firewood.

Ultimately, fewer than six of the original forty statues survived to the present day, being rediscovered during the Great Depression as a result of a Works Progress Administration survey; the most prominent one being that of William Pitt, restored by the Smithsonian Institution. It was loaned to the local Museum of Old Newbury in 1994, and its ownership was transferred to the local museum in January 2025. In 2013, a pair of carved figurines that once adorned the house's entrance, titled "Peace" and "Plenty", were put on auction by an Amesbury auction house, but failed to meet the $40,000 reserve price expected by the seller.

The Timothy Dexter House was briefly converted into an inn shortly after Dexter's widow Elizabeth died in 1809, followed by a succession of private owners. In 1984, William Quill, a Newburyport local raised on Johnston St, purchased the house for $200,000 and restored it. As restoration works came close to completion, a blowtorch accident on August 15, 1988, caused a fire that gutted the building, but original blueprints preserved by the Society for the Preservation of New England Antiquities allowed the house to be rebuilt exactly as it was. The Timothy Dexter House remains the Quill family's private residence to this day.

After Dexter's death, a street that intersects the High St corner where the Timothy Dexter House is located was named "Dexter Ln" in his honor. The first house built on the street was constructed in 1967. The Dexter Lane Project, a 16-unit affordable housing development, is currently planned to be built at 14 Dexter Ln.

== Sources ==
- Samuel L. Knapp (1858). The Life of Lord Timothy Dexter, with Sketches of the Eccentric Characters that Composed his Associates, including his own writings, "Dexter's Pickle for the knowing ones", &c., &c. Boston: J. E. Tilton and Co.
- Dexter, Timothy; Quince, Peter (1881). A pickle for the knowing ones: or, Plain truths in a homespun dress. S. A. Tucker. 36 pages. Archived from the original on July 29, 2020.
- Wilson, J. G.; Fiske, J., eds. (1900). "Dexter, Timothy" . Appletons' Cyclopædia of American Biography. New York: D. Appleton.
- Mitchell, Robbie (December 13, 2022). "The Ridiculous Timothy Dexter: Disappointed at His Own Funeral". Historic Mysteries.
