= Marcus Schrenker =

Former American financial advisor, convicted criminal

- Born: November 27, 1970 (age 55)
- Occupation: Financial advisor
- Spouse: Michelle Schrenker (divorced)
- Children: 3
- Convictions: June 5, 2009 (federal, pleaded guilty); October 7, 2010 (state, pleaded guilty)
- Criminal charges: Illegal destruction of an aircraft, deceiving the Coast Guard (federal), securities fraud, operating as an investment banker without being registered (state)
- Penalty: 4 1/4 years in prison and $905,000 fine (federal); 10 years in prison (consecutive) and fines of $633,781 (state)

Marcus Schrenker (born November 27, 1970) is a former American financial advisor. In 2009, he attempted to fake his own death due to personal, financial, and legal troubles. As a result, he was the subject of a multi-state, three-day manhunt.

After pleading guilty to federal charges he was sentenced to 51 months in prison and fined $905,000 in June 2009. In October 2010, after pleading guilty to state charges, he was sentenced to 10 additional and consecutive years in prison and fined $633,781.

== Background ==
Schrenker grew up in Merrillville, Indiana, and attended Purdue University, where he met his wife.

Prior to January 2009, Schrenker lived with his wife and three children in a $1 million waterfront house in Geist, a wealthy suburb of Indianapolis. He owned a plane and a Lexus.

Schrenker was listed as the owner of three companies: Heritage Wealth Management Inc. (HWM), Icon Wealth Management, and Heritage Insurance Services, all listed at the same address. In December 2008 Schrenker and HWM were sued by another company that was trying to get back $1.4 million for commissions it had paid to Schrenker for selling insurance and annuity policies.

On December 30, 2008, his wife filed for divorce because he had been having an affair with a woman at the airport where he kept his plane. The next day, his Indiana state financial advisor license expired, and all three of his companies were searched under a warrant related to ongoing investigations.

At the beginning of January, the Indiana Department of Insurance filed a motion to revoke the license of Schrenker and Heritage and fine them, "citing a string of complaints from clients, some charging that he forged signatures and withdrew investment money causing large surrender penalties". On January 9, Schrenker was ordered by a Maryland court to pay a Maryland insurance company $533,564 for issues also related to commissions. Schrenker was also being investigated by the Coast Guard Investigative Service at the time the events occurred.

At least eight lawsuits had been filed against Schrenker in the ten years leading up to the events of January 2009, including slander, interfering with a business relationship, and failing to pay a contractor who worked on one of his homes.

== Plane crash and manhunt ==
On January 10, 2009, Schrenker traveled to Harpersville, Alabama, in a pickup truck carrying a red Yamaha motorcycle with saddlebags containing money and supplies. He returned to Indiana after placing the motorcycle in a storage facility, telling the owner he would return and retrieve the motorcycle the following Monday.

Around 6:45 pm on January 11, 2009, Schrenker departed in his turboprop single-engine Piper Meridian (tail number N428DC) from an airfield in Anderson, Indiana, scheduled to fly to Destin, Florida. Near Birmingham, Alabama, he made a distress call, telling air traffic control that his windshield had imploded and he was "bleeding profusely." He then set the plane to autopilot and parachuted out. Military jets that had been dispatched to intercept Schrenker's plane discovered it in flight, with its door open and cockpit empty. They followed the plane until it crashed just north of Milton, Florida at about 9:20 pm. The plane had flown 200 miles (320 km) on autopilot and crashed 50 to 75 yards from a residential area. Upon inspecting the crash site, investigators discovered that there was no blood inside the plane and the windshield showed no sign of any problems. On board the aircraft they found a United States atlas and a national campground directory, both of which had the Florida and Alabama sections torn out.

After parachuting to the ground, Schrenker made his way to a private residence in Childersburg, Alabama, arriving around 2:30am on January 12. Appearing wet from the knees down, he told the resident he had been in a canoeing accident. He received a ride into town, where he made contact with the local police station. Not yet linking Schrenker to the crash, the police brought him to a hotel in Harpersville, where he checked in under a false name and paid for his room with cash. When police returned later that morning, he had fled on foot into nearby woods. Schrenker then traveled to the storage facility where he had earlier stored his motorcycle, and then rode the vehicle to a KOA Campground in Quincy, Florida. Without offering his name, he told the owners of the grounds that he was traveling cross country with friends, using cash to purchase a one-night tent site, firewood, and a six pack of Bud Light Lime. He was also given access to the campground's wireless internet.

On January 12, Schrenker emailed neighbor and friend Tom Britt, stating the crash was "a misunderstanding" and that he had checked into the motel because he was "embarrassed and scared" of returning home. He also said that he would likely "be gone" by the time Britt read the email. Britt turned the email over to the police. The same day, a Hamilton County Superior Court judge froze the assets of both Schrenker and his estranged wife.

== Capture ==
On January 13, officials captured Schrenker in a pup tent at the Quincy campground, having roughly located him using information from the email he had sent. Schrenker was located after he sent an email to a friend in Indiana. The friend contacted the U.S. Marshal Service, and the USMS used the IP Address to identify that Schrenker was at the campground in western Florida. The ground's owners, Troy and Caroline Hastings, grew suspicious when the man had failed to check out by 5 pm. Upon approaching Schrenker's site, Troy Hastings noticed a large red stain on the outer flap of his tent. The couple were soon contacted by the local sheriff, who asked if anything unusual had happened recently at the camp. Troy Hastings told the officer about the suspicious camper; shortly thereafter, authorities swarmed the campground.

Investigators told the press that he had slashed his left wrist, had an additional self-inflicted wound near his elbow, and was barely conscious. US Marshal Assistant Chief Deputy Frank Chiumento said that Schrenker "wasn't able to speak very clearly. A lot of the words that he was speaking were unintelligible, but he mentioned 'die' at least two times as we were providing medical treatment to him." He was in a "very incoherent state" and had lost massive amounts of blood by the time authorities first arrived, but paramedics were able to control his bleeding and he was flown to Tallahassee Memorial Hospital. Among the items found at the campground with him were knives, a laptop computer, toiletries, clothes and maps.

== Charges and trials ==
On January 13, 2009, Schrenker was charged in Hamilton County, Indiana with 11 counts of unlawful acts by a compensated adviser and unlawful transaction by an investment adviser, and his bail was set at $4 million.

In May 2009 an Alabama judge granted a $12 million judgment against Schrenker related to the sale of an airplane to a man from Alabama.

In June 2009 Schrenker pleaded guilty to federal charges of destroying an aircraft and causing the U.S. Coast Guard to respond when no help was needed. In August he was sentenced to four years and three months in prison and was required to pay $34,000 in restitution to the Coast Guard and $871,000 in restitution to Harley-Davidson, the plane's lien-holder.

By August 2010, his possessions had been sold off and there were civil claims against him totaling about $20 million. In August 2010 he reached a deal with Indiana prosecutors to plead guilty to five counts of securities fraud, serve 10 years in prison and pay victims of his schemes more than $630,000, and in October the judgement was entered, with the 10 years' imprisonment ordered to run consecutively with the sentence on the federal charges for the faked plane crash. A hearing on his ongoing divorce was scheduled for later that October.

Schrenker was released to a halfway house in late 2014. On 25 September 2015, he was released on parole by the Florida Department of Correction with a scheduled termination date of 16 September 2019.
