= Geist, Indianapolis =

Neighborhood in Indianapolis, Indiana, US

Coordinates: 39°55′44″N 85°58′56″W

Geist is an affluent area in northeastern Indianapolis, Indiana (in Lawrence Township) and southeastern Hamilton County in Fishers, Indiana. It is named for Geist Reservoir.

== Annexation ==
In January 2007, the town of Fishers proposed annexing Geist. The proposed annexation area included approximately 2,200 homes in an unincorporated area of Hamilton County. In 2008, Geist residents collected 1,700 signatures and filed suit to stop Fishers from annexing their homes into the Fishers tax base. The suit was turned over to Hamilton County Superior Court, and on December 31, 2008, the judge ruled that Fishers could annex 2,200 upscale homes surrounding Geist Reservoir. Despite their objections, on January 20, 2009, Geist residents announced they wouldn't appeal the judge's decision. For tax reasons, the annexation was not made official until January 2, 2010.

== Notable residents ==
The waterfront amenities offered at Geist have made it a haven for athletes, politicians, socialites, and businessmen. Past and present residents have included Reggie Miller, Paul George, George Hill and Mitch Daniels. Some of whom are more infamous than famous such as Tim Durham and Marcus Schrenker.

== See also ==
- Indianapolis Sailing Club
- List of neighborhoods in Indianapolis
