= Domicile (law) =

Legal status of being a permanent resident in a particular jurisdiction

In law and conflict of laws, domicile is relevant to an individual's "personal law", which includes the law that governs a person's status and their property. It is independent of a person's nationality. Although a domicile may change from time to time, a person has only one domicile at any point in their life, no matter what their circumstances. Domicile is distinct from habitual residence, where there is less focus on future intent.

As domicile is one of the connecting factors ordinarily used in common law legal systems, a person can never be left without a domicile and a domicile is acquired by everyone at birth. Generally domicile can be divided into domicile of origin, domicile of choice, and domicile by operation of law (also known as domicile of dependency). When determining the domicile of an individual, a court applies its own law and understanding of what domicile is.

In some common-law countries, such as Australia and New Zealand, the concept of domicile has been subject to statutory reform. Further, under Canada's Divorce Act, domicile has been replaced as the basis for which a provincial court has jurisdiction to hear and determine a divorce proceeding. Instead, "A court in a province has jurisdiction to hear and determine a divorce proceeding if either spouse has been habitually resident in the province for at least one year immediately preceding the commencement of the proceeding". Although domicile was traditionally known as the most appropriate connecting factor to establish an individual's personal law, its significance has declined over the years in common law systems.

== Description ==
In early societies, there was little mobility but, as travel from one state to another developed, problems emerged: what should happen if different forms of marriage exist, if children became adults at different ages, etc.? One answer is that people must be given a connection to a legal jurisdiction, like a passport, that they carry with them wherever they go.

Domicile is governed by lex domicilii, as opposed to lex patriae which depends upon nationality, which is the relationship between an individual and a country. Where the state and the country are co-extensive, the two may be the same. However:

- Where the country is federated into separate legal systems, citizenship and domicile will be different. For example, one might have United States citizenship and a domicile in Kentucky, Canadian citizenship and a domicile in Quebec, or Australian citizenship and a domicile in Tasmania.
- One can have dual nationality but not more than one domicile at a time. A person may have a domicile in one state while maintaining nationality in another country.
- Unlike nationality, no person can be without a domicile even if stateless. In other words, this refers to where one lives and not one's citizenship.

Domicile is distinct from habitual residence where there is much less focus on future intent. Domicile is being supplanted by habitual residence in international conventions dealing with conflict of laws and other private law matters.

=== General principles ===
==== Domicile of origin ====
Domicile of origin is established by law at birth to every individual. It refers to the domicile of the person's parent, and is hard for the person to lose. This means that it is not necessarily established based on where an individual was born or where their parents live. An example of domicile of origin was explained in Udny v Udny, where Udny's domicile of origin at birth was that of Scotland, even though he was born and lived in Tuscany and his father lived in England. The court made this determination based on the fact that Udny's father's domicile of origin was that of Scotland. This means that even if a person leaves his or her country of origin with no intention to return to it, the person will still be domiciled there until they obtain a new domicile of choice.

However, a child without parents will have a domicile of the place of which they were found. Further, a minor's domicile of origin will be based on the particular common-law country and its rules (see Domicile of Dependency (Minors) below).

==== Domicile of choice ====
When a person is legally allowed to change their domicile of origin, they can acquire a domicile of choice. However, until an individual obtains a new domicile of choice, their domicile of origin remains. Domicile of choice can be achieved by intention and residence. This means that if an individual is living in a country and leaves it with the intention to return, then they will not have a domicile in the country they went to; instead, their domicile of origin will remain. As stated in the Foote v Foote case, a domicile of choice can be lost or abandoned if certain factors are met.

==== Domicile of dependency (also known as domicile by operation of law) ====
===== Minors =====
At common law, the domicile attributed to a child at birth depends on the domicile of the relevant parent. In Canada, the domicile of children generally depends and changes with the domicile of the parent(s) with whom the child habitually resides. There are certain Acts within Canadian provinces for example to help determine what the domicile of a minor is, for example, section 67 of the Family Law Act of Ontario.

"Domicile of Minor

67 The domicile of a person who is a minor is,

(a) if the minor habitually resides with both parents and the parents have a common domicile, that domicile;

(b) if the minor habitually resides with one parent only, that parent's domicile;

(c) if the minor resides with another person who has lawful custody of him or her, that person's domicile; or

(d) if the minor's domicile cannot be determined under clause (a), (b) or (c), the jurisdiction with which the minor has the closest connection."

However, depending on the country, the common-law approach might remain in place. For example, in England, the domicile of origin of a child is determined at birth by the domicile of the father if the child is legitimate or by the domicile of the mother if the child is illegitimate.

===== Married women =====
At common law, a married woman suffered a legal incapacity to acquire her own domicile and thus retained the domicile of her husband. In Canada, some provinces, such as Ontario, Manitoba, and Prince Edward Island, British Columbia, domicile of dependency has been abolished.

An example of Prince Edward Island's Family Law Act is reproduced below:

"59(1) For all purposes of the law of Prince Edward Island, a married person has a legal personality that is independent, separate and distinct from that of his or her spouse"

Even in the absence of statute, it is unlikely that Canadian courts would now refuse to recognize the capacity of married women to establish their own domicile. In other common-law countries, such as Ireland, the Supreme Court has held that this concept is inconsistent with the country's Constitution. Further, the United Kingdom, New Zealand, and Australia have abolished this concept.

===== Mentally incapable =====
It is generally accepted that a person who becomes mentally incapacitated in adult life is no longer capable of forming the intent to acquire a domicile of choice and retains whichever domicile they held prior to becoming incapable. If an individual is born mentally incapable at birth or becomes so before reaching the age of majority, their domicile of dependency may continue to depend on the change with their parents, even after they reach the age of majority. There is also a "recommendation of the English and Scottish Law Commissions under which an adult who lacks mental capacity to acquire a domicile would be considered domiciled in the country with which he or she is for the time being most closely connected."

=== Application ===
A person's domicile can have important personal consequences:

- A marriage is valid only where properly performed under the law of the jurisdiction in which it takes place, as well as under the law applicable to each of the participants in effect in their respective domiciles. (Note: meaning than a person who is domiciled in a jurisdiction that only allows monogamous marriage (such as England) is unable to enter into a polygamous marriage in Saudi Arabia)
- If someone is an infant and therefore has reduced contractual capacity, that reduced capacity will tend to apply wherever they go.
- When a person dies, it is the law of their domicile that determines how their will is interpreted, or if the person has no valid will, how their property will pass by intestate succession.
- Historically, divorce could only take place in the domicile of the parties concerned.

There is tension between "domicile of origin" and "domicile of choice" which arises out of the fact that the latter can only be acquired through fulfilling both:

- the ability to settle permanently in another place, and
- the intention to remain there permanently.

The ability to settle permanently has been held to arise only when one can become a permanent resident of the jurisdiction for immigration purposes. For example, suppose that A came from England to Canada on a visa to work for an employer in Ontario. While there, their son B is born. A likes Canada enough to have their status changed to that of landed immigrant. When B comes of age, they decide to leave Ontario for good, but dies before settling permanently elsewhere. B's domicile of origin is England, because of A's initial inability to settle permanently in Ontario. When A obtains permission to land, Ontario becomes their domicile of choice, and B (provided they are still a minor) automatically acquires it as a domicile of dependency. When B attains the age of majority, Ontario becomes their domicile of choice until they decide to leave for good, at which time it reverts to the domicile of origin. Their new domicile of choice would only occur once they had been able to settle permanently in a new jurisdiction.

However, it is more difficult to abandon a domicile of choice than to acquire it. In the case of abandonment, both the above conditions must be fulfilled simultaneously as they are interrelated, whereas they are discrete in the latter case of acquisition.

The lack of intention to remain permanently can lead to unexpected results:

A, whose domicile of origin was England, went to India where he had a legitimate son B. B, while resident in India, had a legitimate son C who also, while resident in India, had a legitimate son D. A, B and C intended to return to England when they retired at sixty years of age, but they all died in India before reaching that age. D's domicile of origin remains England, even though he has never lived there.

=== In extraterritorial jurisdiction ===
Certain anomalous jurisprudence occurred where persons lived abroad in cases relating to extraterritorial jurisdiction. The East India Company was declared to be equivalent to a foreign government, and persons engaged in service to it for an indefinite period were deemed to have acquired Anglo-Indian domicile. Persons in the service of the Crown, as well as independent traders, could not acquire this status. As a consequence of the Indian Mutiny, the Company ceased to function as a government upon the passage of the Government of India Act 1858, and such domicile was not capable of being acquired thereafter.

Unsuccessful attempts were made to adapt that case law to other circumstances. In 1844, Stephen Lushington of the Consistory Court observed in dicta that, in the case of the Ottoman Empire, "every presumption is against the intention of British Christian subjects voluntarily becoming domiciled in the dominions of the Porte." Similar statements were expressed by the Court of Chancery in 1883 in rejecting the concept of an Anglo-Chinese domicile, where Chitty J of the Court of Chancery stated that "There is no authority that I am aware of in English law that an individual can become domiciled as a member of a community which is not the community possessing the supreme or sovereign territorial power." This was later endorsed by Judicial Committee of the Privy Council in 1888, in holding that "residence in a foreign country, without subjection to its municipal laws and customs, is therefore ineffectual to create a new domicile."

The reasoning behind such decisions was never satisfactorily explained, and the House of Lords later held in 1918 that these rulings built on dicta were wrongly decided and were thus swept aside. In holding that domicile in a foreign State could be properly acquired in such circumstances, Lord Finlay LC declared:

Before special provision was made in the case of foreigners resident in such countries for application to their property of their own law of succession, for their trial on criminal charges by Courts which will command their confidence, and for the settlement of disputes between them and others of the same nationality by such Courts, the presumption against the acquisition of a domicile in such a country might be regarded as overwhelming, unless under very special circumstances. But since special provision for the protection of foreigners in such countries has been made, the strength of the presumption against the acquisition of a domicile there is very much diminished.

=== Commercial domicile and prize law ===
The rules governing civil domicile have on occasion been confused with those governing commercial domicile that appear in public international law which come into play in time of war, with emphasis on the area of prize law, where a merchant's status as an enemy or neutral come to be determined in the courts of a belligerent state. The two sets of rules are fundamentally different. The basic principles that apply are:

- Commercial domicile is acquired whenever a person resides and carries on business in a country in time of war without any intention of bringing their business to an immediate end.
- It is possible to have more than one commercial domicile at the same time and be engaged in business in each of them, but enemy or neutral character is characterized only in the transactions that originate in the belligerent or neutral country concerned.
- Commercial domicile is acquired when a person acts as a merchant, even when they also act as a consular representative of a state.
- In acting as a merchant, the activity must be extensive enough that the country is said to derive an advantage from the trade they carry on there.
- Commercial domicile is lost at the moment a person puts himself in motion to quit the country of domicile with no intention of returning.
- Any person is an enemy with respect to a ship or cargo who resides and carries on a trade in an enemy territory, and has not divested himself of this hostile character by bona fide putting himself in motion to quit the enemy territory.
- If a person carries on business in both enemy and British territory, any property belonging to him as a merchant of the belligerent state is liable to be captured at sea. Neutral ships may be captured if they break, or attempt to break, a blockade.

== The law in specific jurisdictions ==
The rules determining domicile in common law jurisdictions are based on case law. Most jurisdictions have altered some aspects of the common-law rules by statute, the details of which vary from one jurisdiction to another. The general framework of the common-law rules has however survived in most jurisdictions and is in outline as follows:

=== Canada ===
Canada is a bijural country, but the common-law provinces follow the rules of domicile unless there is statutory authority to state otherwise. This means that within Canada a person has a domicile of origin which can be displaced by a domicile of choice. To obtain a domicile of choice two factors have to be met, "the acquisition of residence in fact in a new place and the intention of permanently settling there ... in the sense of making that place [one's] principal residence indefinitely".

An individual who successfully obtains a domicile of choice can still abandon it. A person abandons a domicile of choice in a country, "by ceasing to intend to reside there permanently or indefinitely, and not otherwise." Loss of domicile "requires an intention to cease to reside in a place coupled with acts that end one's residence".

Overall, the concept of domicile and its importance has declined over the years, in relation to a connecting factor for choice of law, as a basis of jurisdiction, and as a basis for recognizing foreign divorces. However, this concept and the tests explained were discussed in an Alberta case, Foote v Foote Estate, below.

==== Alberta ====
An Alberta case, Foote v Foote Estate, provides a comprehensive overview of the law of domicile.

The late Eldon Douglas Foote lived in Alberta for the first 43 years of his life and in 1970 he purchased property in Norfolk Island, and built a residence. He and his second wife acquired permanent residence status in Norfolk Island in 1977. In 1981 they divorced, and he then married Anne, an Australian citizen, in 1984, who was granted permanent resident status in Norfolk Island in 1966. In 1999, the Footes purchased an unfinished condominium property in Victoria, British Columbia, and construction was complete in 2001. They then spent three summers there. Around the same time, they made plans to sell their residence on Norfolk Island, but it was not advertised for sale. In 2004 Mr. Foote died.

The issue in this case was, what was the domicile of the late Mr. Foote when he died?

The Alberta Court of Appeal agreed with the trial judge that any plans for Mr. Foote to leave Norfolk Island to take up residence in Victoria and live there indefinitely were undeveloped and the intention was ambiguous. Thus, the court upheld the decision and stated that evidence supported that Mr. Foote's domicile changed from Alberta to Norfolk Island in 1972 and that he had not acquired a new domicile of choice in British Columbia or Alberta. Nor did he abandon Norfolk and not adopt a new domicile, which would revert his domicile to Alberta. His domicile at his death was in Norfolk Island.

==== Manitoba ====
At common law, if a domicile of choice is abandoned by an individual and they do not acquire a new domicile of choice, their domicile of origin revives, so that they are never left without a domicile. However, this means that a person can be linked to the laws of a particular country even if they have terminated their connection with it a long time ago.

Manitoba's The Domicile and Habitual Residence Act (Act) has repealed the common law concept of domicile. An important aspect of the repeal includes abolishing the doctrine of revival and the rule where a woman's domicile was that of her husband, which can be found under section 3 of the Act.

As noted above, instead of following this doctrine, s 3 of The Domicile and Habitual Residence Act (which is produced below) states that this doctrine is no longer law in the province of Manitoba.

Common law of domicile abolished

"3 The common law rules respecting domicile, including, without limiting the generality of the foregoing,

(a) the rule known as the revival of domicile of origin whereby the domicile of origin of a person revives upon the abandonment of a domicile of choice; and

(b) the rule of law whereby a married woman has the domicile of her husband;

are no longer law in Manitoba."

The Act has other important provisions to aid in determining one's domicile too, for example section 10.

==== Divorce and other provinces ====
Until the passage of the Divorce Act in 1968, divorce could only be obtained in the province of domicile, which effectively required those domiciled in Quebec and Newfoundland to obtain divorce only through an Act of the Parliament of Canada. The 1968 Act required that "the domicile of a married woman shall be determined as if she were unmarried, and, if she is a minor, as if she had attained her majority", with one year's residence in the province where the divorce order was sought. The later 1986 Act removed the domicile requirement completely. As of March 2021, "A court in a province has jurisdiction to hear and determine a divorce proceeding if either spouse has been habitually resident in the province for at least one year immediately preceding the commencement of the proceeding".

When later court proceedings revealed complications arising from the impact of domicile on the validity of same-sex marriages solemnized in Canada, the Civil Marriage Act was amended in 2013 to provide for divorce to be available to nonresident spouses in the province where the marriage took place.

Outside of marriage and divorce, rules relating to domicile generally fall under provincial jurisdiction. The Civil Code of Quebec standardizes rules for that province, while Manitoba is the only common-law province to attempt to completely revise and simplify the rules within its scope. Other provinces have modified their rules as the need arose.

Ontario has modified the following rules relating to domicile:

- Effective 1 January 1959, the domicile of origin for an adopted child was declared to be that of its adoptive parents, "as if the adopted child had been born in lawful wedlock to the adopting parent."
- On 31 March 1978, the doctrine of illegitimacy was abolished, as well as the rule deeming a married woman's domicile to be that of her husband's, and the rules governing the domicile of minors were simplified.
- Effective 1 March 1986, the rules governing the domicile of minors were simplified further.

=== China ===
A domiciled individual is defined as one who, by reason of the individual's permanent registered address, family, and/or economic interests, habitually resides in China. A PRC national with a Chinese passport or a domicile registration is likely to be deemed as domiciled in China–whether resident in China or not–and therefore attract liability for individual income tax on worldwide income.

=== India ===
A domicile of origin is the one with which a person is born. It can be changed as a result of adoption and marriage.

Under the common law, a married woman was deemed to have the same domicile as her husband, so the domicile of origin of the children of the marriage was the same as that of their father and the time of birth. Children gained their mother's domicile if their father was predeceased or they were born outside marriage. An orphan has the jurisdiction over the original domicile where they were found.

Every adult (other than married women) can change their domicile by leaving the jurisdiction of the prior domicile with an intention of permanently residing somewhere else. This is referred to as a domicile of choice. A domicile of choice can be abandoned if a new domicile of choice is acquired or if the domicile of origin revives.

A married woman can only get domicile and other caste certificates from her husband's jurisdiction.

A child's domicile is dependent and, therefore the same, as the adult on whom he or she is dependent.

=== United Kingdom ===
The United Kingdom contains three jurisdictions: England and Wales; Scotland; and Northern Ireland. The law in Scotland is similar to England and Wales, but not identical. All UK jurisdictions distinguish between domicile of origin (decided by the domicile of their father, or if parents unmarried their mother), domicile of choice (when a person has exercised a legal option to change their domicile as can be done when attaining majority) and domicile of dependence (applicable to those legally dependent on another such as some incapable persons, children, or women married before 1974). Only one place can be a person's domicile at any one time thus preventing the creation of differing simultaneous domiciles for different purposes; the three types of domicile can enable a voluntary change when a person reaches a relevant age. If a domicile of choice lapses and is not replaced the domicile of origin reasserts itself. The concept of domicile is rooted in case law, though amended on some points by statutes.

==== England and Wales ====
Domicile and Matrimonial Proceedings Act 1973 (Note: Section 17(1).)
- Act of Parliament
- Parliament of the United Kingdom
- Long title: An Act to amend the law relating to the domicile of married women and persons not of full age, to matters connected with domicile and to jurisdiction in matrimonial proceedings including actions for reduction of consistorial decrees; to make further provision about the recognition of divorces and legal separations; and for purposes connected therewith.
- Citation: 1973 c. 45
- Territorial extent: United Kingdom (Note: Section 17(4).)

Dates
- Royal assent: 25 July 1973
- Commencement: 1 January 1974 (Note: Section 17(5).)

Other legislation
- Amends: Sheriff Courts (Scotland) Act 1907; Divorce (Scotland) Act 1938; Matrimonial Causes Act (Northern Ireland) 1939; Matrimonial Causes (War Marriages) Act 1944; Marriage and Matrimonial Causes Act (Northern Ireland) 1946; Law Reform (Miscellaneous Provisions) Act 1949; Maintenance Orders Act 1950; Law Reform (Miscellaneous Provisions) Act (Northern Ireland) 1951; Commonwealth Immigrants Act 1962; Recognition of Divorces and Legal Separations Act 1971; Matrimonial Causes Act 1973
- Amended by: Statute Law (Repeals) Act 1977; Presumption of Death (Scotland) Act 1977; Matrimonial Causes (Northern Ireland) Order 1978; Zimbabwe Act 1979; Law Reform (Miscellaneous Provisions) (Scotland) Act 1980; Law Reform (Parent and Child) (Scotland) Act 1986; Presumption of Death Act 2013; Marriage (Same Sex Couples) Act 2013; Marriage and Civil Partnership (Scotland) Act 2014
- Relates to: Southern Rhodesia Act 1965

Status: Amended

Text of statute as originally enacted

Revised text of statute as amended

Text of the Domicile and Matrimonial Proceedings Act 1973 as in force today (including any amendments) within the United Kingdom, from legislation.gov.uk.

The Domicile and Matrimonial Proceedings Act 1973 abolished the rule that a married woman had the domicile of her husband (with transitional rules for those married before 1 January 1974), as well as reforming the rules dealing with the domicile of minors.

==== Scotland ====
The rules for domicile of persons under 16 for the particular purposes of some Scottish family law are dealt with in the Family Law (Scotland) Act 2006.

==== Northern Ireland ====
The law in Northern Ireland is the same as England and Wales.

==== Domicile for UK taxation purposes ====
A person who is no longer domiciled in the UK is nevertheless still deemed to be domiciled in the UK for tax purposes if they meet one of the following rules:

- 15-year rule
- Formerly domiciled resident
- 3-year rule

The discussion below is just an outline of these three rules.

===== 15-year rule =====
Section 267(1)(b) of the Inheritance Tax Act 1984 provides:

A person not domiciled in the UK at any time (in this section referred to as "the relevant time") shall be treated for the purposes of this Act as domiciled in the UK (and not elsewhere) at the relevant time if...

(b) he was resident in the UK—

(i) for at least fifteen of the twenty tax years immediately preceding the relevant tax year, and

(ii) for at least one of the four tax years ending with the relevant tax year.

The start date for acquisition of 15-year deemed domicile is 6 April in the tax year after the 15/20 year test is satisfied. It does not matter whether a person is resident in that tax year. The deemed domicile under this rule ends when either of the two conditions under s.267(1)(b) set out above are not met.

===== Formerly domiciled resident rule =====
Section 267(1)(aa) of the Inheritance Tax Act 1984 provides:

A person not domiciled in the UK at any time (in this section referred to as "the relevant time") shall be treated for the purposes of this Act as domiciled in the UK (and not elsewhere) at the relevant time if...

(aa) he is a formerly domiciled resident for the tax year in which the relevant time falls ("the relevant tax year")

"Formerly-domiciled resident" is a label for a set of four rules. Section 272 provides:

"formerly domiciled resident", in relation to a tax year, means a person—

(a) who was born in the UK,

(b) whose domicile of origin was in the UK,

(c) who was resident in the UK for that tax year, and

(d) who was resident in the UK for at least one of the two tax years immediately preceding that tax year.

The domicile start date for formerly-domiciled residents under the IHT deemed domicile rule is 6 April in the 2nd year of residence. The domicile end date for formerly-domiciled residents is 6 April in the first year of non-residence. The same rule applies for income tax and capital gains tax but without the one-year grace period in condition (d).

===== 3-year rule =====
The 3-year rule concerns the person who is actually UK domiciled and who loses their UK domicile. The domicile start date for this rule is the date of change of domicile, and the domicile end date is 3 years after that date.

Section 267(1)(a) of the Inheritance Tax Act 1984 provides:

A person not domiciled in the UK at any time (in this section referred to as "the relevant time") shall be treated for the purposes of this Act as domiciled in the UK (and not elsewhere) at the relevant time if—

(a) he was domiciled in the UK within the three years immediately preceding the relevant time.

=== United States ===
==== State income tax domicile planning ====
In the United States, domicile carries significant tax implications distinct from federal taxation. Each state may impose state income tax on the worldwide income of residents domiciled within that state, regardless of where income is earned or where the individual resides during the tax year. Establishing domicile in one of the nine states with no state income tax—Alaska, Florida, Nevada, South Dakota, Tennessee, Texas, Washington, Wyoming, and New Hampshire—provides substantial tax advantages for high-income individuals, particularly those relocating from high-tax states like New York and California.

A taxpayer's state domicile determines tax liability independent of residency; an individual can be a resident of a state (through physical presence or maintaining a dwelling) without being domiciled there, and conversely can be domiciled in a no-income-tax state while residing elsewhere. Establishing domicile in a chosen state requires documented intent and action, including obtaining a state driver's license, registering to vote, maintaining a residential address, and demonstrating other factors indicating permanent home intent. Additionally, many zero-income-tax states provide supplementary benefits: Florida offers unlimited homestead protection against creditors for a domiciliary's primary residence, and several states (Florida, Texas, South Dakota) impose no estate tax, creating combined income and wealth protection benefits unavailable in other jurisdictions. However, establishing domicile claims requires careful compliance, as high-income-tax states conduct aggressive audits of former residents; over 50% of contested domicile claims result in adverse determinations for the taxpayer, leading to back taxes and penalties if documentation is insufficient to prove genuine domicile intent.

==== Jurisdictional matters ====
Each state of the United States is considered a separate sovereign within the U.S. federal system, and each therefore has its own laws on questions of marriage, inheritance, and liability for tort and contract actions.

Persons who reside in the U.S. must have a state domicile for various purposes. For example, a person can always be sued in their state of domicile. Furthermore, in order for individual parties (that is, natural persons) to invoke the diversity jurisdiction of a United States district court (a federal trial court), all the plaintiffs must have a different state of domicile from all the defendants (so-called "complete diversity").

In 2010, the United States Supreme Court case of Hertz Corp. v. Friend concluded that the "principal place of business refers to the place where corporations' high level officers direct, control and coordinate the corporations' activities." A corporation's state of incorporation and principal place of business each count for (or against) diversity jurisdiction.

== Political office ==
It is important in terms of politics, as in many jurisdictions candidates must maintain residency within the district in which they intend to run. Requirements vary by jurisdiction, and sometimes by the political office for which a person runs. The cutoff may be as little as a month or as much as several years. Once elected, the office-holder must remain resident in the appropriate district, or may usually be forced to resign.

=== United States ===
As a general principle, in the United States residency for federal politicians is defined as the intent to return to the particular district or state they represent following their term in office. For example, the purchase or occupancy of a home in the DC metro area, for proximity to the Capitol and the Congressional offices, does not change an Iowa congressman's or congresswoman's legal residency in his or her state.

Conversely, to be eligible for election to a state-level office, such as a state assembly or a governorship, a person must be resident within the state where they are running for office; however, states vary in whether or not an assembly candidate is required to reside in the specific district where they are running. In one noted recent case, Nevada Assembly candidate Andrew Martin's eligibility for office was called into question due to ambiguity regarding his residency status. Martin owned two properties, a condominium in the district where he was running for office and a house in a neighboring district, and his campaign was affected by conflicting claims about which property should be regarded as his primary residence. A judge ruled Martin ineligible to run on November 5, 2012, just one day before the election — but as the decision came too late for Clark County officials to reprint the ballots, Martin's name remained on the ballot and he won the election. Martin was allowed to take his seat in the legislature without a formal challenge being filed against him.

== Rights of citizenship ==
=== Latvia ===
Permanent residents of Latvia, a participant of the Schengen Agreement and like all countries within the Schengen zone, are able to visit any other country within the zone for up to 90 days a year, without any kind of administrative or legal procedures.

However, there is a difference between a citizen and a holder of a residence permit in Latvia:

- A residence permit holder is not entitled to hold governmental office or to vote in any elections.
- The person cannot join the army or a police force.

=== Malaysia ===
The Malaysia My Second Home program (commonly abbreviated "MM2H") is an international residency scheme enacted by the Government of Malaysia to allow foreigners to live in the country on a long-stay travel visa of up to 10 years. To qualify for the program, applicants must meet certain financial and medical criteria. Successful applicants are then entitled to enter and leave the country on a largely unrestricted basis, and also benefit from other incentives aimed at making their stay in Malaysia more convenient. Certain restrictions may apply.

=== Malta ===
In Malta, residency has been interpreted to include not only the physical presence in the country, but includes and allows periodic absence from the country. A person who is temporarily absent from Malta because of work, study, illness or mission, must not and cannot be considered as not resident in Malta. A person who goes abroad to study or for work purposes is still 'directly and continuously concerned' with the political activity of the country of residence and therefore has the right to vote.

=== United States ===
Voting by the general public (the electorate) is also defined by residency, with most people being prohibited from doing so except at the precinct for their primary residence. There are exceptions for this such that expatriates can vote in the country where they maintain their original citizenship.

The Servicemembers Civil Relief Act (SCRA) provides specific protections to military service members who are domiciled outside their home states.

It is also important in terms of other law, such as requirements that vehicles and other things which must be licensed in the place which the owner resides. There is a grace period normally around 30 days for persons moving into the area.

In addition to such responsibilities, certain benefits also come from residency. Discounts on tuition usually are allowed for students who are resident within the state or province (or country) for a year or more, if it is a public university or the like. Other forms of public assistance such as welfare may also have a waiting period, to prevent abuse.

Residency in any given U.S. state is recognized by the United States Constitution as "citizenship" of that state, a somewhat unusual arrangement known as "dual citizenship" (though not in the original multi-national context).

== See also ==
- Permanent residency
- Resident registration
- Tax residence
- Abode
