= Presumption of Death (Scotland) Act 1977 =

Act of the Parliament of the United Kingdom

Presumption of Death (Scotland) Act 1977 (Note: Section 20(1).)
- Act of Parliament
- Parliament of the United Kingdom
- Long title: An Act to make fresh provision in the law of Scotland in relation to the presumed death of missing persons; and for connected purposes.
- Citation: 1977 c. 27
- Territorial extent: Scotland (Note: Section 20(3).)

Dates
- Royal assent: 22 July 1977
- Commencement: 1 March 1978 (Note: Section 20(2). The Presumption of Death (Scotland) Act 1977 (Commencement) Order 1978 (SI 1978/159).)

Other legislation
- Amends: See § Repealed enactments
- Repeals/revokes: See § Repealed enactments
- Amended by: Act of Sederunt (Rules of the Court of Session 1994) 1994; Civil Partnership Act 2004; Marriage and Civil Partnership (Scotland) Act 2014

Status: Amended

Text of statute as originally enacted

Revised text of statute as amended

Text of the Presumption of Death (Scotland) Act 1977 as in force today (including any amendments) within the United Kingdom, from legislation.gov.uk.

The Presumption of Death (Scotland) Act 1977 (c. 27) is an act of the Parliament of the United Kingdom that made fresh provision in the law of Scotland in relation to the presumed death of missing persons.

== Provisions ==
=== Repealed enactments ===
Section 19 of the act repealed 4 enactments, listed in the second schedule to the act.

Citation	Short title	Extent of repeal
45 & 46 Vict. c. 53	Entail (Scotland) Act 1882	In section 14, the words "for a period of seven years", "and that there is no evidence that such heir in possession has been in life during the preceding seven years", "subject to the provisions of the Presumption of Life Limitation (Scotland) Act 1891", "for any shorter period than seven years" and "under the provisions of the Presumption of Life Limitation (Scotland) Act 1891, or otherwise".
54 & 55 Vict. c. 29	Presumption of Life Limitation (Scotland) Act 1891	The whole act.
1 & 2 Geo. 6. c. 50	Divorce (Scotland) Act 1938	Section 5.
1973 c. 45	Domicile and Matrimonial Proceedings Act 1973	Section 7(1)(b) and (4). In Schedule 4, paragraph 2.

== Subsequent developments ==
The act has been amended on several occasions. The Act of Sederunt (Rules of the Court of Session 1994) 1994 (SI 1994/1443) substituted words in section 4(3), in force from 5 September 1994. The Civil Partnership Act 2004 amended sections 1(3)(b)(i), 3(1), and 3(3) to extend the act's provisions to civil partners, in force from 5 December 2005. The Marriage and Civil Partnership (Scotland) Act 2014 made further amendments, including inserting section 1(4A) and amending section 13, in force from 1 September 2014 and 16 December 2014 respectively.
