= Lawrence Joseph Bader =

American salesman and host (1926–1966)

- In 1963, as TV announcer "Fritz" Johnson
- Born: December 2, 1926; Akron, Ohio, U.S.
- Disappeared: March 15, 1957 (aged 30); Lake Erie
- Died: September 16, 1966 (aged 39); Omaha, Nebraska, U.S.
- Other names: John Francis "Fritz" Johnson
- Known for: Disappearing on fishing trip, being discovered living under new identity; probable amnesiac.
- Spouses: Mary Lou Knapp; Nancy Zimmer (m. 1961; ann. 1965)
- Children: 5 his own, 1 adopted

Lawrence Joseph Bader (December 2, 1926 – September 16, 1966), also known as John Francis "Fritz" Johnson, was an American cookware salesman from Akron, Ohio, who disappeared while on a fishing trip on Lake Erie on May 15, 1957. Declared dead in 1960, Bader was found alive five years later as John Francis "Fritz" Johnson, a local television personality living in Omaha, Nebraska. The incident is described by author Jay Robert Nash as "one of the most baffling amnesia disappearances on record, a weird story forever unanswered."

== Disappearance ==
On May 15, 1957, Bader, a cookware salesman for the Reynolds Metals Corporation from Akron, Ohio, rented a 14-foot (4.3 m) boat, kissed his wife Mary Lou goodbye, and went to Lake Erie to go fishing. His boat was found the next day after a storm. The boat had minor damage and a missing oar. Bader, who was $20,000 in debt (equivalent to $229,265 in 2025) and in trouble with the IRS, was missing. The couple had three children, with another on the way.

== "Fritz" Johnson ==
Four days later, John "Fritz" Johnson made his first known appearance at Roundtable Bar in Omaha, Nebraska. Johnson immediately attracted attention by sitting on a flagpole for thirty days to raise money for polio. Johnson's popularity led to his becoming a bartender, radio announcer, and TV sports director at KETV-7. With his flamboyant personality, he became a minor celebrity in the Omaha area.

Johnson lived an equally colorful bachelor lifestyle, driving a hearse equipped with pillows, a bar, and an incense burner, aptly naming it his "hunting vehicle". In 1961, Johnson married Nancy Zimmer, a 20-year-old divorcee, and adopted her daughter. Later, they had a son together.

In 1964, it was discovered that Johnson had a cancerous tumor behind his left eye. He lost the eye and wore an eyepatch, adding to his flamboyance.

== Reappearance ==
On February 2, 1965, Johnson, who, like Bader, was an archery enthusiast, was demonstrating archery equipment at a sporting goods show in Chicago. An acquaintance from Akron saw Johnson and, despite the eyepatch and mustache, recognized Bader. He then brought Bader's 21-year-old niece, Suzanne Peika, to have a look. Convinced, she asked him, "Pardon me, but aren't you my uncle Larry Bader, who disappeared seven years ago?" Although Johnson laughed it off, Peika called in her two brothers from Akron, who had his fingerprints compared with Bader's military records, and they were a match. Johnson was now faced with the fact that all his memories were false and that he had two wives.

It was like a physical shock. Up until that moment, I had no doubt that I was not Larry Bader. But when I heard that, it was like a door had been slammed and somebody had hit me right in the face.

— "Fritz" Johnson

== Two wives ==
Bader's reappearance caused many problems for Mary Lou, his first wife. She had been receiving monthly Social Security payments of $254, and had received $39,500 from Bader's life insurance that would have to be paid back. Also, Mary Lou had been dating since her husband's "death", and had recently accepted a marriage proposal. With the marriage reinstated, her new marriage was impossible, since she was Catholic. Since Bader's reappearance, his marriage to Nancy was regarded as legally null and void. However, she claimed she would stick by him.

== Analysis ==
A team of psychiatrists examined Bader for ten days. Their conclusion was that Johnson had no recollection of his former life. There was evidence in Johnson's past that he might have wanted to "start again", having tried various unsuccessful get-rich-quick schemes and getting into trouble with the IRS for tax evasion. According to psychologists, cases of amnesia lasting several years, in which the person filled the missing time with false memories, are rare but not unheard of. Another theory was that the tumor may have been responsible for Bader's apparent memory loss. This was never determined.

== Death ==
The malignant tumor that cost Bader his eye eventually resurfaced. Bader/Johnson died on September 16, 1966, at St. Joseph's Medical Hospital in Omaha. His death meant that the question of whether he was an amnesiac or a hoaxer was never resolved.

== See also ==
- List of solved missing person cases
