= Jerry Balisok =

American professional wrestler

- Born: Jerry Bibb Balisok; September 8, 1955; Biloxi, Mississippi, US
- Died: April 18, 2013 (aged 57); Granada, Nicaragua
- Cause of death: Heart attack caused by heat stroke
- Burial place: Rivas, Nicaragua
- Other names: Ricky Allen Wetta; Harrison Rains Hanover
- Education: Walla Walla Community College
- Occupations: Pro Wrestler; Fugitive, Prisoner; Winning legal advocate before the US Supreme Court
- Years active: Pro wrestler (1974–1977); Fugitive (1977–1989); Legal advocate (1993–2013)
- Spouses: Deborah Taylor (m. 1977; div. 2000) Scarleth Hanover (m. 2012)

Harrison Rains Hanover (born Jerry Bibb Balisok, September 8, 1955 – April 18, 2013) was an American professional wrestler known as Mr. X, and an FBI fugitive. He is best known for skipping bail, faking his own death, and convincing law enforcement officials he died in the 1978 Jonestown Massacre. Living under the fake identity Ricky Allen Wetta, Balisok was arrested in 1989 for attempted murder in King County, Washington. Once the fingerprinting process was complete, law enforcement officials learned Ricky Allen Wetta was indeed Jerry Balisok. His capture made national headlines across the United States, and drew national criticism towards the FBI investigators for not properly identifying the remains believed to be Balisok's.

Balisok's crimes, his life as a fugitive, and later apprehension were featured in the book, Wicked North Alabama, by Jacquelyn Procter Reeves.

== Early life ==
Balisok was born in Biloxi, Mississippi to Coleman Balisok, a school teacher, and Marjorie Balisok, a hospital nurse. As a toddler, the Balisok family moved to Huntsville, Alabama, and Jerry graduated from Huntsville High School in 1973. Coleman died from a heart attack when Jerry was 13, leaving Marjorie to raise him as a single, working mother. As a standout high school wrestler, Balisok caught the attention of Buddy Fuller, promoter of Southeastern Championship Wrestling which ran events in the Huntsville area.

== Professional wrestling career ==
After training in Florida, Balisok returned to Huntsville to begin his professional wrestling career in 1974. Before his first match, Balisok was informed that being paid as a pro wrestler might affect his amateur status. After watching a training session, Balisok drew interest from University of Tampa wrestling coaches, but was informed he would be ineligible for NCAA competition if he pursued a pro career. At the time, wrestling promoters advertised pro wrestling events as competition and not entertainment. It wasn't until 1989 when Vince McMahon announced outcomes were predetermined, and pro wrestling shouldn't be held to the same standards by state governments as other sports leagues. Fuller convinced Balisok to use the Mr. X gimmick, a character that had been utilized by numerous pro wrestling territories for decades. All wrestlers who had utilized the Mr. X character wore a red or white mask, and Fuller believed if Balisok hid his face, he couldn't be identified and would maintain his college eligibility.

After performing as Mr. X for a year, Balisok saved up enough money to attend the University of Tampa and join the wrestling team as a walk-on in hopes of earning a scholarship. However, Balisok was informed by the coaching staff they learned of his pro wrestling career and he was not eligible to join the team. Balisok was never told how the coaching staff found out, but he believed Buddy Fuller tipped them off so he could continue his pro wrestling career. Balisok left the Southeastern Championship Wrestling promotion soon after.

From 1975 to 1977, Balisok continued performing as Mr. X for Georgia Championship Wrestling (GCW) and Championship Wrestling from Florida. He had notable feuds with Dusty Rhodes, Mr. Wrestling II, and The Masked Superstar. Despite his 6'1", 300 lb. frame, Balisok was usually on the losing end of these feuds, because the Mr. X character had traditionally been used as jobber to other wrestlers. Despite his desire to change gimmicks, promoters were eager to keep Balisok in the Mr. X role to raise the profile of other performers on the roster by defeating a wrestler of Balisok's size.

In January 1977, Balisok was involved in a motorcycle accident. He had numerous injuries, including a fractured hip. Doctors had to place a pin into Balisok's hip, putting his professional wrestling career in jeopardy.

== Check forgery and fugitive life ==
Instead of using his money to attend the University of Tampa, Balisok bought a motorcycle store in Huntsville, Alabama in 1974. While recovering from his motorcycle accident, Balisok began focusing more on his business. However, the FBI soon began investigating Balisok for check forgery. In 1977, Balisok was indicted on 13 counts of check forgery for writing bad checks over international lines. The prosecution accused Balisok of paying for motorcycle parts in Caribbean countries with fraudulent checks, written while he was performing on overseas wrestling tours. Under federal law, Balisok faced 10 years in prison for each count due to the dollar amount each check was written for.

Prior to his indictment, Balisok was dating Deborah Kindred, a Huntsville native who had recently separated from her husband. Fearing a conviction and long prison sentence, Balisok informed Kindred he intended to skip bail and live life as a fugitive. Kindred stated her desire to join him, and the couple fled Huntsville with Kindred's young son. Prior to leaving Huntsville, Kindred finalized her divorce from her estranged husband. Balisok and Kindred then broke into the home of Kindred's second cousin, Ricky Allen Wetta, and stole his birth certificate, driver's license, and social security card. Balisok used these pieces of identification to assume Wetta's identity, and married Kindred under the Ricky Wetta name.

Later in 1977, prior to the first day of his trial, Balisok and his new family fled to Miami, Florida before settling in Puerto Rico. Balisok was hired by King Wrestling promoter, Campeón Escalera, as a performer. Escalera was unaware that Balisok was wanted by the American FBI. Later that year, Balisok and his family relocated to The Bahamas to perform at National Wrestling Alliance events in Nassau. However, Balisok was informed by the Bahamian government his visa was expiring and would not be renewed. In late 1978, Balisok and his family relocated to Seattle, Washington after he obtained a job at Boeing by falsifying college transcripts stating he graduated from the University of Cambridge in England. During the interview process, Balisok demonstrated detailed knowledge of aerospace engineering but was fired in 1979 after company officials discovered he forged his transcripts. After settling in Seattle, Balisok and Deborah had three children. Their son John Taylor appeared on the reality television series Too Fat for 15: Fighting Back.

== FBI search ==
After Balisok did not show up to his trial in 1978, a warrant was issued for his arrest. FBI investigators tracked his whereabouts from Alabama to Florida and through the Caribbean, but agents never managed to capture him. By mid-1978, agents had no leads for Balisok's location.

In December 1978, the cover of Time Magazine showed the dead bodies of those who committed mass suicide as part of the Jonestown massacre. Balisok's mother, Marjorie, told the FBI that three of the bodies in the Time Magazine photo were Balisok, his wife Deborah, and her son. The FBI quickly dismissed Marjorie's belief, but she asked to identify the bodies once the remains were flown back to the United States from Guyana. The FBI informed her that all of the bodies in Jonestown were decomposed by the time law enforcement officials arrived, and they were all buried in Oakland, California, thus making identification of the bodies impossible. Upset at the FBI after hearing this news, Marjorie had a tombstone placed for Balisok at Maple Hill Cemetery in Huntsville, Alabama with the inscription, "Damn the state dept."

Marjorie died in May 1983, and the FBI called off the manhunt for Jerry later that year. Due to the lack of success in apprehending Balisok, the Alabama State Attorney General's office dropped the check forgery charges in 1984 because prosecutors were satisfied he was dead. With no charges against him, Balisok could have ended his life as a fugitive due to the statute of limitations expiring. However, Balisok was unaware the charges were dropped and he continued to live as Ricky Allen Wetta.

== Additional crimes and imprisonment ==
In the 1980s, Balisok earned wealth from commercial real estate development, primarily on hotels. In 1988, Balisok purchased a hotel property in Wenatchee, Washington. The property caught fire later that year, and investigators quickly ruled it an arson. Balisok was later indicted for the crime after prosecutors accused him of setting fire to the building to collect the insurance monies. For an unknown reason, when law enforcement officials fingerprinted Ricky Allen Wetta during the booking process, his real identity of Jerry Balisok did not come up in their database.

In September 1989, Balisok was arrested for the attempted murder of Emmett Thompson, Jr., a friend of Balisok's stepson. Prosecutors accused Balisok of shooting Thompson to cover up the arson crime. After being granted legal immunity, Thompson confessed to committing arson at the Wenatchee hotel after being paid by Balisok to do so, and stated Balisok tried to kill him to prevent prosecutors in the arson case from discovering how the crime was carried out. After his arrest, King County law enforcement discovered Ricky Allen Wetta was actually Jerry Bibb Balisok after being fingerprinted.

Balisok's capture made national headlines around the United States. In 1990, Balisok was found guilty of attempted murder and received a 20-year prison sentence. In 1992, Balisok was found not guilty of the arson charge in U.S. Federal Court. Balisok's attempted murder conviction was overturned in 1993 after the Washington Court of Appeals ruled the prosecution lacked evidence for a motive after Balisok was found not guilty on the arson charge, and jury misconduct took place in the original case. In 1994, Balisok's conviction was reinstated by the Washington Supreme Court.

== U.S. Supreme Court defeat ==
Balisok was released from prison in 2003 after serving 13.5 years. While incarcerated, Balisok worked as a legal advocate for himself and other inmates, specializing in appellate law. In 1997, Balisok lost a decision before the Supreme Court of the United States (Edwards v. Balisok 520 U.S. 641, 1997). Balisok was caught cheating on a test while in prison, and claimed the prison violated his due process rights when they punished him with a loss of good time (early release) credits. On appeal to the Ninth Circuit Court of Appeals, Balisok successfully argued that he should be able to bring his Due Process claim for money damages in Federal Court under the Civil Rights Act, before asking the state court to grant back those early release credits in a Habeas Corpus action. After the Ninth Circuit's ruling, Washington Assistant Attorney General Talis Abolins successfully petitioned the U.S. Supreme Court for review and, in 1997, the Supreme Court rejected Balisok's claims and clarified that prisoners who claim an unlawful loss of early release credits must first seek a return of those credits in state court before bringing a federal civil rights claim for money damages. (Gary Edwards and Tana Wood v. Jerry B. Balisok 520 U.S 641117, 1997). Balisok's civil rights claim was dismissed for failure to exhaust the state court habeas corpus remedies. This precedent helped define the jurisdictional line between claims that fall under the Civil Rights Act, and those that are subject to habeas corpus, which provides state courts with the right to first address a claim that will impact the duration of a prisoner's criminal sentence.

== Later life and death ==
Upon his release from prison, Balisok moved to Seattle, Washington. In 2006, Balisok legally changed his name to Harrison Rains Hanover. He began working as funds manager for JPierce Investments, and in 2009, he was implicated in a scheme to defraud First Security Bank of Washington, though formal charges against Hanover were never filed.

Later in 2009, Hanover moved to Nicaragua to work for the investment company The Five Day Bullet Trade Program. Hanover later married a native Nicaraguan woman named Scarleth.

In 2012, Hanover was arrested in Rivas, Nicaragua for sexual offenses. He was sentenced to 24 years in prison and ordered to serve time in the Penitentiary System of Granada. On April 18, 2013, Hanover was rushed to the hospital complaining of chest pains, and died of a heart attack brought on by the heat within the prison. Hanover's heat-related death caused a commotion among prisoners and their families, who asked for an investigation into the ill-health effects caused by extreme temperatures.
