= Chandra Mohan Sharma =

Indian social activist (born 1976)

- Born: 1976 (age 49–50)
- Occupation: RTI activist
- Known for: Campaign against land mafia
- Political party: Aam Aadmi Party (AAP)
- Criminal charge: Murder

Chandra Mohan Sharma (born 1976) is an Indian social activist who used the Right to Information (RTI) act to fight against illegal encroachments of government land. He was known for his campaign against the land mafia in NOIDA and Delhi region. In 2014, he was arrested after he killed a homeless man and faking his own death. He was one of the early members of the Anna Hazare-led 2011 anti-corruption movement, and later the Aam Aadmi Party (AAP).

== Activist career ==
Sharma was a part-time RTI activist. He worked as an employee at Honda Siel manufacturing unit at Greater Noida, in the maintenance department. He had been living in Greater Noida for over 12 years. As an activist, he filed around 300 RTI applications to expose the illegal land encroachment in the Noida-Delhi region. Sharma also filed RTI applications pertaining to other issues. For example, in 2011, he had filed an RTI application against illegal fireworks sales in Chandigarh.

== Killing and staged death ==
Sharma lived with his wife Savita and had an unhappy married life. ^{[Check Grammar]} In 2014, he decided to fake his own death so that he could start a new life with his 25-year-old girlfriend Preeti Nagar, who lived in the same neighbourhood. He convinced his brother-in-law Videsh to help him by suggesting that Savita would get money from insurance policies after his staged death. His employer Honda was obliged to pay his family ₹ 3,600,000 in case of his death; he had another life insurance policy worth ₹ 300,000.

In April 2014, Sharma filed an RTI case against the alleged illegal encroachments on a temple land in Kasna village in Greater Noida. He claimed that he received threats to his life due to this, and filed a first information report (FIR) on 29 April, naming several persons for the threats. He became friendly with a mentally unstable homeless man who used to roam around in the area of his residence. On 1 May 2014, Sharma strangled the homeless man using a belt, with Videsh's help. The two put the dead body on the driver's seat of Sharma's Chevrolet Aveo, poured three litres of petrol on it, and set the car on fire on a desolate stretch near Eldeco Crossing in Greater Noida. By the time the firefighters arrived, the car had been badly burnt and the dead body had been charred beyond recognition.

Meanwhile, Sharma's family tried to call him, but his mobile phone was unreachable. In the morning, Sharma's relatives identified the body as his, through the car's license plate. The police initially suspected that Sharma's car had caught fire, and he could not open the door due to a malfunction of the vehicle's central locking. However, Sharma's relatives alleged that he was murdered for fighting against the land mafia, and accused the police of not acting on the FIR he had filed before his death. On the complaint of a family member, the police lodged a murder case against five people at the Kasna police station.

Sharma's wife Savita was the secretary of the western Uttar Pradesh wing of the Aam Aadmi Party (AAP). On 2 May, the AAP demanded a probe in the alleged murder, and also asked the state government to reprimand the police for their alleged laxity. Two days later, the AAP members organised a candle march in Greater Noida, and shouted slogans against the police. They condemned the alleged police apathy, and threatened to intensify their stir if no arrests were made in the case. The party's leader, Arvind Kejriwal, sought a speedy probe into the alleged murder.

== Investigation and arrest ==
Immediately after staging his own death, Sharma travelled to Bangalore by train. Subsequently, he assumed a new identity as "Nitin Sharma" and shaved his head. He managed to get a job at the Honda plant in Narsapur (Kolar district, Karnataka), with the help of forged marksheets and past work experience. Meanwhile, Honda paid ₹ 2,000,000 to Sharma's family.

On 6 June, around a month after the incident, Sharma's girlfriend Preeti came to Kolar to live with him. Her family filed a missing person report. The police did not know about the relationship between the two at this time, but while investigating the case, they found that the SIM card of her mobile was registered in Sharma's name. By August 2014, Sharma had started finding his new life with Preeti financially taxing. He, therefore, made anonymous calls to her family, telling them about her location and asking them to take her back. The police traced the three calls made between 9 and 13 August to a PCO in Bangalore, which is located at a distance of 50 km from the Honda plant in Narsapur. The investigators were told that a man in Honda uniform had made the calls. Using the CCTV footage and the Honda plant's employee records, they identified the caller as Chandra Mohan Sharma. When confronted, Sharma claimed that his name was Nitin and he was a native of Hisar, Haryana. However, his real identity was confirmed by a tattoo on his hand with the names of his wife and children.

Sharma was arrested on 27 August, in Bangalore. The police also found Preeti, and the two were brought to Noida. He admitted that he had murdered a homeless man to stage his own death.

== See also ==
- Alfred Rouse
