= John Allen (murderer) =

British murderer (1934–2015)

Anthony John Allen (11 June 1934 – 8 August 2015), born Anthony John Angel, was a British murderer who was convicted in 2002 of having murdered his wife and children in 1975. He was a serial offender who had faked his own death in 1967 to escape prosecution for his crimes up to that point.

== Biography ==
Allen was born as Anthony John Angel on 11 June 1934 in Torbay, though he grew up largely in Bournemouth. In the 1950s, he married his first wife, Monica, before being caught stealing money from his workplace in 1966. To escape conviction, he faked his own suicide in 1967 by drowning near Beachy Head, a popular spot for suicides in United Kingdom, leaving a pile of clothes and a suicide note. After assuming a new identity, he met Patricia and married her illegally soon after. In July 1968, Allen was convicted of bigamy and other crimes, receiving a suspended prison sentence. In 1970, Allen was convicted of burning three bags of mail that he was meant to deliver, and spent one year in jail. Allen went on to divorce his first wife and marry Patricia legally in 1972.

By May 1975, Allen and his wife had two children, Jonathan, aged 7, and Victoria, aged 5, and were living in Salcombe, Devon. Allen was also having an affair with Eunice Yabsley. Allen claimed that between 25 and 30 May 1975, he and his wife had an argument and she left, returning two days later to take the children. Allen did not report them missing and none of the three were seen again. His wife's car was later found nearby with dinghy oars inside. Although police investigated at the time, there was insufficient evidence for a prosecution.

In 1992, five years after splitting up with Allen, Yabsley published an autobiographical book, Presumed Dead, focusing on her relationship with Allen and the unsolved mystery. In it was mentioned that Allen had scratches on his arms in May 1975. The police re-opened the murder enquiry in 2001, when they discovered that the man Allen had named as Patricia's boyfriend had suffered a severe stroke in 1972, and so would have been unable to help Patricia in the manner Allen had said. Allen was tried and convicted of the murder of his second wife and his two children (although no bodies were ever found), and sentenced to life imprisonment in 2002.

== Death ==
Allen died on 8 August 2015, still maintaining his innocence.
