= Kim Gordon (designer) =

American interior designer

- Born: Kim Gordon; United Kingdom
- Occupation: Architectural designer
- Children: 2
- Practice: Kim Gordon Designs
- Website: www.kimgordondesigns.com

Kim Gordon is an American artist, architectural designer and interior designer, and the founder of Kim Gordon Designs, a design firm based in Venice Beach, Los Angeles. She has been noted for her use of space, lighting, color, and texture in residential architecture and interior design in Southern California.

== Early life ==
Gordon was born in Long Island and grew up in New Jersey and Puerto Rico.

== Career ==
Gordon began her career building art installations, installing faux finishings, and completing art and design projects. In 2009, she began renovating and reselling residential properties along with her partner, Mauricio Suarez, leading to the foundation of Kim Gordon Designs in 2012. The firm's storefront is located on Santa Monica's Montana Avenue. She worked with designers Kerry Joyce and Mary McDonald (of Million Dollar Decorators) before opening her own practice.

In recent years, her clients have included a number of high profile and high net worth individuals.

== Design ==
Gordon's work is known for open floor plans, emphasis on the use of natural light, and large, signature steel-framed glass walls. She is also known for using aged materials and integrating indoor and outdoor spaces. Her work has also been noted for its balance of practicality and aesthetics and appeal to women.

Her design style is influenced by her experiences traveling, including time spent living in a 16th-century building in Puerto Rico. After her diagnosis with cancer in 2018 and subsequent recovery, her work became more health-conscious and incorporated more natural materials. Since the COVID-19 lockdowns. she has been noted for designs facilitating work from home.

== Projects ==
- Millwood One. A four-bedroom home noted for its layered use of stone textures, privacy, and efficient use of space on a small lot in crowded Venice Beach.
- Laurel Canyon. A 1960's Hollywood Hills home restored with modern design elements while retaining a style evocative of the 1960's counterculture movement.
- Superior Avenue. A new construction on Venice's Superior Avenue praised by critics for its kitchen design, which includes a kitchen island with a built-in hydroponic herb garden.
- Nowita One. A Belgian-inspired farmhouse described as exemplar of Gordon's use of natural lighting, indoor/outdoor integration, and balance of practicality and aesthetics.
- Kingman. A Santa Monica mid-century remodel praised for its use of walnut wood paneling, sky-lit hallways, and outdoor master bathroom.

== Personal life ==
Gordon lives with her partner, Mauricio Suarez and two sons.
