= Kim Avis =

British musician and fugitive, faked his own death

- Other names: Vince Avis; Kem Avis; Ken Gordon-Avis; Kim Gordon; Cameron MacGregor
- Occupations: Musician and market trader
- Known for: Faking his own death
- Convictions: Rape, attempting to rape, sexual assault, failure to appear
- Penalty: 12 years (sex crimes), 3 years (failure to appear)

Details
- Victims: 3
- Country: Scotland

Kim Avis (also known as Vince Avis, Kem Avis, Ken Gordon-Avis, Kim Gordon and Cameron MacGregor) is a British punk rock musician and market trader who fled from Scotland in February 2019 to the United States before faking his own death later that month.

In 2021, Avis was extradited back to Scotland, where he was convicted of sexual abuse offences, including rape. He was sentenced to 12 years for his sex crimes, and three years for matters relating to his failing to appear in court.

His case was the subject of a BBC documentary and podcast.
