= Salt and pepper =

Table condiments for seasoning food

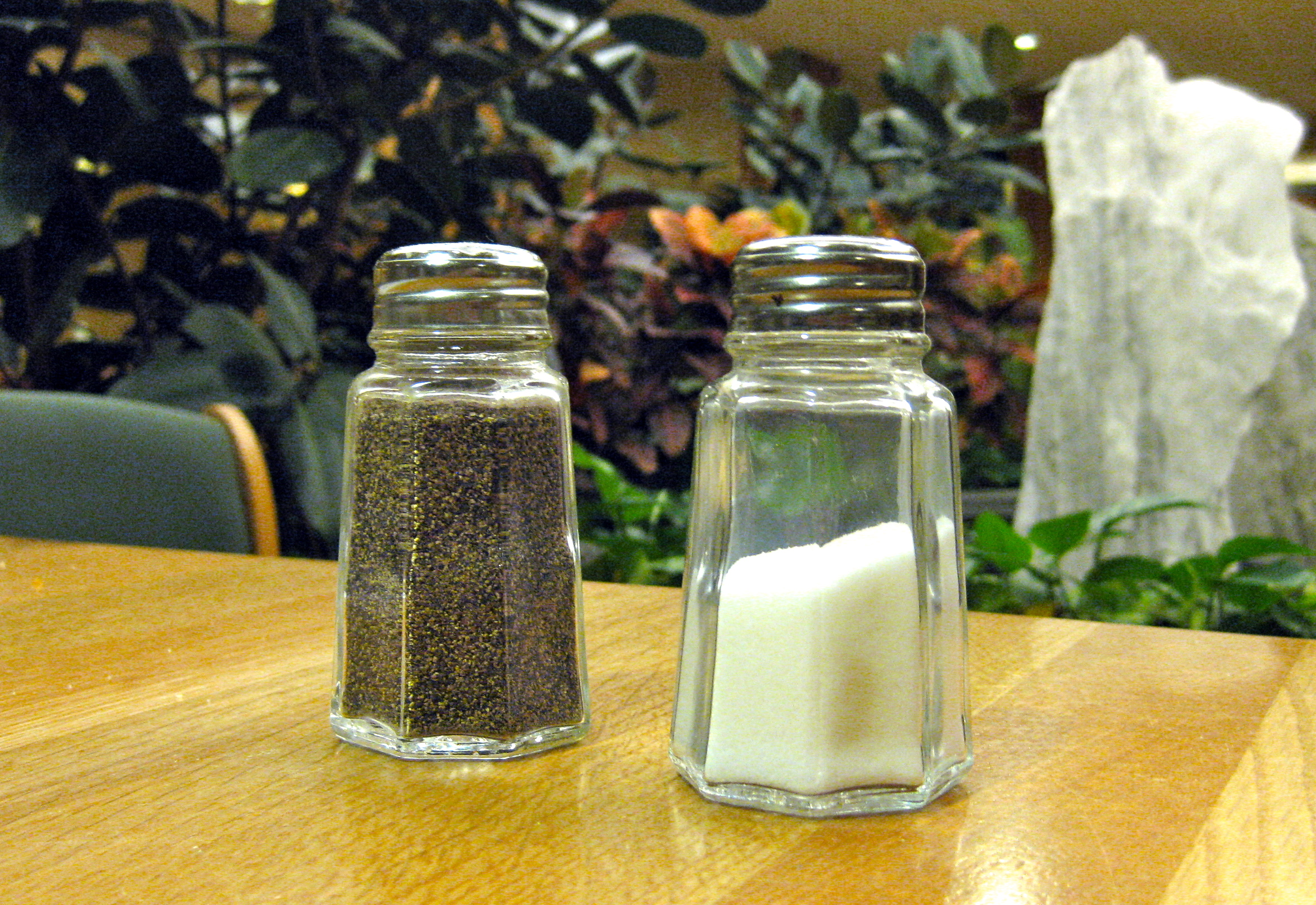
A pair of pepper and salt shakers on a table

Salt and pepper are the common names for edible salt and ground black pepper, which are ubiquitously paired on Western dining tables to allow for the additional seasoning of food after its preparation. During food preparation or cooking, they may also be added in combination.

Salt and pepper are typically maintained in separate shakers on the table, but they may be mixed in the kitchen. They are typically found in a set (pair), often a matched set, of salt and pepper shakers. They may be considered condiments or seasonings; salt is a mineral and black pepper is a spice.

== History ==
Salt is one of the oldest and most ubiquitous food seasonings, and is known to uniformly improve the taste perception of food, including otherwise unpalatable food. Its pairing with pepper as table accessories dates to seventeenth-century French cuisine, which considered black pepper (distinct from herbs such as fines herbes) the only spice that did not overpower the true taste of food. Some food writers like Sara Dickerman have argued that, in modern cookery, a new spice could be used in place of the historic ground black pepper.

== See also ==
- Seasoning
- Spice rub
- Flavoring
- List of culinary herbs and spices
