= List of Alarm für Cobra 11 – Die Autobahnpolizei characters =

This is the list of Alarm für Cobra 11 – Die Autobahnpolizei characters.

== Preview ==
Character	Actor	Position	Seasons																										
Character	Actor	Position	1	2	3	4	5	6	7	8	9	10	11	12	13	14	15	16	17	18	19	20	21	22	23	24	25	26	27
Semir Gerkhan	Erdoğan Atalay	Detective Chief	Main	Main	Main	Main	Main	Main	Main	Main	Main	Main	Main	Main	Main	Main	Main	Main	Main	Main	Main	Main	Main	Main	Main	Main	Main	Main	Main
Katharina Lamprecht	Almut Eggert	Detective Chief, Department Head	Main	Recurring																									
Frank Stolte	Johannes Brandrup	Detective	Main																					Guest					
Ingo Fischer	Rainer Strecker	Detective	Main †																										
Anna Engelhardt	Charlotte Schwab	Detective Chief, Department Head		Recurring	Recurring	Recurring	Recurring	Recurring	Recurring	Recurring	Recurring	Recurring	Recurring	Recurring	Recurring	Recurring	Recurring								Recurring?	Recurring?			
Horst Herzberger	Dietmar Huhn	Officer III		Recurring †	Recurring †	Recurring †	Recurring †	Recurring †	Recurring †	Recurring †	Recurring †	Recurring †	Recurring †	Recurring †	Recurring †	Recurring †	Recurring †	Recurring †											
Dieter Bonrath	Gottfried Vollmer	Officer III		Recurring †	Recurring †	Recurring †	Recurring †	Recurring †	Recurring †	Recurring †	Recurring †	Recurring †	Recurring †	Recurring †	Recurring †	Recurring †	Recurring †	Recurring †	Recurring†?	Recurring†?									
Andrea Gerkhan (née Schäfer)	Carina Wiese	Secretary		Recurring	Recurring	Recurring	Recurring	Recurring	Recurring	Recurring	Recurring	Recurring	Recurring	Recurring	Recurring	Recurring		Recurring	Recurring	Recurring	Recurring	Recurring	Recurring	Recurring	Recurring	Recurring	Recurring		
André Fux	Mark Keller	Detective		Main	Main	Main															Guest †								
Tom Kranich	René Steinke	Detective					Main	Main	Main	Main		Main †	Main †	Main †															
Hartmut Freund	Niels Kurvin	CSU									Recurring	Recurring	Recurring	Recurring	Recurring	Recurring	Recurring	Recurring	Recurring	Recurring	Recurring	Recurring	Recurring	Recurring	Recurring	Recurring	Recurring		
Jan Richter	Christian Oliver	Detective									Main	Main																	
Chris Ritter	Gedeon Burkhard	Detective												Main †	Main †														
Susanne König	Daniela Wutte	Secretary												Recurring	Recurring	Recurring	Recurring	Recurring	Recurring	Recurring	Recurring	Recurring	Recurring	Recurring	Recurring	Recurring	Recurring		
Kim Krüger	Katja Woywood	Detective Chief, Department Head														Recurring	Recurring	Recurring	Recurring	Recurring	Recurring	Recurring	Recurring	Recurring	Recurring	Recurring	Recurring		
Ben Jäger	Tom Beck	Detective														Main	Main	Main	Main	Main	Main						Guest		
Jennifer Dorn	Katrin Heß	Detective																Recurring	Recurring	Recurring	Recurring	Recurring	Recurring	Recurring	Recurring	Recurring	Recurring		
Alexander "Alex" Brandt	Vinzenz Kiefer	Detective																			Main	Main	Main						
Dana Gerkhan	Gizem Emre	Officer III (Plainclothes)																			Recurring	Recurring	Recurring	Recurring	Recurring	Recurring	Main	Main	Main
Paul Renner	Daniel Roesner	Detective																					Main	Main	Main	Main	Main		
Roman Kramer	Patrick Kalupa	Former Department Head (Reassigned 2025)																									Main	Main	Main
Marc Schaffrath	Christopher Patten	Detective																									Main	Main	
Vicky Reisinger	Pia Stutzenstein	Detective																									Main	Main	Main
Max Tauber	Nicolas Wolf	Detective Chief, Department Head (as of 2025)																									Main	Main	Main

== Characters ==
=== Semir Gerkhan ===
Senior Chief Inspector Semir Gerkhan (portrayed by Erdoğan Atalay) has been present since "The New Partner." Outside of his main role, he also held a position as Deputy Head of the Polizei Autobahn Station.

Growing up in Cologne-Kalk, Semir was a criminal in his youth; at the age of 13, he stole cars, but at one point, tried to save the life of a family that crashed into the Rhine, to no avail; the incident traumatized him since. This also destroyed the friendship of his former clique, which excluded juvenile imprisonment. When he went to the German police, he was on odd ends with his father, who would later die of a heart attack (later revealed in "Happy Birthday" to have been caused by poisoning). Semir has repressed his grief and has been estranged from his mother ever since. He has a brother named Kemal and a cousin named Aladdin.

After years of on/off relationship, in "Forever and Ever", Semir marries the secretary of the department Andrea Schäfer and now has two daughters with her, Ayda and Lily. Starting from "Resurrection," Andrea had an affair with a lover called Robert, moving away from Semir with the children, having found his work being much too dangerous for their family, and he was no longer himself for a while. The resignation of his partner at the time, Ben Jäger, further made him unpredictable for a long time. Only when Alex Brandt joins the Cobra 11 team and copes with the current fall with him after initial problems does he regain his self-confidence. In "1983", he and Andrea divorced, but still shared the concern for their children and kept in touch with each other on friendly terms. Since "The Last Night" in the Fall 2014 season, Semir has been reunited romantically with Andrea, finalized a second time by their marriage in "East of Eden". As of "The New," Andrea and their two daughters, Lily and Ayda, have moved to Copenhagen, leaving Semir in Cologne with his mother and illegitimate daughter Dana, who also works as a policewoman. Their relationship was long-distance and seemingly working. However, in three special 90 minutes episodes ("Unversöhnlich", "Machtlos", "Schutzlos"; 2022), it is revealed that the long-distance relationship failed, and Andrea and Semir are once again divorced, the pair splitting this time for good. At first Semir enjoys his single life, but soon finds a new love interest, doctor Bianca Kessler (portrayed by Yasmina Djaballah).

In "72 Hours of Anxiety" Semir learns that he has another daughter, Dana Wegner, from an affair over 11 years ago. Semir has once again more contact with his illegitimate daughter during "At One's Own Risk", through which she was abducted in Brussels and was to be sold as a sex slave, whereupon Semir went to Brussels to save her. With the death of her parents in the latter episode, Semir is all Dana has left; despite their somewhat rocky relationship in later episodes, Semir deeply cares for her and her future, especially after she aspires to become a police officer like her father. In the special three 90 minutes episodes (2022), Dana was in happy relationship with Max, delivering their first baby, making Semir a grandfather.

In "Angel of Death", Semir quits his job for private reasons and voluntarily moves into the LKA, which was formerly regarded by him as a punishment. When his colleague Ben Jäger is dependent on his help in a recent case, he returns to the Cobra 11 team.

"Legacy, Part 2" shows Semir trapped in Istanbul, four months after hearing word of his mother's incarceration; by unknown means, he returns to Cologne six months after in "The New," becoming quickly acquainted with the reformatting of the PAST after his reinstatement. Later episodes, however, reveal what he did in Istanbul: in order to infiltrate the city, he stole 50,000 euros in a deposit box to spend on heroin, having received word of the charges brought against his mother by the local police. While pinning the drugs on crime lord Ahmet Takim, Semir accidentally kills the man and is imprisoned for manslaughter as a result. Post-incarceration, Kiran, Takim's brother who bore witness to the murder, followed the then ex-cop back home only to exact retribution to the latter's mother; he is killed by Semir's most recent partner Vicky, who followed Semir with a gut-feeling, but manages to utter "...he's lying..." before slumping dead.

Max Tauber, Dana's boyfriend and co-worker, initially makes good terms with Semir, but both start to hold grudges at each other after a fight between the former two. This sparks Max's curiosity of the aforementioned skirmish in Istanbul, which he finds out himself through covertly recovered files from the BKA. This culminates in Semir's arrest by the higher agency, and only after evidence is discovered of Semir's actions being within legal restraint is he released. Although Max and Semir eventually make amends, the latter personally supporting the former's relationship with his daughter, Semir ultimately turns himself back in, deciding to come full circle with his actions and resigning from the Autobahn Police altogether; this would be temporary, however, as the case manager presiding over Semir reinstates him fully, leaving his rank otherwise intact. Dana and Max got engaged in 2022 and had their first child.

His iconic silver BMW 3 Series is driven in almost every episode to scrap, though despite all the daring maneuvers and accidents, Semir rarely carries serious injuries. In "Sabotage" and "Friends for Life," however, his car accidents lead to head injuries, both of which result in a several-day coma; in "Between Life and Death," his coma lasts for only several hours, during which he determines the location of a child abductor. "Das Team - Teil 2" reveals that he privately owns a BMW 330i F30, likely the one used prior to his partnership with Vicky.

His sidearm is a Walther P88, which has been his sidearm of choice since the second season; in the first season, and on rare occasions that his P88 is stolen, he makes use of a SIG P225.

=== Katharina Lamprecht ===
Katharina Lamprecht (portrayed by Almut Eggert) was chief of police and former head of the highway police. She was commanding officer to Frank, Ingo, Semir and Andre. She stopped to appear in the series after the 6th episode of the 2nd season without an explanation.

=== Frank Stolte ===
Chief inspector Frank Stolte (portrayed by Johannes Brandrup) was the partner of Ingo Fischer and, later, of Semir Gerkhan. He came from the GSG9, where he shot a terrorist without a gun command. The court said he was free, but the media scolded him. After his death, Frank had to fight hard against the differences with his subsequent partner Semir.

Since the end of the first season, he stopped to appear without explanation.

In "Risk" it came to the reunion with Semir when Frank tried elucidate back in Germany the supposed death of a colleague near Mostar, while uncovering criminal activity of his former employer. It is learned that he changed to the BKA and later into the private economy. He worked in various crisis areas, most recently for a private company in the clearing of landmines in Bosnia-Herzegovina.

=== Ingo Fischer ===
Chief inspector Ingo Fischer (portrayed by Rainer Strecker) was the first partner of Frank Stolte, with whom he is good friends with. This comes to the latter's grief in the second episode, as Ingo took a shotgun blast to the chest, making him the shortest serving character in the series.

=== André Fux ===
In 1997, Chief Inspector André Fux (portrayed by Mark Keller) came to Frank Stolte's exit to the motorway police station. He had a black belt in Karate and exhibits especially outstanding skills in the unarmed combat. In 1999, André was wounded by a harpoon shot on Mallorca. He then falls out of the boat, goes underneath and was missing since then, deemed to have been killed.

In "Resurrection", it is revealed that Fux was found and tended to by a fisherman. He later began a new life and went undercover for the BKA. In the course of the episode, it is also revealed that his wife and his 5-year-old daughter died in a car bombing in 2009. Since then, he has been chasing the murderers of his family. However, it later turned out that Fux had been affiliated with a criminal organization as well, a fact that his former partner, Semir, could not comprehend. Later, following a car accident in the Alps, Semir grabbed his hand on the cliff to hold him, but could not hold him any longer, causing Fux to, following an emotional farewell, fall down a cliff and die. As Fux asked for Semir to further avenge his family in his place, this request perhaps fell on deaf ears.

=== Tom Kranich ===
Chief Inspector Tom Kranich (portrayed by René Steinke) came to the Kripo motorway in 1999 and was the successor of Chief Inspector André Fux. He has a sister who appeared in "Between two stools". His father is a successful night club owner in Cologne.

After Semir Gerkhan had overcome the grief over the loss of his colleague André Fux, he and Tom Kranich developed a real friendliness of men. Later they were also best friends outside the profession. In "Resignation" Tom had to cope with a severe blow when his then pregnant girlfriend Elena Krüger, was killed by a car bomb, which was intended for him. Because of it, he resigned.

For those two years his replacement was Jan Richter.

After two years Tom Kranich, now working as a go-kart instructor, returned at the request of his colleague Semir Gerkhan in "Comeback", after Jan had left. At first, he only wanted to help with a case, but then decided to return to his old life and not to quit. In "Life & Death", Tom was killed when attempting to save a girl from human traffickers.

=== Jan Richter ===
Inspector Jan Richter (portrayed by Christian Oliver) was originally a member of the theft decree. In "Baptism of Fire" he met Semir, when Semir was looking for a new partner, randomly apply to Jan. Since collaboration worked well, he chose Jan. Jan switched to the highway patrol and thus became Semir's new partner.

Jan was also Semir's best men, when Semir married Andrea Schäfer in "Forever and Ever". There is no real explanation for Jan's departure. In the finale of the eighth season, "Extreme", in a plot similar to movie The Fast and the Furious, he went undercover into an illegal car tuning ring, while chasing bank robbers, and fell in love with Indira Abel, the sister of the ringleader Rico, and found out that they were the bank robbers. Indira found out he was a cop, and trapped him under a car inside her garage, intending to blow the garage up. Semir was able to save him, and they chased Indira and Rico to a quarry cliffside. Unwilling to go to prison for life for murder, Indira and Rico committed suicide in front of Jan and Semir's eyes, by driving their car off the cliff. It can be concluded that traumatized by this, Jan has put the job on the nail.

Jan was only particularly mentioned in the subsequent episode "Comeback".

=== Chris Ritter ===
Chief Inspector Chris Ritter (portrayed by Gedeon Burkhard) is Tom's successor. He was a clandestine investigator at LKA Department 60. During an order, he was unmasked by gangsterbones and tortured almost to death. When his colleagues found him, he was already half dead. He returned home, but he was no longer the man he used to be, and his marriage was ruined. He has a daughter and a son, but he does not have much time for it. He has a sister living in London who has a guest appearance in the series. As a result, in "Life and Death" she is kidnapped instead of Chris and to be misused for illegal organ trade. After this, the relationship between the two of them improved after his sister had denied him any contact for two years.

As a result, on "Life and Death", he goes undercover again as Mark Jäger. At first it looks as "Mark Jäger" had killed Tom. Chris, however, convinced Semir in his innocence. Together, they chase Tom's real murderer, who eventually dies in a shot change. Since this case arouses public interest and pictures of Chris are shown in the media, he can no longer work as a covert investigator and switches to the highway police.

First, however, he has great problems, again to determine as a normal policeman. He makes a lot of alleys and his methods of interrogating someone are unqualified for a policeman. In addition, he found it difficult initially to trust Semir. Later, however, the two get together and become private friends. However, this friendship was by no means as tight as with Semir's previous partners, as Chris suffered a severe trauma to his death because of his experiences.

Chris Ritter is shot and killed from a helicopter in an attempt to save a former girlfriend.

=== Ben Jäger ===
Chief Inspector Ben Jäger (portrayed by Tom Beck) is Chris' successor. He was first introduced to Semir in "Auf Eigene Faust", when Semir was chasing Chris' murderer, Sander Kalvus. Although distrustful of him at first, Semir and Ben soon became good friends. Ben is characterized as being an ambitious, often rebellious young officer and later, a similar counterpart to Semir's behavior.

In "Einsame Entscheidung", he left the police after an emotional case, where he was forced to shoot his girlfriend to save Semir, and swore he never wanted to go through something like this again. He left to start his career as a musician in the United States, for which he was given a guitar signed by his colleagues. At the end of the episode, he is seen performing "This Time" in Hollywood with his band "The Backseats".

Ben would briefly return in "Happy Birthday" in 2019, to celebrate Semir's 50th birthday.

=== Alexander Brandt ===
After 2 years in prison for drug deals, Chief Inspector Alexander "Alex" Brandt, née Rickert (played by Vinzenz Kiefer), starts a new life in "Revolution". He is shown with a personality mixed with Andre's and Semir's behaviors; rowdy at times, but willing to get the job done. Alex is first shown leaving prison in the pilot episode of Season 19. However, he owned a gun and a Police ID in his shack, which means he serves the law. He seems to have a good-bad relationship with Semir at first, but later, they become coexistent and cooperative with each other. Sometimes, in a hurry before taking up a chase, he will even take the wheel of Semir's car, using manual shift and scrapping it very few times. Alex also has a relationship with a young boy named Felix Neuberger, who had a few recurring appearances after the pilot episode "The Dark Side". He also appears to have a soft side going with his hardened self, as he shows this with officer Jenny Dorn after the death of Dieter Bonrath.

In "Wind Chimes", Alex met his father, Frank Rickert, who had committed a crime 30 years ago and been in hiding since that. After Frank was killed, Alex broke down completely as he has lost almost every great aspect of his family. This in turn led to his resignation from police, as he is last shown riding his Triumph Thruxton 900 on the autobahn away from the NRW after parting from Semir, intending to go find his mother in Brazil.

=== Paul Renner ===
In the beginning of "Cobra, übernehmen sie!", a young Paul Renner manages to help Semir arrest two criminals on April 7, 1996. 20-years later, he would now become Semir's partner in the Autobahnpolizei, thanks to a transfer arranged by Semir's former boss Anna Engelhardt. Outside of the police work, Paul loves watersports. He is also very worried for his father Klaus (played by Michael Brandner), a former coal miner turned mechanic, who has Alzheimer's disease. In "Die besten letzten Tage", Klaus has been a testperson for a new Alzheimer's drug, which however, increases the probability of cardiac death.

In March 2019, Daniel Roesner announced that he would leave the show after Fall 2019 season. In the show, Klaus' dementia would then worsen, and then in "Brautalarm" Paul announced that he would leave the Autobahnpolizei to care for his father. In the season finale "Vermächtnis (2)", Paul and his father set sail for New Zealand on a sailboat.

=== Vicky Reisinger ===
During Semir's incarceration in Istanbul, detective Vicky Reisinger took over as the head inspector of the Autobahn Police, alongside plainclothes officer Max Tauber. After Tauber is suspended for assaulting a journalist reporting on a kidnapping case, Vicky and Semir are partnered together. Initially, their relationship is turbulent, as Semir would find out of Vicky's past with a racist organized crime unit in Dortmund; however, after she saves her partner, thus proving her loyalty, they grow to become fast friends as well as a great team. A distinction from her and Semir's previous partners is that Vicky at first addressed Semir formally, but has since reverted to casual terms as of 2022.

Her past in Dortmund is haunted by her ex-boyfriend, Marc Schaffrath, who worked in the same unit and with whom she was, for a time, on lesser terms. During an investigation into the Dortmund organized crime unit, Vicky is shot by her former chief. Though she recovers, this is only temporary; her dependence on painkillers to relieve the pain in the aftermath eventually takes its toll and she has to undergo dialysis until she finds a kidney donor. When Marc volunteers as a donor while undercover, this spurs a search by Vicky and Semir that eventually proves life-threatening, during which she is stripped of her police powers; two months later, Vicky's kidney transplant is shown as successful.

== Guest appearance ==
- Nino de Angelo as himself (season 22)
- Diana Amft as Natalie (season 9)
- Bela B. as Joseph Tscherne (season 7)
- Martin Brambach as Ronny Dubinski, the fictional illegitimate son of Erich Honecker (season 22)
- Michael Brandner as Klaus Renner (season 20)
- Fernanda Brandão as Julia (season 19)
- Henning Baum as Rainer Goltz (season 10)
- Blerim Destani as Fero Berisha (season 20)
- Julia Dietze as Lena (season 21)
- Ercan Durmaz as Rumen Brujan (season 22)
- Victor Ferin as Bolzow (season 16)
- Eko Fresh as himself (season 21)
- Hans Peter Geerdes as H.P. Baxxter / Scooter (season 2)
- Jasmin Gerat as Laura Neiser (season 10)
- Frank Giering as Frank Ziegler (season 15)
- Stephan Grossmann as Oliver Wolff (season 19)
- Dorka Gryllus as Nazan Wegener (season 19)
- André Hennicke as Patrick (season 2)
- Heinz Hoenig as Hans Gruber (season 22)
- Charly Hübner as Frank Lukowitz (season 13)
- Sebastian Hülk as Magnus Bischoff (season 21)
- Christoph Maria Herbst as Marcus Krüger (season 3)
- Peter Jordan as Dr. Martin Wenger (season 19)
- Aleksandar Jovanovic as Ruben Frost (season 15)
- Katy Karrenbauer as Patricia Braukmann (season 10)
- Florence Kasumba as FBI Agent Karen Morris (season 23)
- Thomas Kretschmann as Robert Michalke (season 2)
- Gudrun Landgrebe as Marianne Breuer (season 18)
- Dieter Landuris as Behler (season 6)
- Erwin Leder as Django (season 20)
- Manfred Lehmann as Goran Vladic (season 17)
- Sven Martinek as Harald Kollmann (season 7)
- Mišel Matičević as „Shark“ (season 7)
- Lothar Matthäus as himself (season 17)
- Ralf Möller as Andri Vladic (season 17)
- Antoine Monot, Jr. as Torsten Schrage (season 17)
- Jochen Nickel as Norbert Wächter (season 20)
- Jana Pallaske as Hanna Güdemann (season 7)
- Thure Riefenstein as Dalhoff (season 5)
- Ralf Richter as Frank (season 2)
- Anneke Kim Sarnau as Marie Kovacz (season 4)
- Martin Semmelrogge as Willi Schröder (season 3)
- Yevgeni Sitokhin as Kovaci (season 19)
- Jan Henrik Stahlberg as Gerd Decker (season 22)
- Huub Stapel as Sander Kalvus (season 12)
- Bernd Tauber as Paul Scholz (season 17)
- Anatole Taubman as Van Bergen (season 18)
- Simone Thomalla as Susanne Schneider (season 10)
- Sophia Thomalla as Elena Kovic (season 17)
- Christian Tramitz as Harald Flensmann (season 13)
- Erdal Yıldız as Serdal Masaad (season 20)
- Jean-Yves Berteloot as Dufourquet (season 22)
