= Alarm für Cobra 11 – Die Autobahnpolizei season 6 =

German police television drama

Alarm für Cobra 11 – Die Autobahnpolizei
- Season 6
- No. of episodes: 11

Release
- Original network: RTL Television
- Original release: November 9, 2000 – May 31, 2001

Season chronology
- ← Previous; 5 Next → 7

The sixth season of Alarm für Cobra 11 – Die Autobahnpolizei aired between November 9, 2000 and May 31, 2001.

== Format ==
The main cast didn't change in this season.

== Cast ==
- René Steinke as Tom Kranich
- Erdoğan Atalay as Semir Gerkhan

== Episodes ==
No. overall	No. in season	Title	Directed by	Written by	Original release date
59	1	"Lost Memories"	Raoul W. Heimrich	Rob Hüttinger & David Simmons	November 9, 2000
A man walks on the highway and causes an accident. The man, Boris Neumann, is an old colleague of Semir. But Boris doesn't remember Semir or the accident he has caused. Then the dead body of Boris' wife is found in a hotel near to the place of the accident. Boris also doesn't know about the death of his wife. Meanwhile there comes more and more evidence that Boris has murdered his wife. When Tom and Semir confront Boris with their suspicions, he goes mad and flees. A breath-taking chase follows.
60	2	"Janina"	Michael Schneider	David Simmons	November 16, 2000
The body of Jerzy Zaorski is found hanging under a viaduct. Jerzy was a pimp of Polish prostitutes who hated Jerzy and so have a motive for the murder; but, they also they have an alibi: at the time of the murder they were with priest Seilmann. Jerzy's brother Waczlaw comes to Germany to take revenge on the murderer of his brother. He thinks that the prostitute Janina murdered Jerzy and wants to kill her. Tom and Semir have to prevent this.
61	3	"The Mole"	Axel Barth	Andreas Föhr, Thomas Letocha & David Simmons	November 23, 2000
A transport of prisoners is stopped on the highway. One of the prisoners escapes from the van and is taken by two men. Tom and Semir don't know what to think about this incident. In the case they are helped by police-officer Jörg Halbert. A short time later the body of the escaped prisoner is found. Tom and Semir don't understand it anymore, but Halbert does: the criminal Schroth planned the escape of the prisoner. He had heard from Halbert that his brother would be in the transport, but he wasn't. Schroth is furious with Halbert and kidnaps Halbert's son.
62	4	"Checkmate"	Axel Barth	Erdoğan Atalay & Torsten Buchsteiner	December 7, 2000
A group of gangsters rob the antique shop of a man called Breuberg. They want plates to print dollars, which Breuberg has made and which he wants to smuggle to America. Breuberg, however, has brought the plates to a valuables-transport company. Knowing this, the gangsters want to kill Breuberg. Breuberg flees and is involved in a fatal accident. While Tom and Semir are investigating this accident, the gangsters rob the valuables-transport. But not everything goes according to their plan.
63	5	"Schuman's Big Chance"	Axel Barth	Andreas Heckmann & Andreas Schmitz	December 14, 2000
The five-years-unemployed Walter Schumann witnesses an accident on the highway. As soon as he approaches to help one of the victims, the victim—the criminal Grischek—threatens him with a gun. Grischek forces Schumann to flee with him in his car. They drive to the house of Schumann, where Grischek dies not much later. Schumann opens the suitcase which Grischek carries with him: it is filled with money. Schumann sees his chance and wants to keep the money. But the money is stolen and the owner will do everything to get it back.
64	6	"Death Ride on Line 834"	Raoul W. Heimrich	Dieter Tarnowski	April 5, 2001
Four gangsters rob a valuables transport in a spectacular way. During their flight they are stopped by Tom and Semir. After a heavy shooting-affray one of the gangsters flees, a second is killed and the two others hijack a busload of passengers. The police try to stop the bus several times, but are unsuccessful. The tension in the bus increases when the bus is out of fuel. Semir offers to drive the fuel truck which is to supply the bus with new fuel. But then the gangsters demand that Semir replace the wounded bus-driver—and it appears there is a bomb on the bus.
65	7	"Feverdreams"	Carmen Kurz	Ralf Ruland	April 12, 2001
While Semir is chasing a stolen car, the thieves crash into a jeep. One of the two men in the jeep flees into the forest. The other is seriously injured and is transported to the hospital. There the doctors discover that the man, Tadescu, is infected with a deadly virus. Tom and Semir assume that the fled driver Pieter van Heerlen is infected with the virus. Tom and Semir have to find van Heerlen before he spreads the virus and an epidemic breaks out.
66	8	"Death from the Motor"	Axel Barth	Uli Tobinsky	April 19, 2001
On the way to her wedding the bride is involved in an accident in which she doesn't survive. The bridegroom wishes to take revenge on the person who is responsible for the death of his bride-to-be. According to witnesses, Gerd Hagemann, who was also involved in the accident, made a sudden steering-movement which was the start of the accident. With Hagemann now suspected of causing the accident, Bernd goes to the house of Hagemann armed with cudgel. At the same time, Tom discovers that Hagemann, who is threatened with death by Raake, did not cause the accident.
67	9	"Between Two Stools"	Raoul W. Heimrich	Hans G. Müller-Welters	May 3, 2001
Tom and Semir escort a BKA-organized transport of the crown-witness in the case against gangster Lorenz. His wife wants to testify against him as a crown-witness. What the BKA doesn't know is that there is a mole, who gave the transport-plans to Lorenz. Lorenz orders an attempt to be made on his wife's life during the transport. Thanks to Tom and Semir Frau Lorenz survives this attempt. The BKA then asks the help of Tom and Semir in protecting Frau Lorenz from her husband. When Lorenz discovers this, he kidnaps Tom's sister.
68	10	"Crash Course"	Carmen Kurz	Ekki Voigt & David Simmons	May 10, 2001
Former stuntman Danny Tochtermann obtains money for his sister to undergo an expensive operation by performing illegal stunts on the highway. These crashes are filmed by Weber who sells the "crash videos" for a lot of money via the internet. In one of the crashes an innocent driver is killed. Tom and Semir investigate the accident and trace Danny. Weber is afraid that Danny will tell everything to the police and thinks of a plan. This time, Danny is to perform a stunt which, as far as Weber is concerned, he won't survive.
69	11	"Loved to Death"	Axel Barth	Ralf Ruland	May 31, 2001
When Andrea is on her way to work, she flirts with the driver of an Opel on the highway. Suddenly a Volvo drives into the back of the Opel resulting in a big accident. The Volvo doesn't stop after the crash, but with the help of the driver of the Opel a sketch is made of the driver of the Volvo. When Andrea sees this drawing, she is shocked: it is her ex-boyfriend Patrick. A few weeks ago she ended her relationship with him, but he still wants to marry her. Tom and Semir discover that Patrick will do anything to marry Andrea, when they find his Volvo near the highway.
