= Alarm für Cobra 11 – Die Autobahnpolizei season 7 =

German police television drama

Alarm für Cobra 11 – Die Autobahnpolizei
- Season 7
- No. of episodes: 14

Release
- Original network: RTL Television
- Original release: November 8, 2001 – May 2, 2002

Season chronology
- ← Previous; 6 Next → 8

The seventh season of Alarm für Cobra 11 – Die Autobahnpolizei aired between November 8, 2001 and May 2, 2002.

== Format ==
The main cast didn't change in this season.

== Cast ==
- René Steinke as Tom Kranich
- Erdoğan Atalay as Semir Gerkhan

== Episodes ==
No. overall	No. in season	Title	Directed by	Written by	Original release date
70	1	"Schmolder's Dream"	Ralf Ruland	Axel Barth	November 8, 2001
Tom and Semir persecute traffickers diamonds, traveling in two cars. Tom Semir get between them and with outstretched gun on himself shouting. One of the traffickers shot, but hit the driver of the other car, which catapulted them from a bridge. The car explodes upon impact. A homeless man finds Schmölder the wagon suitcase with one million DM. Schmölder goes to his friend Jupp make his boast. Tom Semir already looking for money and they are not alone. The owner of money Matuschek wants them back immediately to deploy his men. Schmölder making his dream trip to Canada, he must reconcile with her daughter. Now goes to the salon, where from it will make dandy. Bonrath arrested Jupp, who now Tom and Semir heard. Since Jupp was not very helpful, so Bonraht tasked to watch. Jupp as usual begging on its fixed location. Schmölder came to him and he had no idea that he is on his heels Matuschekovy men. Bonrath gave buzz Semir and Tom. Those after a long chase city bathed in concrete. Semir mishandled his BMW crashed into a mixer which they passed their cargo in the trunk. Schmölder Jupp and hid in one of their friends. The second day Schmölder headed for her daughter and reconciled with her. Matuschek discovered skrýž Jupp and immediately he sent his men who brutally Jupp left. When it Schmölder learned so immediately decided to cooperate with the police and return the money. Tom and Semir Schmöldera used as a decoy in order to Matuschek arrest. During the firefight Matuschek attempt to escape. He arrives far - in the old tunnel's journey ends. Tom and Semir have another problem - lost money. Immediately they went to the airport and seeing the contented Schmölderovou daughter, so they decided to keep them.
71	2	"Double Nightmare"	Carmen Kurz	Anni Grossmann	November 15, 2001
Tom arrived for his old colleague Peter. In a traffic jam on the highway noticed Semira how to manage the operations. Tom called him and explained to him that with Petra going to explore the area, but first stop at the nearest gas station. When they arrived at the gas station and Petra went for coffee. In the shop were just thieves, and one of them fired Petru without embarrassment. When Semir arrived at the gas station and saw what had happened, he immediately gave chase thieves. However, they caused an accident on the highway and they managed to escape. Tom and Semir immediately begin a search. The next morning, Tom learned that Peter had died in the night. Tom furiously engaged in the search for her killer. The first clues leading to the site, where Tom knows one of the robbers - Jens Habermann. Habermann also recognized Tom and right in front of him fleeing. Seize mixers, which causes several accidents. Tom followed him to his apartment. Jens walks into the apartment and sees his colleague with his girlfriend. Tom sets out the apartment door and pointed the gun goes to Jens. Tom stuns second thief, who also shot Jens Tom's arms. Tom is immediately accused of murder and suspended. Semir do not believe that Tom Habermann cold-bloodedly murdered and so embarks himself into the investigation. Semir morning went to the bar to Peters, who is Jensovou girlfriend and startled her, so she panicked and also put it in his bag bug. Peters, as envisaged Semir, went for Dräger Jensovým killer. Semir and Tom followed her, and they know that they want to fly to the US and nachystalina them at the airport past. But how it came only half - failed to arrest Drager, who is the murderer of Petra and Jens. He was captured after a shootout and a fight with Tom at the airport.
72	3	"Tina and Aysim"	Axel Barth	David Simmons	November 22, 2001
On the highway parking Steeg bought drugs from Vecchioneho pimp who wanted to earn some money. After leaving Steeg got from his boss Bohmer command Pasáková liquidation and get him back money for drugs. Pasáková car literally shot down the highway and then he pulled out his wreck briefcase with money. On the way to the boss met Steeg and Tina Aysim and offered them that would take them home. Steeg was drugged and molested the two girls. Tina used Steegovou inattention and seized his car. Aysim father Semir came to the station and asked him for help in tracing Aysim who did not come home. A few moments later came the news that two girls in a black Jaguar caused the accident. Now the girls searched not only the police but also Steeg, who wanted her money back, and drugs that remained in the car. Tina was clear that after the accident, police were looking for them, and so he "borrowed" blue Lexus. By then drove up to the police control on the highway. In the column he saw Tina and Steeg, so she had no choice but to pass inspection. Shrugging off him after he Aysim thrown under the wheels of cars drugs. Tom and Semir find out where the girls headed. Their goal was the port of De Haan in Belgium. Tina did not believe Steeg shook so again exchanged the car. Tom Semir were already on their way to them in a helicopter. As soon as the girls arrived in town, she went to the sea. There he waited longer Steg, who drove them into the sea. Semir had to jump from a helicopter to Aysim who could not swim. Tom chased the moving Stega on bugyn. His attempt to escape a halt to Semir, who ran his way with a rented car.
73	4	"High Speed"	Raoul W. Heimrich	Stefan Dauck & Christian Heider	December 6, 2001
After the highway is rushing black Golf and its driver is wearing a mask of a pig. Tom Semir on regular patrol and when a madman noticed in the rearview mirror, commented: "overtook me a pig." Piglet immediately began to chase. Suddenly the roof Golfa erect figure with an inscription on the shirt. On a nearby bridge has already been pre-informed journalists and the entire output of pig took pictures. Pig on the highway caused a serious accident. Klaus Weller, who drove the car dealer and Golf has desperately needed loan. Unfortunately banker Holger Mackeroth did not give him credit because he himself big financial problems. Journalist Stegemannová began a pig motorway interest and coincidentally was Mackeroth her boyfriend. Seeing the photo shoot golf, immediately he recognized the car and knew who it was. The second day went a newspaper with photos on the front page. On the shirt was a sign: "Tina, will you marry me?" When he went to Klaus for his fiancée for a response, he received a clear 'no'! A moment later Stegemannová appeared in Klaus's workshop and began to blackmail him. Klaus should choose a bank, otherwise the police know who it's from a pig highway. Klaus has no choice - robbed a bank and drives a car to replace the multi-storey garage, where he will give swag Stegemannové. Tom and Semir already in the garage waiting for Klaus. The wild chase after losing control of the car and come out of the garage. Subsequent Expertise demonstrated that someone damaged brake. Before long, the hospital will Stegemannová with the clear intention - to silence Klaus. Tom and Semir have noticed it in time, but Stegemannová Crush highway where just blast the bridge. Semir at the insistence of Tom prefer to stop. The bridge was detonated just as underneath Stegemannová passed.
74	5	"Hostile Brothers"	Axel Barth	Arne Nolting & Martin Scharf	December 13, 2001
On the highway construction Ludwig Solms gets masked man who seizes the dredger. With his help throughout the site smash. When demolished, there will be an accident on the highway. The case of getting Tom and Semir. They immediately issued for Ludwig Solms that heard it and also see if he had any suspicions. Solms, of course, the culprit was - his brother Georg. Brothers not talking about the legacy of his father. Ludwig had spadělat will last so that the whole company seemed to him and his brother got nothing. Site manager Karl knew about all the fraud and blackmailing Ludwig. Karl was to meet with Ludwig in the building at the cell site. Instead arrived Ludwig Georg, who was lured to the building. Before his very eyes the cell exploded, Georg gives frantic escape. Georg was seen on site by one worker. Tom and Semir immediately issued to George. He'll miss him when Semir cancels his BMW at a crossroads. Tom and Semir Charles after searching the apartment to find documents confirming that his brother Ludwig really robbed. Georg completely panicked and kidnapped his brother, he is bringing to the old company headquarters. Georg told her his wife, and that it immediately call Tom and Semir. Georg forced with a gun brother to tell the truth. The exploits of George's surprise and seize weapons. Ludwig obsession, but he has at his heels Semir and Tom. Ludwig far it arrives in port can not handle his car and crashes it into the water.
75	6	"Black Widow"	Raoul W. Heimrich	Rafael Sola-Ferrer	December 20, 2001
After highway driving at high speed red sports car. When passing a black driver Golf is a sports car, shot in the head. Sports car then přelítne in the opposite direction which causes the accident. The case comes to the care of Tom and Semir. They immediately set out for the murdered girlfriend. That, he did not particularly grieve, which gave Semir and Tom crisply clear. Man of the sports car was a link between the drug dealers in France and Germany. German traders procured by private deal at the expense of the French. French gang boss to let go unnoticed and engaged in disposing of their inconvenient business partners killer. Tom and Semir get to solve the case backup - Silvia VanDelor Interpol. Tom and Semir according to ancient records trace of one of the accomplices Hofman. When she visits him, so he tries to escape. Tom and Semir banish him to the old ironworks where Hofman collapse. Silvie it will arrive first, and wounded Hofman kills. Now it is more than clear who is the hired killer. Tom is in love with Silvia. That for him for some reason has to suddenly leave. Silvie goes after another of the conspirators, which he manages to kill her. When Tom Semir go after the last of the conspirators boss Tom announces that Silvia is dead. A few minutes later, Andrea discovers that the woman who was with them at all Silvie VanDelor not. Tom found it at the last of the conspirators with a gun in his hand, and he shoots her and she later died in the arms of Tom. Meanwhile Semir arrests last of traders.
76	7	"Truckstop"	Raoul W. Heimrich	Stefan Dauck & Christian Heider	March 14, 2002
Rolf Lehmann, real estate dealer, is a man without scruples. Owns several building plots, which mostly hires. For example roadhouse Truckstop, whose manager is a popular Monika Wagner. In this case, Lehmann gets into trouble because once rented land wants to clean up and sell for a profit to the investor who wants to build at the site of a large shopping center. It seems like a big deal for Lehmann, but life tragedy for Monica, who now fulfilled his life's dream. Lehmann decides to use criminal methods to get rid of Monica. The case is assigned to Tom Semir. Monika retains his business?
77	8	"Foul Play"	Carmen Kurz	Ralf Ruland	March 21, 2002
Karl Schmidt, real estate dealer, and his helicopter crashes near the highway. Survive the accident. Investigations show that someone intentionally damaged the machine: the hose from the oil pump was cut off. According to witnesses they manage to assemble a portrait of the perpetrator. Officers from the team Kobra is clear that they have the honor to Max, coincidentally brother Semirovy first love. A Max would also respectable motive: his father was recently cheated just by Karl Schmidt. Max had robbed a bank to help his father out of financial difficulties. And just shortly after Max was released from prison, Schmidt fell off his machine.
78	9	"Short Luck"	Raoul W. Heimrich	David Simmons	March 28, 2002
Anna Engelhardt fell in love. Her colleagues are happy acquaintance of her sincere joy. The only one who is jealous Herzberger. Phillip, Anna's chosen one, the successful owner of a real estate office. He decides to surprise her with a marriage proposal romantic in Paris. On the way to the city of romance and love but few stranger assaults and Anna's weapons kill Philippe. But where is Anna? None of their colleagues do not believe that the mere Anna was somehow involved in the murder. Herzberger has on its parent sincere fear and fears the worst. Commissioner Schulte and his team, however, believe that Anna is the real and only culprit. In addition, Schulte freed Semir and Tom powers to investigate. But they ignore and venturing into the search on your own. They get so damn on thin ice. Anna is perhaps in danger of life and, moreover, she was in danger from their own ranks: Schult be accused of murder.
79	10	"Matter of Horror"	Axel Barth	Andreas Heckmann & Andreas Schmitz	April 4, 2002
After highway driving military convoy. A truck carrying a gun and ammunition without a clear reason brakes. This happened in the truck explodes and releases the driver's cabin. The driver - Corporal Ekers is killed instantly. Tom investigating the case himself, as Semir teaches at the Police School. Tom goes to the barracks, where Ekers served. In these barracks "association" Copia Honoris - Unit honor even Ekers was a member. Members of this unit recognize only one world - one in the barracks. What is behind their gates for them dirt. Tom was with Corporal Simon, who was Ekersův roommate. Simon knows something, but his commander Ric had made it clear that it does not ceknout. Tom had invited Simon to the station. The place for questioning had to exercise, in which he tried to kill Ric commander, but Simon managed to escape. Conflict with Ric injured and his blood remained in the car, which Ric Simon off the road. Tom is furious - two dead in the same unit, and none of their friends will not talk. The commander of the barracks blames Rico undue dead. At the funeral of two soldiers commander has a very touching speech. Tom let him investigate and discover that he recently lost his daughter, who overdosed on heroin. Tom is already clear why he had to die Ekers. Smuggle heroin across the border and the commander of the barracks took justice into their own hands. Tom goes to the barracks arrested for murder Ekerse Rice and Simon. Rico manages to cover a Tom commander of the barracks chasing him. They will arrive at the precipice where we manage to arrest Tom Rice.
80	11	"The Racing Team"	Raoul W. Heimrich	Manfred Berger & David Simmons	April 11, 2002
Timo has a race car needs a new engine in it, to which he has no money. Therefore, he and his friend Bernd decided to steal a car. Eye on a black Audi A8. When the car owner saw him steal a car, he began shooting them. At the same time he arrived at the park with Semir and Tom began to act now. Semir disarmed the owner of the car and chased Tim Tom, but he lost him. When the car drove into the garage and the car checked Bernd found the suitcase in which the documents listing bribes. Dr. Bernd contacted Krävna, the owner of the car, and wanted him money. When handing money Bernd Dr. Krävnovi announced that it is just a backup. Bernd documents have appreciated to one million DM. Kraven Bernd wanted to frighten, so he sent him to his cronies. They damaged the brakes before the race at Tim's race car. On the circuit, Bernd hear, Tom arrived with Semira. Bernd to avoid the police, exiting the track with the car unaware that has damaged the brakes. Bernd not handle a speeding car and cruise the track. In the wreck of the car dies. Timo wants to avenge his friend, and so it is with Krävnem himself. Tom and Semir searched Berndovu workshop, where they found copies of documents Krävnových. Timo let his girlfriend Manu on the answering machine message that has an appointment with Krävnem and then they will fly together to the United States. But this idea that Manu Kraven kidnapped as insurance. Tom and Semir find in the apartment wink Tim, who take on the analysis. By the sound they know that the meeting is held on one dam, and soon there will be issued. Kraven did not want any witnesses, and therefore wanted to kill Tim and Manu. This zabrálil Semir Tom and Dr. Krävna fared.
81	12	"The Little One"	Carmen Kurz	Andreas Schmitz & Andreas Heckmann	April 18, 2002
Black BMW squeezed out of the blue van highway, which runs boy with his father Robert, who has problems with the mafia. Both survive the accident and Robert in the hospital draws a tattoo of one of the mobsters. Mafia's attempt to finish in the hospital, but Tom and Semir guess at everything and protect the boy. They decide to hide in Robert Andrey, but the mafia is track down a wall provětrají Andreina flat bullets. No one gets hurt, only one mobster then survive an accident during the chase Semir and Tom. The station can be picked up for Robert corrupt colleague of VKA, which he had to transfer to a safe place. Tom and Semir But Robert rescue and arrest all the corrupt policemen and their accomplices. The boy and his father will get a new identity and a new life can begin.
82	13	"Black Sheep"	Axel Barth	Elke Schilling & Thomas Schwank	April 25, 2002
The truck driver stopped for routine road checks and drives. The policemen chasing him. Fleeing driver crashes into truck in the opposite direction and both drivers are killed. Semir and Tom are trying to determine why the driver vyhul check if the car had even load fine. The quest leads them to a group of corrupt cops who are blackmailing drivers and transport companies to enforce their ransom.
83	14	"Blackout"	Raoul W. Heimrich	Markus Hoffmann	May 2, 2002
Police chasing a car that caused the accident. When the car stops, drops him Semir, wounded, drunk and stoned. Semir wakes up in the hospital, but did not remember where he was and how he got into the car. Because there is a suspicion that dazed state ran over and killed a man, he must Engelhardtová exempt services. Tom and Andrea Semira trying to cleanse the suspicions. The track is fed into the private Turkish club and slowly begin to unravel a story of revenge, which has its roots in the past.
