= Alarm für Cobra 11 – Die Autobahnpolizei season 5 =

German police television drama

Alarm für Cobra 11 – Die Autobahnpolizei
- Season 5
- No. of episodes: 11

Release
- Original network: RTL Television
- Original release: December 16, 1999 – March 24, 2000

Season chronology
- ← Previous; 4 Next → 6

The fifth season of Alarm für Cobra 11 – Die Autobahnpolizei aired between December 16, 1999 and March 24, 2000.

== Format ==
René Steinke joined the cast.

== Cast ==
- René Steinke as Tom Kranich
- Erdoğan Atalay as Semir Gerkhan

== Episodes ==
No. overall	No. in season	Title	Directed by	Written by	Original release date
48	1	"Hell of a Trip on The A4"	Raoul W. Heimrich	Dieter Tarnowski	December 16, 1999
The first day for Tom Kranich at the highway-police starts spectacularly: on the way to his new office he his mountain-bike collides with an old Mercedes. His bike is broken and the driver of the Mercedes, Susanne, offers to bring Tom to the office of the highway-police. She herself is with her cousin on their way to Aachen. Also in the car is the businessman Ed, who has an important meeting in Aachen. Susanne just got her car back from a garage. However, something went wrong there: on the highway the accelerator pedal of the car stuck. The Mercedes roars with more than 160 km per hr on the highway and cannot be stopped.
49	2	"Blind Love"	Michael Karen	Ralf Ruland	January 6, 2000
Tom and Semir are chasing a car, which drives dangerously along the highway. The car causes an accident, in which a woman is injured. In the hospital it appears that the woman has lost her memory temporarily. In her handbag Tom and Semir find a passport, from which they determine her name to be Maria. However, this passport is forged. They also find a restaurant receipt in her bag. Maria cannot remember the pass nor the bill. The boss of the restaurant does remember Maria and that she had dined with two men. The men went by cab to a hotel. Tom and Semir go off to find the men at the hotel, but when they are standing in front of the door of their room, they are being shot at.
50	3	"Tulips from Amsterdam"	Matthias Tiefenbacher	Iris Anna Otto & Susanne Mischke	January 13, 2000
On the highway, Tom and Semir see a bus lurching across the road. The driver jumps out of the bus and the bus goes down a slope. The bus passengers are slightly wounded. In the bus are found small bags filled with heroine. It appears that the passengers of the bus, all occupants of a residence for seniors, earn extra income on top of their pension by transporting heroine from Amsterdam to Germany. One of the occupants of the residence, Bärle, is the person who takes care of everything. But Bärle has a problem: Krollov, who paid Bärle and the other occupants, wants Bärle's heroine or his money. When Bärle cannot fulfill his demands, Krollov begins to murder the occupants of the residence.
51	4	"A Nasty Surprise"	Raoul W. Heimrich	David Simmons	January 19, 2000
Two brothers rob a bank near the highway. When they count the loot, it appears that there is 1.5 million dollars in it. What they don't know is that the chief of the bank, Reiser, works with criminals. The stolen money was laundered by Reiser and belongs to the criminals. When the criminals take notice of the bank robbery, they send a killer to the brothers. Tom and Semir have meanwhile identified the two brothers and want to pay them a visit. But the killer is also on his way to the brothers.
52	5	"Hare & Hedgedog"	Diethard Küster	Andreas Heckmann & Andreas Schmitz	February 10, 2000
When Tom and Semir are driving on the highway, they are suddenly overtaken by a very fast cart. The cart drives up to a car and the cart-driver places a bomb on the car. Tom and Semir cannot prevent the cart-driver from detonating the bomb. The driver of the car, a man called DeBreer, is killed and the cart-driver flees. Tom and Semir discover that the cart belongs to Alexander Vollberth, and he says that he doesn't know anything about the bomb. When Jennifer Vollberth turns up with a black eye, Tom and Semir think the case is solved. Jennifer is the wife of Alexander and had a relationship with DeBreer. On finding this out, Alexander killed DeBreer. But soon it seems that Tom and Semir have to change their theory.
53	6	"Highwaye Maniac"	Matthias Tiefenbacher	Uli Tobinsky	February 17, 2000
A person shoots at the tires of a car driving on the highway. The car turns upside down and the occupants are killed. Later he lobs grenades on passing cars. With the help of some eye-witnesses Tom and Semir discover the identity of the person responsible. His name is Joe and they have the address of his mother. Semir leaves his visiting card with the mother. Shortly afterward, Joe comes to his mother and finds the card. He goes to the house of Semir. When Semir arrives home, a big surprise is in store for him.
54	7	"On the Run"	Diethard Küster	Andreas Föhr & Thomas Letocha	February 24, 2000
A prisoner-transport is involved in an accident on the highway. In the chaos, one of the prisoners, Walter Fromm, flees in a car after he has taken hold of a gun. Tom and Semir lose him near the start of the chase. Fromm goes to the house of Lisa Bertram. She was one of the hostages during a bank robbery for which Fromm has gone to jail. Meanwhile the fleeing car is found and Tom and Semir have an idea in which neighborhood Fromm is. This neighborhood is then surrounded by the police. Tom and Semir believe that Fromm will easily be found, but it turns out that Lisa wasn't just a hostage of Fromm during the robbery.
55	8	"Dangerous Toys"	Stephen Manuel	Stefan Dauck & Christian Heider	March 2, 2000
Two boys have a dangerous idea: one of them, Sven, holds onto a driven truck while he is wearing skates. The other boy, Joachim, follows the truck. On the highway, Sven almost loses his balance and climbs into the truck. There he finds many weapons. When the truck stops, Sven fleesw from the truck. After some phone calls with drivers on the highway, Tom and Semir start looking for the boys. Also they are asked by the LKA to help them in an endeavor to arrest some weapons dealers. What they don't know is that there is a link between both cases.
56	9	"Mysterious Power"	Axel Barth	Uli Tobinsky	March 9, 2000
The courier Enrico Serpente drives on the highway with a suitcase full of money. Behind him appears a car driven by the LKA-agent Laura Wagner. With a strange apparatus she aims at Serpente's car and pushes a button. His car goes out of control and crashes. Laura stops near the wreck, gets the suitcase of money and leaves a grenade in the car of Serpente. A little later the wreck explodes and Serpente is killed. Tom and Semir hear from an eyewitness what has happened and they try to find Laura's Opel. When they are driving, they see the Opel car. They follow the car and not much later they witness how Laura causes several cars to crash with the help of her mysterious apparatus.
57	10	"The Cabin on the Lake"	Stephen Manuel	Lorenz Stassen	March 16, 2000
Four men rob a money-transport on the highway. They flee dressed as hunters and hide themselves in a log cabin at a quiet lake. On the other side of the lake there is a cabin. in which Semir and Andrea are having a romantic vacation. When Semir wants to know the results of a soccer game, he goes to the cabin of the four men. On getting to know that Semir is a cop, they take Semir and Andrea hostage.
58	11	"The Black Rose"	Raoul W. Heimrich	Ralf Ruland	March 24, 2000
At a police-control a van flees. Tom and Semir are sent to stop the van. After a wild chase through a pleasure ground the van crashes into a building and explodes. In the van rare detonators are found. These detonators lead Tom and Semir on the trail of the widow of the international weapons dealer, Sascha May. The widow, Carla May, says that she knows nothing about the detonators. Later the car of one of the co-operators of Carla explodes. In the wreck, building plans are found. After a quick investigation, it is suspected that an attempt will be made on the Israeli embassy. Tom and Semir go to Carla to ask if this is true, but before they get an answer, Carla is murdered.
