= Alarm für Cobra 11 – Die Autobahnpolizei season 1 =

German police television drama

Alarm für Cobra 11 – Die Autobahnpolizei
- Season 1
- No. of episodes: 9

Release
- Original network: RTL Television
- Original release: March 12 – May 7, 1996

Season chronology
- Next → 2

The first season of Alarm for Cobra 11 – The Highway Police aired between March 12, and May 7, 1996.

== Format ==
The main cast at the beginning of the series were Johannes Brandrup as Frank Stolte, Rainer Strecker as Ingo Fischer and Almut Eggert as Katharina Lamprecht. Strecker left the cast after the episode "Red Rose, Black Death", where his character was killed off, and was replaced by Erdoğan Atalay as Semir Gerkhan in the episode "The New Partner". Johannes Brandrup departed from the series after the season finale.

== Cast ==
- Johannes Brandrup - Frank Stolte
- Rainer Strecker - Ingo Fischer (episodes 1−2)
- Erdoğan Atalay - Semir Gerkhan (episodes 3−9)
- Almut Eggert - Katharina Lamprecht

== Episodes ==
No. overall	No. in season	Title	Directed by	Written by	Original release date
1	1	"The Bomb On 92nd Kilometer"	Leo Zahn	Claude Clueni	March 12, 1996
A new case for Chief Justice Commissioner Frank Stolte and Chief Justice Commissioner Ingo Fischer. A bomb disguised as a crabbose detonates at a motorway extinguishment. Two road workers survive with scarce need. Immediately, the perpetrator appears with Richie Weber, who had just threatened with bombs along the highway. Shortly thereafter, a junkyard bursts in. The stolen items are found a little later with a cassette and a tin figure near the motorway. On the cassette, a certain "Rascar Capac" emerges as the author of the bombing. He calls for 1 million DM in cash and one kilo of gold. In the trumpet, the commissioners find out that "Rascar Capac" is a figure from a Tintin comic. After a failed ransom transfer, a construction site is converted, so that it comes to a mass carambola. For Frank, a cat-and-mouse game begins. First he is sent by the bomber to a swimming pool, but when Ingo appears, "Rascar Capac" sends Frank to a museum. There, however, the money transfer failed as a museum guardian steals the sack with the money it contains. After this ransom money transfer failed, the policeman Marcus Bodmar is seriously injured by an attack by "Rascar Capac" and warns the commissioners before further attacks. Director-General Katharina Lamprecht has to fight with the press after the attacks. But the case takes an unexpected turn when it is found that the explosive used by Rascar Capac was used by the terrorist Khalid Masharid. This, however, is in prison. Even in a conversation with the terrorist, the commissioners do not come any further. Only by a tip of the injured Marcus Bodmar, who has read all Tintin comics in the hospital, the commissaries find the explosives, which Khalid had once used, in a disused highway bunkers. When the commissaries tell the terrorist that they have found their explosives, they also find out that it is Steve Kröger, a former prisoner who has revealed to Khalid the location of his explosive, and who is hiding behind the pseudonym "Rascar Capac". Now comes a final final ransom, in which Kröger sends Frank through the whole city and later throws the money in a hotel by a laundry suit. But Kröger is also being followed by Ingo and Anja Heckendorn, who is new to the team as a substitute for Bodmar. It begins a chase, in which Frank jumps to the roof of Kröger's car. In the end, Kröger rides his car into a freight train and can be arrested easily, but he promises to return.
2	2	"Red Rose, Black Death"	Tomy Wigand	Clementine Hegewisch	March 19, 1996
The police commissariat is given indications that protective gel compressors put pressure on the tenants of the motorway detention centers. Frank is to take care of the matter, but has other concerns quite private. His girlfriend Mareike has ended up with him because she is very sorry to play the second violin in his life after his professional ambitions. When the young Commissioner appears in Mareike's resting place, Waldenau, because he wants to ask her forgiveness, Mareike flirts before his eyes with Harry, one of her guests. Frank assumes that she is her new lover. The jealousy makes him so that he can not concentrate properly on his work. In the meantime, Mareike notes that Harry is one of the most vulnerable. He threatens her consequences if she does not pay him for his services. A little later, Mareike must look helpless, as a squad group in the shadow of the dark shatter their convertible. A truck driver, who intervenes, finds death in consequence of the argument. When Ingo Fischer interviewed Mareike about the Tathergang, she is silent completely frightened. The chief commissioner decides to supervise Mareike from now on. Frank tries to find the holder of Harry's Porsche. It turns out that the car is the exact duplicate of another vehicle. On the radio, Frank informs his partner Ingo, who follows Mareike on the motorway. He observes how she meets a parking bay with Harry for the money transfer. Ingo decides to intervene and surprise Harry. A fateful decision ...
3	3	"The New Partner"	Peter Vogel	Fritz-Müller Scherz	March 26, 1996
Frank Stolte is very bad at the death of his partner Ingo Fischer. In addition, he still needs a rebel from his superiors, district director Katharina Lamprecht. Against his will, she shares him with a new partner: Criminal Commissioner Semir Gerkhan, not a daredevil, but a man who thinks before he acts. Frank has great problems at first with the new colleagues warm up. Despite these "start-up difficulties", the two commissioners have to deal with an important case: for some time expensive luxury cars are stolen just hours after their purchase. Most of these vehicles come from the Raabe car dealership. The perpetrators leave no traces, the cars are swallowed as if from the ground. During a routine ride on the highway, Semir discovers a stolen luxury limousine on a transporter. When Semir and Frank want to stop the transporter, Waldemar, the head of the car sling, provokes an accident with the help of his accompanying vehicle. He calls on Hansi, the driver of the van, to cross the two policemen. When he refuses, Waldemar shoots him coldly. In his shelter he is already waiting for a computer hacker, who informs him when the next deliveries arrive at the car dealerships. Semir and Frank persuade the owner of the car house Raabe to help them to trap the cars. You are buying one of the luxury limousines. As planned, the gangsters try to steal the car. One of the autodiebe goes to the police thereby into the net. When he learns that his boss has shot one of his accomplices without an eyelid, he tells Semir and Frank Waldemar's shelter. Together with a SEK unit, the two commissaries storm the headquarters of the cars. Here Frank is in mortal danger.
4	4	"Blood & Thunder"	Peter Vogel	Fritz-Müller Scherz	April 2, 1996
There is an intimate relationship between the intellectually disabled Anton and the Hungarian Katja. Often they spend their time together. When Katja follows her work on the highway, Anton, who lives in a nearby disabled dwelling, often watches them secretly. One day Katja is found murdered on the edge of the highway. She is another victim of a series of enigmatic murders of prostitutes. This time the crime of violence is the responsibility of the highway commissioners Stolte and Gerkhan. At the same time, the truck driver Werner Ricks puts pressure on his boss, Mr Prott, after discovering that he has been transporting hot goods for Prott for years. A little later, Ricks is also found dead. Frank and Semir can not establish any connection between the two cases. Only when Rick's truck finds bloodstains of the murdered Hungarian, and when witnessing Katja's close connection with Anton, is the Commissioners suspected. In fact, on the basis of further testimonies and the criminal investigation, it can be shown that Ricks was the prosecuted murderer. But Anton, too, seems to have played a weighty but still unclear role in the case. Frank and Semir finally discover the dweller on the fair, to which he had often gone with Katja. Anton escaped to the policeman in a ferris wheel gondola. Frank jumps up at the last moment and, helplessly hanging from the gondola, is torn at 20 meters height. With his last strength the policeman can bring in security and Anton move to confession.
5	5	"Death at 100 km7h"	Peter Vogel	Dirk Külov	April 9, 1996
The lawyer Sawatzki pops at a speed of 100 on the highway frontally with a small car. Both drivers are immediately dead. The investigation reveals that Sawatzki was under shock at the time of the accident. As it turns out, the attorney suffered from a strong spiderang. In the car, the investigators find a rare giant spider. Stolte and Gerkhan investigate whether they are dealing with murder.
6	6	"The Old & The Young"	Peter Vogel	Hubert Skloud	April 16, 1996
Commissioners Stolte and Gerkhan are following two gangsters. They have attacked a highway crash and are now escaped with the little Sven as hostage. The parents of the child are completely desperate, because Sven is in a double life: he is a diabetic.
7	7	"Report This Blue Light"	Peter Vogel	Clemens Berger	April 23, 1996
A series of robbery on the highway puts Stolte and Gerkhan on alert: the gangsters always follow the same scheme. They drive wagons with false blue light and give themselves as policemen to rob the car drivers. A discarded handbag with the fingerprints of an old acquaintance puts Stolte and Gerkhan on the trail of the perpetrators: Charly Pirnau and his accomplices Wehner. Frank and Semir are convinced that the gangster duo has rear men. To approach these, the two Commissioners Pirnau will not yet arrest him. He suspects that the police are on his heels, and puts his girlfriend Nina Lobel on Semir Gerkhan. Although he knows that she is an informer, Semir falls in love with Nina. He tries to persuade her to work with the police. Katharina Lamprecht loses patience and orders Frank Stolte to arrest Pirnau. Shortly before the handcuffs snap, Stolte is crushed by Wehner.
8	8	"The Samurai"	Peter Vogel	Clemens Berger	April 30, 1996
The unscrupulous university professor Wilke has used the young pair Yoko and Lukas for his drug experiments abused. Now his handler Rainer Bär is to get rid of the two. He stows the unconscious young people in his car. On the way Lukas comes to himself and tries in vain to wake the dying Yoko. He provoked an accident. Luke escaped with his friend in the arms. A farmer discovers him and calls the ambulance, but for Yoko, any help comes too late: she dies while Lukas is admitted to the hospital. In his blood, doctors find an unknown substance that dissolves after a while. You are tapping illegal drug trials, because the mysterious substance can also be detected in the body of Yoko. Commissioners Stolte and Gerkhan find out that the 18-year-old Yoko is the daughter of a financial manager, who was at home. She and Luke love each other for a long time, but Yoko's father was against their marriage, because his daughter was already promised to one of his friends Sakyo Takeda. Wilke wants to get rid of his fellow-creator. He places Bear, after he has put him out of action, at the wheel of his car and ignites him. When the car is discovered, Stolte and Gerkhan can relate to the death of Yoko due to some paper remnants and medicines. Takeda, Yoko's fiancée, has meanwhile equipped himself on his own to a revenge campaign. He looks up Luke's mother and forces her to betray him where her son is. Frank can just prevent an attack on Lukas. The analysis of the traces found in the charred carriages leads the investigators to the track of Wilke. But Takeda is the professor on the heels.
9	9	"Terminus for All"	Peter Vogel	Clemens Berger	May 7, 1996
The cocaine-dependent Steffi is in trouble: she owes her dealer a lot of money and is expecting a new drug delivery soon. In her hopeless situation, she falls over a bank, shoots the guard and fleees. She meets her contactman Sascha on a highway crash. He soon realizes that something has gone wrong: more and more police officers are coming to the grounds and are obviously looking for Steffi. Sasha panicked and dragged the girl into a busy bus. He hopes to be able to flee unrecognized with the travel group. However, Semir Gerkhan has observed the two from Mareike's restaurant and identified Steffi as the bank robber. He gives himself up as a passenger and also gets on the bus. Sascha smells the roast and takes all the inmates as hostages. Steffi must go reluctantly. Semir is tied up. The crowded bus leaves the service area. Sascha takes the bus to a holding bay to which he has directed his accomplices by mobile phone. There he wants to get out with the other hostages. The deception succeeds, but at the last moment Semir can free himself from his fetters. Sascha shoots at Steffi before he can be put by Semir. The injured girl drags herself behind the wheel of the bus and races back onto the highway. But she is not alone - a little boy has been hiding under the seats and is now coming out. Steffi, who was raised, collapsed faintly over the steering wheel. The bus lurches over the highway and threatened to rage against a bridge abutment.
