= Alarm für Cobra 11 – Die Autobahnpolizei season 8 =

German police television drama

Alarm für Cobra 11 – Die Autobahnpolizei
- Season 8
- No. of episodes: 14

Release
- Original network: RTL Television
- Original release: September 5, 2002 – April 10, 2003

Season chronology
- ← Previous; 7 Next → 9

The eighth season of German television series Alarm für Cobra 11 – Die Autobahnpolizei aired between September 5, 2002, and April 10, 2003. It follows a two-man team of Autobahnpolizei (highway police) in the area of Cologne in North Rhine-Westphalia.

== Cast ==
- René Steinke as Tom Kranich
- Erdoğan Atalay as Semir Gerkhan

Steinke departed the cast after the end of the season.

== Episodes ==
No. overall	No. in season	Title	Directed by	Written by	Original release date
84	1	"Drive"	Raoul W. Heimrich	Ralf Ruland	September 5, 2002
Tom and Semir learn that there will be illegal weapons transported on the highway. They identify the truck but the driver refuses to stop and a chase ensues. Tom and Semir manage to seize the weapons, and arms dealer Lea van Kerkhoven is furious when she hears that the duo have ruined her plans for a third time. She devises a plan to get rid of them.
85	2	"Deadly Arts"	Sebastian Vigg	Jeanette Pfitzer & Frank Koopmann	September 12, 2002
A truck transporting valuable artwork is stopped and brutally robbed on the highway; only the works of a certain painter are stolen. Dr. Weber, the manager of the museum which was to receive the paintings, has received a ransom demand for the safe return of the paintings. The police set an ambush at the exchange, but the gangsters have anticipated this.
86	3	"In the Crossfier"	Axel Barth	Markus Müller	September 19, 2002
Adam Vladek blackmails his former boss, Ernst Wagner, with photographs showing him to be a murderer. Wagner's son, Johannes, pays Vladek for the photos in an exchange along the highway. However, Johannes then murders Vladek and flees; Tom and Semir are nearby and chase him, and Johannes dies in a collision. In revenge, Wagner orders his men to kill the two highway policemen.
87	4	"Helpless"	Carmen Kurz	Nick Ickx & Stefan Sasse	September 29, 2002
Blind opera-star Maria Struck is kidnapped by the Kaschke brothers. She manages to escape, runs through a forest and onto the highway, where she causes an accident involving Tom and Semir. They care for Maria while searching for the kidnappers, who continue to threaten Maria for money.
88	5	"To the Bitter End"	Carmen Kurz	Lorenz Stassen	October 10, 2002
Tom and Semir receive a call that a murder has occurred at a parking place along the highway. They chase and arrest Rudolf Behrmann, who they witnessed walk away from the body. At the police station, Behrmann says he was set up. He gets his hands on a pistol and holds Andrea, Bonrath and Herzberger at gunpoint, demanding that Tom and Semir prove his innocence.
89	6	"The Perfect Murder"	Sebastian Vigg	Elke Schilling	October 17, 2002
Tom and Semir encounter a car with a breakdown on the highway. Semir wants to wait for the ADAC (German Automobile Club) to arrive so that he can spend more time with attractive driver Meike Moritz, but Tom doesn't want that and they leave her alone. Shortly afterwards, Meike is murdered where they left her; Tom blames himself and wants to catch the murderer at any cost.
90	7	"Father and Son"	Holger Gimpel	Andreas Schmitz & Andreas Heckmann	October 24, 2002
Bonrath's son Jochen steals a car to impress his girlfriend. While fiddling with the CD player they collide with another car and flee on foot, taking the CD with them. The CD contains a hacking tool to access computer systems, and its owner, Dr. Schmidt, wants it back at any cost.
91	8	"The Group"	Holger Gimpel	Stefan Dauck & Christian Heider	October 31, 2002
A young man named Sven crashes and dies during a race on the highway. An investigation reveals that Sven's car had been shot with a firearm, and Tom and Semir track down the group of highway racers. They discover that the group's leader, Daniel, caused an accident a few years ago which killed a man and partially paralyzed a woman. Sven had testified in Daniel's trial, leading to a not guilty verdict, and the father of the woman swore revenge. The police consider if the father is a suspect and whether Daniel and another witness may be his next targets.
92	9	"Late Revenge"	Raoul W. Heimrich	Andreas Schmitz & Andreas Heckmann	November 7, 2002
Stefan Hausmann is driving on the highway when he receives a mysterious phone call saying that he should tell the truth, though he doesn't understand. Shortly afterwards, Hausmann dies in a collision with a truck. Anna Engelhardt then receives a call from Erik Dekker who claims that he murdered Hausmann. Dekker wants revenge against those who put him in prison, from which he was just released, for a crime he says he did not commit.
93	10	"Death of a Reporter"	Carmen Kurz	Stefan Dauck & Christian Heider	March 13, 2003
On a parking place near the highway, boss Engelhardt runs into reporter Armin Dahlen, who offers him to bring him to the hospital. While they are driving to the hospital, Dahlen is fatally shot by two men in another car. Tom and Semir discover that Dahlen was preparing an investigation which would expose criminal activity, but they don't know what it was about.
94	11	"A Tough Case"	Holger Gimpel	Andreas Schmitz & Andreas Heckmann	March 20, 2003
Dangerous distracted driver Werner Freese causes a fatal collision but doesn't notice and fails to stop. While searching for Werner, Tom and Semir meet his wife, Isabelle, who had a past relationship with Tom. Werner arrives and denies having anything to do with the accident, but fresh scratches on his car suggest otherwise. Werner concludes that Isabelle is having an affair with Tom and that they are framing him. Werner reacts with increasing violence toward those who try to put him in jail.
95	12	"Betrayed and Sold"	Sebastian Vigg	Stefan Dauck & Christian Heider	March 27, 2003
A courier is robbed and murdered at a parking place along the highway. The robber took a bracelet which Anja Siedel had sent as evidence to exonerate her father, who had been found guilty for her mother's murder. Tom and Semir find no leads in their investigation, but as they return to talk to Anja they notice her driving away with a bomb under her car.
96	13	"Shadows of the Past"	Carmen Kurz	Uli Tobinsky	April 3, 2003
A truck crashes on the highway, and its trailer with a cargo of videocassette recorders is taken away by a truck from the same company. As the collision is investigated, it is suspected that drugs were being smuggled. Elena Krüger, the manager of the transport company, comes to the police station to answer questions. She makes a connection with Tom, who had been told by a fortune teller that he would soon meet the love of his life.
97	14	"Resignation"	Carmen Kurz	Andreas Schmitz & Andreas Heckmann	April 10, 2003
Tom is happy in his relationship with Elena Krüger, who tells him that she's pregnant. He and Semir investigate the robbery and murder of a drug transporter on the highway, which looks to be the work of Leon Zürs – except that they'd seen him die in a car explosion. They have to determine if Zürs survived and who is responsible for the recent murder.
