= Alarm für Cobra 11 – Die Autobahnpolizei season 2 =

German police television drama

Alarm für Cobra 11 – Die Autobahnpolizei
- Season 2
- No. of episodes: 6

Release
- Original network: RTL Television
- Original release: 11 March – 15 April 1997

Season chronology
- ← Previous; 1 Next → 3

The second season of Alarm for Cobra 11 – The Highway Police aired between 11 March and 15 April 1997.

== Format ==
Mark Keller as André Fux replaced Johannes Brandrup and Almut Eggert was demoted to recurring cast member. She departed the series after the season finale.

== Cast ==
=== Main ===
- Mark Keller - André Fux
- Erdoğan Atalay - Semir Gerkhan

=== Recurring ===
- Almut Eggert - Katharina Lamprecht (Entire season)

== Episodes ==
No. overall	No. in season	Title	Directed by	Written by	Original release date
10	1	"Shotgun"	Peter Vogel	Mathias Herbert	11 March 1997
Sports cars driving on the highway are shot at from a Corvette. During the fifth attack, a driver is killed. Semir and his new colleague André Fux believe the attack to be a prank gone wrong. The Corvette driver's arrest leads to a twist in the case.
11	2	"Exposed"	Peter Vogel	Mathias Herbert	18 March 1997
A married couple is involved in a highway accident. Shortly after, an abandoned baby is discovered in a roadside restaurant. Initially, Semir and André see no connection between the cases, but soon discover the couple were on the way to collect the baby, for whom they'd paid a significant sum. Who is the real mother?
12	3	"In Cold Blood"	Peter Vogel	K.M. Majewski	25 March 1997
The family of a diamond dealer is taken hostage. The kidnappers demand diamonds in exchange for release. André and Semir pursue the kidnappers following a failed rescue.
13	4	"Emergency Landing"	Pete Ariel	Clementina Hegewisch & Fritz Müller-Scherz	1 April 1997
An airplane makes a forced landing on the highway after the pilot, an important businessman, is shot by a hidden sniper. André and Semir have no idea who the offender is: the family of an employee who had been fired by the businessman, the husband of the woman whom the businessman had slept with, or a business rival? A document reveals the offender's identity to André and Semir, but their quarry escapes.
14	5	"The Assassination"	Gabriele Heberling	Dieter Tarnowsky	8 April 1997
An African presidential candidate comes to Germany and wants to go for a drive on the highway. The BKA fears that an attempt will be made on his life. André and Semir's task is to prevent this. However, to fulfill this task they must risk their own lives.
15	6	"The Lost Daughter"	Robert Sigl	Renate Kampmann	15 April 1997
A highway accident occurs and a female is found murdered near the wreck. Her family claims she ran away, but the motive is unknown. The family's second daughter soon runs away also. While her father carries out a search, André learns the father has sexually abused her.
