= Alarm für Cobra 11 – Die Autobahnpolizei season 3 =

German police television drama

Alarm für Cobra 11 – Die Autobahnpolizei
- Season 3
- No. of episodes: 16

Release
- Original network: RTL Television
- Original release: October 14, 1997 – June 18, 1998

Season chronology
- ← Previous; 2 Next → 4

The third season of Alarm für Cobra 11 – Die Autobahnpolizei aired between October 14, 1997. and June 18, 1998.

== Format ==
This season was first to be broadcast as full season

== Cast ==
- Mark Keller - André Fux
- Erdoğan Atalay - Semir Gerkhan

== Episodes ==
No. overall	No. in season	Title	Directed by	Written by	Original release date
16	1	"Crash"	Gabriele Heberling	Norbert Eberlein	October 14, 1997
Andre and Semir are on the trail of a gang of Crash-Kids. The bored young people from a rich house organize nightbreak nightly ghost trips. Before the police can grab the gang, an accident occurs, two people die. Meanwhile, the highway guard has been given a new boss: Anna Engelhart is hard, but fair and she stands 100% behind her men.
17	2	"Rehearsal"	Cornelia Dorn von Rossum	David Simmons	October 21, 1997
There are mass accidents on the motorway. Andre and Semir find out that a group of motorcyclists are responsible for it. However, you can not prove anything to the gang. The next night, one of the bikers will be shot. The police learn that the incidents were a sort of rehearsal for a very different project.
18	3	"Childcare"	Gabriele Heberling	Matthias Herbert	October 28, 1997
Andre finds out that his ex-girlfriend is again a new relationship. Your new friend Sam is supposed to be a drug addict. Andre warns Sonya, who does not listen to him, but informs Sam about Andres's investigation. Before Andre and Semir can do anything, they are polled back by their boss. Sam is an undercover agent. The policemen endanger his life through their investigations.
19	4	"Brake Failure"	Pete Ariel	Matthias Herbert	November 11, 1997
Once again, there was a murder in Vietnamese cigarettes dealers in Berlin. The two Vietnamese brothers, Phong La and Pnom Pen, who watched the murder, want to get out of the scene and turn to the authorities. The responsible prosecutor Dr. Midding has the two witnesses held in a supposedly safe place. But then one of the two brothers, Pnom Pen, is lured out of the house by a pretext and killed by a hired killer. In an attempt to rescue the corpse, the killer falls into a mass carambola on the highway. In extreme panic, the killer puts the dead Pnom Pen on the driver's seat and sets the car on fire to blur its tracks. Then he fled on foot. Nevertheless, shortly afterwards arriving policeman André and Semir find out that the man was shot on the driver's seat. They take the investigation and inform the prosecutor that one of his two witnesses has been killed. Obviously there is a leak within the authority. André and Semir do not know that the Vietnamese translator of the prosecutor plays a double game and that the life of Phong La and his wife Li is also highly endangered.
20	5	"Revenge is sweet"	Pete Ariel	Matthias Herrmann	November 18, 1997
Lennart Nielsen, a dismissed convict, wants to take revenge on the head of André and Semir, who had once brought him to prison. Lennart begins terrorizing Anna with phone calls, manipulates her car and threatens her. However, he is so clever that she does not have a handle on Anna near despair. But Lennart is not satisfied with this. With an ingenious plan, he succeeds in discrediting Anna with her superiors as the spy of a drug-giver, and even killing her. Confronted with the murder suspicion, Anna remains no choice: she fled with André and Semir's help and dived. But Nielsen senses her and puts her in his power to complete his revenge. He begins to stage Anna's suicide. It was only at the last moment that André and Semir managed to overwhelm Lennart Nielsen, and to save their boss.
21	6	"Crusader"	Cornelia Dorhn	Matthias Herbert	December 2, 1997
A gang of Romanian burglars has gathered near the highway in the forest and carries out robberies in a very medieval manner: They steal heavy construction machines, break into savings banks and post offices and haul out complete safes. André and Semir investigate the case of a stolen bulldozer. The caterpillar was used for burglary into a post-branch. On the day of the burglary, there was an unusually large amount of money in the vault of the store. The investigators suspect that someone from the branch of the gang must have given a tip. They come to the track of a shady post-Müller customer, who, as it turns out, is a former employee of the Romanian secret service. When a low-loader is stolen on the brighter day with an excavator near the rest area, André and Semir run after the thieves. It comes to a wild chase.
22	7	"Children of Sun"	Dror Zahavi	Matthias Herbert	March 31, 1998
Andrea, the secretary of the highway guard, and Semir go to work. On the radio, they hear the news that members of a sect called the sun children were found dead in Australia and India. Obviously, the followers of the cult, who believe in the imminent overthrowing of the world, were killed at 12.00 local time. Andrea gets a huge fright, because her sister Katrin belongs also to the sect. This makes her unaware for a moment and is involved in a dangerous car accident. Fortunately, both remain uninjured. Together with Semir, Andrea visits her sister at the Sequoia's local headquarters, but she interferes with any interruption to her life. Unrepared things have to take off Semir and Andrea again. Semir makes Andrea realize that they can not do anything of their own accord in the present situation. Andrea does not want to accept this. She tries to break into the sect headquarters and kidnap her sister. It is discovered and captured by the followers of the cult. The sect is just breaking off their tents to move to a remote warehouse, where everything is prepared for collective suicide. Semir and André learn what Andrea had before, but come with a special mission too late: the sect has already cleared their quarters. A feverish search begins, because it already is almost 12:00.
23	8	"Deadly Fame"	Hans Schönherr	Kai Hensel	April 7, 1998
Highway policeman André Fux gets a shocking news: his old friend H.P. Baxxter, the singer of the techno-band Scooter, has been kidnapped. The unknown offenders demand a considerable ransom. André and Semir take the case and hand over the ransom. But there is something wrong with this: two of the three hijackers can be caught, but the drug addict leader of the gangster can escape along with his hostage. In his hiding place, he hurtfully hurt HP for the unsuccessful release of ransoms and began to systematically meld the grounds around his refuge. HP threatens to bleed if he does not get help soon. But the police have difficulty finding the hiding place. When the investigators finally found the right track and penetrate on the railing, preparing them the mad kidnapper a flaming reception.
24	9	"Volley Stop"	Pete Ariel	Matthias Herbert	April 16, 1998
The 18-year-old professional tennis player Bettina Fürst has had the constant paternalism of her authoritarian father. She snaps out of the vault of her father two million and cuts off in her Porsche. On the road, she is building a serious accident that transforms the sports car into scrap. The injured Bettina fled with the money from the scene of the accident. What she does not know is that they are not part of their prize money, but belong to the gangster Seibel, who had arranged with her father a crooked money laundering deal. Seibel puts Prince under pressure: If he does not recover the money until the evening, he will kill him. Meanwhile André and Semir investigate the accident. They quickly find out that the Porsche belongs to Bettina Fürst. Bettina's father holds herself covered by the police, however, and says nothing about the disappeared money. Andrés and Semir's investigations in the tennis circus take her to the track of Bettina's friend Ralf, with whom she also finds the tennis player. The policemen bring Bettina and Roland to interrogation on the guard, where Bettina's father soon appears. In a private conversation Prince of his daughter tells who the money belonged. She is deeply shocked and promises to help him. Together they leave the guard to fetch the money that Bettina has hidden in an old house and thus fulfill Seibel's demand. Unfortunately, the money is no longer where Bettina hid it.
25	10	"Short Rest"	Arend Aghte	Matthias Herbert	April 23, 1998
Four brothers attack a bank spectacularly. On the run from the police, they have an autopanne at the service station, where the highly pregnant Jeanette works. Since the police are directly on their heels, the bank robbers flee with their prey to the service area and take numerous hostages, including Jeanette and Anna Engelhardt. André, who was on the toilet while he was being kidnapped, can be hid. While the leader of the gangster, Josef, is outside the rest area and is preparing the liberation of his brothers, André tries to contact Semir, who is looking for a way to free the hostages. Meanwhile, the situation in the service area is becoming precarious: the brothers surrounded by the police are getting more and more nervous, a lawyer who is one of the hostages, tries to interfere with the negotiations between the arresters and the police, and Jeanette gets premature labor Is released from her child in the resting place under adverse circumstances. Meanwhile, Semir has learned that the leader of the gangster is not in the service area. But before he can get hold of Joseph, he has a helicopter in his power, with whose help he wants to free his brothers. Without hesitation Semir jumps to the skids of the helicopter.
26	11	"Carcass"	Helmut Metzger	Mike Scheffner	April 30, 1998
Semir's cousin Hassan is already a multiple-convicted Hallodri. Currently, he is employed as a barman of a brothel. For lack of money, he lets himself be involved in an insurance fraud. He fetches the car of a man who wants to report the car as stolen to make the vehicle disappear. But the allegedly well thought-out plan goes wrong: Hassan notes already after a few meters that he is pursued by the police. Semir and André are among the prosecutors. Hassan sank the car in a lake and successfully sought his salvation in flight. The police leave the vehicle out of the lake and find in the trunk the dead car owner, a gold acquirer known to the police. The police sent Hassan out to investigate for murder. Semir does not believe that his cousin is a murderer and therefore comes into conflict with André, who considers Hassan guilty. Hassan hides in the meantime with his boss, the Bordellbesitzer Freytag. What he does not know: Freytag is the murderer of the gold collector. Freytag suggested a lucrative business to the victim, then killed him and took him a million cash. Hassan was to be the scapegoat for the deed. But through Hassan's flight Freytag has to change his original plan. He decides to kill his annoying barman. Will Semir and André Hassan be able to save?
27	12	"Poison"	Hans Schönherr	David Simmons	May 7, 1998
A madman poisons on the resting place car drivers with a self-brewed cocktail from sleeping. The poisoned drivers then build numerous accidents. André and Semir try to stop the madman. But then André is also a victim of the poison.
28	13	"Between the Lines"	Pete Ariel	Jochen Wermann	May 14, 1998
Jörg, a minor, is a member of a gang of street kids who are clad with a group of rockers. The kids would only like to take over the area of rockers for drug trafficking. But the rockers do not want to be pushed out of the business by the naughty guys and answer with brutal force: One of the rocker, Atze, stabs Jörg's best friend Danny just before Jeanette's resting place. Danny dies in Jörg's arms. André and Semir take the case, but strike a wall of silence. Both the street kids and the rockers make no statements. Jörg also kept his mouth shut during the interrogation by the policemen. He only thinks of revenge for his dead friend. Soon afterwards he gets the opportunity to satisfy his Rachedurst. With a grenade, he blows the meeting point of the rocker band into the air. With the help of Joerg's sister Katja André and Semir try to get Jörg out of the devil's circle of violence and counter-violence. But the transition will not Jörg let go and also offers him the opportunity to Danny's death to avenge formally: The street boys have brought Atze into their hands.
29	14	"Bargain hunters"	Helmut Metzger	Hans Gerd Müller	May 28, 1998
In a truck accident on the highway the driver of the truck is killed. In the investigations, Semir and André discover that the vehicle has been manipulated. The investigators do not know at first that the accident is the last one in a series of accidents that have been caused by Lutz Heitkamp, the commander of the disaster, and the bordon owner Jürgen Henze. Heitkamp, usually responsible for the handling of insurance claims, and Henze bribe truck drivers to manipulate their vehicles so that a small accident occurs. Heitkamp declares the respectively loaded goods as total damages, which Henze subsequently bought up and stigmatizes in its cheap markets. But this time something went wrong: the trucker committed a driving error and was killed. And something else hurts the business of Heitkamp and Henze, which has so far worked so smoothly: the truck driver Manni, who has learned of the bustle of the two gangs and wants to have a piece of the big cake. Manni has no idea of the danger he thereby brings.
30	15	"Rotten Apples"	Arend Aghte	Mike Scheffner	June 4, 1998
On the highway a fruit transporter accidentally. The driver is killed in the accident. The police find another corpse on the loading platform. Semir gets a huge fright at the sight of the dead: it is his old friend Thomas Born. Born was an official at the Federal Border Guard. Thomas and Semir had divided themselves because of Thomas's later wife Daniela. The investigation revealed that Thomas was not murdered on board the truck, but was already dead. The driver of the car turns out to be a perpetrator. At Semir's surprise, he learns from Thomas's office that his former buddy had been out of service for several weeks. Daniela, who visits Semir on the guard and asks him to clarify the death of her husband, disputes this vehemently. Thomas was definitely on duty. André and Semir are suspected that Thomas was an undercover agent and the dismissal from the service was just a feint. When the two highway policemen speak with Thomas's chiefs, they express themselves around a clear statement. Traces of blood on the truck lead the investigators to a resting place, where two other bodies are found in the shrubbery. The dead are two convicted crooks, one of them was a drug narcotic. However, the weapon with which the two men and Thomas Born were killed is not discovered. So there must be a fourth deceased who managed the body of Thomas Born on the fruit transporter. Semir meets Daniela again, who gives him a clue to a certain person with whom her husband has often met. But Semir's attempt to hear Meer failed: the man is abducted by the unknown before Semir's nose. Meanwhile André has bad news for Semir: Thomas Born was not in an undercover mission, but had to leave the service silently and secretly, because corruption was proven to him. He also wanted to move to Mexico. Semir can hardly believe his old friend had a mess. But this message is not the last unpleasant surprise for Semir.
31	16	"Beat It!"	Pete Ariel	Matthias Herbert	June 18, 1998
In training in his karate club André is surprisingly attacked by a student. Although André only defends himself easily, Olaf dies. Thereupon Commissioner Kindermann accused André of manslaughter, and the commissary of the motorway was suspended. However, Semir holds to his colleague - with the help of a friend of his own, he finds out that Olaf must have died of an undetectable doping agent. No accident - the murder is a revenge of Unger, whom André once took to jail. He manages to André to administer the funds, which then become more aggressive will.
