= Alarm für Cobra 11 – Die Autobahnpolizei season 4 =

German police television drama

Alarm für Cobra 11 – Die Autobahnpolizei
- Season 4
- No. of episodes: 16

Release
- Original network: RTL Television
- Original release: October 1, 1998 – May 6, 1999

Season chronology
- ← Previous; 3 Next → 5

The fourth season of German television series Alarm für Cobra 11 – Die Autobahnpolizei aired between October 1, 1998, and May 6, 1999. It follows a two-man team of Autobahnpolizei (highway police) in the area of Berlin.

== Cast ==
- Mark Keller as André Fux
- Erdoğan Atalay as Semir Gerkhan

Mark Keller departed the cast after the season finale.

== Episodes ==
No. overall	No. in season	Title	Directed by	Written by	Original release date
32	1	"A Leopard Runs Amok"	Helmut Metzger	Andreas Föhr & Thomas Letocha	October 1, 1998
A tank is stolen from a barracks, and driven over everything that is in its way. André and Semir think that they know who the driver is, and where the tank is going: the driver wants to break into a prison and get the prisoner who killed his daughter. André and Semir have to find a way to stop the tank.
33	2	"The Last Chance"	Helmut Metzger	David Simmons & Matthias Herbert	October 8, 1998
Stunt driver Frank Zimmer was injured in a spectacular stunt, and needs an expensive operation in America. To pay for it, he becomes a getaway driver for bank robbers. Zimmer evades pursuit by André and Semir, but runs into trouble with the bank robbers when he tries to keep all of the money for himself.
34	3	"Deadly Sand"	Christoph Eichhorn	Birgit Grosz	October 15, 1998
André and Semir signal a van to stop but it is full of illegal construction-workers and the driver refuses. There is a chase and the van causes a collision, with the driver and workers fleeing the scene. André and Semir investigate Bartuschak, the leader of a building project, who has something much bigger planned.
35	4	"In The Crosshairs"	Diethard Küster	Raphael Sola-Ferrer	October 22, 1998
While driving, the tyre of André and Semir's car is shot and they have an accident. Not realizing the cause, they inspect the damage and André is shot in the leg. Semir receives a phone call from a kidnapper who has Semir's girlfriend Simone, and demands that he follow instructions. The kidnapper has Semir drive a Volkswagen, not realizing that there is a bomb in the car.
36	5	"Disappeared in the Fog"	Diethard Küster	Iris Anna Otto & Susanne Mischke	October 29, 1998
In a highway collision, a couple's baby disappears. André and Semir receive an anonymous call telling them that another person involved in the collision had been in a clinic for abusing a child. André and Semir arrest him. The mother then receives a phone call demanding 200,000 Deutsche Marks for the baby's return. André and Semir have no idea who the criminal could be.
37	6	"The Hitchhiker"	Oren Schmuckler	Matthias Herbert & David Simmons	November 5, 1998
A murdered man is found in a forest near the highway; according to witnesses, he had been with hitch hiker Anna Terjung just before he was killed. She flees when André and Semir attempt to arrest her, and they discover that she was abused by her father when she was a child, and that she kills men in revenge. André goes to the place where she was abused, where Anna threatens him with a gun.
38	7	"The Dead Witness"	Oren Schmuckler	Benedikt Gollhardt	November 12, 1998
Urban explorers Florian and Olaf climb a high bridge to take pictures. They witness a murder, and the gangsters throw Florian off the bridge to his death. Olaf flees and tells the police, while the gangsters search his house for the camera. André and Semir don't find the camera either, nor any evidence of the alleged murders, and dismiss Olaf's story. Olaf decides to find the gangsters and get proof, putting himself in a dangerous situation.
39	8	"The Joker"	Diethard Küster	Matthias Herbert	November 19, 1998
During a highway chase, a gun is fired at a taxicab, killing its passenger. The assailant is captured and identified as international assassin "Der Joker". Semir goes undercover as the assassin to learn who ordered the killing, but several things go wrong and Semir is put under duress to kill an innocent man.
40	9	"Fuel"	Helmut Metzger	Gerhard Rekel & Alexander Hahn	March 18, 1999
A motorist's car explodes due to a highly volatile substance added to his fuel. André and Semir discover that the filling station he used is being blackmailed. After a failed payout, another car explodes. Surveillance cameras show a jerry can being filled with the fuel for use at a motocross race.
41	10	"Deadly Landing"	Marc Herte	TOPAS Autorenpartnerschaft	March 25, 1999
A truck crashes on the highway and the driver dies. The truck was carrying illegal poisons, and an investigation determines that the chemicals react with each other at a temperature of 60 °C (140 °F), causing them to explode. André and Semir learn that another truck is on the highway with the same cargo, and must find the truck on the hot summer day.
42	11	"Burning Ambition"	Helmut Metzger	Enrico Jakob & Matthias Herbert	April 1, 1999
The body of a murdered prostitute is found in a burned-out truck. Her pimp Willi Schröder was in a quarrel with rival Miss Öhler, and André and Semir suspect this is related to the death. Another of Schröder's prostitutes is found murdered, leading André and Semir to a suspect who may actually be a witness. Meanwhile, Andrea starts her own investigation by going undercover as a prostitute, and falls into the hands of the murderer.
43	12	"Shadow Warrior"	Raoul W. Heimrich	Lorenz Stassen	April 8, 1999
While André is ill, Semir works with Rebecca, a Yakuza and karate specialist. Semir finds a severed hand between the wrecks from a collision, and identifies it as Alexander von Rohloff, who was working with a Japanese firm. His boss Funaki reacts strangely to Semir and Rebecca's questions, and they suspect that Rohloff was blackmailing him. When they leave, a mysterious car follows them.
44	13	"Taxi 541"	Christoph Eichhorn	Matthias Herbert	April 15, 1999
André and Semir's boss, Anna Engelhardt, takes a taxi when her car won't start, and the driver tries to kill her in a deserted place. Anna flees and calls André and Semir; they find the taxi and the body of its licensed driver, who is not the man that attacked Anna. André fixes Anna's car and she is about to start the engine when André notices that the ignition is connected to a bomb.
45	14	"The Judge"	Raoul W. Heimrich	Matthias Herbert	April 22, 1999
During a chase, Anna Engelhardt loses control of her car and drives into a garden, killing a mother and her baby. The father and husband Kemmer wants revenge on Anna, and has her put on trial but the judge finds her not guilty. Kemmer then tries to kill Anna's friend Thomas and his son Jonathan by sabotaging the brakes on their car.
46	15	"The Death of a Boy (Part 1)"	Helmut Metzger	Uli Tobinsky	April 29, 1999
André and Semir witness a gun being fired at a mother and son in their car on the highway. The highway police try to come to their aid but the mother is injured and the son killed. The mother is later murdered while under treatment at hospital. André and Semir discover that her husband is a dangerous criminal who lives on Mallorca, and they go to the Mediterranean island to investigate a possible connection.
47	16	"A Lone Victory (Part 2)"	Helmut Metzger	Uli Tobinsky	May 6, 1999
Following the adventure on Mallorca, André is held prisoner by Berger while Semir tries to find him. André recognizes one of Berger's friends as the highway shooter, and tells Berger, who reacts with shock. André uses the opportunity to escape and rejoin Semir. Together, they try to arrest Berger, chasing him on land and sea. But for André, the chase ends tragically.
