= Paul Renner =

Paul Renner may refer to:

- Paul Renner (type designer) (1878–1956), German typeface designer
- Paul Renner (politician) (born 1967), American politician
- Paul Renner (Alarm für Cobra 11 – Die Autobahnpolizei), fictional character from Alarm for Cobra 11 – The Highway Police
