= Alarm für Cobra 11 – Die Autobahnpolizei season 9 =

German police television drama

Alarm für Cobra 11 – Die Autobahnpolizei
- Season 9
- No. of episodes: 18

Release
- Original network: RTL Television
- Original release: September 11, 2003 – May 13, 2004

Season chronology
- ← Previous; 8 Next → 10

The ninth season of Alarm für Cobra 11 – Die Autobahnpolizei aired between September 11, 2003, and May 13, 2004.

== Format ==
Christian Oliver joins the cast. Niels Kurvin joins the recurring cast as Hartmut Freund. Erdoğan Atalay became the leading actor from this season.

== Cast ==
=== Main ===
- Erdoğan Atalay - Semir Gerkhan
- Christian Oliver - Jan Richter

=== Recurring ===
- Niels Kurvin - Hartmud Freund (Episodes 1, 17–18)

== Episodes ==
No. overall	No. in season	Title	Directed by	Written by	Original release date
98	1	"Baptism of Fire"	Raoul W. Heimrich	Roland Heep & Frank Koopmann	September 11, 2003
Air-freight containers fall out of the sky and land on the highway. A spectacular crash follows. Between the containers also the dead body of a pilot is found. When the containers are on the premises of the police Semir inspects them. Suddenly he is knocked out by a man, who steals the containers. Meanwhile it appeared that the containers were filled with paint, which is used for printing euro-notes and that there must be another container. Semir goes to the spot where this container probably landed. There he sees how gangsters want to take the container. They succeed, but Semir is able to arrest the man who knocked him down earlier. His name: Jan Richter. He just finished police-school and works for the department "Robbery". The murdered pilot was a friend of him and he wants to take revenge on the gangsters by himself. He proposes to help Semir with catching the gangsters, but Semir doesn't want this. But Jan doesn't give up so easily and together they get into many dangerous situations.
99	2	"Wrong Traffic-Lights"	Raoul W. Heimrich	David Simmons	September 18, 2003
On a crossroads near the highway an accident happens. It appears that all the traffic-lights turned green at the same moment. While Jan and Semir are on the scene of the accident, Jan's phone ring. The caller says that he controls the traffic-lights in the whole region and that he caused this accident. He also says where the next accident will occur. Jan and Semir go to this location, but they are too late. Again the caller says where the next accident will happen. It looks like this man has a bone to pick up with Jan, but the latter hasn't got a clue who the caller is. Meanwhile the number of crossroads where the traffic-lights are manipulated is growing.
100	3	"Against the Clock"	Sebastian Vigg	Frank Koopmann & Jeanet Pfitzer	September 18, 2003
On the highway Jan and Semir stop a speeding vehicle. Accidentally, Jan sees that the driver has a gun. At that moment the two men flee. Jan and Semir start a chase. But soon the men get an accident. One of them gets out of the car and puts a bomb in it. Together with his mate the car explodes in front of the eyes of Jan and Semir. In the car they find a lot of parts with which the men wanted to build a big bomb. Soon the traces lead Jan and Semir to a garage, where they find more parts for a bomb. Not much later Jan and Semir get into a precarious situation when it appears that the garage is full of explosive surprises.
101	4	"Family Ties"	Carmen Kurz	Ralf Ruland	September 25, 2003
Two young men, Marc and Ralf, are stopped by Bonrath and Herzberger during a routine check. When Bonrath asks for their papers, the men flee. Bonrath and Herzberger start a chase. Eventually the young men stop at an old factory. Not much later Bonrath and Herzberger arrive. On their way to the entrance Bonrath suddenly sees one of the men, Marc, on the roof. Marc aimes a gun on Herzberger. To protect his colleague Bonrath shoots at Marc. Quickly the officers go to Marc. He is heavily injured. The weapon is gone and Ralf flees. Because the weapon and Ralf are trackless, appearances are against Bonrath: it seems like he shot Marc without a reason. Bonrath is suspended. Jan and Semir believe the story of Bonrath and go all out to prove their colleague's innocence.
102	5	"Deadly Cargo"	Axel Barth	Markus Hoffmann	October 2, 2003
While setting up a radar-control Jan and Semir are almost run over by a stewardess named Monika Schindler. Jan and Semir start a chase, but soon Monika gets into an accident in which she is killed. It appears that Monika was already in a hurry when she left the airport: the customs-officer Bruhns has a security-tape which shows how Monika is leaving a parking-lot with high speed. Later a photo of their own radar control shows Jan and Semir how Monika was chased by pilot Reinders, who flew the plane on which Monika was from South-Africa to Germany. That's the reason why she was in a big hurry. While searching for the answer to the question why Monika was chased by Reinders, Jan and Semir also discover that customs-officer Bruhns has got something to do with this case.
103	6	"The Impact"	Axel Barth	Lorenz Stassen	October 9, 2003
Jan is on his way to work. Near roadworks on the highway he gets involved in an accident. When he gets out of his car he sees what he has caused: he has hit the civil-engineer Wegner and last one died instantly. Jan is suspended. Later Jan and Semir take a look at the building-site, where they talk to a person named Stemmler. He is the safety co-ordinator of the building-company and tells them that Wegner supposed to work on another building-site. Semir gets the suspicion that Wegner was murdered on his own building-site and later was thrown for the car of Jan. But who is the murderer and how can Semir prove his theory?
104	7	"Rock 'n' Roll"	Holger Gimpel	Andreas Heckmann & Andreas Schmitz	October 16, 2003
Rockstar Johnny, singer of the band "Speed", survives an attempt on his live: his car explodes at a parking-place near the highway. Fortunately he is outside his car when the bomb explodes. Jan and Semir get the task to protect Johnny and the other members of the band against possible future attempts. Meanwhile the band has got an inventation to perform at a tv-show. Jan and Semir don't like this idea, but the band doesn't see the possible dangers and so their performance will go on. But during the shootings for the tv-show Jan and Semir suddenly see someone in the audience aim a gun at Johnny.
105	8	"Countdown"	Raoul W. Heimrich	Ingo Regenbogen & Horst Wieschen	October 23, 2003
An anonymous call puts Jan and Semir in high alertness. A man threatens to blow up a tank truck. At the last moment, officials manage to save the driver. Shortly thereafter, the perpetrator reports to Giering. He announces further explosions if his ransom claim is not addressed. Jan and Semir suspect a connection with previous events. At that time one of Giering's lorries had rushed unimpeded into a perennial.
106	9	"The Detective"	Sebastian Vigg	Axel Bär	October 30, 2003
Coincidentally private detective Kai Schröder witnesses a heated conflict between two men. He shoots some photos from the contestants. When the men notice this, they immediately attach themselves to Schroder's heels. While fleeing from his pursuers, the detective caused an accident. Jan and Semir are quickly on the scene. The photos remain in Schroder's possession. Only their development reveals what ardent evidence they have unwittingly held.
107	10	"Sitting Ducks"	Carmen Kurz	Elke Schilling	March 18, 2004
Jan and Semir are chasing a dangerous traffic bug, but the Porsche escapes. The owner of the Porsche, Robert Koch, is quickly determined. When the two policemen show up, they experience a surprise. Cook is tied up in his garage. His Porsche, which he wanted to sell, was stolen by the two men, who turned out to be buyers, along with the papers. Such thefts on advertisement have existed very often in the last two months. A well-organized band must be at work. The Porschediebe are the life-loving Dennis and his best friend Alex, a petite girl who could also go as a boy. They leave the Porsche to a ridicule price Ralle Plischka, the manager of a scrap yard. Afterwards Alex complains about their situation, because the two are forced to the thefts. But Dennis has a mysterious trump in his hand, which could bring them a lot of money, so he believes in any case ... Jan and Semir discover on the monitor video a reflection of Dennis's portrait and establish his identity. When they search his apartment, Dennis emerges surprisingly, but can flee and now demands from rifle land owner Ralle money and curse aid. Ralle refuses. Then Dennis moves out with his trump: he has photos of Ralle together with Karel Marek, Ralles Hintermann, who organizes the car shooters. Ralle gives in front and gives Dennis along with his handler Marco to steal a lotus. Then he would help him disappear. But what Dennis has no idea: The contract is a deadly trap.
108	11	"No Way Out"	Axel Barth	Lorenz Stassen	March 25, 2004
Semir and Jan are on the highway, when they discover a conspicuous vehicle nearby: A two-person car runs snake lines. Semir and Jan want to put the two. It is a wild chase that ends in a spectacular crash. A truck, which has loaded a container, rushes to the accident site. The driver tries to avoid, but too late: the truck and container tipping over. Although the cargo and the vehicle are massively damaged, the chief of the truck driver, an embassy of the Republic of Saint Marco, insists that there is no accident investigation and the freight collected. When the two police officers find a drug pack, they suspect that this is from the container. Jan and Semir, however, are prevented from further investigation by the diplomatic immunity of the wire draftsman and ambassador Bouchard. Of course, the lawmakers continue on their own, and so come to the trail of the wine merchant Reger, who obviously cooperates with the intriguing ambassador. Reger's daughter Katharina, however, turns to help Jan and Semir because she is concerned that her father is involved in criminal activities. Finally, the two policemen discovered burdensome material, with which they could make the diplomats Bouchard dingfest. But it comes different: When Bouchard tries to intimidate the police, this is shot by wine merchant Reger. Although Jan Katharina believes that her father is innocent, a warrant of arrest is issued against the wine merchant Walter Reger, since his entanglement in the case raises too many questions.
109	12	"Heinrich and Paul"	Holger Gimpel	Andreas Heckmann & Andreas Schmitz	April 1, 2004
On the horse run, Heinrich Lisizki, a gentleman of old school and charming slit ears, flirts with the pretty cashier Monika - when suddenly the hell breaks loose: A brutal robbery, ruthlessly executed by the gangster Kalle Zoell. Heinrich shows little impressed by the criminals, provokes Zoell even - which gives a cashier time, the alarm button. Zoell spins through, shoots at the cashier and disappears - without loot! Jan and Semir, who happen to be close by, take up the persecution, but the robbers can escape. Except with rage, Zoell is responsible to the old Henry for the failure of the attack. The investigators question the witnesses of the attack, also cashier Monika, who can not help them. The video surveillance was - strangely - just on this day defective. Heinrich is also questioned - and it turns out that Semir and Heinrich know each other. Because Henry Lisizki is an old ganove, but one with class and the associated honor. Meanwhile, Jan and Semir have discovered a note: The projectile of the weapon, which was shot at the cashier, comes from a rare weapon. So Jan and Semir come to the small arms dealer Louis. In interrogation they succeeded in getting the handynummer of the buyer out of Louis. While Jan and Semir track down the race carriages, Heinrich falls into the hands of his old friend and boyfriend Paul: a schoolboy of old school, as well as Henry. Both remember the great old days, and that brings Heinrich on a daring idea: you are out to show it to the world as again both
110	13	"In the Sight of Death"	Hermann Joha & Carmen Kurz	Markus Hoffmann	April 8, 2004
At the anniversary celebrations for the police president Nolte comes an assassination attempt: Anna Engelhardt gets a stripe, but the policeman, Roth, sitting next to her, kills deadly injured. Jan and Semir accept the persecution of the assassin, but he can escape after a rapid chase. The assassin's ambulance can find the target range of the action weapon and can identify the alleged perpetrator by means of fingerprints. According to this, the criminals are Jansen. For Anna Engelhardt no stranger, for she had once put Jansen behind bars and now believes she was the real target of the attack. When the SEK storms the apartment of Jansen, one finds it only lifeless. One suspects suicide, and thus the case seems to be concluded. But a slump in Roth's house makes the case appear in a different light: Among the investigators, the suspicion that Roth might be involved in corruption in his work in the drug group. Jan, Semir and Engelhardt then investigate Roth. They talk to Oberkommissar Baumann and get to know Roth's partner, Timo Siegel, who is not only suspicious of the burglar, but also seems to be involved in corruption. Jan and Semir travel with Baumann to Siegel's apartment. Too late: seal has already disappeared. For what Jan and Semir could not have guessed so far: Oberkommissar Baumann is also a strong contributor to the illegal business and was able to warn Siegel in time. Anna Engelhardt has reconstructed the event on the anniversary party of police president Nolte once more and she knows: Only Nolte can take her and Roth into the visor of the sniper. When Engelhardt turns her old mentor to Nolte, he is no trouble to deny his guilt. A little later Baumann appears. Engelhardt sits in the trap. She is tied up and taken away by Baumann. They want their death to look like an accident. Jan and Semir have the dirty game now seen through, and try to save colleague.
111	14	"Sabotage"	Holger Gimpel	Ingo Regenbogen & Horst Wieschen	April 8, 2004
Semir is renting a car from the car rental Gerlach. On the highway, the brakes suddenly fail. Semir loses control and is rammed by a heavy truck. He is seriously injured in the hospital and falls into a coma. A little later, the criminal investigation revealed that both the brake hose and the handbrake of the transporter were manipulated. Shocked and motivated to figure out the background of the attack, Jan and Bonrath determine the car rental. From the managing director Beatrice Gerlach the two learn that the company is extorted by an unknown person. Beatrice and her husband Niklas are to pay one million euros, otherwise other rented vehicles would be manipulated. The suspicion first comes to the former Helmer, who was only recently released. Beatrice and her husband decide to surrender the blackmail and pay the money. However, the transfer failed. Soon there will be another incident with a rental car. Jan wonders if Niklas Gerlach could have anything to do with the blackmail because he thinks he is strange. In a conversation with Beatrice, he learns that Niklas had a lover some time ago. In a divorce, he would get nothing, because of the business property is Beatrice
112	15	"The Deathlist"	Holger Gimpel	Ralf Ruland	April 22, 2004
Jan and Semir discover a weapon in an accident participant, the computer hacker, Van Breukelen, and take him into the custody at short notice. In the interrogation, however, he shows little co-operation, and is silent on the question of who is his client. But his loyalty is not rewarded, on the contrary, his client, the gangsterdecker, gets nervous and lets Van Breukelen liquidate. Decker is now looking for a substitute with computer skills similar to Van Breukelen, and he finally finds himself in the hackers' scene: Raphael Münch was already in prison because of hacking, but has abjured the crime because he got the care for his little daughter Natasha want. Decker and his people use a mean trick: they contact Raphael and pretend to be from the LKA. Raphael is to help them decrypt a deciphering program. As a reward, he would help him to get the right to care for his daughter. Raphael enters the deal. However, when he is shadowed by Jan and Semir and comes to the confrontation between the highway policemen and deckers, he suddenly realizes that Decker is a criminal. Raphael refuses to help Decker. But the unscrupulous criminal abducts Raphael's daughter Natasha and her kindergarten and threatens to kill the two. Raphael is in desperation of the deciphering program and Deckers' planned coup can begin. With the help of a fictitious bombing, Decker succeeds in getting his people into the Landeskriminalamt. The squad invades a special computer terminal, which contains a list of the V-people of the LKA. This list is the target of Decker's criminal plans: he wants to sell the list to the underworld. To get to the data he needs a last time Raphael's help
113	16	"Undercover"	Holger Gimpel	Frank Koopmann & Jeanet Pfizer	April 29, 2004
Semir determined in a dangerous mission: He was undercover in a car slide ring. Chief Commissioner Wiemeier from the LKA heads the action. Apart from the LKA, only Jan and Engelhardt know of the assignment. Even Andrea thinks that Semir is participating in a training course in Munich. Semir's task is to get to know the so-called 'Czar', the head of the gang. It is only when the 'Czar' can be connected with the slider ring that the LKA wants to lift the store. It is not easy to get to the boss at all. However, Semir succeeds in arousing the boss's interest. But to prove his loyalty, Semir has to do a task for the 'Tsar': He is to shoot Chief Commissioner Wiemeier! Semir succeeds in warning Jan before the attack. But Jan becomes suspicious. Will the 'Tsar' Wiemeier really just kill him because the LKA is on his heels? Or is there something else behind it? Jan is right with his idea. Wiemeier has an open account with the 'Czar', alias Millberg. Millberg is a former colleague of Wiemeier. When he changed sides a few years ago, he killed Wiemeier's younger brother. And yet, Semir has quite different worries at the moment. Andrea has now found out that Semir is not at all in Munich, but is in the Cologne apartment of an LKA official. She is sure Semir will deceive her. Jealous crosses in the apartment - and so this unveils Semir's camouflage.
114	17	"The Devil's Own"	Carmen Kurz	Elke Schilling	May 6, 2004
Jan and Semir are leading a course for commissioner candidates, but one of the participants, Sandra Strohm, seems less interested in the content than in Jan himself. In the aftermath, however, Jan is confronted with life-threatening accidents: First, the airbag of his car bursts, and Jan causes a mass carambolage, then he gets a packet, in which a dangerous cobra lurks on him. The snake's trail leads to an animal dealer who admits to having illegally sold the cobra to a woman. Her description makes Jan stupid, but his partner is hiding his suspicion and he is talking to Sandra, with whom he had a secret affair. Sandra, however, manages to convince Jan of her innocence. Semir, however, is aware of his partner's entrance to the scene, and he is talking about Jan again. He learns about Jan's relationship with Sandra and her unstable mental condition. The two men notice too late that there is another listener of their conversation: Sandra. A short time later, a burning benzine gun flies through the window. Jan and Semir take the pursuit, but Sandra manages to escape. In the subsequent search of Sandra's apartment, the investigators discover a drug used in psychosis. Sandra's psychiatrist believes in a relapse and considers his patient to be dangerous and unpredictable in this state. Although Jan is then put under police protection, Sandra manages to sneak into Jan's apartment at night and kidnap him. Battle scars in the apartment let fear the worst and the feverish search for Jan and Sandra starts.
115	18	"The Witness"	Holger Gimpel	Jörg Schnitger & Sven Ulrich	May 13, 2004
Ariane Borsche is a witness in a murder case. When she is involved in an accident, Jan and Semir do not yet know that Arianes car was manipulated. Terror shows the effect hoped for by the perpetrator, for the intimidated woman withdraws her testimony. Behind the attack is Roberto Leone, a rich entrepreneur, and as his son Franco seems to be dealing with the murder case, Roberto Leone is every means right to spare his Filius a stay in jail. However, Jan and Semir do not give up so quickly: the police investigation makes Franco nervous, and he decides to silence the Ariane Borsche. After another attack on her life fails, Franco finally loses control, and wants Ariane's little son to tie up.
