= Dieter Dorn =

German theatre director (born 1935)

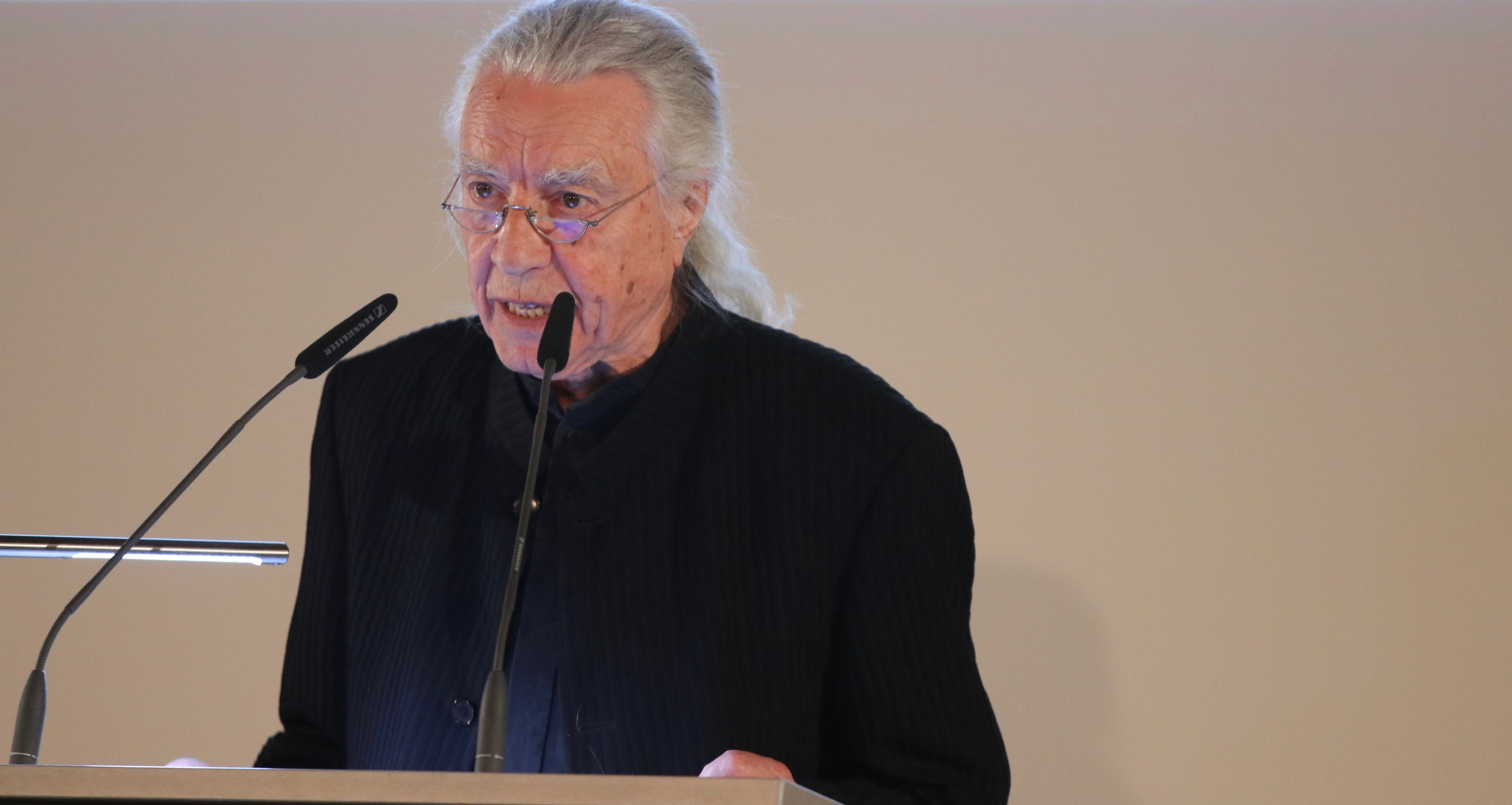
- Born: 31 October 1935 (age 91); Leipzig
- Occupations: Stage director; Theatre director
- Organization: Münchner Kammerspiele

Dieter Dorn (born 31 October 1935 in Leipzig) is a German theatre director, also for the opera, the manager of the Münchner Kammerspiele from 1983 to 2001, then manager of the Bavarian Staatsschauspiel until 2011.

== Career ==
Born in Leipzig on 31 October 1935, Dorn studied at the Theaterhochschule Leipzig. In 1956, he left East Germany and studied at the Max-Reinhardt-Schule für Schauspiel in Berlin with Hilde Körber, the founder of the school, and Lucie Höflich.

He was engaged at the Landesbühne Hannover from 1958 until 1961 as an actor and a dramaturge, then worked as a journalist and radio speaker for the NDR. In 1964, he returned to the theatre at the Landesbühne Hanover, then moved to Essen. In the early 1970s, he staged at the Schauspielhaus Hamburg and at the Schaubühne in Berlin, and as a guest in Oberhausen, Basel, and the Burgtheater in Vienna.

== Münchner Kammerspiele ==
In 1976, Dorn moved to the Münchner Kammerspiele as a senior director, opening with Lessing’s Minna von Barnhelm with Cornelia Froboess in the title role. He concentrated first on other German classical authors such as Goethe and Kleist and then focused on Shakespeare. He staged six plays in collaboration with the literary manager Michael Wachsmann, the theatre's artistic director since 1986, who translated the complete texts: A Midsummer Night's Dream (1978), Twelfth Night (1980), Troilus and Cressida (1986), King Lear (1992), The Tempest (1994), and Cymbeline (1998). The stage sets were by Jürgen Rose who built large empty spaces. One of his protagonists was Rolf Boysen who played Lear, for example. Dorn promoted contemporary theatre, such as world premieres of ten plays of Botho Strauß, in 1988 Besucher (Visitors), in 1991 Schlusschor (Final Chorus), and in 1996 Ithaka, with Bruno Ganz. Dorn had become the theatre's director (Intendant) in 1983.

== Bavarian Staatsschauspiel ==
Since 2001, he has been the director of the Bavarian Staatsschauspiel in the Residenz Theatre and the Cuvilliés Theatre. He continued, together with many members of the Kammerspiele ensemble and the translator, performances of Shakespeare and several more premieres of Botho Strauß. The theater supplies a list of his play productions, staged at the Residenztheater unless otherwise noted.

- Der Kaufmann von Venedig of Shakespeare, protagonists Rolf Boysen and Thomas Holtzmann, 2001
- Der Tag Raum (The Day Room) of Don DeLillo, 2001, Theater im Haus der Kunst
- Der Narr und seine Frau heute abend in Pancomedia of Botho Strauß, 2002
- Die Wände of Jean Genet, 2003
- Maß für Maß of Shakespeare, 2004
- Die eine und die andere of Botho Strauß, world premiere 27 January 2005
- Die Bakchen of Euripides, 2005
- Floh im Ohr of Feydeau, 2006
- Androklus und der Löwe of Shaw, 2006
- Der Gott des Gemetzels of Yasmina Reza, 2008
- Idomeneus of Roland Schimmelpfennig, world premiere 15 June 2008, Cuvilliés Theater
- Das Ende vom Anfang of Seán O'Casey, 2008, Cuvilliés Theater
- LEICHTES SPIEL Neun Personen einer Frau of Botho Strauß, world premiere 2. April 2009
- Alkestis after Euripides of Raoul Schrott, 2009

== Opera productions ==
The first opera staged by Dorn was Mozart's Die Entführung aus dem Serail at the Wiener Staatsoper, conducted by Karl Böhm in 1979. He also staged at the Salzburg Festival Ariadne auf Naxos of Richard Strauss and in 2003 the world premiere of Hans Werner Henze's L'Upupa und der Triumph der Sohnesliebe, conducted by Markus Stenz. The reviewer stated: "The hot ticket at this year’s Salzburg Festival is not one of the three Mozart opera productions, but the world premiere production of Hans Werner Henze’s newest stage-work L’Upupa und der Triumph der Sohnesliebe (The Hoopoe and the Triumph of Filial Love)." and continued: "This action-packed scenario might seem complex, but it emerges in a production of magical simplicity and ravishing visual beauty by the stage director, Dieter Dorn and set and costume designer, Jürgen Rose with a spell-binding clarity. A clarity which Henze also achieves in what must be his richest and most entrancing opera score to date."

At the Ludwigsburger Schlossfestspiele, Dorn directed Mozart's Così fan tutte in 1984 and Le nozze di Figaro in 1987, both conducted by Wolfgang Gönnenwein. At the Bayreuth Festival, he staged Wagner's Der Fliegende Holländer in 1990, and at the Metropolitan Opera in New York City Wagner's Tristan und Isolde in 1999, conducted by James Levine.

The Cuvilliés Theatre was reopened in 2008 with Mozart's Idomeneo, directed by Dorn and conducted by Kent Nagano, sets and costumes by Jürgen Rose, with singers John Mark Ainsley, Juliane Banse and Annette Dasch.

In 2018, Dorn staged Richard Wagners Parsifal, conducted by Sir Simon Rattle, choreography by Martin Gruber.
