= Plötzlich Papa – Einspruch abgelehnt! =

- Starring: René Steinke
- Country of origin: Germany

Plötzlich Papa – Einspruch abgelehnt! is a German television series.

== See also ==
- List of German television series
