= Ithaka (play) =

Play by Botho Strauss

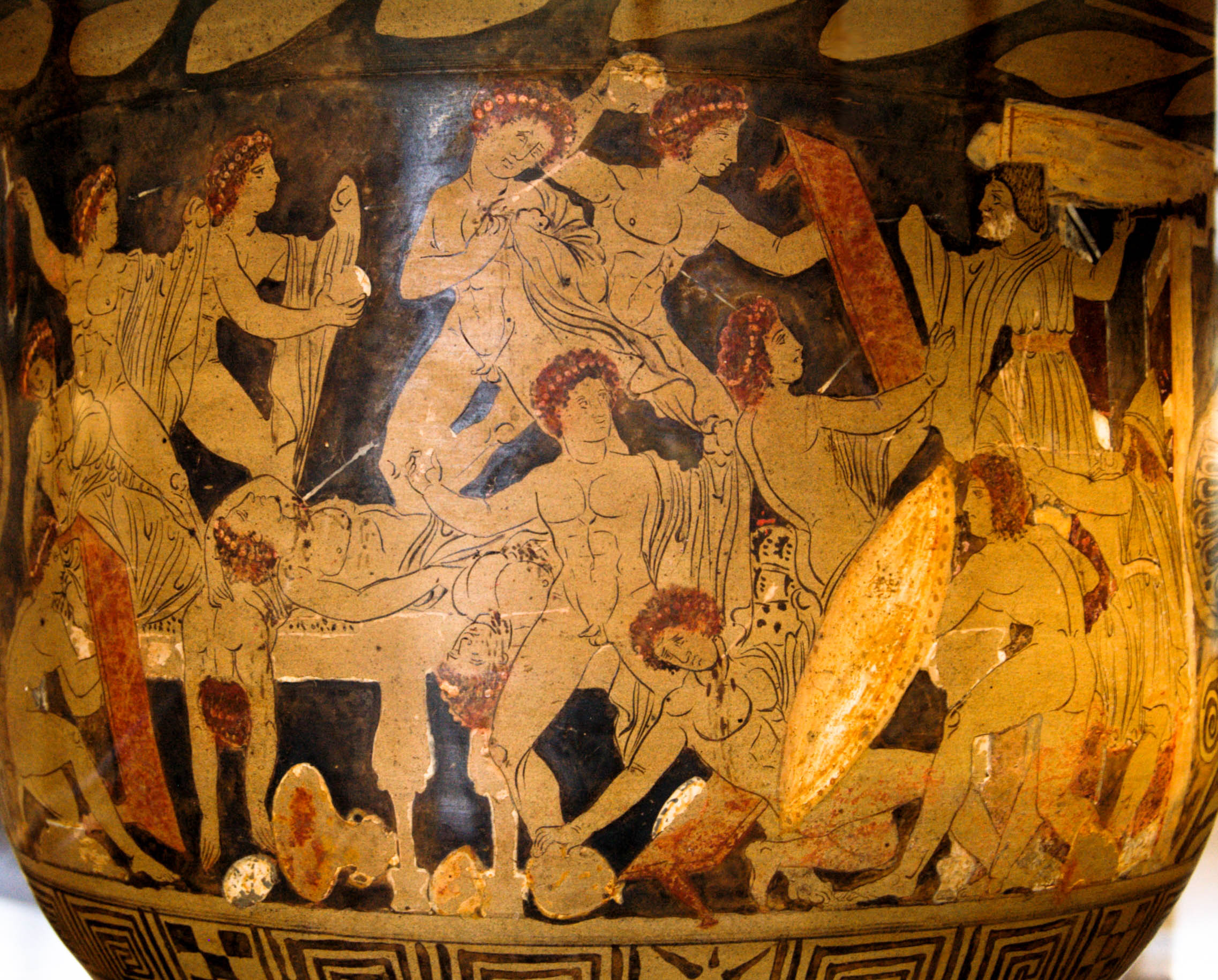
- The slaughter of the suitors on a Campanian red-figure bell-krater, ca. 330 BC
- Original language: German
- Written by: Botho Strauß

Premiere
- Date: 17 July 1996
- Place: Munich Kammerspiele, Munich

Ithaka is a 1996 play by the German writer Botho Strauß. It has the subtitle Schauspiel nach den Heimkehr-Gesängen der Odyssee, meaning "play after the homecoming songs from the Odyssey". It tells the story of how Odysseus, the Greek hero from the Trojan War, returns after 20 years to his court in Ithaca, where he massacres the suitors of his wife Penelope to recreate order.

== Production history ==
The play premiered on 17 July 1996 at the Munich Kammerspiele, directed by Dieter Dorn. It was produced for the Deutsches Theater in Berlin by Thomas Langhoff the following year.

== Reception ==
Several critics, including Wolfgang Höbel of Der Spiegel and Rolf Michaelis of Die Zeit, speculated whether the play was related to a passage from Strauß' heavily debated essay "Anschwellender Bocksgesang", about how "blood sacrifice" is the means by which a nation imposes its moral laws, and whether the play thereby has an anti-democratic message. Roland Koberg of the Berliner Zeitung was skeptical of such an interpretation and wrote that the play easily can be interpreted as a "peace text", as the gods who incite the violence are condemned for it. Höbel, who reviewed the Munich performance, criticized Dorn's portrayal of the suitors in punk rock style, as it did not make them appear as serious threats to "manners, law and state", and made it incomprehensible "why Odysseus specifically has to pierce their chests, instead of simply pulling their ears". Koberg reviewed the Berlin performance, and wrote that Langhoff's version was "somewhat wiser", with the suitors portrayed as a "stylized counter-chorus".
