= Martin Gruber (choreographer) =

German director, choreographer and movement teacher

Martin Gruber (born 1957) is a German director, choreographer and movement teacher for performing artists.

== Education ==
Gruber obtained a degree in Theatre and Music from LMU Munich, a training in Zenbodytherapy® and Triggerpoint Anatomy® with William Dub Leigh (USA), Functional Integration with Alon Talmi (Israel), Suzuki Training with Tadashi Suzuki in Toga-Mura (Japan). Judo, Aikido, Iaido, Hojo in Japan and Germany, 7th Dan in Aikido (Aikikai Hombu Dojo). He studied in Butoh Dance with Kazuo Ono in Japan, and Acting with Yoshi Oida.

== Life ==
Martin Gruber works as a director and a choreographer. He is a professor for movement at the Ernst Busch Academy of Dramatic Arts in Berlin. He has developed his own method of actor training and founded the Talmi Method®, named after Alon Talmi. (Note: see https://www.talmi-methode.com/en/treatment-with-the-talmi-methode/additional-information/) (Note: see http://www.impulstanz.com/en/archive/2006/workshops/id779/)

Martin Gruber's impact on contemporary European actor training is important: In 1985 he introduced Aikido into actor training at the Otto Falckenberg School (Munich), in 1986 Suzuki-Training, (Note: see http://archiv.mimecentrum.de/videos/MCB-SV-1413) and in 1993 August Everding invited him to develop the movement training for the then newly founded Bayerische Theaterakademie August Everding (Munich). Since then quite a number of his students have become teachers themselves and teach his methods both in universities in Germany and further afield. (Note: among them Vera Schlenker, Prof. Daniela Wicaz, Jutta Burger (Hochschule für Schauspielkunst Ernst Busch Berlin), Prof. Carola Grahl (Hochschule für Musik und Darstellende Kunst, Stuttgart), Doris Dexel (Konservatorium Wien, Österreich), Susanne Rebholz (Orff Institut, Universität Mozarteum Salzburg, Austria), Jannis Spengler (Bayerische Theaterakademie München), Prof. Isabel Hindersin, Stefan Lenz (Universität der Künste Berlin).) Many of his former students work successfully on stage, in film and on TV. (Note: for example Jens Harzer, Joachim Meyerhoff, Bettina Mittendorfer, Natali Seelig, Lisa Wagner, André Eisermann, Götz Otto, Birge Schade, Ina Weisse, Francis Fulton-Smith, George Lenz, Rainer Strecker, Oliver Wnuk and more.)

== Publications ==
- 2015 Tongguo chuangzao xingxingwei chaoyue chengshi dadao gexinghua bioada (Ten days with Zhou Xinfang in Shanghai. Afterthoughts), in: Jihua jingju dashi Zhou Xinfang danchen 120 zhounian. Waiguo zhuanjia yanjiu wence (In Memory of the 120th Birthday of the Jingju Maestro Zhou Xinfang. A Collection of Research Papers by Foreign Experts), edited by Zhou Xinfang Arts Research Center: Shanghai 2015, pp. 10–15, with Susanne Goesse.
- 2014 Der Körper in der Darstellenden Kunst - der Neutralkörper, in: Psychologische Medizin. Österreichische Fachzeitschrift für Medizinische Psychologie, Psychotherapie und Psychosomatik, Wien 3/2014, pp. 23–28
- 2010 Formen bilden, Formen vernichten. In: Bernd Stegemann (editor): Lektionen 4: Schauspielen Ausbildung. Theater der Zeit, Berlin 2010, pp. 169–188.
- 2002 Form und Wandlung. Schauspiel als Weg am Beispiel des Aikido und anderen Arten der Körperarbeit. In: Peter Schettgen (editor): Heilen statt Hauen. Aikido-Erweiterungen in Therapie und beruflicher Bildungsarbeit. Augsburg 2002, S. 117–134.
- 2001 Formen bilden, Formen vernichten. Bemerkungen zu neuen Wegen in der Schauspielausbildung. In: Rollenunterricht, Sprecherziehung, Stimmbildung und Körperarbeit in der Ausbildung zum Schauspieler. Dokumentation der Arbeitstagung der Bayerischen Theaterakademie August Everding 27.–30. April 2000. München 2001, pp. 201–215.
- 1999 Grammatik der Füsse und Stimme. In: Integration von Sprecherziehung, Liedgestaltung und Körpertraining in der Ausbildung zum Schauspieler. Dokumentation der Arbeitstagung der Bayerischen Theaterakademie 26.–29. März 1998. München 1999, S. 96–100; with Uwe Hollmach.

=== Symposium contributions and articles as PDF files ===
- Demigod or Servant – On the Vulnerability of the Actor. 2012 (symposium lecture; PDF; 121 kB).
- Abmessen der Handlungsräume. Erste Eindrücke nach dem Besuch der Bauhaus-Bühne. Mapping the Action Spaces. First Impressions After the Visit to the Bauhaus Stage. In: Theater der Zeit. 6/2011. Supplement to Prague Quadrennial 2011: Die Bühne als Raumapparat / The Stage as Space Apparatus, S. 2–3 (online).
- Formen bilden, Formen vernichten. In: Bernd Stegemann (editor): Lektionen 4: Schauspielen Ausbildung. Theater der Zeit, Berlin 2010, S. 169–188. (PDF).
- Form and Change: Acting as Path – based on the Example of Aikido and Other Types of Body Work. 2010 (PDF).
- Go and wash your plate or how to teach Aikido to human resources. 2003 (PDF).

== Literature ==
- Susanne Goesse: Von China nach Japan in zwei Theaterstücken. In: Minima sinica. 1/2006, pp. 48–74.
- Wolfgang Lanzinger: Martin Gruber. Ein Großmeister des Theaters mit einem Hang zum Extravaganten. In: Dorfener Heimatbuch. Von der Stadterhebung bis ins 3. Jahrtausend. Band 1. Dorfen 2006, pp. 460–462.
