= Rainer Strecker =

German actor (born 1965)

Reiner Strecker
- Born: Reiner Strecker; 25 October 1965 (age 59); West Berlin, West Germany
- Occupation(s): Actor, director, voice actor
- Years active: 1985–present

Rainer Strecker (born 25 October 1965) is a German actor. He is best known as the voice of the audiobooks of the Inkheart series by Cornelia Funke.

== Selected filmography ==
Year	Title	Role	Notes
1985	Westler	Thomas	
1988	Linie 1	Kleister	
1996	Alarm für Cobra 11 – Die Autobahnpolizei	Ingo Fischer	TV series, episode 1 and 2
2003	They've Got Knut	Michael	

== Theatre ==
Year	Title	Role	Notes
2016	Keinort.Finsternis	Kleist	Director: Anne Schneider
2015	Die Sterntaler after the story by Brothers Grimm	Various roles	Director: Nina Kupczyk
2008	Tintentod by Cornelia Funke	Orpheus	Director: Heidelinde Leutgöb
1997	Beijing Lan		Director: Martin Gruber (choreographer)
