= René Steinke (actor) =

German actor

René Steinke (born 16 November 1963 as René Dan Steinke in East Berlin, East Germany), is a German actor, best known in Alarm für Cobra 11 – Die Autobahnpolizei as Kriminalhauptkommissar Tom Kranich. He appeared in the role from 1999–2003 and 2005–07. He was paired with Erdoğan Atalay, who played Semir Gerkhan.

== Selected filmography ==
- Interrogating the Witnesses (1987)
- Curse This House (2004, TV film)
- The Cursed Treasure (2006, TV film)
- Hitman Zero (2008, TV film)
- Plötzlich Papa – Einspruch abgelehnt! (2008–2012, TV series)
