= Erdoğan Atalay =

German actor (born 1966)

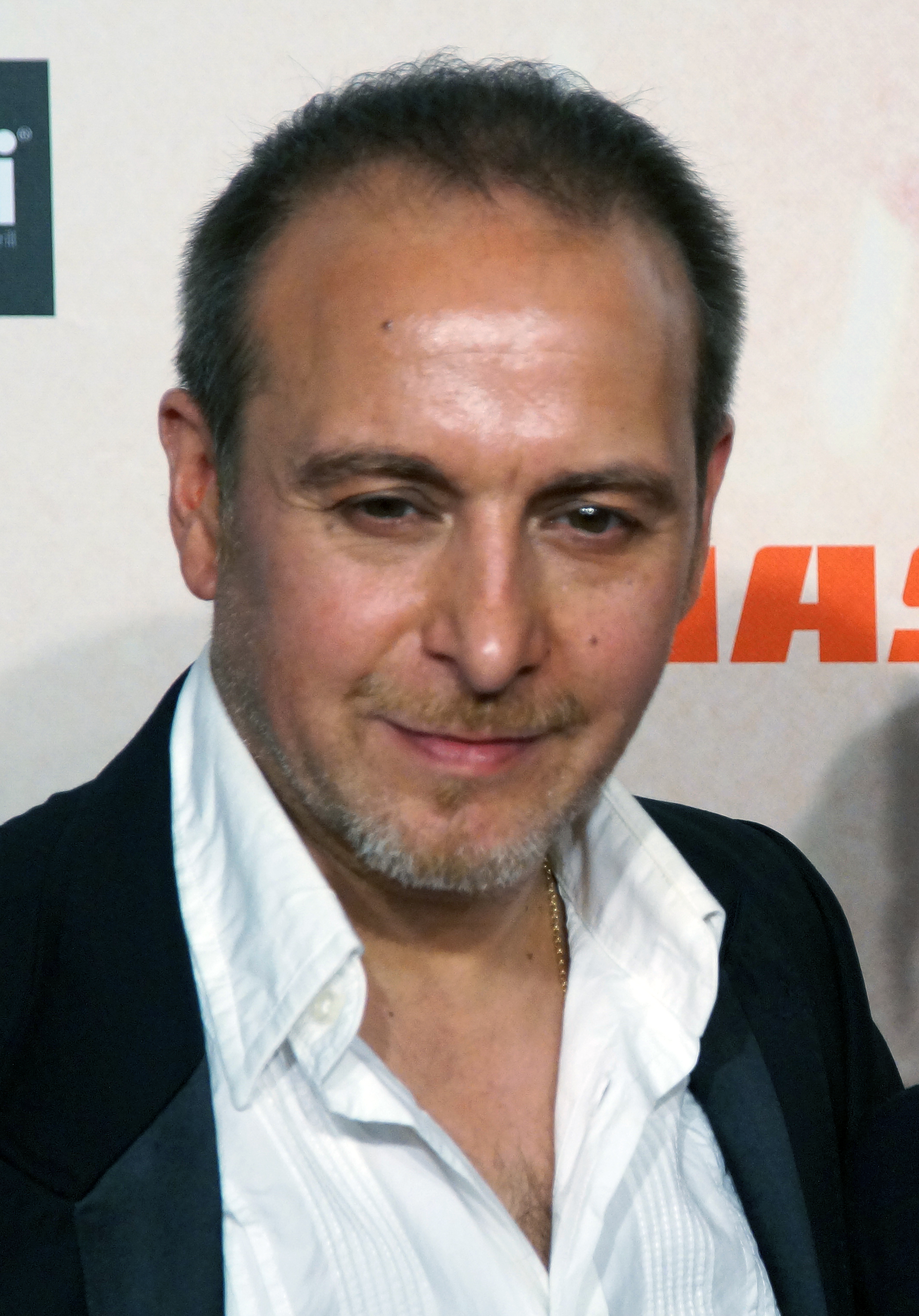
- Atalay, April 2016
- Born: 22 September 1966 (age 59); Hanover, West Germany
- Occupation: Actor
- Years active: 1990–present
- Known for: Semir Gerkhan in Alarm für Cobra 11
- Height: 160 cm (5 ft 3 in)

Erdoğan Atalay (born 22 September 1966) is a German actor. He is known for his role as police detective Semir Gerkhan in Alarm für Cobra 11 - Die Autobahnpolizei.

== Early life and career ==
Atalay was born in Hanover, West Germany, to a Turkish father and German mother. He was a member of the Theater-AG at the IGS Garbsen. At age 18, he made his first appearance as a supporting role in "Aladdin and the Magic Lamp" at the National Theatre of Hanover before studying acting at the Hochschule für Musik und Theater Hamburg. Afterwards he took on guest roles in several German television series such as Music Groschenweise, Einsatz für Lohbeck, Doppelter Einsatz and Die Wache.

In March 1996, Action Concept cast Atalay in what would become his breakthrough role, starring as Semir Gerkhan, a police detective of Turkish origin. Atalay co-wrote the screenplay for one of the series' episodes, titled "Checkmate," and is a consulting producer for the series as of 2016. In 2005, Atalay published a short story, "Die Türkei ist da oben" ("Turkey is Up There"), in the German-Turkish anthology Was lebbt du?. In September 2012 he shot together with Ilka Bessin (Cindy from Marzahn) the short film "Alarm for Cindy 11", a parody of Alarm for Cobra 11. The short film was broadcast on September 15, 2012, in the program.

== Personal life ==
Atalay's first marriage was to film and theatre actress Astrid Pollmann in 2004; the couple separated in late 2009. They have one daughter, Pauletta, who has also starred alongside her father in Alarm für Cobra 11 as Ayda Gerkhan, the middle child of Semir Gerkhan. His second child was born in mid-2012 to makeup artist and manager Katja Ohneck, with whom he is married as of 2017.

== Filmography ==
Film

- 1997: Sperling und der falsche Freund
- 1998: Der Clown
- 2000: Liebe Pur
- 2002: Maximum Speed
- 2006: Hammer und Hart
- 2011: Geister all inclusive
- 2015: Macho Man
- 2018: Asphaltgorillas

TV

- 1990: Musik Groschenweise
- 1994: Die Wache
- 1995: Doppelter Einsatz
- 1996–present: Alarm für Cobra 11 – Die Autobahnpolizei
- 1999–2000: Hinter Gittern – Der Frauenknast (3 episodes)
- 2003: Alarm für Cobra 11 – Einsatz für Team 2
- 2010: C.I.S. – Chaoten im Sondereinsatz
- 2012: SOKO 5113
- 2012: Cindy aus Marzahn und die jungen Wilden
- 2013: Mordkommission Istanbul
- 2016: SOKO Stuttgart – Fluch des Geldes
- since 2019: Die Martina Hill Show (7 episodes, Alarm für Mutti 11)

Theatre

- 1984: Aladdin and the Magic Lamp (Staatstheater Hannover)
