= Sutyagin House =

Wooden house in Arkhangelsk, Russia

- Dom Sutyagina
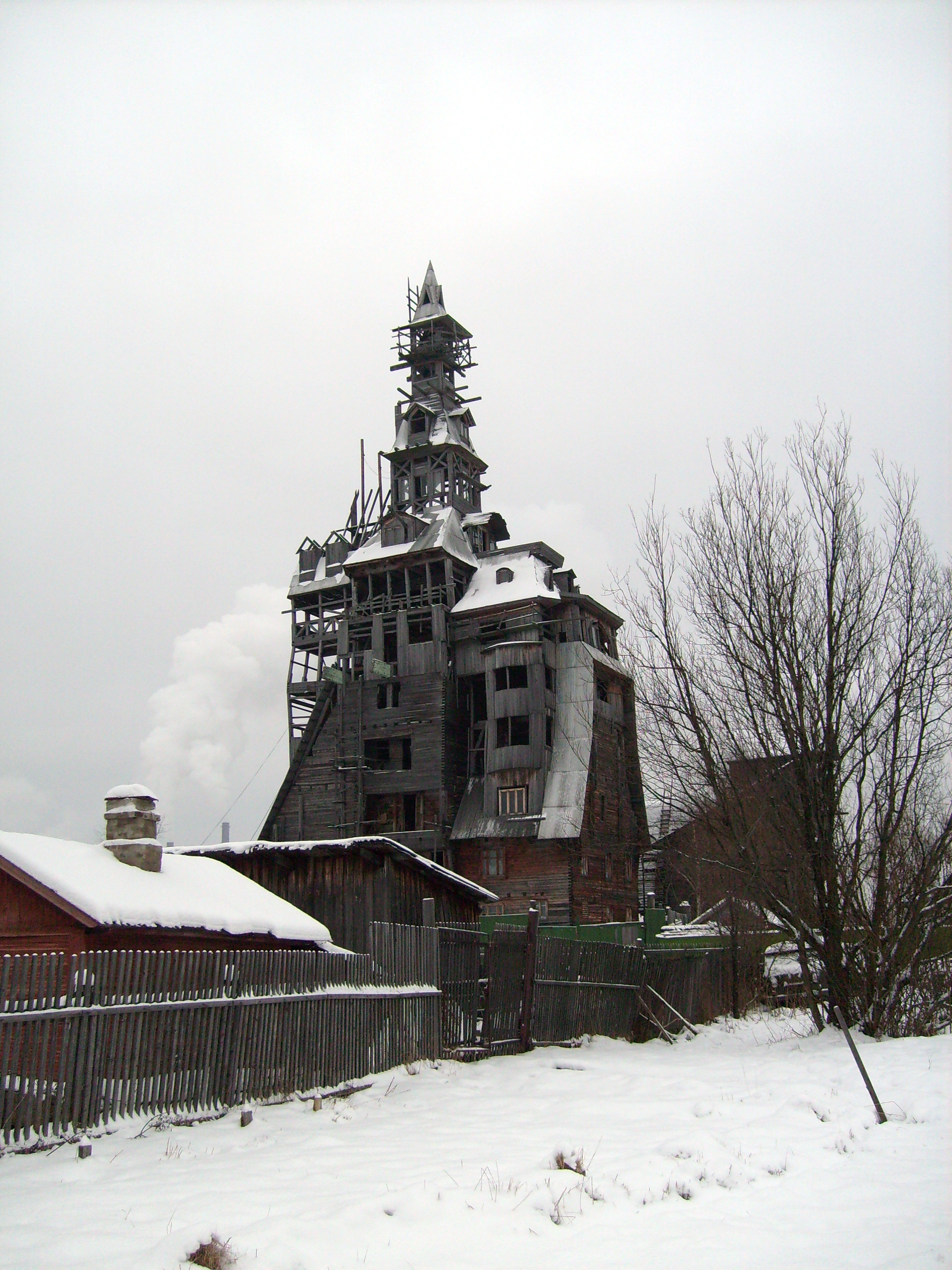
- "Sutyagin House", claimed to be the world's tallest wooden single-family house
- Interactive map of the Sutyagin House area

General information
- Status: Demolished
- Type: landmark, single-family house
- Location: Yuzhnaya Ulitsa, Arkhangelsk, Russia
- Coordinates: 64°34′43″N 40°32′34″E
- Construction started: 1992
- Demolished: 2008
- Owner: Nikolai Petrovich Sutyagin

Height
- Height: 44-metre-tall (144 ft)

Technical details
- Floor count: 13 (maybe 12)

The Sutyagin House (Russian: Дом Сутягина, Dom Sutyagina; also called Деревянный небоскрёб, "wooden skyscraper", or Соломбальский небоскрёб, "Solombala skyscraper") was a wooden house in Arkhangelsk, Russia.

The 13-story, 44-metre-tall (144 ft) house of the local resident Nikolai Petrovich Sutyagin was reported to be the world's, or at least Russia's, tallest wooden house, exceeding even the height of Kizhi Pogost, the said to be the tallest wooden church in Russia (actually it is not correct: the Church of the Transfiguration in Kizhi is only 37 meters high; the tallest surviving wooden church, and indeed the tallest of all wooden buildings in Russia, is the Church of the Ascension in Piyala, Arkhangelsk region, 45 m or 148 ft, built in 1654). Constructed by Mr. Sutyagin (a sawmill owner) and his family over 15 years (starting in 1992), without formal plans or a building permit, the structure deteriorated while Sutyagin spent a number of years in prison for racketeering.

In 2008, it was condemned by local authorities as a fire hazard, and the courts ordered it to be fully demolished by 1 February 2009. On December 26, 2008, the tower was pulled down, and the remainder was dismantled manually over the course of the next several months. The remaining four-story structure burned to the ground on 6 May 2012.

== Gallery ==
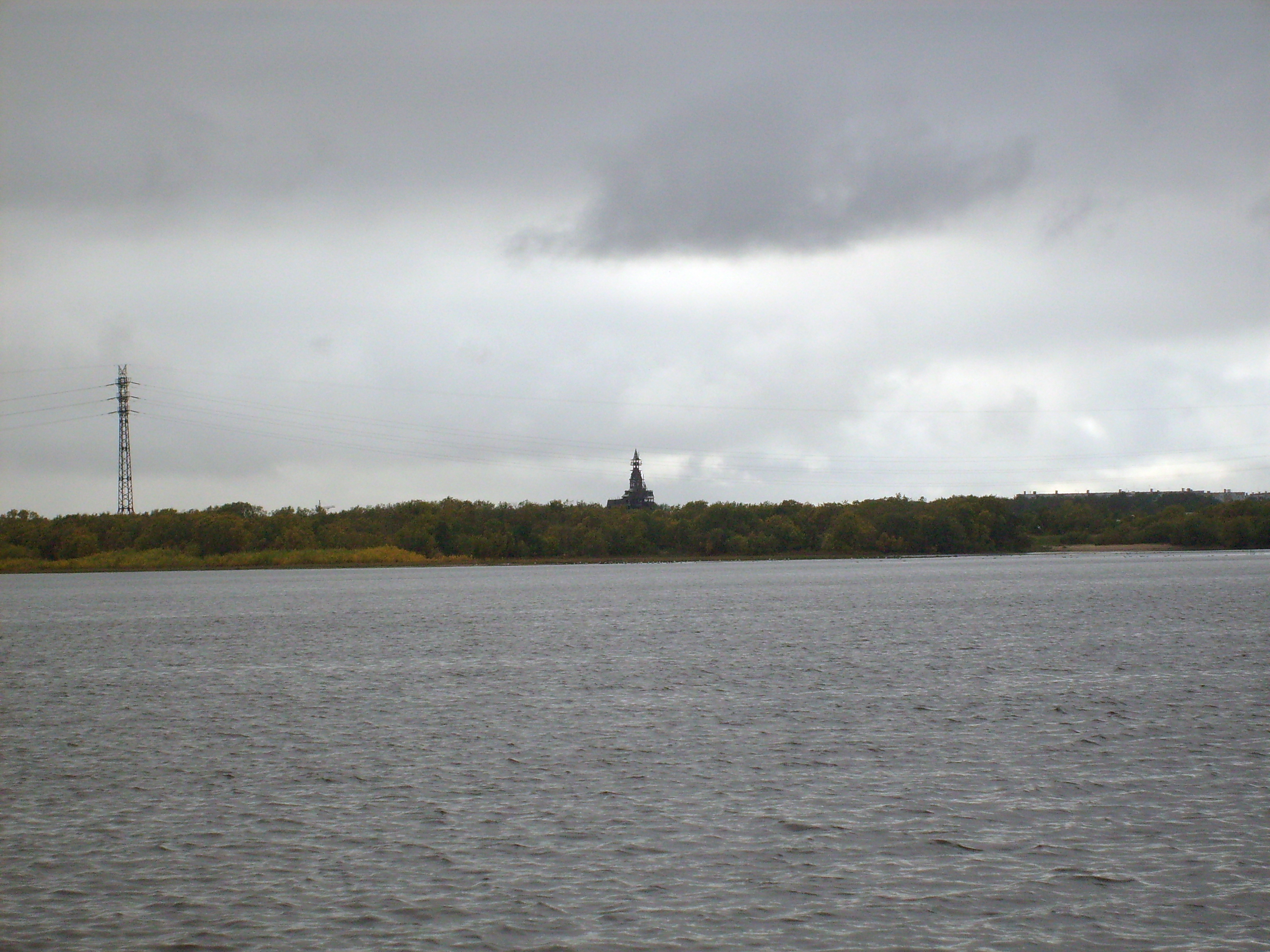

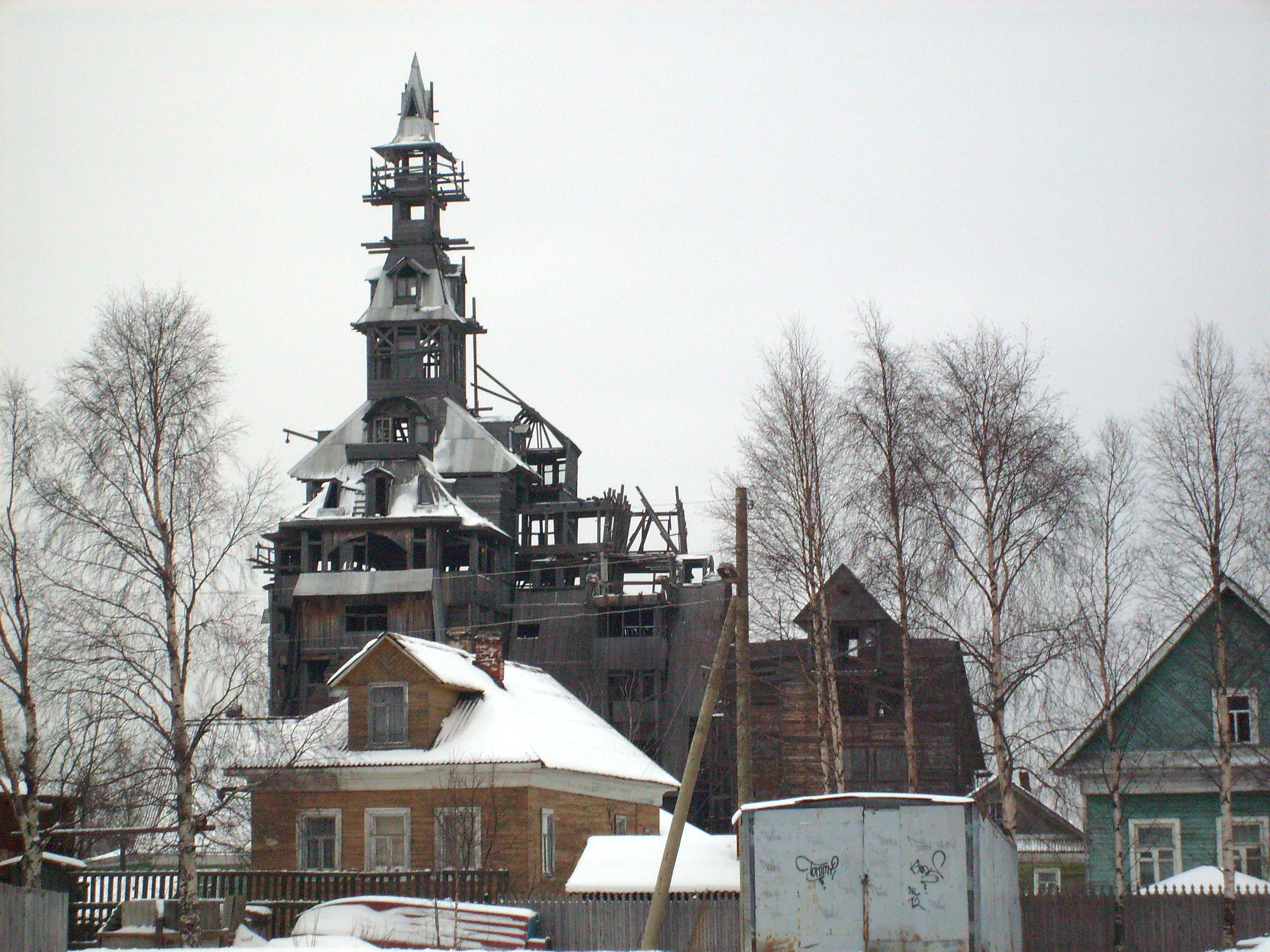

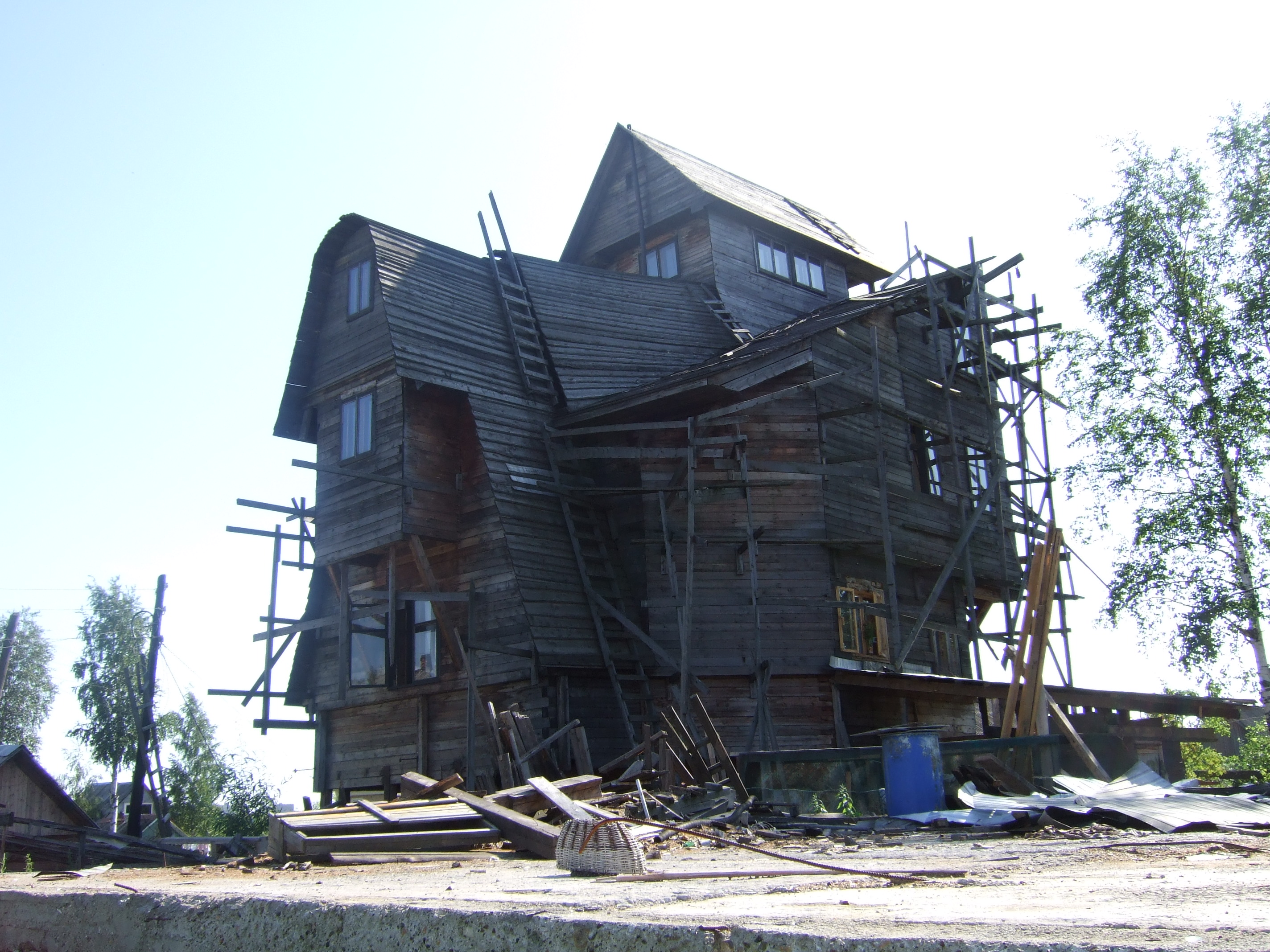
A sauna built next to the house

== See also ==
- Illegal construction
- Vernacular architecture
- List of tallest wooden buildings
