= Alexander Dobrunov =

Russian martial artist

- Birth name: Alexander Dobrunov
- Born: 6 May 1959; Arkhangelsk, Russian SFSR, Soviet Union
- Died: 7 February 2006 (aged 46)

Alexander Dobrunov (May 6, 1959 – February 7, 2006) was a Russian judo fighter and trainer.

He was first trained in Greco-Roman wrestling by Vladimir Beskokotov in Novodvinsk (Arkhangelsk Oblast). Later, his father (who was an engineer) received a new work in Arkhangelsk. As such, he moved with family, and Alexander Dobrunov started to take judo classes there. At age 22, Dobrunov received the first dan and he became a Master of Sports of the USSR and he became a member of the Russian national judo team.

He won national competitions in judo and sambo. He became a champion of the Arkhangelsk Oblast in judo twelve times.

Dobrunov was a teacher, and later in his career he became trainer of the "High Category". He also was a trainer at the School of High Sports Mastery in Arkhangelsk. During his career he has prepared 11 Masters of Sports of Russia and USSR in judo. Dobrunov was also a member of the Trainer Council of the National Team of the USSR. He was one of the founders of the judo federation in the Arkhangelsk Oblast where he served as president for 11 years.

From 1990 to 1998 he was a member of the Presidium of the Russian Judo Federation.
