= Victor Ferin =

Russian actor and filmmaker

- Born: 1969; Arkhangelsk, USSR
- Other names: Viktor Ferin, Viktor Ferine, Victor Ferine
- Occupation(s): Actor, filmmaker
- Years active: 2004–present

Victor Ferin or Viktor Ferin (born 1969) is a Russian actor and filmmaker.

== Biography ==
Victor Ferin was born in Arkhangelsk in 1969. In addition to his work as an actor in Germany, for example in film projects of the Academy of Media Arts Cologne such as The Clearing (Die Lichtung) or Wanja gehen, Ferin also works as a cinematographer. He took over the camera work for the Russian filmmaker Pavel Borodin in his documentary works Elliott Sharp: The Velocity of Hue. Live in Cologne or Phil Minton / Dieb13 – In the pavilion. Ferin also has been working for several years at the International Silent Film Festival (Interantionale Stummfilmtage) in Bonn and was a member of the cinema – jury of the International Short Film Festival Oberhausen in 2004.

== Filmography (selection) ==
- 2005: Wanja gehen (short film), (actor), (directed by Jens Grünhagen)
- 2007: Elliott Sharp: The Velocity of Hue. Live in Cologne (Concert film), (cinematographer), (directed by Pavel Borodin)
- 2008: The Clearing (Die Lichtung), (short film), (actor), (directed by Lucas Tietjen)
- 2009: Speak Easy – The Loft Concert (Concert film), (cinematographer), (directed by Pavel Borodin)
- 2010: Unlimited 23 (Music documentary), (cinematographer), (directed by Pavel Borodin)
- 2011: Alarm für Cobra 11 – Die Autobahnpolizei – Mitten ins Herz (TV series), (actor), (directed by Heinz Dietz)
- 2012: The Feral Voice (Music documentary), (cinematographer), (directed by Pavel Borodin)
- 2012: Alarm für Cobra 11 – Die Autobahnpolizei – Operation Hiob (TV series), (actor), (directed by Nico Zavelberg)
- 2013: Phil Minton / Dieb13 – Im Pavillon (Concert film), (cinematographer), (directed by Pavel Borodin)
- 2013: The Tundra Tale (Die Hüter der Tundra) (German translation)
- 2017: Painters at work (Die Maler kommen), (short film), (actor), (directed by Stefan Lampadius)
- 2021: Gomorrah - Episode 2 (TV series), (actor), (directed by Marco D'Amore)
