= Arkhangelsk =

City in Arkhangelsk Oblast, Russia

Arkhangelsk Архангельск
- City
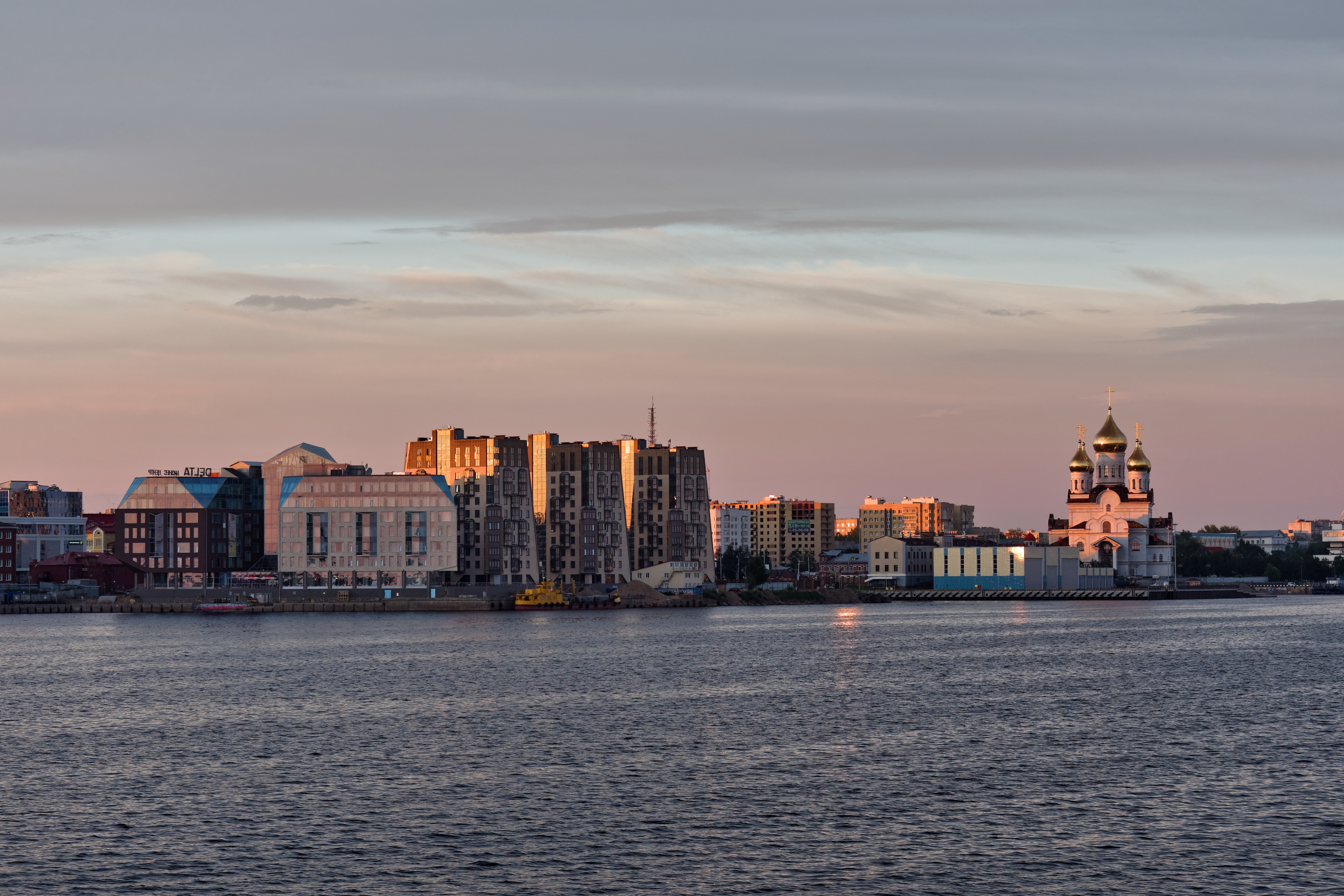
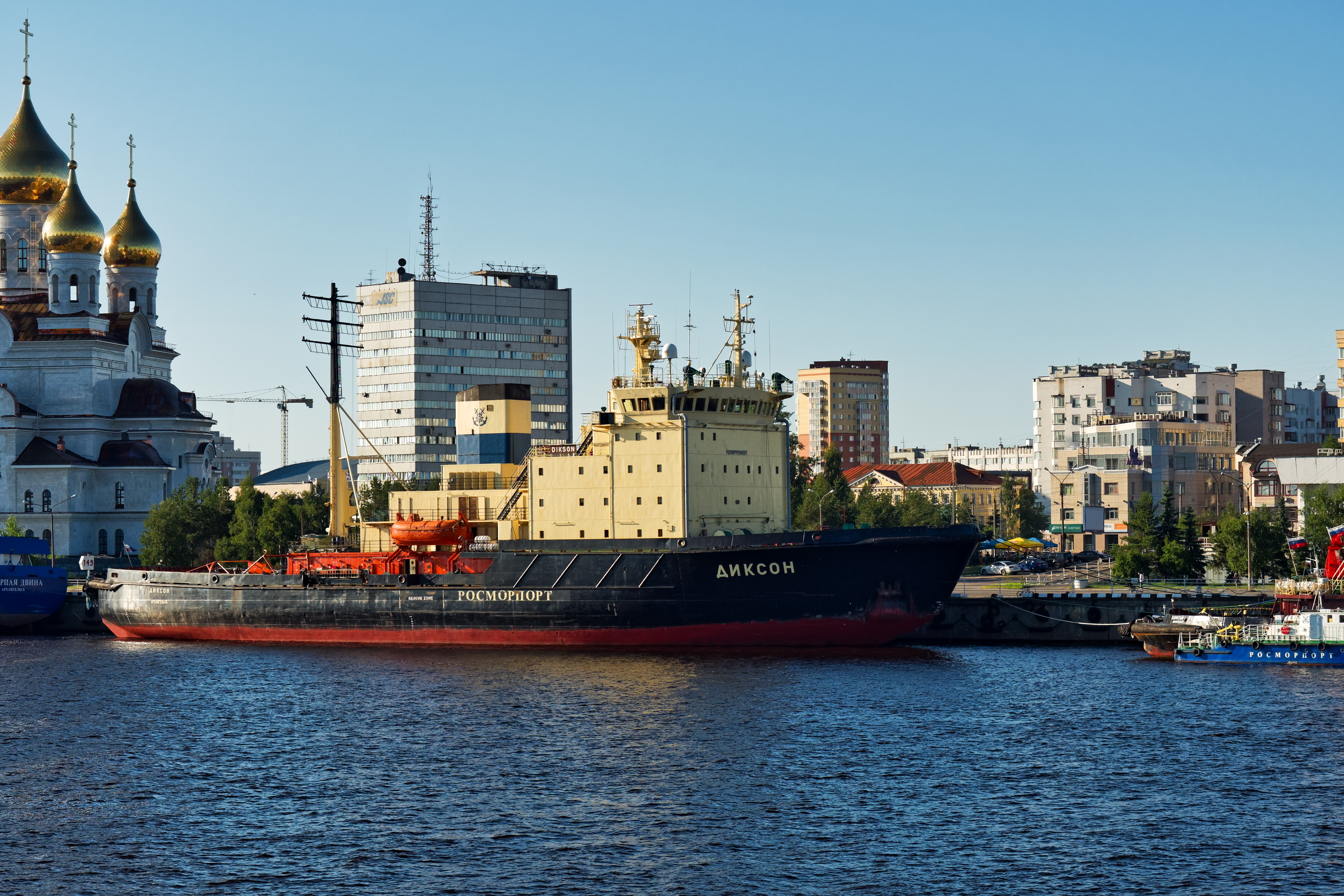
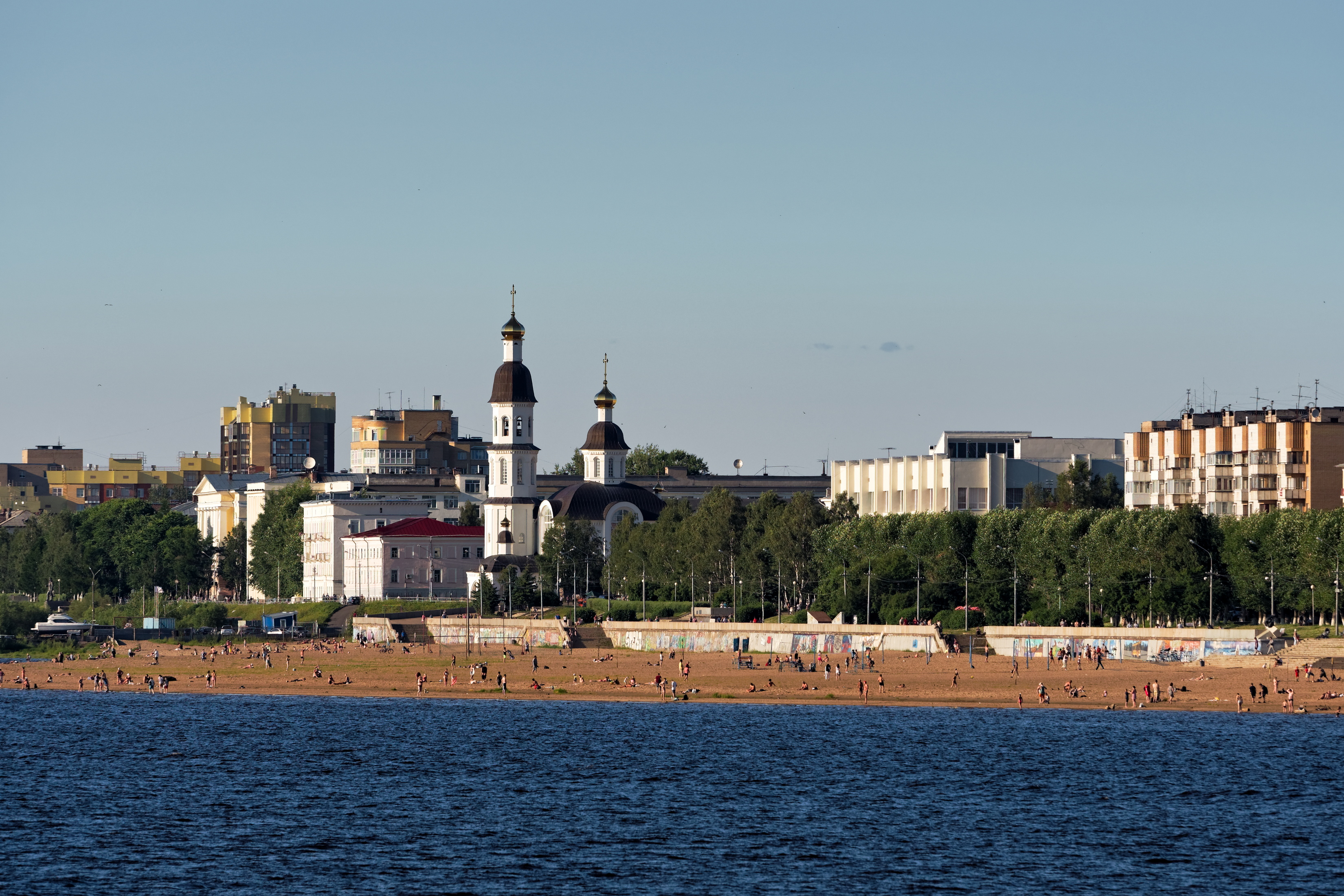
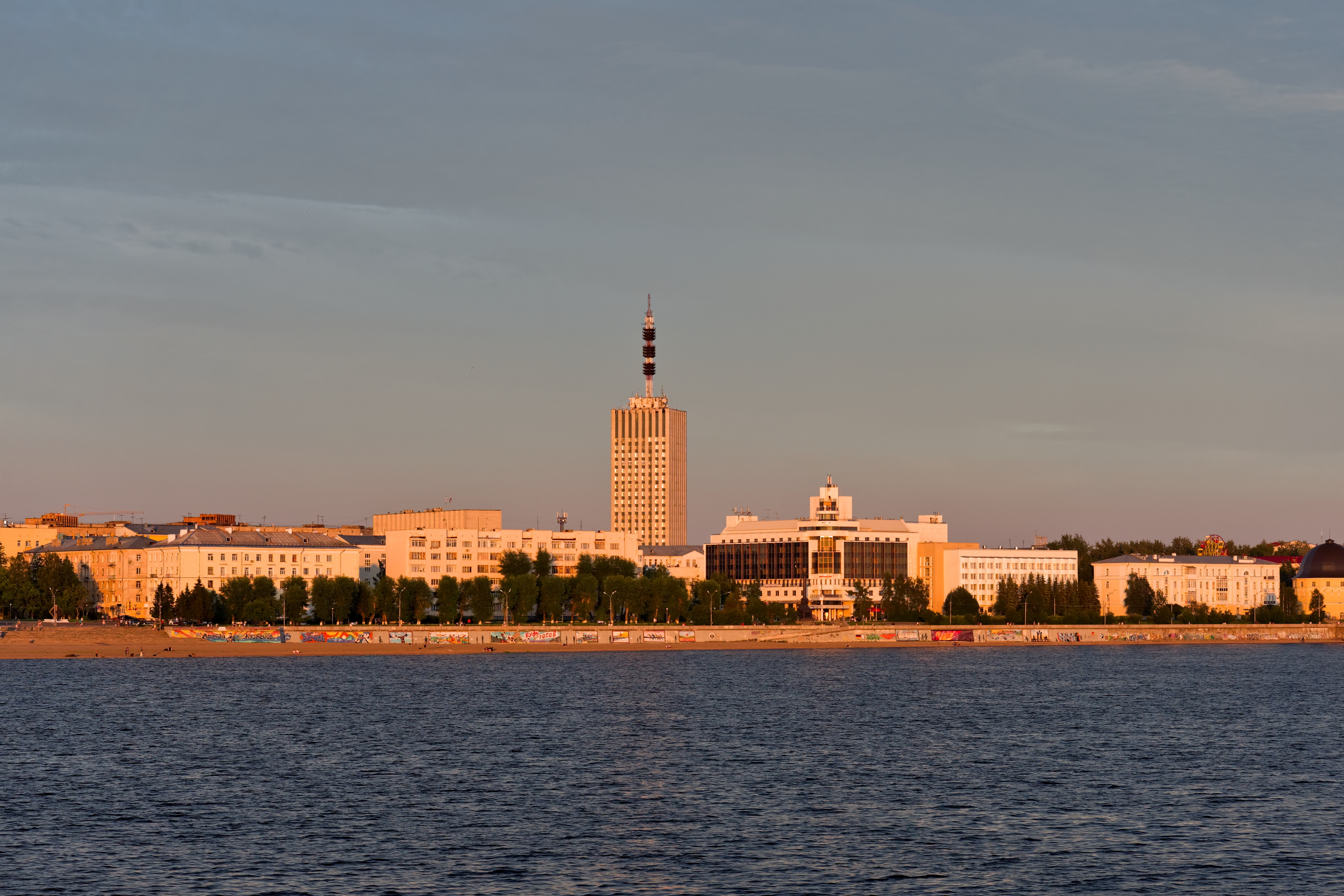
- Top-down, left-to-right: View along the Northern Dvina river; Port of Arkhangelsk; Church of the Dormition and sea beach; view to the skyscraper Vysotka

- Flag Coat of arms
- Interactive map of Arkhangelsk
- Location of Arkhangelsk Arkhangelsk (European Russia) Arkhangelsk (Russia) Arkhangelsk (Europe)
- Coordinates: 64°32′35″N 40°32′15″E
- Country: Russia
- Federal subject: Arkhangelsk Oblast
- Novo-Kholmogory: 1584
- City status since: 1584

Government
  - Body: City Duma
  - Head: Dmitry Morev

Area
  - Total: 294.42 km^{2} (113.68 sq mi)
- Elevation: 3 m (9.8 ft)

Population (2010 Census)
  - Total: 348,783
  - Estimate (2025): 350,985 (+0.6%)
  - Rank: 50th in 2010
  - Density: 1,185/km^{2} (3,070/sq mi)

Administrative status
  - Subordinated to: city of oblast significance of Arkhangelsk
  - Capital of: Arkhangelsk Oblast, city of oblast significance of Arkhangelsk

Municipal status
  - Urban okrug: Arkhangelsk Urban Okrug
  - Capital of: Arkhangelsk Urban Okrug, Primorsky Municipal District
- Time zone: UTC+3 (MSK)
- Postal code: 163000-163071
- Dialing code: +7 8182
- OKTMO ID: 11701000001
- City Day: Last Sunday of June
- Website: www.arhcity.ru

Arkhangelsk (Note: UK: /ˌɑːrkæŋˈɡɛlsk, ɑːrˈkæŋɡɛlsk/, US: /ɑːrˈkɑːnɡɛlsk/;) (Russian: Архангельск, pronounced [ɐrˈxanɡʲɪlʲsk]), historically called in English Archangel and later Archangelsk, is the administrative center and largest city of Arkhangelsk Oblast, Russia. It lies on both banks of the Northern Dvina River, near its mouth into the White Sea. The city spreads for over 40 kilometres (25 mi) along the banks of the river and numerous islands of its delta. Arkhangelsk was the chief seaport of medieval and early modern Russia until 1703, when it was replaced by the newly founded Saint Petersburg.

A 1,133-kilometer-long (704 mi) railway runs from Arkhangelsk to Moscow via Vologda and Yaroslavl, and air travel is served by the Talagi Airport and the smaller Vaskovo Airport. As of the 2021 Census, the city's population was 301,199.

== Coat of arms ==
The arms of the city display the Archangel Michael in the act of defeating the Devil. Legend states that this victory took place near where the city stands, hence its name, and that Michael still stands watch over the city to prevent the Devil's return.

== History ==
=== Early history ===
Vikings knew the area around Arkhangelsk as Bjarmaland. Ohthere of Hålogaland told circa 890 of his travels in an area by a river and the White Sea with many buildings. This was probably the place later known as Arkhangelsk. According to Snorri Sturluson, Vikings led by Thorir Hund raided this area in 1027.

In 1989, an unusually impressive silver treasure was found by local farm workers by the mouth of the Northern Dvina, right next to present-day Arkhangelsk.

Most of the findings comprised a total of 1.6 kilograms (3.5 lb) of silver, largely in the form of coins. Jewelry and pieces of jewelry come from Russia or neighboring areas. The majority of the coins were German, but the hoard also included a smaller number of Kufan, English, Bohemian, Hungarian, Danish, Swedish and Norwegian coins. It is hard to place this find historically until further research is completed. There are at least two possible interpretations. It may be a treasure belonging to the society outlined by the Norse source material. Generally such finds, whether from Scandinavia, the Baltic area, or Russia, are closely tied to well-established agricultural societies with considerable trade activity.

Alternatively, like the Russian scientists who published the find in 1992, one may see it as evidence of a stronger case of Russian colonization than previously thought.

=== Novgorodian arrival ===
In the 12th century, the Novgorodians established a monastery dedicated to Archangel Michael in the estuary of the Northern Dvina. The main trade center of the area at that time was Kholmogory, located 75 kilometers (47 mi) southeast of Arkhangelsk, up the Dvina River, about 10 kilometers (6.2 mi) downstream from where the Pinega River flows into the Dvina. Written sources indicate that Kholmogory existed early in the 12th century, but there is no archeological material of this period. It is not known whether the origin of this settlement was Russian, or if it goes back to pre-Russian times. In the center of the small town (or Gorodok) that is there today is a large mound of building remains and river sand, but it has not been archeologically excavated.

=== Norwegian–Russian conflict ===
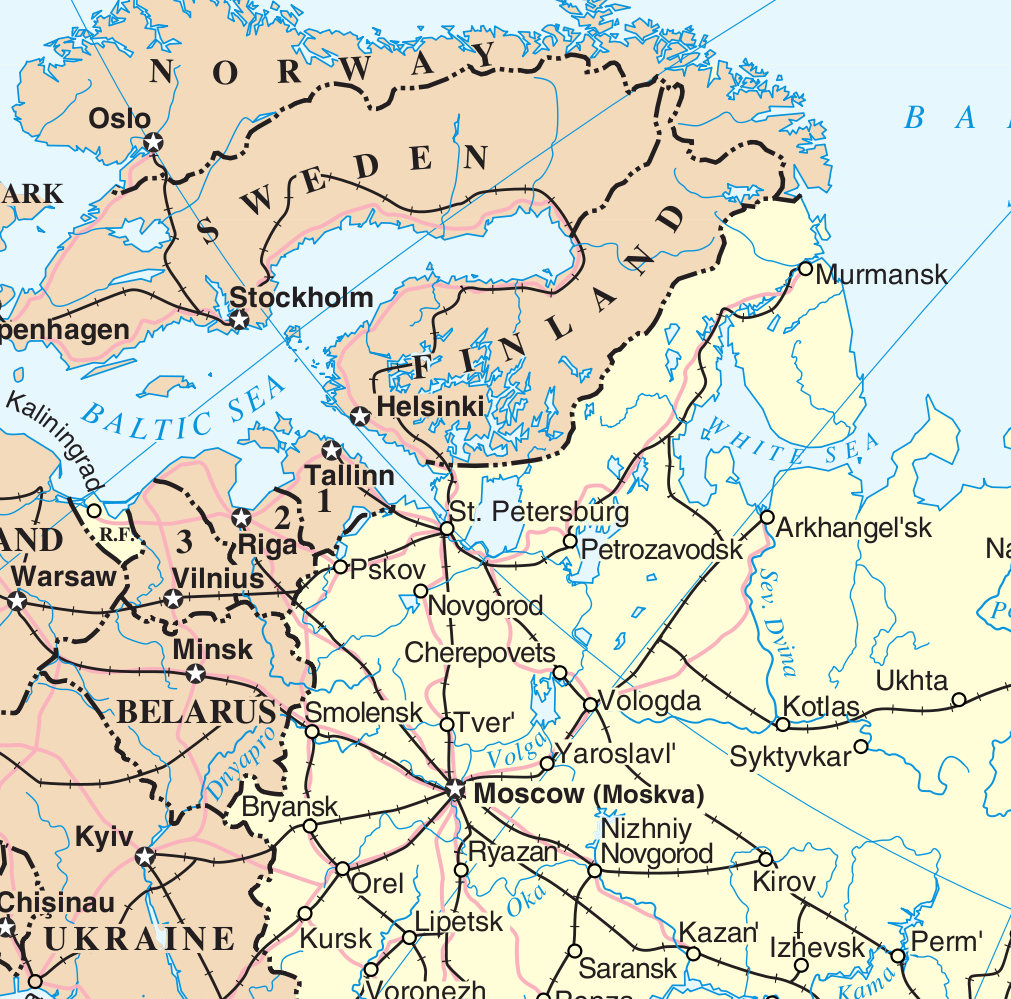
Location of Arkhangelsk in northwestern Russia

The area of Arkhangelsk came to be important in the rivalry between Norwegian and Russian interests in the northern areas. From Novgorod, the spectrum of Russian interest was extended far north to the Kola Peninsula in the 12th century. However, here Norway enforced taxes and rights to the fur trade. A compromise agreement entered in 1251 which was soon broken.

In 1411, Yakov Stepanovich from Novgorod went to attack northern Norway. This was the beginning of a series of clashes. In 1419, Norwegian ships with five hundred soldiers entered the White Sea. The "Murmaners", as the Norwegians were called (cf. Murmansk), plundered many Russian settlements along the coast, among them the Archangel Michael Monastery.

Novgorod managed to drive the Norwegians back. However, in 1478 the area was taken over by Ivan III and passed to the Grand Duchy of Moscow with the rest of the Novgorod Republic.

=== Trade with England, Scotland, and the Netherlands ===
Three English ships, Bona Esperanza, Edward Bonaventure, and Bona Confidentia, set out to find the Northeast Passage to China in 1553; two disappeared, and one, the Edward Bonaventure, ended up in the White Sea at Nyonoksa, eventually coming across the area of Arkhangelsk at the mouth of the Dvina River where the St. Nicolas Monastery stood. Subsequently, the English gave the name "St. Nicolas Bay" to the sea now known as the White Sea. Ivan the Terrible found out about this, and brokered a trade agreement with the ship's captain, Richard Chancellor.

Trade privileges were granted to English merchants in 1555, leading to the founding of the Company of Merchant Adventurers, which began sending ships annually into the estuary of the Northern Dvina. Dutch merchants also started bringing their ships into the White Sea from the 1560s. Scottish and English merchants also traded in the 16th century; however, by the 17th century it was mainly the Dutch that sailed to the White Sea area.

=== Founding and further development ===
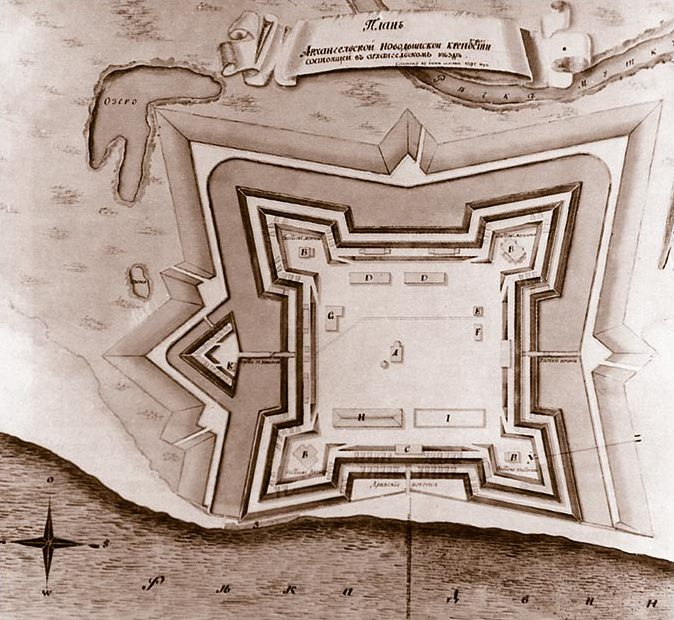
Plan of New Dvina Fort in Arkhangelsk

In 1584, Ivan IV ordered the founding of New Kholmogory (which was later renamed after the nearby Archangel Michael Monastery). At the time, access to the Baltic Sea was still largely controlled by Sweden, so although Arkhangelsk was icebound in winter, it remained Muscovy's principal outlet for maritime trade. Local inhabitants, known as Pomors, were among the first to explore trade routes to northern Siberia, reaching the trans-Ural town of Mangazeya and beyond. During the Time of Troubles, in December 1613, Arkhangelsk was besieged by Polish–Lithuanian Lisowczycy under Stanisław Jasinski, but the attackers failed to capture the fortified town. Major fires devastated Arkhangelsk in 1619 and again in 1637, destroying most of the wooden town.

In 1693, Peter the Great ordered the creation of a state shipyard in Arkhangelsk. A year later the ships Svyatoye Prorochestvo (Holy Prophecy), Apostol Pavel (Apostle Paul), and the yacht Svyatoy Pyotr (Saint Peter) were sailing in the White Sea. However, he also realized that Arkhangelsk would always be limited as a port due to the five months of ice cover, and after a successful campaign against Swedish armies in the Baltic area, he founded Saint Petersburg in May 1703. Nonetheless, Arkhangelsk continued to be an important naval base and maritime centre in the Russian north.

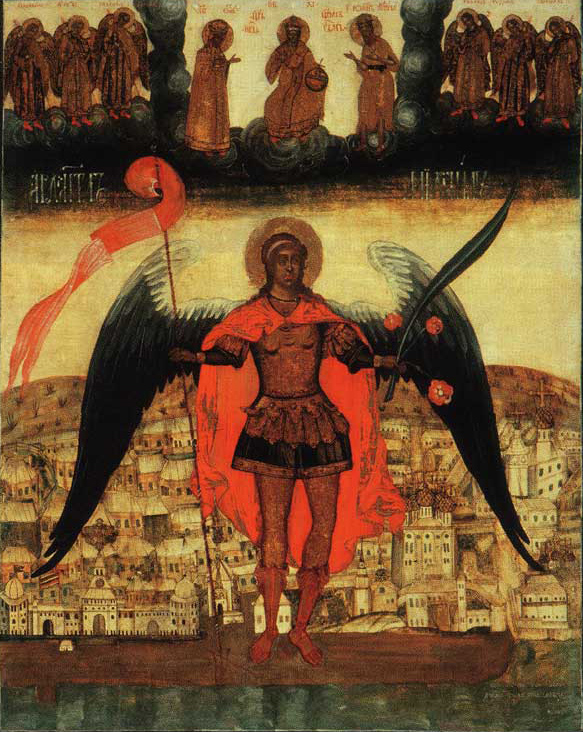
Icon of Archangel Michael, shown as protector of Arkhangelsk

In 1722, Peter the Great decreed that Arkhangelsk should no longer accept goods that amounted to more than was sufficient for the town (for so-called domestic consumption). It was due to the Tsar's will to shift all international marine trade to Saint Petersburg. This factor greatly contributed to the deterioration of Arkhangelsk that continued up to 1762 when this decree was cancelled.

Arkhangelsk declined in the 18th century as the Baltic trade became ever more important. Its economy revived at the end of the 19th century when a railway to Moscow was completed and timber became a major export. The city resisted Bolshevik rule from 1918 to 1920 and was a stronghold of the anti-Bolshevik White Army. The White Army was supported by an Allied intervention in which British, French, Italian, and American troops helped to defend against the Bolsheviks. The Allied forces, led by British Lieutenant General Frederick Poole, suffered numerous set-backs and eventually withdrew from Russia. Without Allied support, the poorly disciplined White Army quickly collapsed and the Bolsheviks entered Arkhangelsk on February 21, 1920. Arkhangelsk was also the scene of the Mudyug concentration camp.

During both world wars, Arkhangelsk was a major port of entry for Allied aid. During World War II, the city became known in West Europe as one of the two main destinations (along with Murmansk) of the Arctic convoys bringing supplies in to assist the Soviet Union. During Operation Barbarossa, the German invasion of the Soviet Union in 1941, Arkhangelsk was one of two cities (the other being Astrakhan) selected to mark the envisioned eastern limit of German control. This military operation was to be halted at this A–A line, but never reached it, as the German armies failed to capture either of these two cities and also failed to capture Moscow.

Arkhangelsk was also the site of Arkhangelsk ITL, or the Arkhangelsk Labour Camp, in the 1930s and 1940s.

Today, Arkhangelsk remains a major seaport, now open year-round due to improvements in icebreakers. The city is primarily a center for the timber and fishing industries.

On March 16, 2004, 58 people were killed in an explosion at a nine-storey apartment building in the city.

== Administrative and municipal status ==
Arkhangelsk is the administrative center of the oblast and, within the framework of administrative divisions, it also serves as the administrative center of Primorsky District, even though it is not a part of it. As an administrative division, it is, together with five rural localities, incorporated separately as the city of oblast significance of Arkhangelsk—an administrative unit with the status equal to that of the districts. As a municipal division, the city of oblast significance of Arkhangelsk is incorporated as Arkhangelsk Urban Okrug.

=== City divisions ===
For administrative purposes, the city is divided into nine territorial okrugs:

- Isakogorsky
- Lomonosovsky
- Maymaksansky
- Mayskaya Gorka
- Oktyabrsky
- Severny
- Solombalsky
- Tsiglomensky
- Varavino-Faktoriya

== Economy and infrastructure ==
=== Transportation ===
Arkhangelsk is the final destination of Northern Railway. In addition, the city is host to two airports, Vaskovo Airport and Talagi Airport where they host the 2nd Arkhangelsk United Aviation Division and Smartavia Airline, respectively. M8 highway provides a direct link to Moscow, Yaroslavl and Severodvinsk, the administrative center of the oblast. Local public transit is provided by buses and minibuses called marshrutkas. Until 2004 there were also trams, and until 2008, trolleybuses.

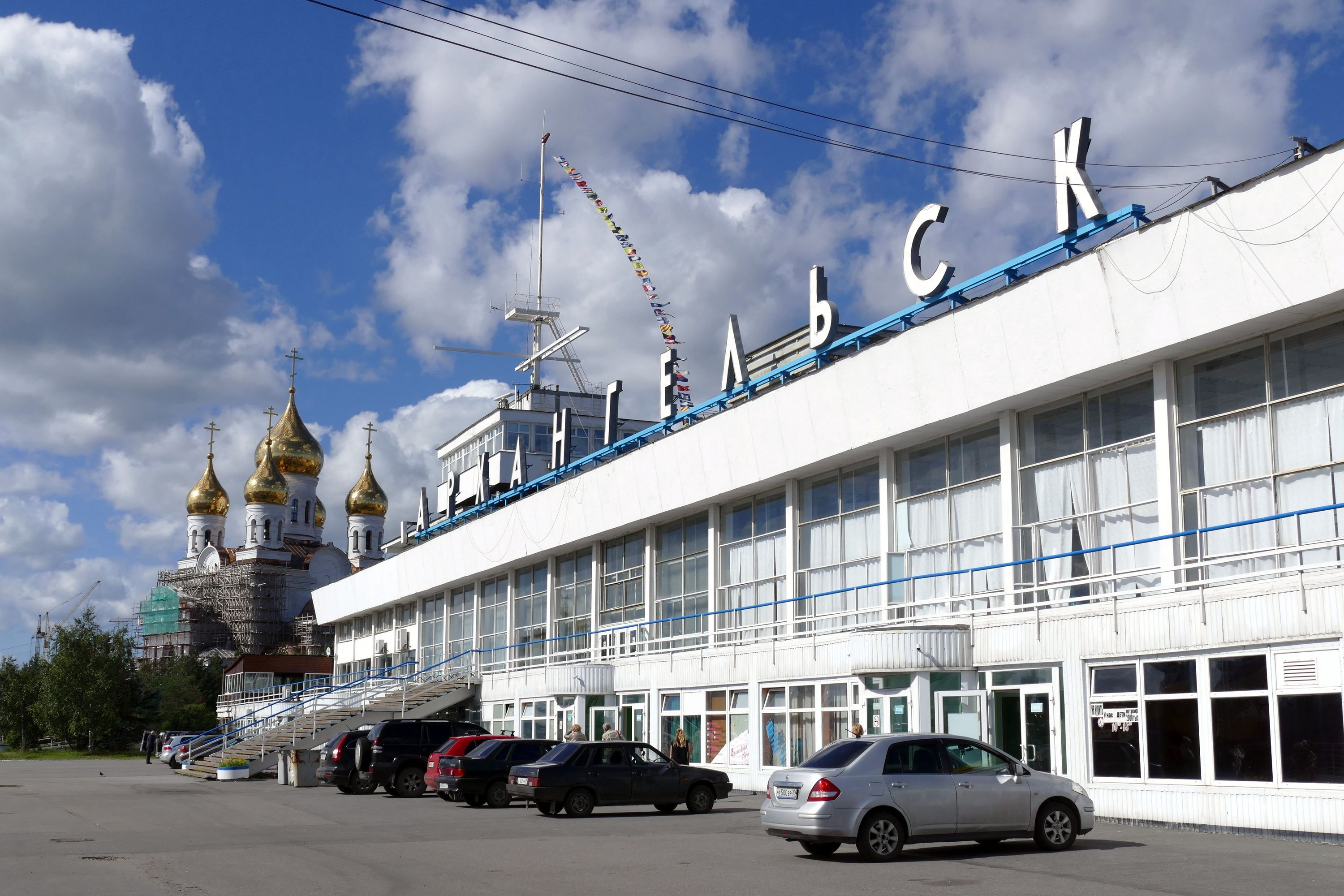
Port of Arkhangelsk

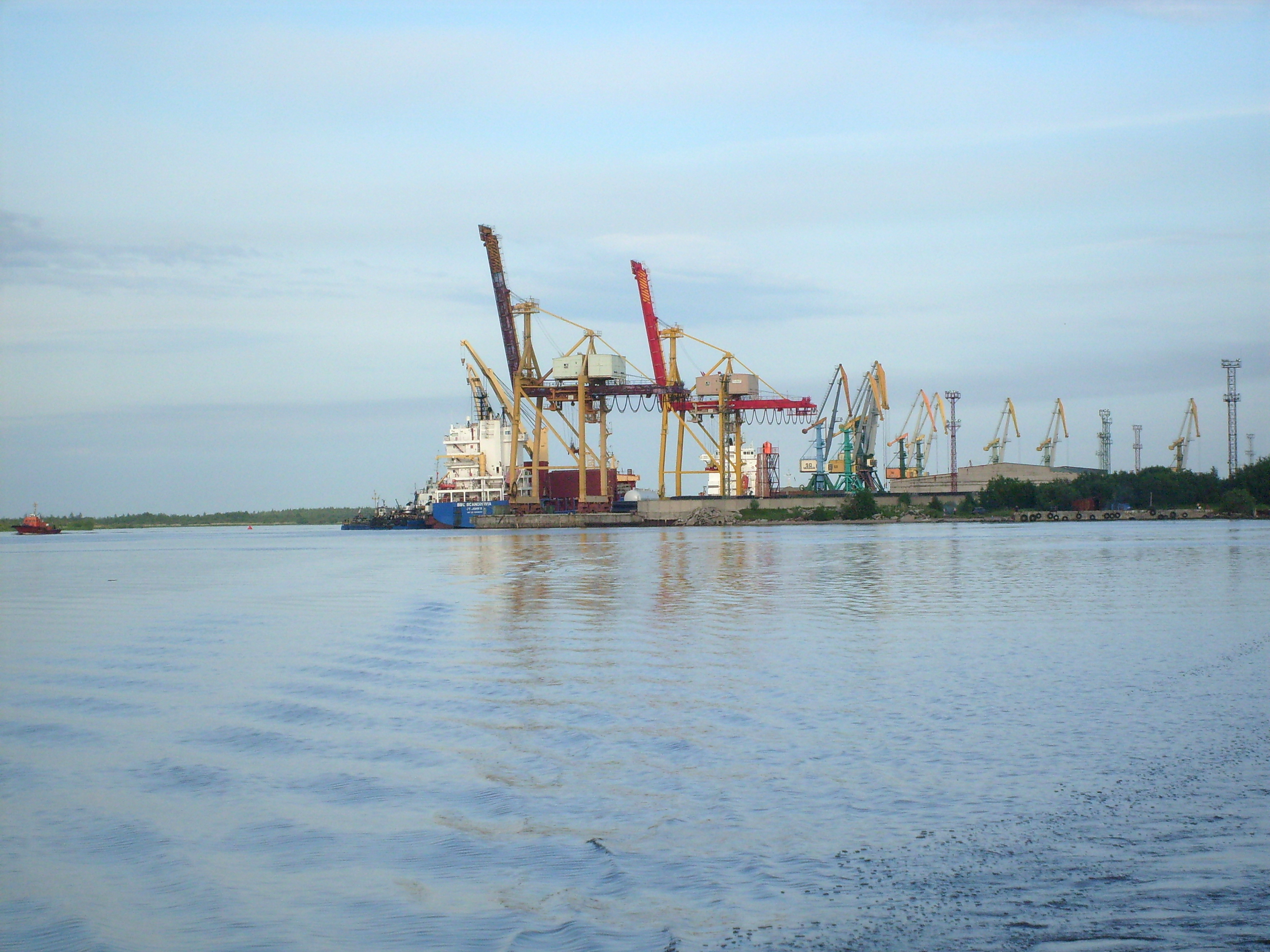
Port of Arkhangelsk

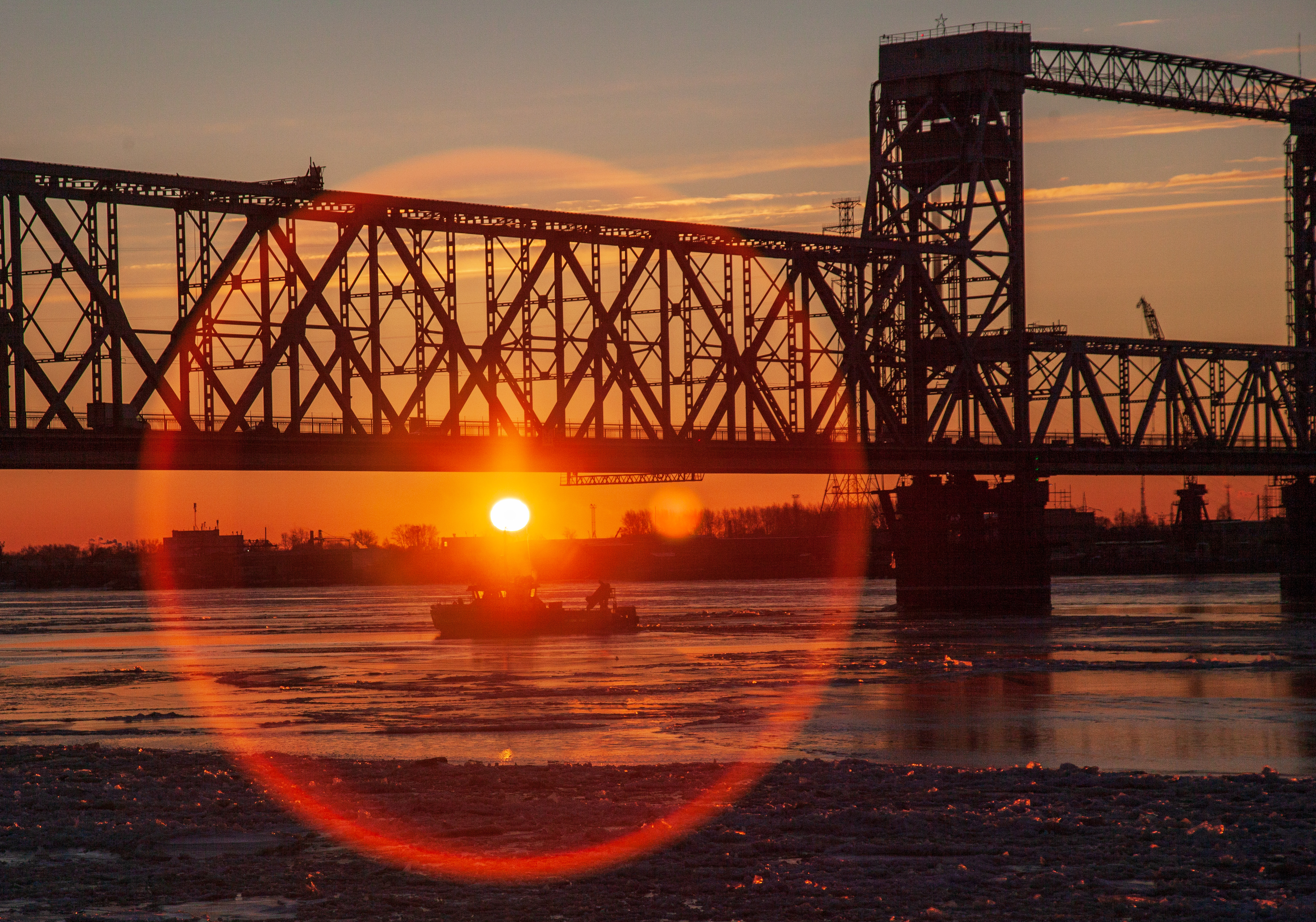
Severodvinsky bridge over Northern Dvina Canal

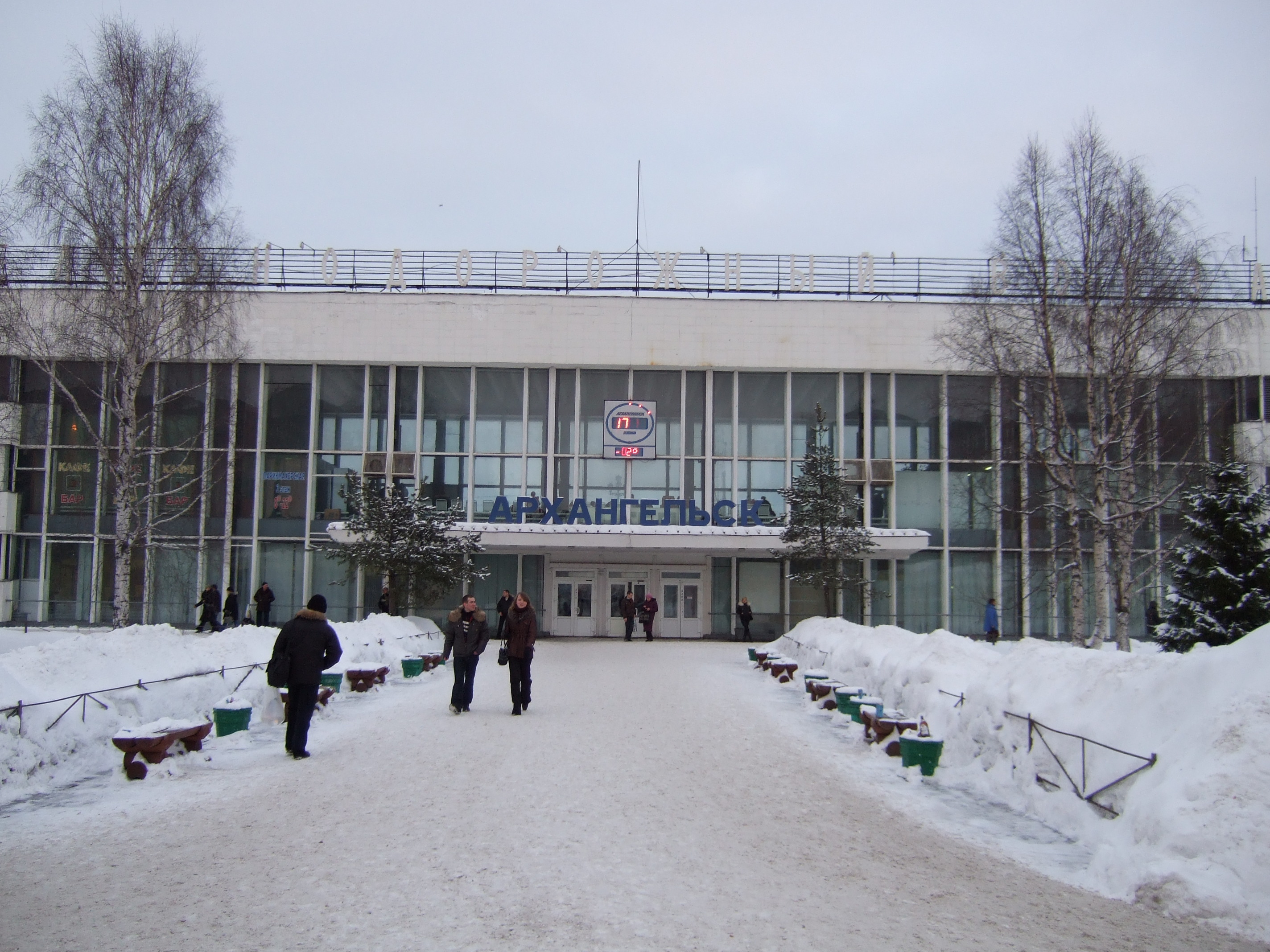
Arkhangelsk train station

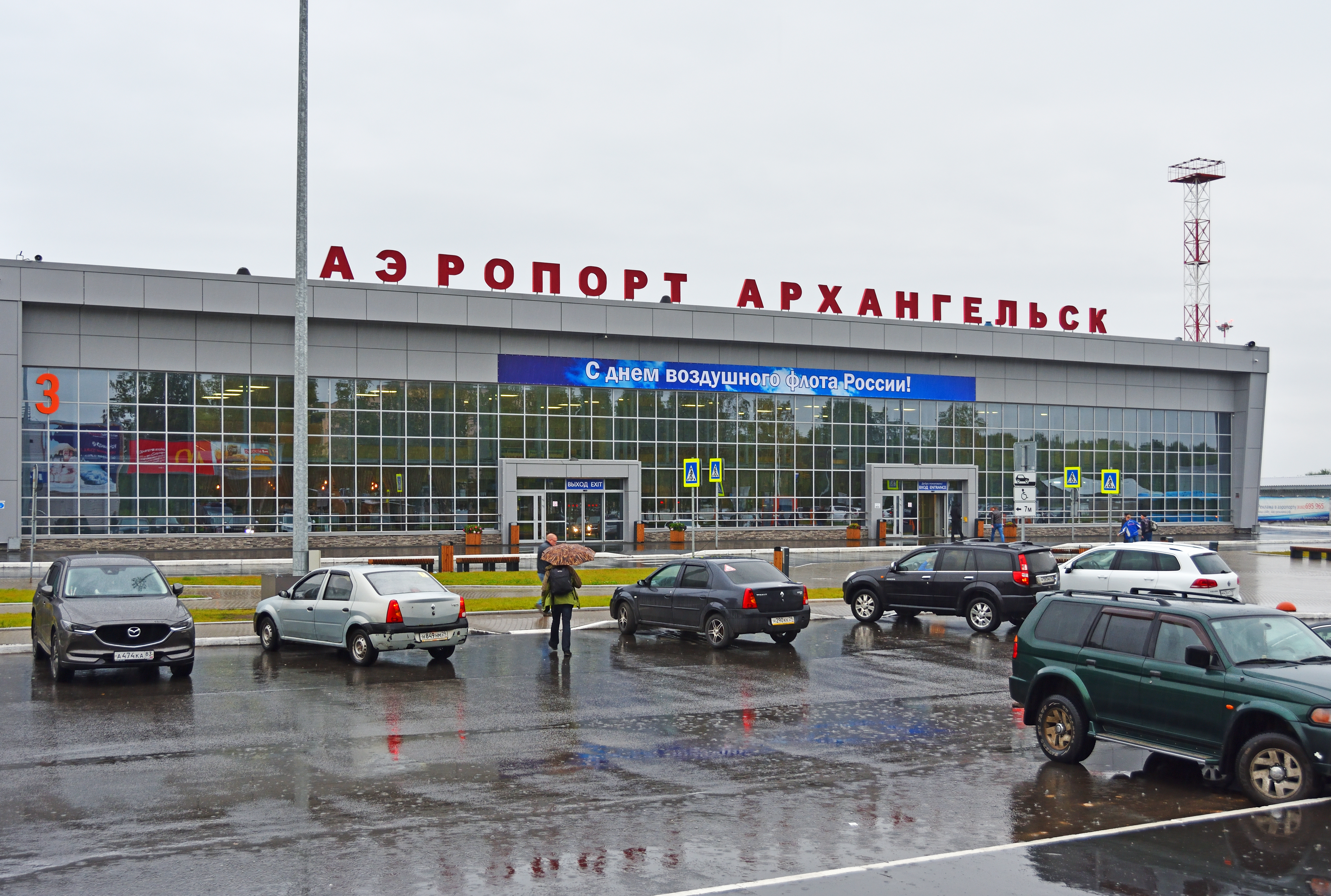
Talagi Airport

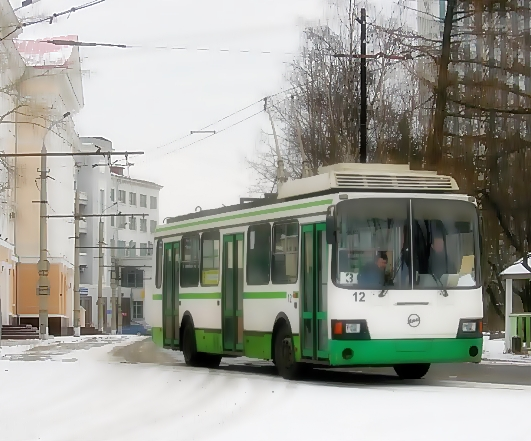
Trolleybuses in Arkhangelsk

== Education ==
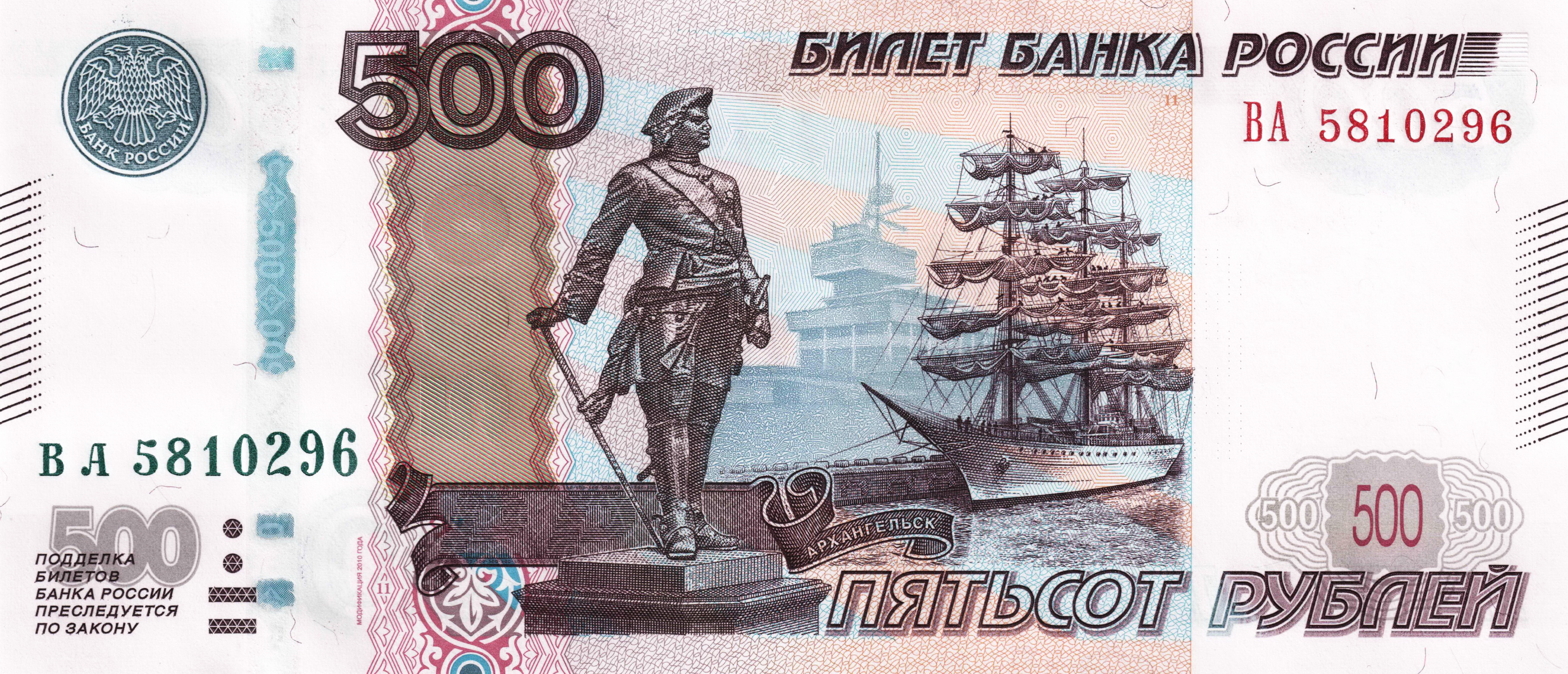
A monument to Peter the Great, a sailing ship, and the sea terminal in Arkhangelsk are depicted on a 500-ruble banknote

Arkhangelsk was home to Pomorsky State University and Arkhangelsk State Technical University which merged with several other institutions of higher learning in 2010 to form the Northern (Arctic) Federal University.

Arkhangelsk is home to the Northern State Medical University, Makarov state Maritime Academy, and a branch of the All-Russian Distance Institute of Finance and Economics.

== Culture ==
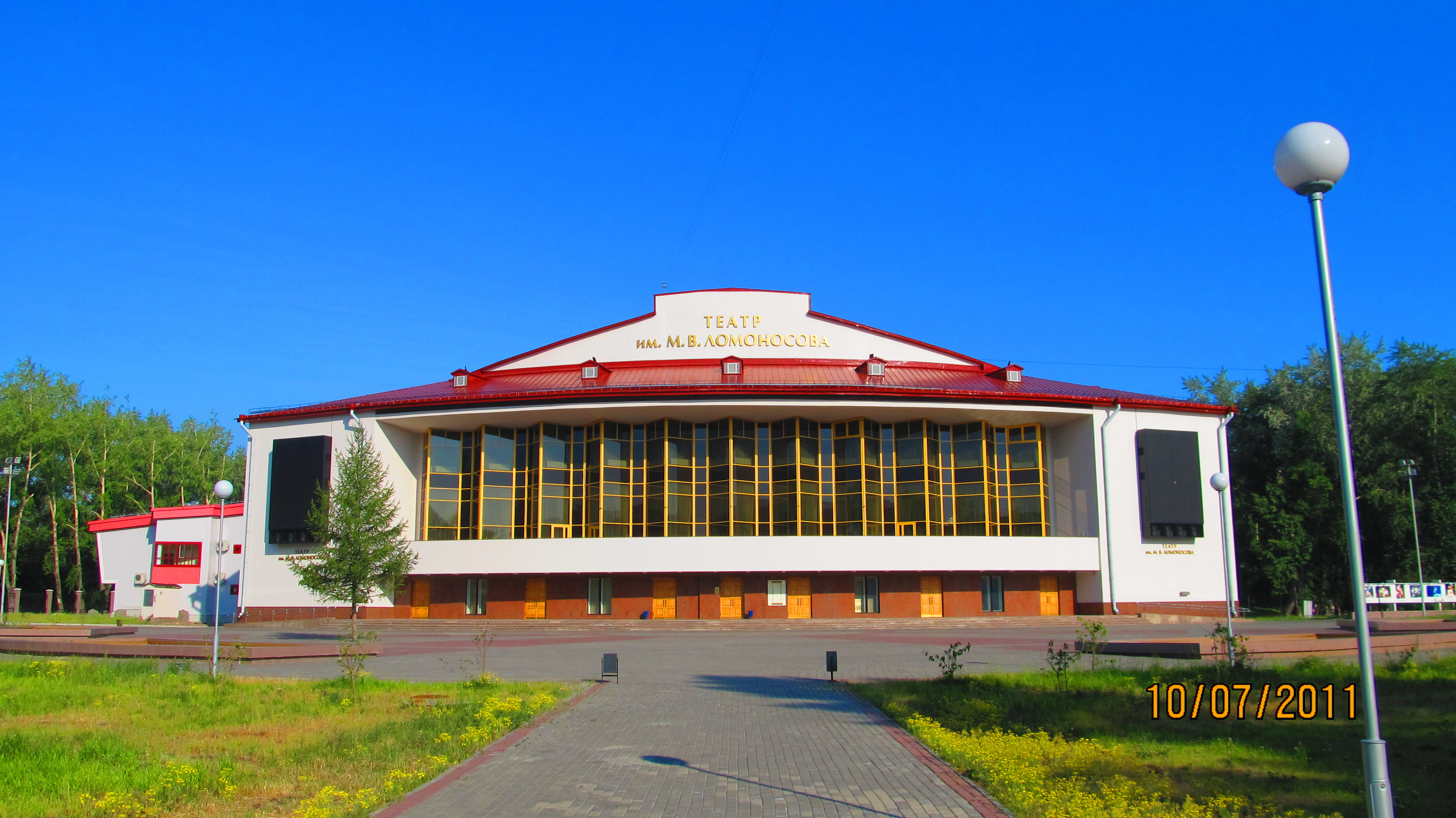
Arkhangelsk drama theatre

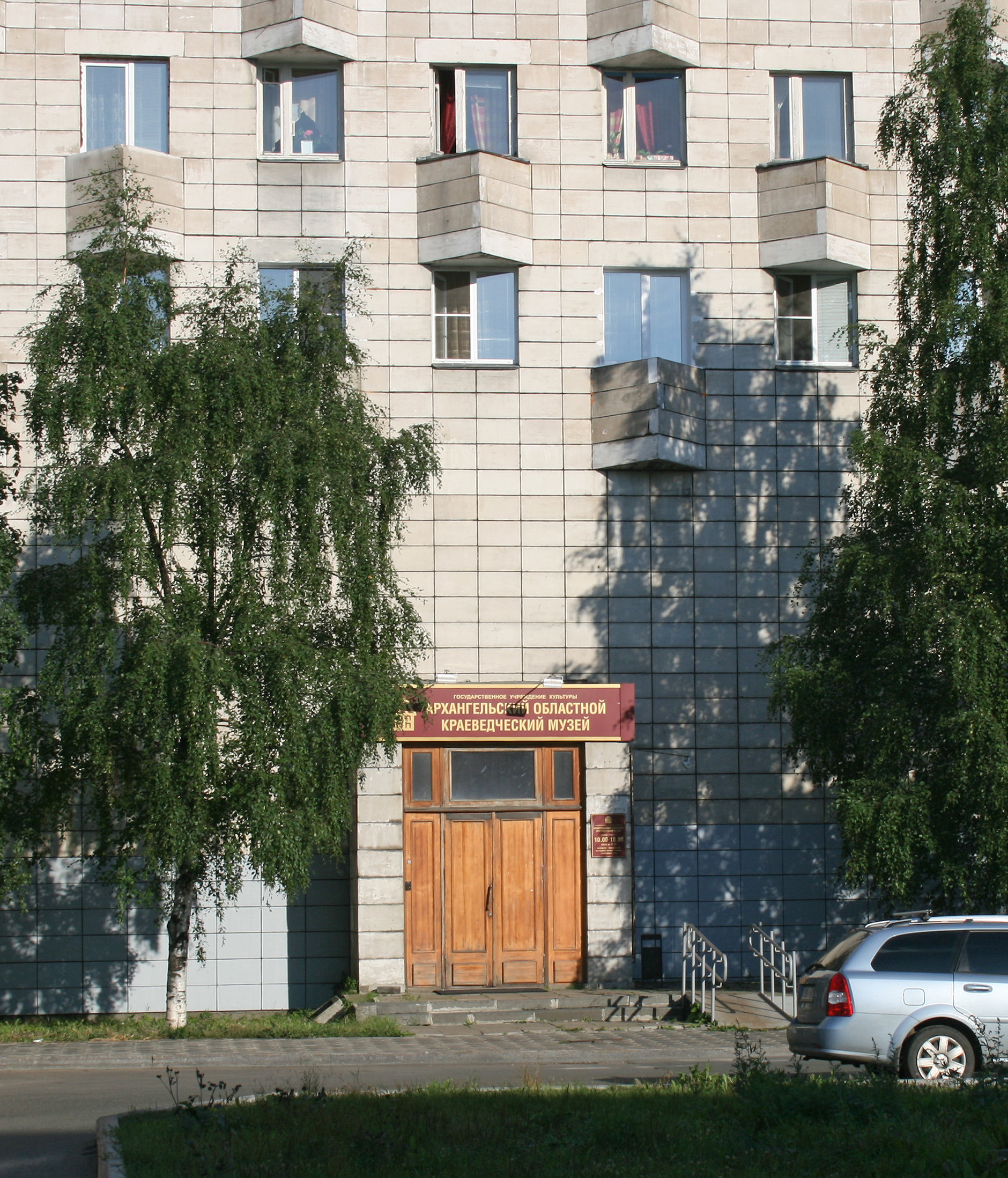
Arkhangelsk regional museum of local lore

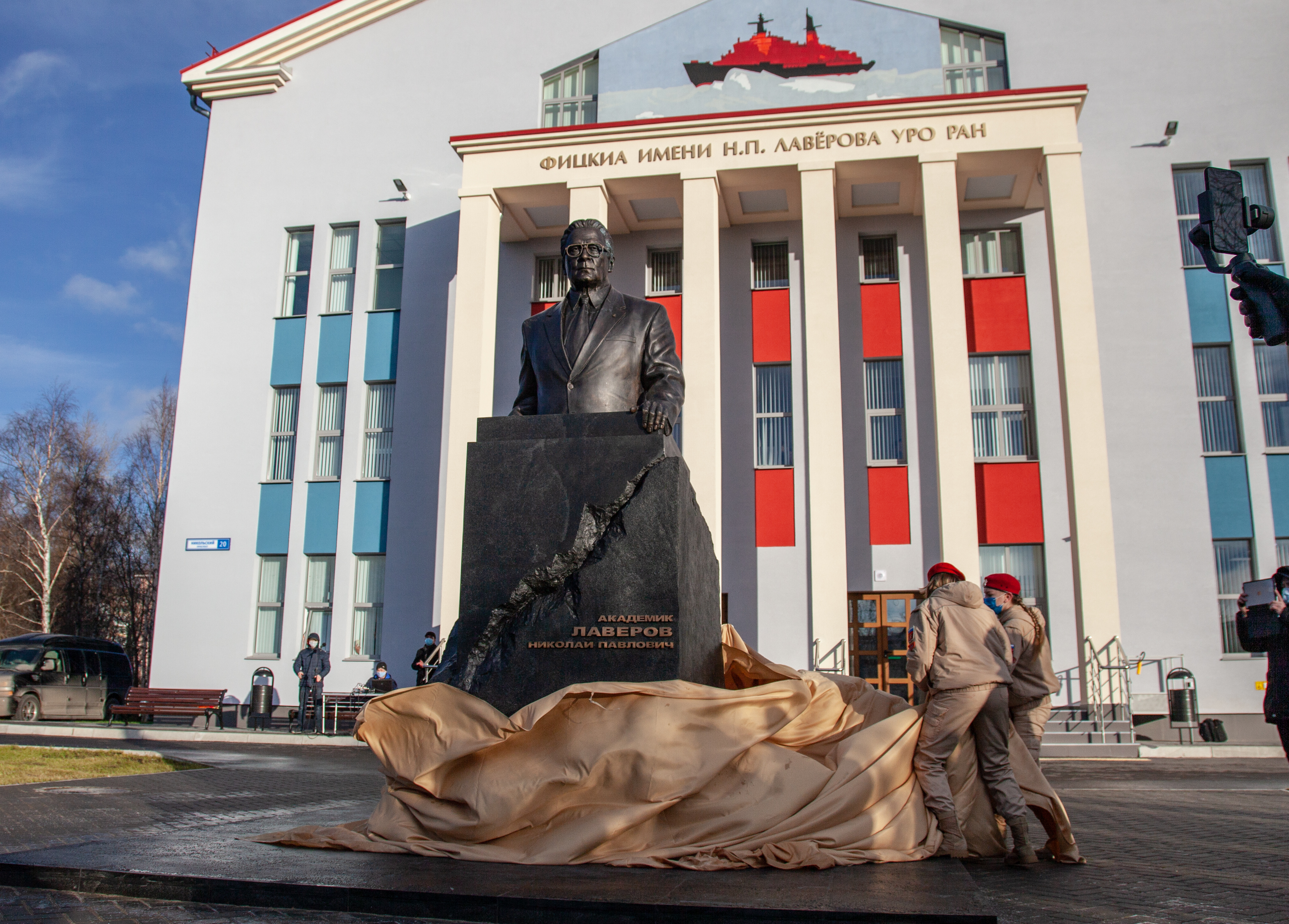
laboratory building of RAS

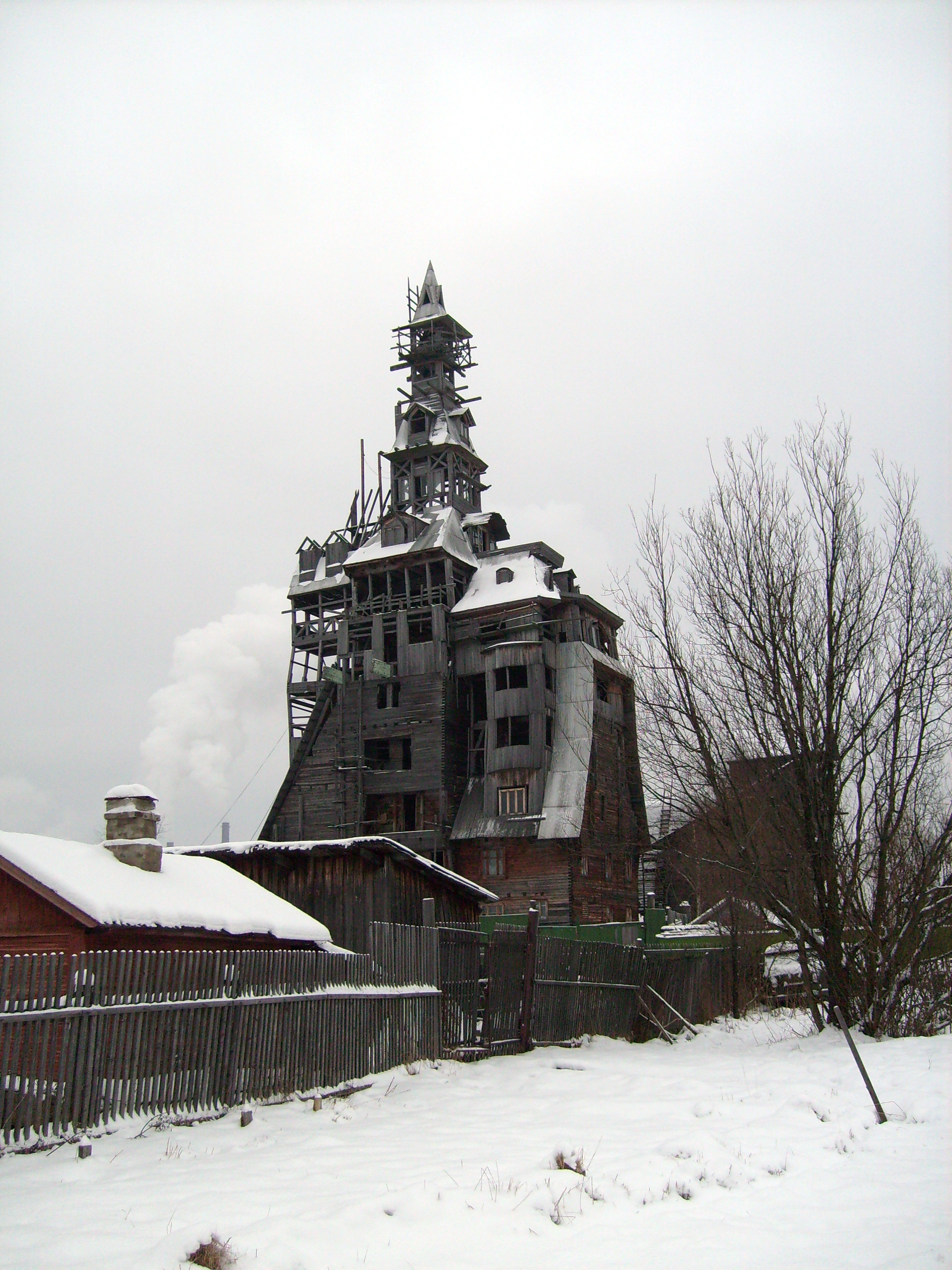
The Sutyagin House, claimed to be the world's tallest wooden single-family house

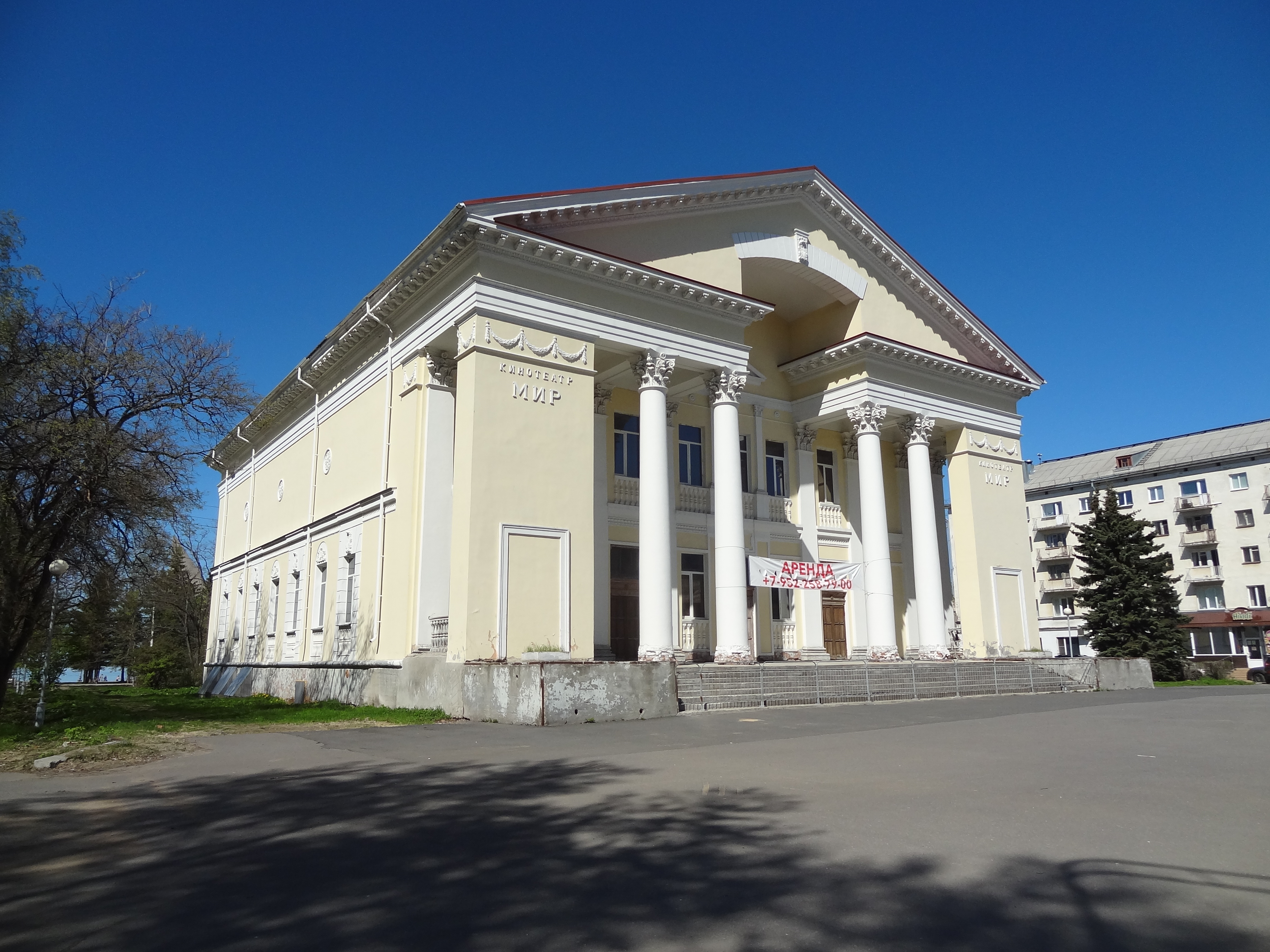
Mir Cinema

Mikhail Lomonosov came from a Pomor village near Kholmogory. A monument to him was installed to a design by Ivan Martos in 1829. A monument to Peter the Great was designed by Mark Antokolsky in 1872 and installed in 1914.

After its historic churches were destroyed during Joseph Stalin's rule, the city's main extant landmarks are the fort-like Merchant Yards (1668–1684) and the New Dvina Fortress (1701–1705). The Assumption Church on the Dvina embankment (1742–1744) was rebuilt in 2004.

In 2008, it was decided that the city's cathedral, dedicated to the Archangel Michael, which had been destroyed under the Soviets, would be rebuilt. The foundation stone was laid in November 2008 by the regional Bishop Tikhon. The cathedral, situated near the city's main bus station and river port, is expected to be completed and consecrated in 2019.

Another remarkable structure is the Arkhangelsk TV Mast, a 151-meter (495 ft) tall guyed mast for FM-/TV-broadcasting built in 1964. This tubular steel mast has six crossbars equipped with gangways, which run in two levels from the central mast structure out to each of the three guys. On these crossbars there are also several antennas installed.

An unusual example of local "vernacular architecture" was the so-called Sutyagin House. This thirteen-story, 44-metre (144 ft) tall residence of the local entrepreneur Nikolay Petrovich Sutyagin was reported to be the world's, or at least Russia's, tallest wooden house. Constructed by Sutyagin and his family over fifteen years (starting in 1992), without plans or a building permit, the structure deteriorated while Sutyagin spent a few years in prison on racketeering charges. In 2008, it was condemned by local authorities as a fire hazard, and the courts ordered it to be demolished by February 1, 2009. On December 26, 2008, the tower was pulled down, and the remainder of the building was dismantled manually by early February 2009.

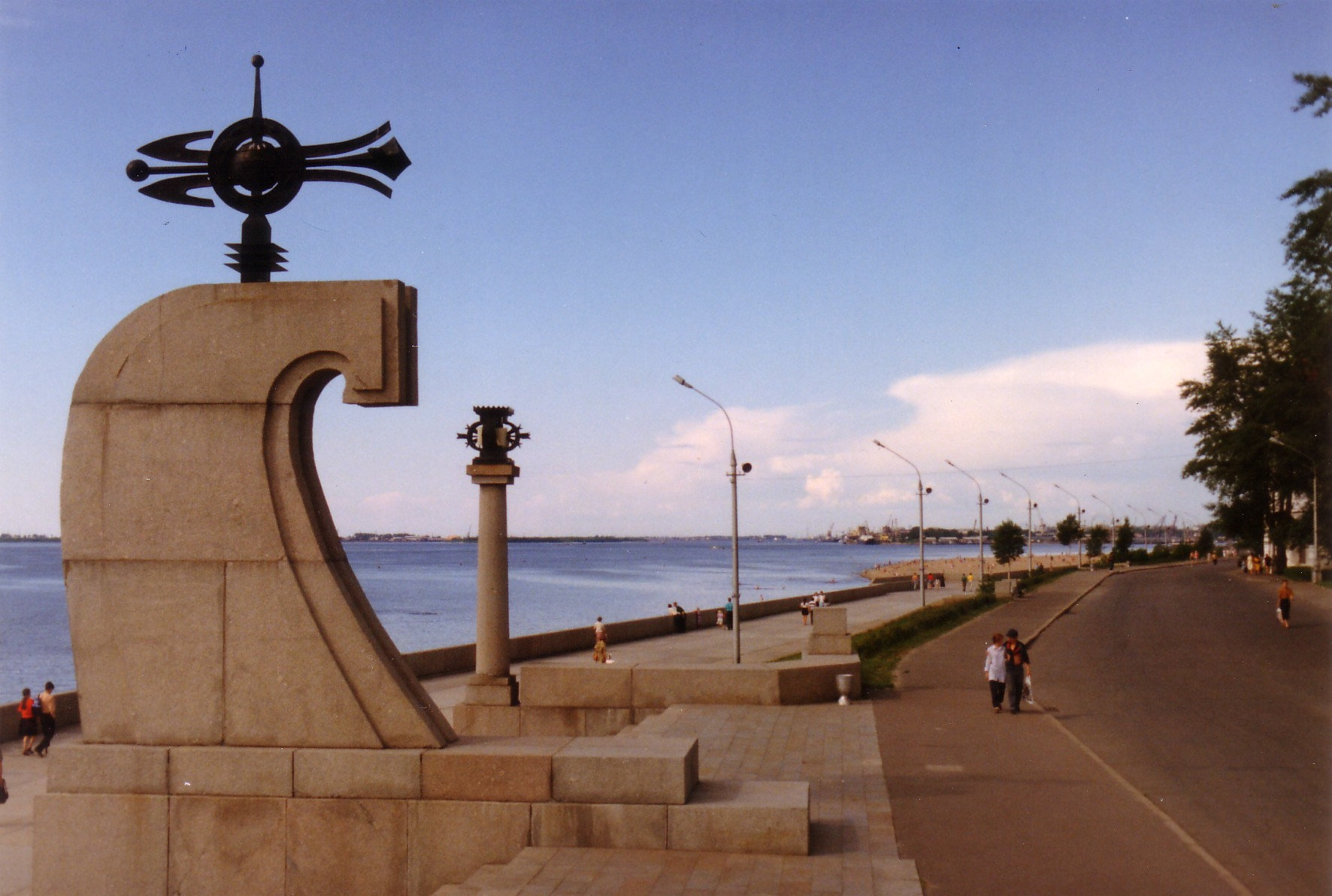
The promenade alongside River Dvina

The cultural life of Arkhangelsk includes:

- The Arkhangelsk Lomonosov Drama Theater
- Arkhangelsk Philarmonia
- Arkhangelsk Youth Theater
- Arkhangelsk Oblast Museum
- Arkhangelsk Art Museum
- Stepan Pisakhov Museum

An airstrip/dam/facility in Arkhangelsk was the fictional setting for a level in the 1997 hit videogame GoldenEye 007.

=== Literature ===
The Russian North, and, in particular, the area of Arkhangelsk, is notable for its folklore. Until the mid-20th century, fairy tales and bylinas were still performed on the daily basis by performers who became professionals. Starting from the 1890s, folkloric expeditions have been organized to the White Sea area and later to other areas of the Arkhangelsk Governorate in order to write down the tales and the bylinas, especially in Pomor dialects.

In the 1920s, mostly due to the efforts of Anna Astakhova, these expeditions became systematic. By the 1960s, the performing art was basically extinct. These folkloric motives and fairy tales inspired the literary works of Stepan Pisakhov and Boris Shergin, who were both natives of Arkhangelsk.

== Geography ==
=== Climate ===
Arkhangelsk experiences a subarctic climate (Köppen climate classification Dfc), with long (November–March), very cold winters and short (June–August), mildly warm summers. More extreme climates at this high latitude – such as Fairbanks, Alaska or Oymyakon, Sakha Republic – have much colder winters than Arkhangelsk, indicating that there is still significant moderation from the Atlantic Ocean.

Snowfall during winter is heavy, while summers are very rainy. Precipitation is very reliable year round.

Climate data for Arkhangelsk (1991–2020, extremes 1881–present)
Month	Jan	Feb	Mar	Apr	May	Jun	Jul	Aug	Sep	Oct	Nov	Dec	Year
Record high °C (°F)	5.0 (41.0)	5.2 (41.4)	12.3 (54.1)	25.3 (77.5)	32.1 (89.8)	33.0 (91.4)	34.4 (93.9)	33.4 (92.1)	27.7 (81.9)	18.3 (64.9)	10.0 (50.0)	5.8 (42.4)	34.4 (93.9)
Mean daily maximum °C (°F)	−8.4 (16.9)	−7.1 (19.2)	−1.1 (30.0)	5.6 (42.1)	13.1 (55.6)	18.7 (65.7)	22.1 (71.8)	18.6 (65.5)	12.8 (55.0)	5.0 (41.0)	−1.9 (28.6)	−5.3 (22.5)	6.0 (42.8)
Daily mean °C (°F)	−11.6 (11.1)	−10.7 (12.7)	−5.5 (22.1)	0.8 (33.4)	7.5 (45.5)	13.1 (55.6)	16.5 (61.7)	13.6 (56.5)	8.8 (47.8)	2.5 (36.5)	−4.2 (24.4)	−8.2 (17.2)	1.9 (35.4)
Mean daily minimum °C (°F)	−15.2 (4.6)	−14.4 (6.1)	−9.7 (14.5)	−3.4 (25.9)	2.5 (36.5)	7.7 (45.9)	11.5 (52.7)	9.3 (48.7)	5.6 (42.1)	0.4 (32.7)	−6.7 (19.9)	−11.3 (11.7)	−2.0 (28.4)
Record low °C (°F)	−45.2 (−49.4)	−41.2 (−42.2)	−37.1 (−34.8)	−27.3 (−17.1)	−13.7 (7.3)	−3.9 (25.0)	−0.5 (31.1)	−4.1 (24.6)	−7.5 (18.5)	−21.1 (−6.0)	−36.1 (−33.0)	−43.2 (−45.8)	−45.2 (−49.4)
Average precipitation mm (inches)	42 (1.7)	32 (1.3)	31 (1.2)	32 (1.3)	48 (1.9)	65 (2.6)	75 (3.0)	82 (3.2)	62 (2.4)	68 (2.7)	51 (2.0)	48 (1.9)	636 (25.0)
Average extreme snow depth cm (inches)	36 (14)	45 (18)	48 (19)	19 (7.5)	1 (0.4)	0 (0)	0 (0)	0 (0)	0 (0)	2 (0.8)	11 (4.3)	24 (9.4)	48 (19)
Average rainy days	2	2	4	10	17	17	18	19	22	19	9	4	143
Average snowy days	27	26	23	13	6	0	0	0	2	13	25	28	163
Average relative humidity (%)	85	84	80	72	68	69	75	81	85	88	89	87	80
Mean monthly sunshine hours	14.2	50.6	129.3	189.1	252.8	291.0	298.0	200.9	111.3	50.3	14.9	1.8	1,604.2
Source 1: Pogoda.ru.net
Source 2: NOAA

== Demographics ==
Historical population
Year	Pop.	±%
1897	20,400	—
1926	75,474	+270.0%
1939	284,570	+277.0%
1959	256,309	−9.9%
1970	342,590	+33.7%
1979	385,028	+12.4%
1989	415,921	+8.0%
2002	356,051	−14.4%
2010	348,783	−2.0%
2021	301,199	−13.6%
Source: Census Data

According to the 2021 Census, Arkhangelsk has a population of 301,199 people, which makes it the 68th largest city in Russia.

In the 2010 Census, the following ethnic groups were listed:

Ethnicity	Population	Percentage
Russians	330,656	94.19%
Ukrainians	4,404	1.25%
Belarusians	1,581	0.45%
Others	5,312	1.52%

== Sports ==
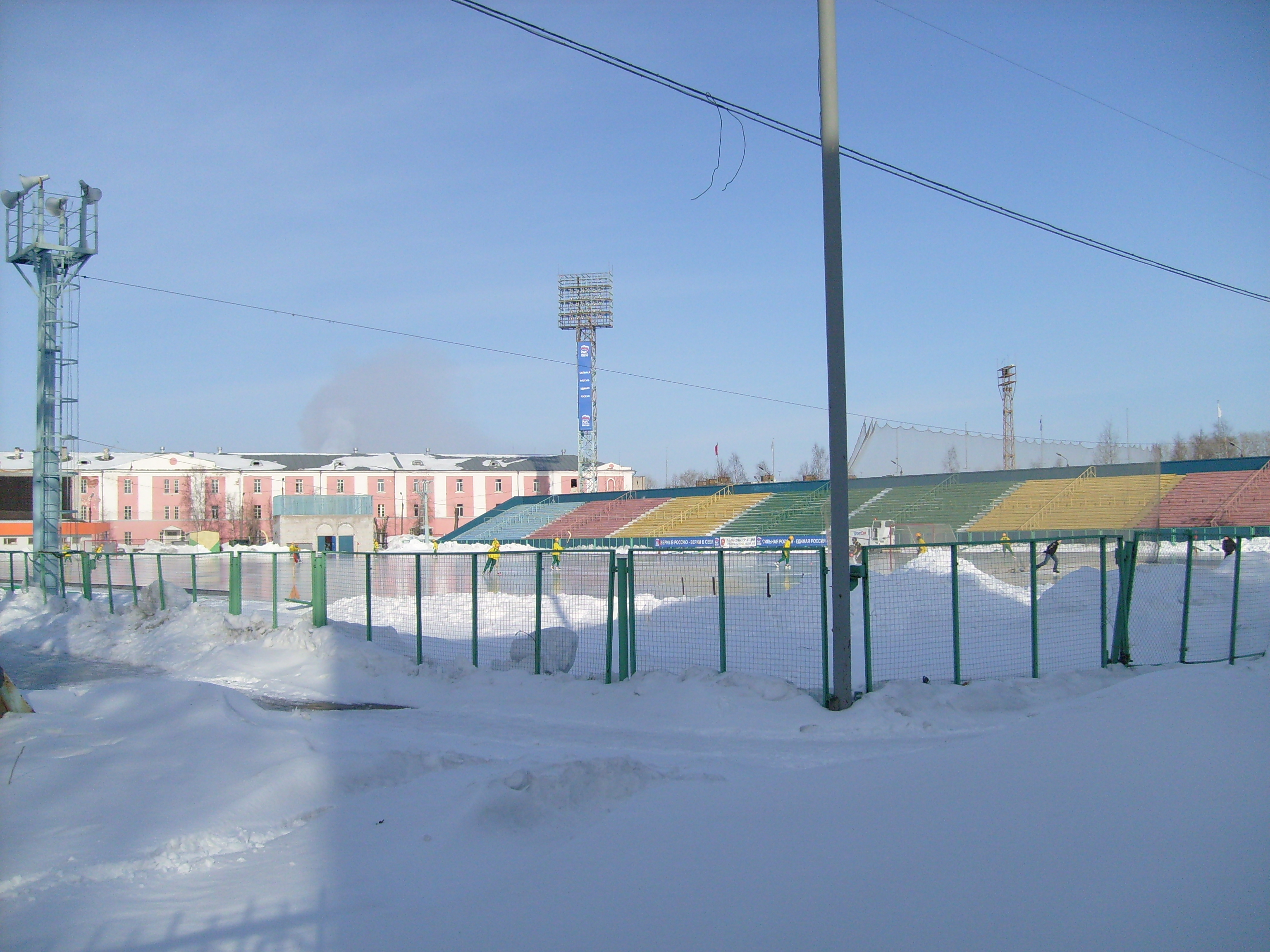
Vodnik's home stadium Trud, the arena for the final of the 2011–2012 season

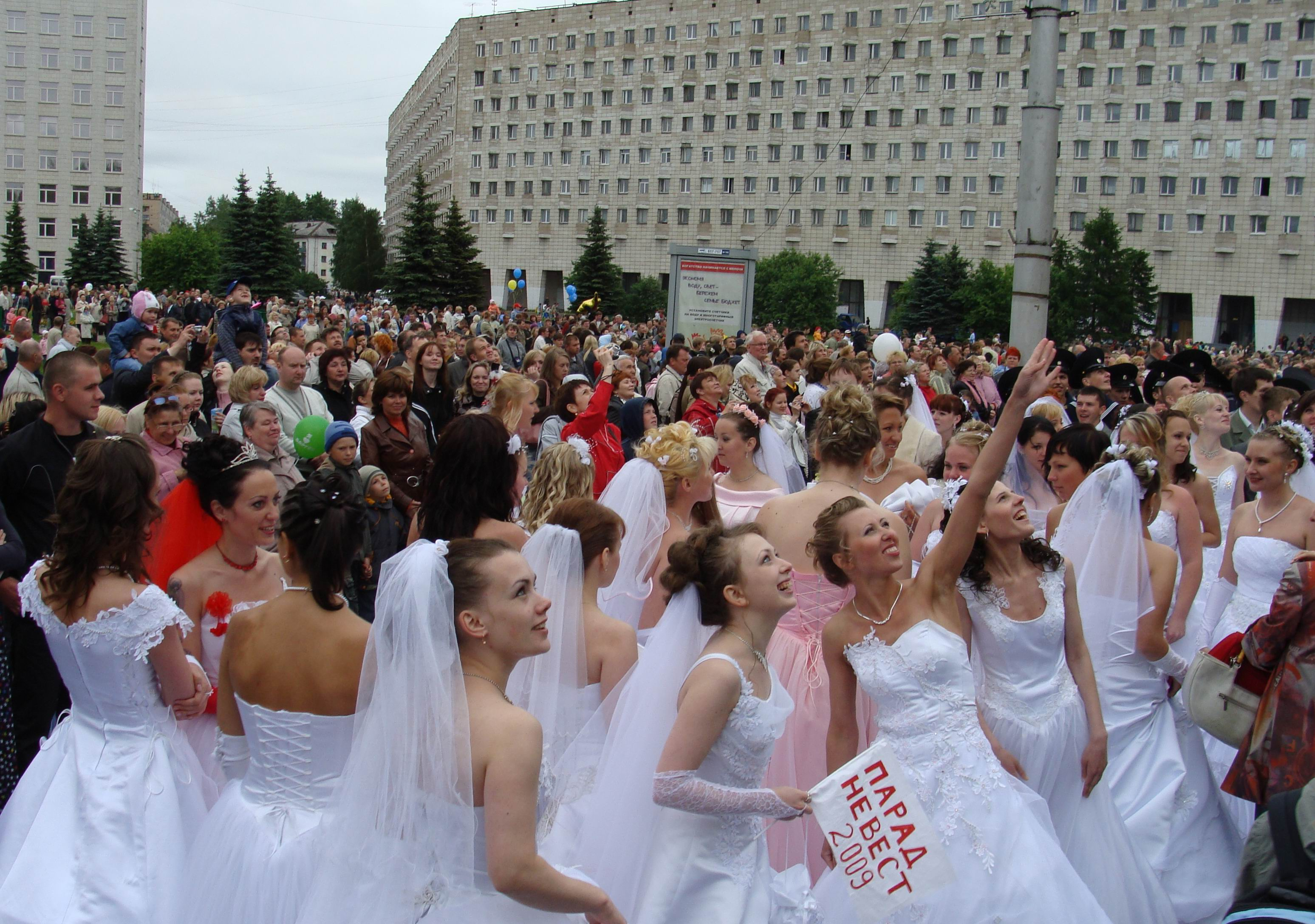
Women in bridal dress celebrate the 450th anniversary of the founding of Arkhangelsk

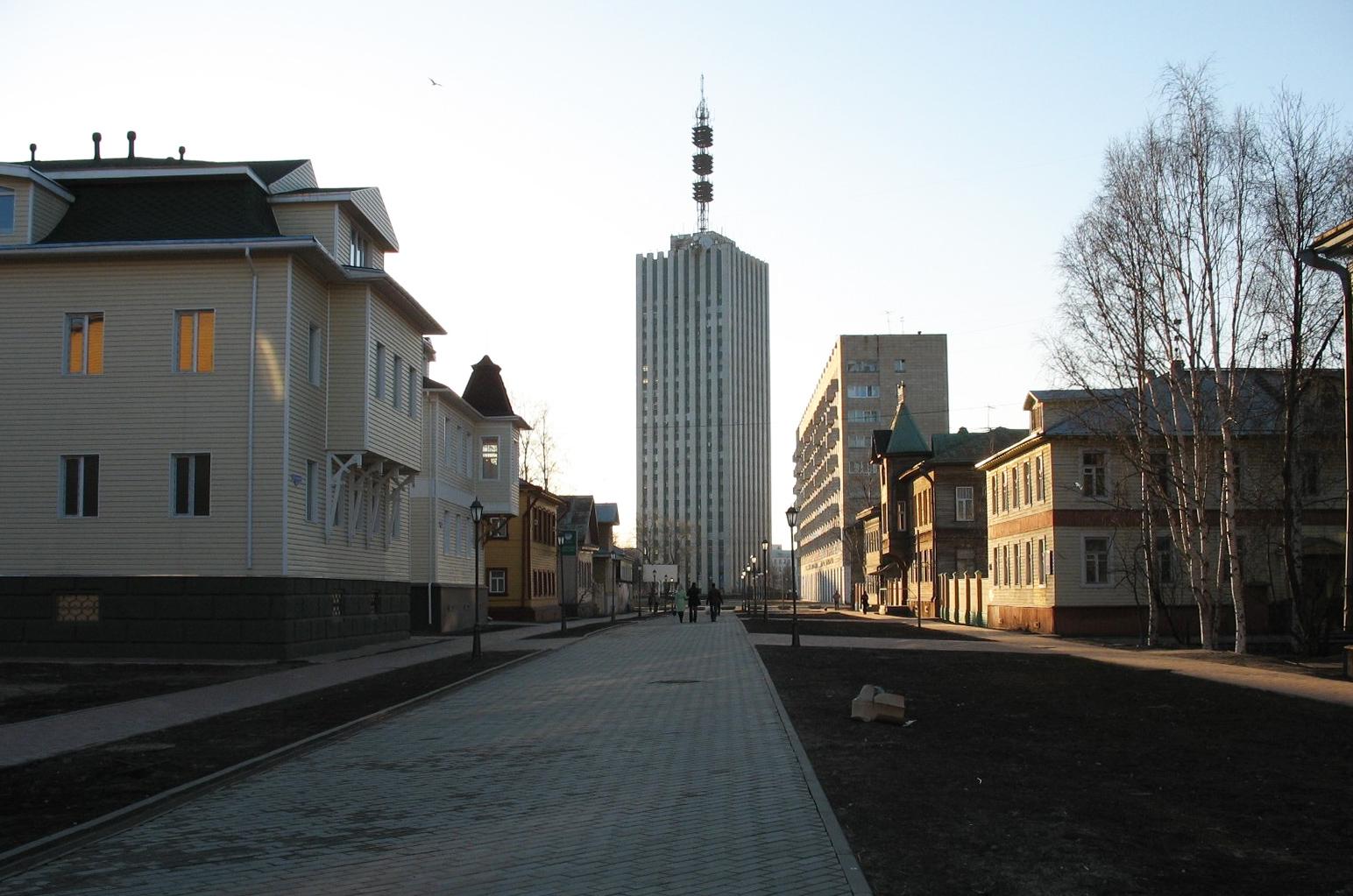
The tallest building in Arkhangelsk

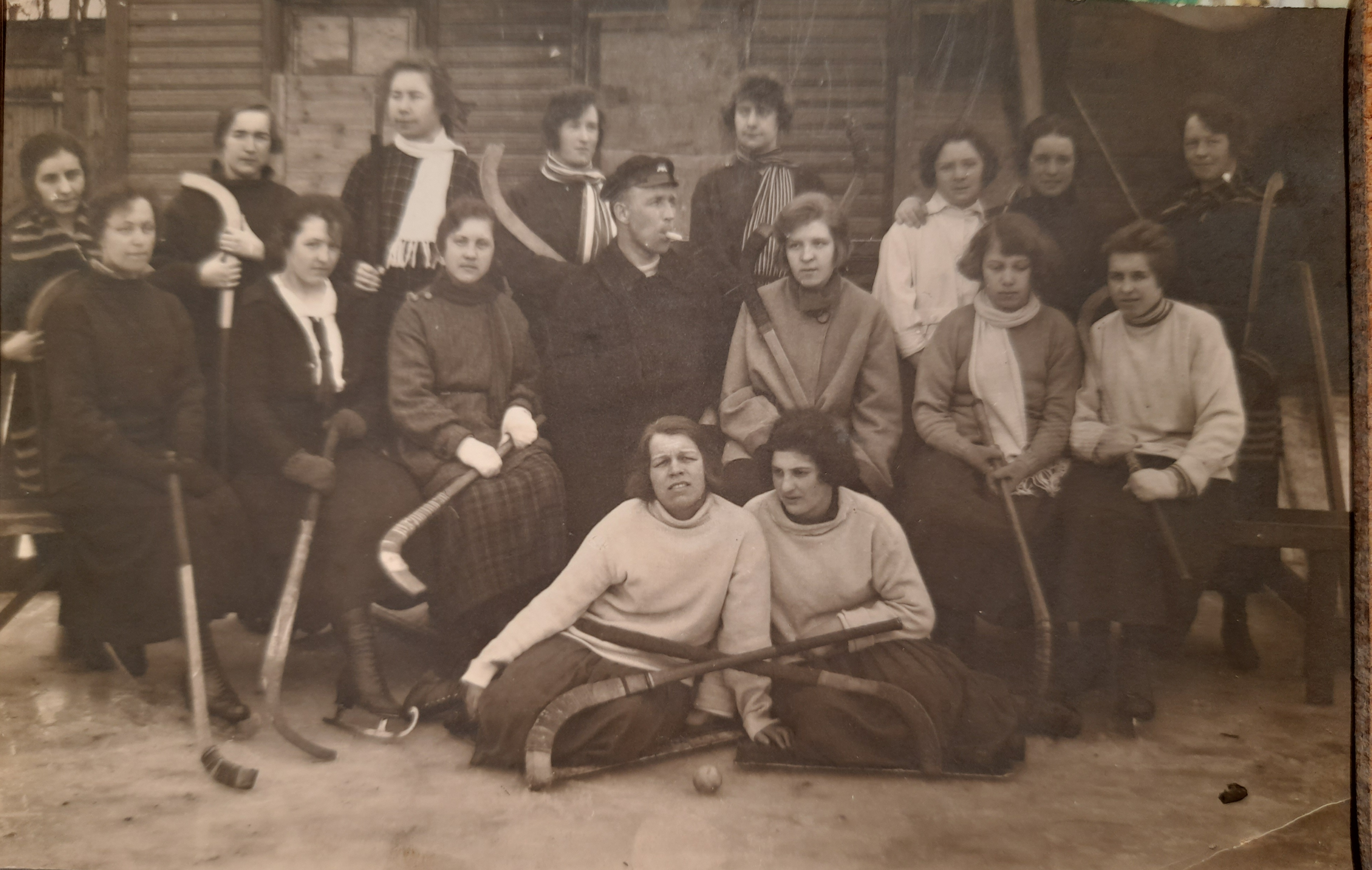
Women's bandy team and coach, Archangelsk, 1924

Bandy is the biggest sport in the city and is considered a national sport in Russia. Vodnik, the local team, plays in a 10,000 capacity home arena, and have won the Russian championships nine times (1996–2000 and 2002–2005). Arkhangelsk has hosted the Bandy World Championship twice, in 1999 and 2003. The 2011–2012 season Russian Bandy League final was played here on March 25, 2012. The 2016 Youth-17 Bandy World Championship was played in Arkhangelsk between January 28 and 31.

== Notable people ==
- Mikhail Lomonosov (1711–1765), Russian polymath
- Piter Poel (1760–1837), Dutch diplomat and publisher
- Johann Abraham Nüske (1796–1865), German-British guitarist and composer
- Ilya Shumov (1819–1881), Russian chess master and officer in the Russian Navy
- Wilhelm Greiffenhagen (1821–1890), Baltic German journalist and politician
- Eduard Schensnovich (1852–1911), Polish admiral in the Imperial Russian Navy
- Stepan Pisakhov (1879–1960), Russian and Soviet writer
- Stepan Balmashov (1882–1902), Russian student and assassin
- Boris Shergin (1896–1973), Russian and Soviet writer
- Władysław Pobóg-Malinowski (1899–1962), Polish soldier and historian
- Monja Danischewsky (1911–1994) British film producer
- Boris Lukoshkov (1922–1989), Russian painter
- Timur Gaidar (1926–1999), Soviet and Russian admiral
- Mikhail Kalik (1927–2017), Soviet and Israeli film director and screenwriter
- Vladimir Tarasov (born 1939), Russian percussionist and constellation artist
- Boris Skrynnik (1948–2025), President in Federation of International Bandy and Russian Bandy Federation
- Slava Polunin (born 1950), Russian clown
- Vladimir Malaniuk (1957–2017), Ukrainian chess player (GM)
- Mikhail Pletnev (born 1957), Russian pianist and conductor
- Alexander Dobrunov (1959–2006), Russian judo fighter
- Victor Ferin (born 1969), Russian actor and filmmaker
- Alexander Kravchenko (born 1971), Russian poker player
- Anatoli Tebloyev (born 1974), Russian football player
- Yuliya Fomenko (born 1979), Russian athlete (middle-distance runner)
- Illya Haliuza (born 1979), Ukrainian football player
- Sergei Bykov (born 1983), Russian basketball player
- Nadezhda Kosintseva (born 1985), Russian chess player (GM)
- Andrei Pervyshin (born 1985), Russian ice hockey player
- Tatiana Kosintseva (born 1986), Russian chess player (GM)
- Alex Gilbert (born 1992), Russian-born New Zealand adoption advocate

== Twin towns – sister cities ==
Arkhangelsk is twinned with:

- (Georgia (country)) Sukhumi, Georgia (2011)
- Ashdod, Israel (2012)
- Jermuk, Armenia (2018)

Former twin towns:

- Słupsk, Poland (1989–2022, terminated due to the Russian invasion of Ukraine)
- Tromsø, Norway (2011–2022)
- Oulu, Finland (1993–2022)
- Kiruna, Sweden (1999–2022)
- Emden, Germany (1989)(suspended)
- Portland, Maine, United States (1988)(discontinued)
- Vardø, Norway (1989)(suspended)
