= Crash Time: Autobahn Pursuit =

2007 video game

- Developer: Synetic
- Publishers: EU: RTL Playtainment; NA: Crave Entertainment
- Engine: 3D Landscape Engine
- Platforms: Microsoft Windows, Xbox 360
- Release: Windows: EU: 2 November 2007; Xbox 360: EU: 8 May 2008; NA: 5 August 2008
- Genre: Driving

Crash Time: Autobahn Pursuit (known in the United Kingdom as Crash Time and in the rest of Europe as Alarm für Cobra 11: Crash Time) is a mission-based driving game released for the PC in 2007 and Xbox 360 in 2008, and a sequel to Alarm für Cobra 11: Nitro. It is based on the German television series Alarm für Cobra 11 – Die Autobahnpolizei, and features several characters from the show working their way through criminal cases set in fictitious versions of the city streets of Cologne, and the autobahn in North Rhine-Westphalia. The developers created a "Pathfinder" to ensure that the AI vehicles do not always follow the same path during a pursuit. It was not received well by critics, with graphics and plot being of concern. Four sequels have been released on Xbox 360 and through online content provider Steam.

== Gameplay ==
Screenshot from the Xbox 360 version of Crash Time: Autobahn Pursuit

The player assumes the role of one of several officers in the fictional Cobra 11 team, from the television series Alarm für Cobra 11 – Die Autobahnpolizei, a police unit in Germany assigned to patrol the Autobahn and other road networks. The player usually takes the role of either Chris Ritter or Semir Gerkhan, but there is one early mission (Beginner's Luck) where the player takes the place of a contender. The officers are in charge with stopping and questioning suspects about various criminal activities. The game presents the player with a series of fictional "cases" that need to be solved to progress. The cases themselves are set in 2007.

== Development ==
The game was developed for the Xbox 360 by Synetic and published in North America by Crave Entertainment with a release date of 5 August, 2008. In Europe the game was published by RTL Playtainment, a subsidiary of RTL Television, and was released on 9 May, 2008. The PC version was released on 7 November 2007.

Using an improved version of the Crash Time: Autobahn Pursuit game engine developed for Mercedes-Benz World Racing, Synetic also developed a "pathfinder" system to allow AI controlled vehicles to choose their own route to a destination, so that no two pursuits are the same. According to Andreas Leicht, product manager at Synetic, creating the "pathfinder" system was the most difficult and time-consuming part of the development cycle. The scenery runs at a polygon count of 1,200,000 triangles per scene with a damage model based on physical impulses during a collision, in which the vertex basis is deformed. Also, visual damage to the animated model is triggered if the deformation exceeds specified limits, meaning that the cars not only deform but that parts can break and fall off.

City design for the game was based on real-life architecture using industrial buildings, inner-city districts and railway stations as models, although the game does not contain an entire real city. The development team sourced several thousand photos, texture DVDs as well as researching books and videos to obtain a "real" look for the cities.

== Reception ==
Crash Time: Autobahn Pursuit

Aggregate score
Aggregator	Score
Metacritic	44/100

Review scores
Publication	Score
Eurogamer	4/10
IGN	3.5
Official Xbox Magazine (UK)	40%
TGN	7/10
Xbox World	36%

The IGN Xbox Team rated Crash Time: Autobahn Pursuit as one of the five worst driving games on Xbox 360, mainly referring to the German police setting to the game, and the poor voice acting in the English-language versions. In a review for IGN by Ryan Geddes there was criticism that what could have been an exciting game has been reduced to the mundane. The difficulty curve was labelled "inconsistent", with "cakewalk levels being followed immediately by nearly impossible ones". The "Cases" mode was criticised as the player cannot tell how many missions are left until the case is completed, making the planning of a game session impossible. The missions have been described as boring and dull.

There was praise for the crashes, and it has been noted that the explosions are poor, but their resulting debris is a nice touch. There has been criticism that the vehicles in the game pop-up, which is emphasised by the speed at which the player is travelling.

== Sequels ==
=== Crash Time 2: Burning Wheels ===
On February 27, 2009, IGN reported that a sequel to Crash Time: Autobahn Pursuit is to be released for under the names Crash Time: Burning Wheels in Europe and Crash Time 2 in the United Kingdom. This game featured open world environments rather than the previous game's more linear levels. Crash Time 2 was released on Xbox 360 in Europe on 27 November 2008, and on Steam on 27 August 2009.

=== Crash Time 3: Highway Nights ===
At the 2009 Tokyo Game Show, the trailer for Crash Time III (known as Crash Time: Highway Nights in the US) premiered, This game features over 200 km of roads and over 32 km^{2} of playable environments, and the player has the chance to choose their own way to proceed through missions, for example instead of simply blocking off an opponent the player can choose to immobilise the vehicle in order to complete the mission. The story follows the pursuit and investigation into a terrorist unit. Crash Time 3 features night time missions for the first time in the series. A single player demo was released on Xbox Live Marketplace on 9 December 2009. Crash Time 3 was released on Steam on 25 November 2009, and on Xbox 360 in Europe on 27 November 2009. Also available on cloud-based gaming - Onlive

=== Crash Time 4: The Syndicate ===
Crash Time 4: The Syndicate was launched in 2010 featuring new gameplay and plot. Set in the city of Cologne, Crash Time 4 initially impressed with an Xbox 360 demo well received but was marred by negative critic reviews and a delayed-release date outside of Germany. This game is the best selling game in the series.

=== Crash Time 5: Undercover ===
Crash Time 5: Undercover was released in late 2012 as a sequel to Crash Time 4. The game featured the usage of power ups instead of guns and the drone. After Synetic went defunct in 2014, the game became extremely difficult to find, until the game was recently re-released by Unique Games on Steam in 2024. The re-release had different characters (being Nick and Markus instead of Semir and Ben), and the dialogue was mostly corrected.
