= Alarm for Cobra 11 – The Highway Police =

German television series

- Alarm für Cobra 11 vs. Grand Theft Auto
- Genre: Action; Crime drama Police procedural
- Starring: Johannes Brandrup; Rainer Strecker; Almut Eggert; Erdoğan Atalay; Mark Keller; René Steinke; Christian Oliver; Gedeon Burkhard; Tom Beck; Vinzenz Kiefer; Daniel Roesner; Katja Woywood; Katrin Heß; Niels Kurvin; Daniela Wutte; Pia Stutzenstein
- Composers: Reinhard Scheuregger; Klaus Garternicht; Nik Reich & Jaro Messerschmidt; Kay Skerra; Daniel Freundlieb; Frederik Wiedmann; Justin Burnett; Maximilian Nieberle
- Country of origin: Germany
- Original language: German
- No. of seasons: 28
- No. of episodes: 387 (list of episodes)

Production
- Running time: c. 45 minutes c. 90 minutes (pilot movies)
- Production companies: Action Concept Film- und Stuntproduktion GmbH; Polyphon Film- und Fernsehgesellschaft GmbH (seasons 1–3); RTL

Original release
- Network: RTL
- Release: March 12, 1996 – present

Alarm für Cobra 11 – Die Autobahnpolizei (German pronunciation: [aˈlaʁm fyːɐ̯ ˌkoːbʁaː ˈʔɛlf diː ˈʔaʊtobaːnpoliˌtsaɪ]; Alarm for Cobra 11 – The Highway Police) is a long-running, popular German television series about a two-man team of highway police (Autobahnpolizei), originally set in Berlin and since 1999 in the area of Cologne. The series is internationally distributed by 20th Television and has been broadcast in 120 countries worldwide.

The last regular episode "Das Team" aired on 12 August 2021. In an interview, main star Erdoğan Atalay blamed the stoppage on the COVID-19 pandemic. In 2022, the series returned in the form of 90-minute TV movies.

== Plot ==
The tasks of the Cobra 11 team consist primarily in solving crimes and catching the perpetrators. Typical elements of the action genre are mixed, so that there are regular car crashes, shootouts, explosions and fistfights. These action scenes are elaborately produced in most cases, and appropriately presented in a spectacular way. The high number of unrealistic scenes is a common criticism of the series; for example, large explosions often happen after small collisions while people emerge unharmed out of cars which have sustained catastrophic damage.

== Stunts ==
The series is known for its extremely well performed stuntwork, which features the destruction of various vehicles in every episode. Almost every episode has a distinct structure, with at least one daring action sequence and the pre-title sequence usually consisting of the main event (i.e. a devastating crash on the motorway, a high-speed run before a terrible conflagration, etc...). The stuntwork is often so spectacular that it would not look out of place in a full-fledged movie, with cars commonly reaching implausible heights as they vault through the air.

== Production locations ==
From 1996 to 1998, the series was produced jointly by Polyphon Film- und Fernsehgesellschaft GmbH (responsible for all other production aspects such as filming/postproduction/location scouting etc.) and ActionConcept (stunts). Those episodes were shot in Berlin, notably in the site of the former Checkpoint Bravo and in the surrounding state of Brandenburg. In 1998, Action Concept took over as the sole production company and shifted all filming/production work to its headquarters in Hürth just south of Cologne. Since then, episodes have been shot in and around Cologne and Düsseldorf as well as on several major Autobahnen (A540/A44 and now mainly on the Filmautobahn Aldenhoven near Düren) between Cologne and Düsseldorf in the state of North Rhine-Westphalia (NRW).

== Cast ==
=== Main ===
- Johannes Brandrup as Detective Chief Inspector Frank Stolte (main: season 1; guest: season 22)
- Rainer Strecker as Detective Chief Inspector Ingo Fischer (season 1)
- Erdoğan Atalay as Detective Chief Superintendent Semir Gerkhan
- Almut Eggert as Police Chief Katharina Lamprecht (main: season 1; recurring: season 2)
- Mark Keller as Detective Chief Inspector André Fux (main: seasons 2–4; guest: season 19)
- René Steinke as Detective Chief Inspector Tom Kranich (seasons 5–8, 10–12)
- Christian Oliver as Detective Inspector Jan Richter (seasons 9–10)
- Gedeon Burkhard as Detective Chief Inspector Chris Ritter (seasons 12–13)
- Tom Beck as Detective Chief Inspector Ben Jäger (main: seasons 14–19; guest: season 25)
- Vinzenz Kiefer as Detective Chief Inspector Alex Brandt (seasons 19–21)
- Daniel Roesner as Detective Chief Inspector Paul Renner (season 21–25)
- Katja Woywood as Police Chief Kim Krüger (main: season 21–25; recurring: seasons 14–25)
- Katrin Heß as Detective Sergeant Jenny Dorn (main: season 21–25; recurring: seasons 16–21)
- Niels Kurvin as CSU Hartmud Freund (main: season 21–25; recurring: seasons 9–21)
- Daniela Wutte as Secretary Susanne König (main: season 21–25; recurring: seasons 12–21)
- Pia Stutzenstein as Detective Inspector Vicky Reisinger (season 26–28)
- Patrick Kalupa as Police Chief Roman Kramer (season 26−28)
- Christopher Patten as Detective Marc Schaffrath (season 26−28)
- Gizem Emre as Dana Gerkhan (née Wegener), a police officer and Semir's illegitimate daughter (main: season 26–28; recurring: seasons 17, 20−25). Tesha Moon Krieg played her as a child in season 16.
- Nicolas Wolf as Officer Max Tauber (seasons 26−28)

=== Recurring ===
- Dietmar Huhn as Officer III Horst Herzberger (season 2–16). An older police officer and good friend of Semir's, until he was killed in the line of duty.
- Gottfried Vollmer as Officer III Dieter Bonrath (season 3–17). Horst's partner with a teenage son. Also killed in the line of duty.
- Carina Wiese as Andrea Gerkhan (née Schäfer). She was the precinct's secretary before becoming Semir's wife and the mother of his two younger daughters (season 2–14, 16–present).

== Episodes ==
Season	Episodes	Originally released	
Season	Episodes	First released	Last released
1	9	March 12, 1996	May 7, 1996
2	6	March 11, 1997	April 15, 1997
3	16	October 14, 1997	June 18, 1998
4	16	October 1, 1998	May 6, 1999
5	11	December 16, 1999	March 24, 2000
6	11	November 9, 2000	May 31, 2001
7	14	November 8, 2001	May 2, 2002
8	14	September 5, 2002	April 10, 2003
9	18	September 11, 2003	May 13, 2004
10	18	September 9, 2004	March 31, 2005
11	12	September 15, 2005	May 28, 2006
12	20	September 7, 2006	May 10, 2007
13	14	September 20, 2007	April 24, 2008
14	15	September 4, 2008	April 9, 2009
15	15	September 3, 2009	April 22, 2010
16	13	September 2, 2010	April 14, 2011
17	16	September 15, 2011	April 19, 2012
18	15	September 6, 2012	April 18, 2013
19	14	October 17, 2013	May 15, 2014
20	15	October 9, 2014	April 30, 2015
21	16	September 10, 2015	May 26, 2016
22	20	September 1, 2016	May 18, 2017
23	19	September 14, 2017	May 3, 2018
24	18	September 13, 2018	June 6, 2019
25	9	September 12, 2019	November 14, 2019
26	6	August 20, 2020	September 24, 2020
27	8	July 29, 2021	August 12, 2021
28	3	October 20, 2022	November 3, 2022

== Preamble ==
- The opening titles of the first 158 episodes (1996–2006) had the following preamble:

Ihr Revier ist die Autobahn (Their precinct is the motorway)
Ihr Tempo ist mörderisch (They work at break-neck speed)
Ihre Gegner: Autoschieber, Mörder und Erpresser (They're up against car thieves, killers, and extortionists)
Einsatz rund um die Uhr für die Männer von Cobra 11 (They're on call around the clock: the men of Cobra 11)
Unsere Sicherheit ist ihr Job (Our safety is their job).

- During episodes 159–243 (2007–2012), the preamble was:

Ihr Revier ist die Autobahn (Their precinct is the motorway)
Ihr Einsatz heißt: volles Tempo (Their mission: full speed)
Ihre Gegner von heute: extrem schnell und gefährlich (Their enemies today: extremely fast and dangerous)
Verbrechen ohne Limit – Jeder Einsatz volles Risiko (Crimes without limit – every job at full risk)
für die Männer von Cobra 11 (for the men of Cobra 11).

- With episode 244 (2013), the preamble became:

Ihr Revier ist die Autobahn. (Their precinct is the motorway)
Ihre Gegner: extrem schnell und gefährlich. (Their enemies: Extremely quick and dangerous)
Verbrechen ohne Limit. (Crimes without limit)
Jeder Einsatz – volles Risiko (Every job: at full risk)
für die Männer von Cobra 11. (for the men of Cobra 11)

- From 2014 to 2019, the preamble was:

Ihr Revier ist die Autobahn. (Their precinct is the motorway)
Ihre Gegner: extrem schnell und gefährlich. (Their enemies: Extremely quick and dangerous)
Volles Risiko (Extremely risky)
für die Männer von Cobra 11. (for the men of Cobra 11)

Episodes 365 to 381 feature an all-new variation of the theme song, but lack any opening preamble.

== Legacy ==
=== Game adaptations ===
The series has also spawned numerous game releases in Europe, primarily for PC, but they have generally met with mixed receptions. The latest title is Crash Time 5: Undercover. Crash Time was also dubbed into English and sold in many other markets worldwide.

Release	German Titel	International Title	Plattform	Publisher
9. November 2000	Alarm für Cobra 11: Das Spiel zur RTL-Erfolgsserie		PC	VCC Entertainment GmbH & Co KG, THQ Entertainment
9. April 2001	Alarm für Cobra 11: Director’s Cut (Remastered)		PC	VCC Entertainment GmbH & Co KG, THQ Entertainment
25. November 2003	Alarm für Cobra 11: Teil 2		PC, PlayStation 2	Davilex, THQ Entertainment
26. November 2004	Alarm für Cobra 11: Vol. 2	Alarm for Cobra 11: Hot Pursuit	PC, PlayStation 2	Davilex, rondomedia GmbH, NBG EDV Handels & Verlags GmbH & Co KG
22. November 2005	Alarm für Cobra 11: Vol. 3		PC	exozet games, Provox Multimedia, RTL Playtainment
2. November 2006	Alarm für Cobra 11: Nitro	Alarm for Cobra 11: Nitro	PC	Synetic, RTL Enterprises
2. November 2007	Alarm für Cobra 11: Crash Time	Crash Time: Autobahn Pursuit	PC, Xbox 360	Synetic, RTL Playtainment
27. November 2008	Alarm für Cobra 11: Burning Wheels	Crash Time II: Burning Wheels	PC, Xbox 360	Synetic, RTL Playtainment
19. November 2009	Alarm für Cobra 11: Highway Nights	Crash Time III: Highway Nights	PC, Xbox 360	Synetic, dtp entertainment
26. November 2010	Alarm für Cobra 11: Das Syndikat	Crash Time IV: The Syndicate	PC, PS3, Xbox 360	Synetic, dtp entertainment
6. Dezember 2011	Alarm für Cobra 11 3D	Crash Time 3D	3DS	Synetic, dtp entertainment
28. September 2012	Alarm für Cobra 11: Undercover	Crash Time V: Undercover	PC, PS3, Xbox 360	Synetic, dtp entertainment

=== Spin-off ===
In 2002, a spin-off named Alarm für Cobra 11 – Einsatz für Team 2 (Alarm for Cobra 11 – Team Mission 2) was started. Because of its limited success, only two seasons were produced.

=== Parodies ===
- Alarm für Cobra 11 – Die Autobahnpolizei was regularly parodied as "Alarm für Kebap 11 – Die Dönerpölizei" by Freitag Nacht News, a German comedy sketch program. The segments feature the team talking in exaggerated Turkish accents and many references to Döner Kebab. Erdoğan Atalay and René Steinke themselves have made cameo appearances in some episodes.
- The series has also been parodied on Switch TV and Switch reloaded.
- Alarm für Cobra 11 – Die Autobahnpolizei was also parodied in the Latvian comedy show Savādi gan.

=== World's Wildest Police Videos ===
Some of the clips from season 1 to season 5 were used as crash test footage in the American reality television show World's Wildest Police Videos, alongside Der Clown and one crash from Die Wache.
