= PGO (automobile) =

French car manufacturer

PGO Automobiles SA
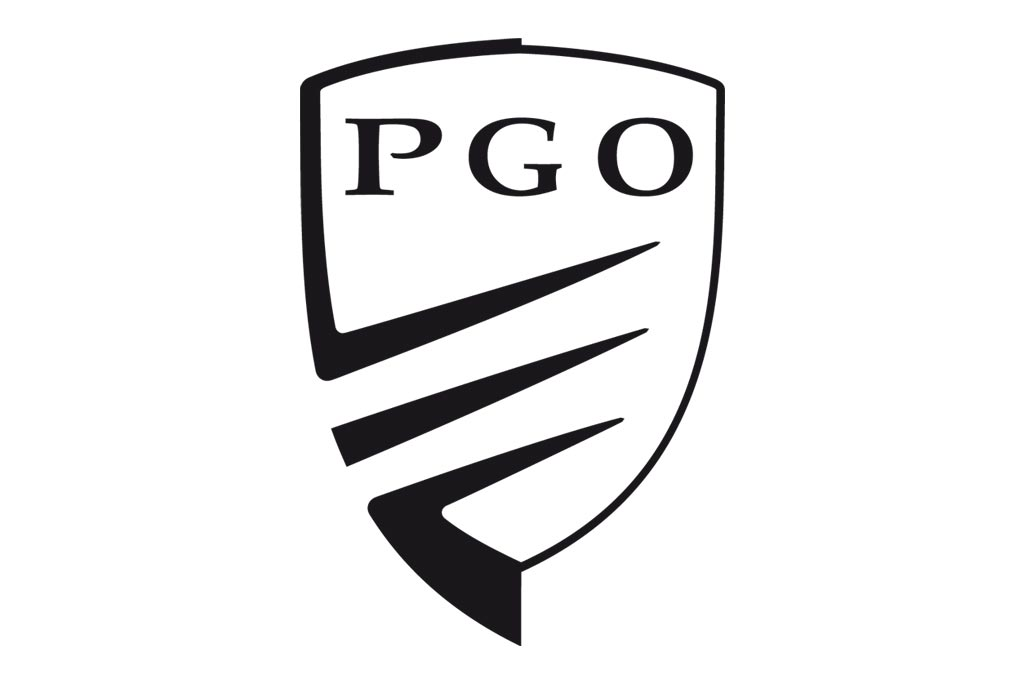
- Company type: Public
- Industry: Automotive
- Founded: 1985; 41 years ago
- Founders: Gilles and Olivier Prevot
- Headquarters: Saint-Christol-lès-Alès, France
- Key people: Mohamed Zouhir Boudemagh (CEO)
- Products: Sports cars
- Website: English homepage

PGO Automobiles is a French car manufacturer, producing exclusive series' of sports cars. The brand operates in the same special market as Wiesmann, and Donkervoort. Their cars are considered an appropriate solution for connoisseurs seeking individuality and style.

The French brand was launched in 1980 by three avid automobile fans: the brothers Patrick, Gilles and Olivier Prévôt whose initials formed the brand name: PGO

PGO began production by manufacturing replicas but soon moved on to substantiating their own designs into full-scale vehicles.

The first of these was the Speedster II, this was a two-seater sports car in a retro-style but with a modern specification. It was first seen at the 2000 Paris Motor Show.

By 2005 51% of the company had been purchased by subsidiaries of the Al-Sayer Group, whose financial support allowed increased product research and development and resulted in the Cévennes roadster. The Cévennes was notably featured in the video game World Racing 2.

At the 2008 Paris Motor Show, a new model was launched called the Hemera.

== Models ==
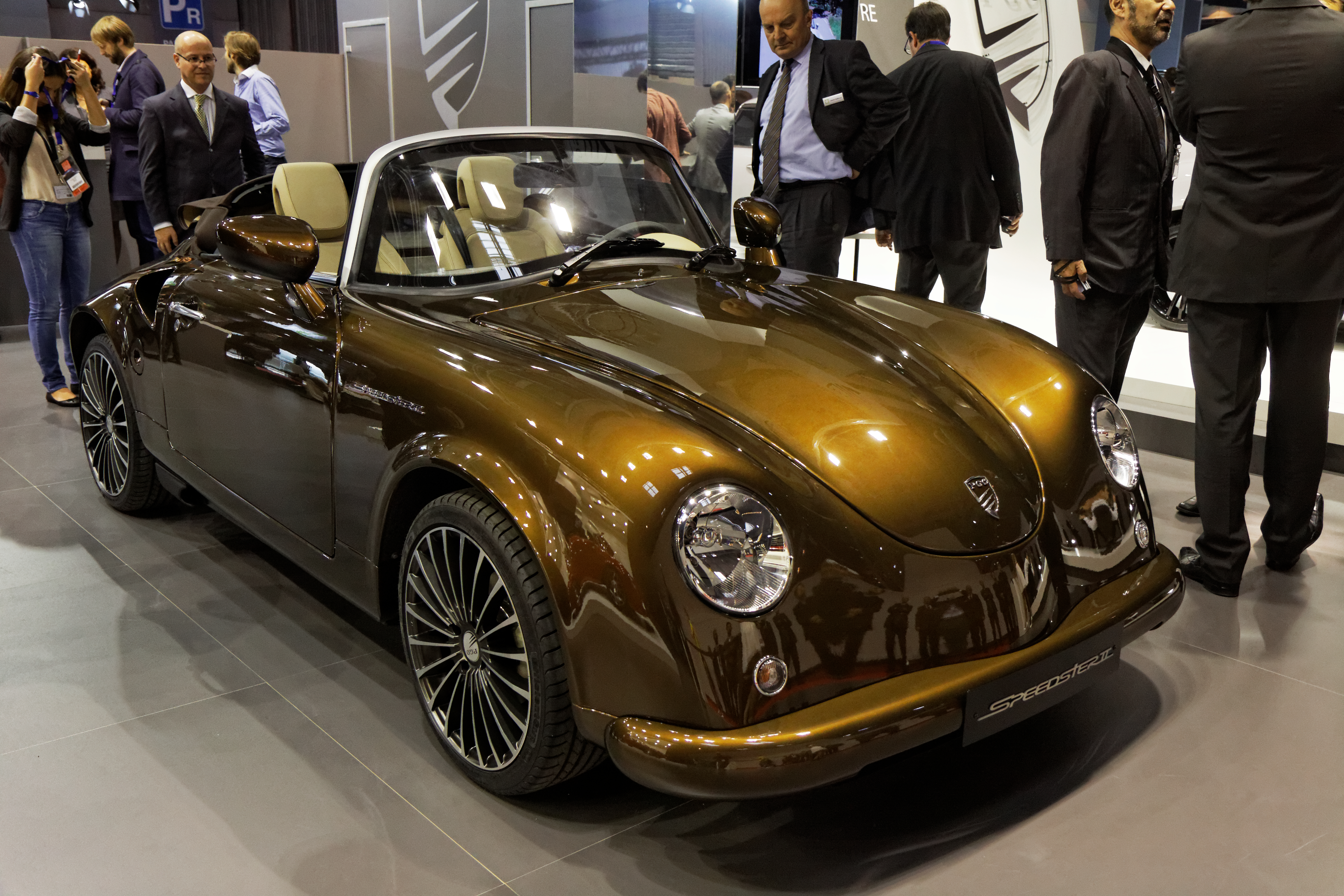
PGO Speedster II

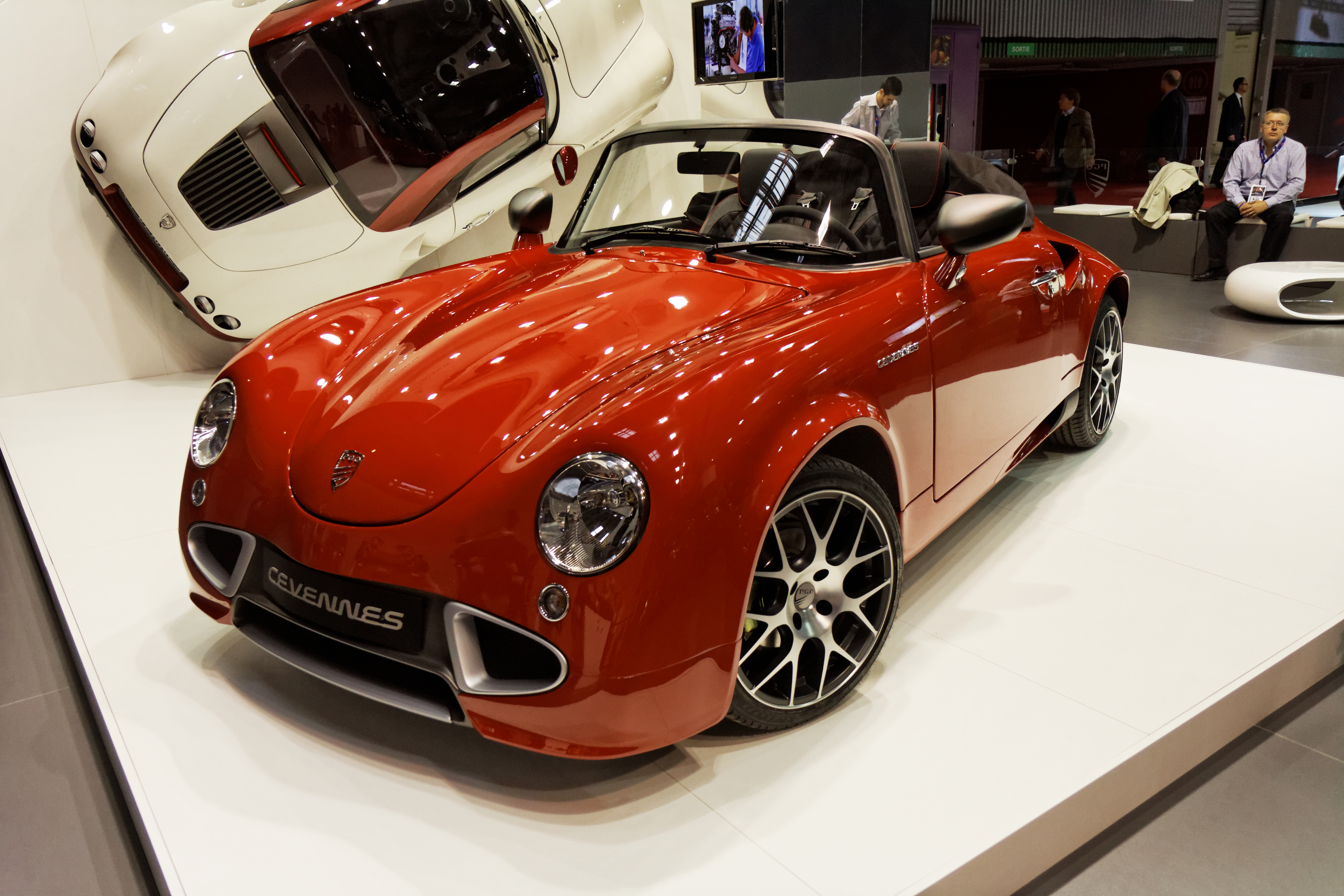
PGO Cévennes

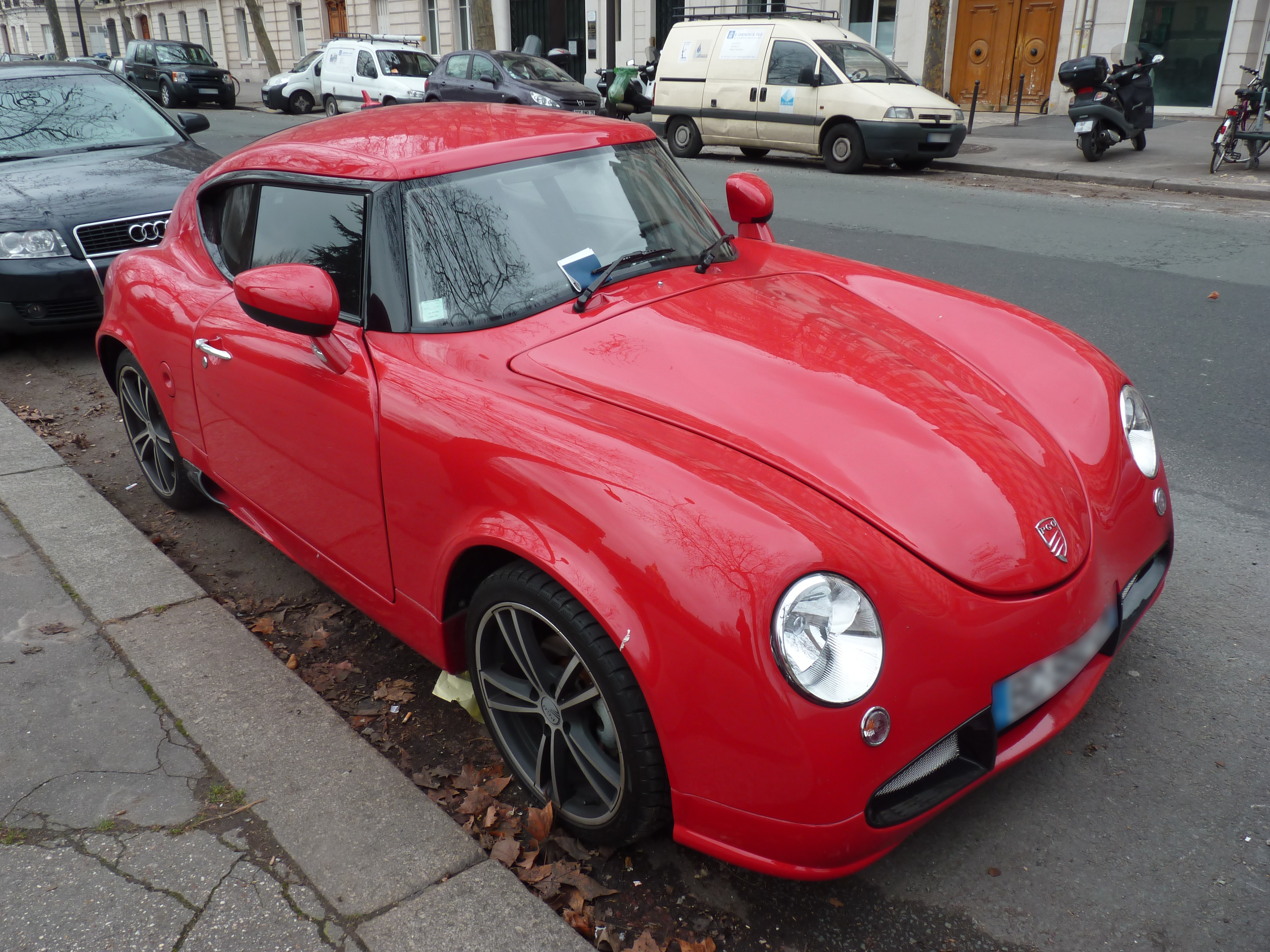
PGO Hemera
