= Have a N.I.C.E. Day! =

1997 video game

- Developer: Synetic
- Publisher: Magic Bytes
- Platform: Windows
- Release: 1997
- Genre: Racing
- Modes: Single-player, multiplayer

Have a N.I.C.E. Day! (alternatively titled in France as Axelerator: Have a N.I.C.E. Day!) is a 1997 video game developed by Synetic and published by Magic Bytes for Microsoft Windows. It is a vehicular combat racing video game. Upon release, the game received average reviews, with critics praising the game's action gameplay, pacing and upgrades, and critiquing the audio and track design. A sequel, N.I.C.E. 2, was released in 1998.

== Gameplay ==
Gameplay screenshot

Players compete in races and use weapons to engage in combat with other racers. In the Championship mode, race requires the player to complete five laps. Players can upgrade their car's armor, brakes, chassis, and tires, and attach and upgrade weapons such as machine guns and rockets, or projectiles such as mines or oil to disrupt other racers. Cars feature a damage model measured by an indicator. Players progress across stages and earn money from points awarded by placing in the top six finish positions. The game features 12 themed tracks representing world locations, such as Egypt, South America, Chicago, the Wild West and China, with alternate day and night versions of tracks. Have a N.I.C.E. Day! also supports with online multiplayer using direct link or network for up to eight players.

== Development ==
Have a N.I.C.E. Day! was developed by Synetic, a German studio that released several games in the racing video game genre. The studio was formed in 1996 by former employees of Ascaron. The development team wanted to create "the fastest engine on the market" for a racing title, and placed emphasis on developing the game's online multiplayer.

== Reception ==
Reception

Review scores
Publication	Score
G4	3/6
Joystick	69%
PC Games (DE)	87%
PC Jeux	79%
PC Joker	75%

PC Games praised the game's graphics, controls and artificial intelligence, finding it to be a worthy successor in the vehicular combat genre. Describing the game as "well-animated and fast enough to give a real sense of speed", Generation 4 found the game fun, but considered the tracks were too long and repetitive, a criticism also repeated by PC Jeux. Joystick felt the game was satisfying to play but lacked innovation, writing that the game's visuals were "hardly exceptional" and the sound effects were repetitive. Writing that the game was a "combat-heavy, action-packed" title with "surprisingly fast" graphics, PC Joker enjoyed the game, but felt the music was mediocre and the handling was sensitive and more appropriate for an arcade racing game. PC Games retrospectively stated that the game series deserved a sequel, praising Have A N.I.C.E. Day! for its "imaginative gimmicks" and weapons.
