= Magic Bytes =

German video game publisher

- Type: Product brand
- Industry: Software development industry Video game industry
- Founded: 1987
- Founder: Thomas Meiertoberens
- Key people: Rolf Lakämper, Bettina Wiedner
- Website: www.magicbytes.com

Magic Bytes is an international video game publishing label. It originated in Germany as the primary computer game brand of micro-partner Software GmbH, already active since 1986 and dedicated to the internal development of some of the games. Initially, Bertelsmann subsidiary Ariolasoft and Gremlin Graphics in the United Kingdom distributed most Magic Bytes games.

== History ==
Micro-Partner was founded by Thomas Meiertoberens, coming from Rainbow Arts of which he was co-founder, in 1986 in Gütersloh, Germany. At that time the initial team was formed by the owner Meiertoberens, the programmer Rolf Lakämper and the graphic designer Bettina Wiedner, all three in their twenties, and made itself known with the success of Mission Elevator, published in different countries of the world, the first German video game to have notable international success. In 1986, Meiertoberens obtained licenses to produce and market video games in Europe of comic characters Clever & Smart, Pink Panther and Tom & Jerry. The Magic Bytes brand was created in 1987 and was subsequently used to publish almost all micro-partner's games. Magic Bytes debut took place in 1987 with the European release of Western Games and Clever & Smart. Most games were adapted for Amstrad CPC, Atari ST, Commodore C64 & Amiga, some for MSX, ZX Spectrum and later mostly for PC's.

On May 20, 1988, Meiertoberens founded an US counterpart, Magic Bytes USA Inc., in Tampa and agreed with US company Digitek, also in Tampa, to mutually publish the other company's titles on their continent and micro-partner published Digitek games in Europe under the Magic Bytes label.

In 1991, micro-partner ceased operations due to non-payment of some of their wholesalers and publishing rights for Magic Bytes games changed to Magic Bytes Verlag R. Kleinegräber in German speaking countries and Magic Bytes Verlag started selling video games directly to end-users by mail-order or to Karstadt department stores. Magic Bytes Verlag started publishing video games from external German game developers and had notable success in Germany with BIING from reLINE in 1993 and Have a N.I.C.E. day from Synetic in 1997. In 2000, the last Magic Bytes game was released for that time period.

In 2017, Thomas Meiertoberens, who in the meantime had moved to the United States in 1997 to manage a real estate company, brought the brand back into business by founding Magic Bytes LLC, of which he is CEO. The new US company, headquartered in Lewes and operating with representatives in Orlando and Bielefeld, Germany, is developing an Android game called Toonworld of which an early access version has been released in February 2021.

== Games ==
Year	Game	Genre
1987	Western Games	Sport
1987	Clever & Smart	Action-Adventure
1988	Powerstyx	Strategy
1988	Minigolf	Sport
1988	Pink Panther	Action-Adventure
1988	Vampire's Empire	Action-Adventure
1989	Beam	Action
1989	Blue Angel 69	Puzzle
1989	Eskimo Games	Sport
1989	Nightdawn	Action
1989	Tom & Jerry	Action
1989	Wall$treet	Educational
1990	Air Supply	Action
1990	Big Business	Business Simulation
1990	Domination	Action-Adventure
1990	USS John Young	Simulation
1990	North Sea Inferno	Action-Adventure
1990	Cyberworld	Action-Adventure
1991	Dino Wars	Action-Strategy
1991	The Second World	Adventure
1992	Dynatech	Economy Simulation
1992	Elysium	Economy Simulation
1993	Penthouse Hot Numbers	Puzzle
1995	Biing!	Economy Simulation
1996	Abenteuer Weltraum	Educational
1997	Have a N.I.C.E. Day!	Racing
1997	Drilling Billy	Action
1998	N.I.C.E. 2	Racing
1998	Rent-a-Hero	Fantasy
1999	Biing! 2	Economy Simulation
1999	Dark Secrets of Africa	Action-Adventure
2000	Crystal Hammer	Action
