= Dino Wars =

1990 video game

- Developers: DigiTek Software (Amiga); Off The Wall Productions (DOS); James C. Hilty (C64)
- Publishers: NA: DigiTek Software; EU: Magic Bytes
- Designers: Art V. Cestaro III; Scott R. Lahteine
- Platforms: Amiga, MS-DOS, Commodore 64
- Release: 1990
- Genres: Strategy, action
- Modes: Single-player, multiplayer

Dino Wars is a 1990 video game developed and published by DigiTek Software for the Amiga. It was ported to the MS-DOS and Commodore 64.

== Gameplay ==
Strategy portion of the game (Amiga)

Dino Wars is a strategy game where the objective is to either capture the egg from the opposing side or to eliminate all units from the opponent army. The game can be played against the computer or another human. There are five environments available: desert, jungle, river, volcanic, and chess. Each side consists of 17 dinosaurs (9 in the Commodore 64 version). There are eight different dinosaurs, each having different statistics that affect their combat ability (e.g. strength, agility, armor). The units move on a grid and when two units occupy the same grid space, a battle occurs on a separate screen. The battle is depicted as a one-on-one fighting game, each dinosaur has a health meter which needs to be depleted in order to win the fight. The battle mode can be played on its own without the strategy part. The game also includes an encyclopedia which contains educational information about dinosaurs and related concepts.

== Reception ==
Reception

Review scores
Publication	Score
Aktueller Software Markt	10/12
Amiga Action	70%
Amiga Power	45%
Joystick	55%
Tilt	12/20
VideoGames & Computer Entertainment	8/10
Amiga Joker	87%
Datormagazin	73%
Micro News	5/5
Power Play	39% (Amiga); 8% (C64)

Computer Gaming World compared the game to Archon (1983) and Beast War (1985). They liked the graphics but disliked the game mechanics in both action and strategy phases. VideoGames & Computer Entertainment called the graphics and sound "excellent" and it was noted as "the best dinosaur game ever". Amiga Action called the gameplay poor and said the game is aimed more for younger people than the hardcore gamers. Amiga Power said the action part has too few moves available and called the game design too simplistic.
