= Dark Secrets of Africa =

1999 video game by New Generation Software

- Developer: New Generation Software
- Publisher: Magic Bytes
- Platform: Windows
- Release: 18 August 1999
- Genre: Action
- Mode: Single-player

Dark Secrets of Africa is a 1999 action video game developed by German studio New Generation Software and published by Magic Bytes for Windows. It was released on 18 August 1999.

The game sees historian Howard Hawk join Marduk and the followers of Anubis in their fight against followers of Azag-Thot.
