= Wall$treet =

1989 video game

- Developer: Holger Krause
- Publisher: Magic Bytes
- Platforms: Amiga, Atari ST, Commodore 64, MS-DOS
- Release: 1989
- Genre: Business simulation

Wall$treet (Börsenfieber in German) is a business simulation video game published in 1989 by Magic Bytes for Amiga, Atari ST, Commodore 64, and MS-DOS.

== Gameplay ==
Wall$treet is a game in which a series of reports and telexes prompt players to make stock purchases and sales.

== Reception ==
Reception

Review score
Publication	Score
Aktueller Software Markt	10/12

Brian Walker reviewed Wall Street for Games International magazine, and gave it a rating of 1 out of 10 (a turkey), and stated that "It might be better as a multi player game but it's doubtful. As it stands, Wall Street is merely an unusual way of finding out if you have a future as a speed typist."

Brian Carroll for Game Player's PC Strategy Guide reviewed the game and said that "Wall$treet is fairly complex, presenting a market that reacts to events, dividend expenditures, borrowing, and the fluttering fortunes of the game's players."
