= List of Alarm für Cobra 11 – Die Autobahnpolizei episodes =

Alarm für Cobra 11 – Die Autobahnpolizei (German pronunciation: [aˈlaʁm fyːɐ̯ ˈkoːbʁaː ˌʔɛlf diː ˈaʊ̯tobaːnpoliˌtsaɪ̯]; Alarm for Cobra 11 – The Highway Police) is a long-running, popular German television series about a two-man team of highway police (Autobahnpolizei), originally set in Berlin and later in North Rhine-Westphalia. The series has been broadcast in countries worldwide.

As of November 3, 2022, 381 episodes of Alarm für Cobra 11 – Die Autobahnpolizei have aired. So far, the twenty-seventh season of the series has been concluded, and the three newest episodes have started the twenty-eighth season. These episodes are no longer the usual 45 minute duration, they are now all 90 minutes.

== Series overview ==
Season	Episodes	Originally released	
Season	Episodes	First released	Last released
1	9	March 12, 1996	May 7, 1996
2	6	March 11, 1997	April 15, 1997
3	16	October 14, 1997	June 18, 1998
4	16	October 1, 1998	May 6, 1999
5	11	December 16, 1999	March 24, 2000
6	11	November 9, 2000	May 31, 2001
7	14	November 8, 2001	May 2, 2002
8	14	September 5, 2002	April 10, 2003
9	18	September 11, 2003	May 13, 2004
10	18	September 9, 2004	March 31, 2005
11	12	September 15, 2005	May 28, 2006
12	20	September 7, 2006	May 10, 2007
13	14	September 20, 2007	April 24, 2008
14	15	September 4, 2008	April 9, 2009
15	15	September 3, 2009	April 22, 2010
16	13	September 2, 2010	April 14, 2011
17	16	September 15, 2011	April 19, 2012
18	15	September 6, 2012	April 18, 2013
19	14	October 17, 2013	May 15, 2014
20	15	October 9, 2014	April 30, 2015
21	16	September 10, 2015	May 26, 2016
22	20	September 1, 2016	May 18, 2017
23	19	September 14, 2017	May 3, 2018
24	18	September 13, 2018	June 6, 2019
25	9	September 12, 2019	November 14, 2019
26	6	August 20, 2020	September 24, 2020
27	8	July 29, 2021	August 12, 2021
28	3	October 20, 2022	November 3, 2022

== Episodes ==
=== Season 1 (1996) ===
No. overall	No. in season	Title	Directed by	Written by	Original release date
1	1	"Bombs on Km. 92"	Leo Zahn	Claude Clueni	March 12, 1996
2	2	"Red Rose, Black Death"	Tomy Wigand	Clementine Hegewisch	March 19, 1996
3	3	"The New Partner"	Peter Vogel	Fritz-Müller Scherz	March 26, 1996
4	4	"Blood & Thunder"	Peter Vogel	Fritz-Müller Scherz	April 2, 1996
5	5	"Death at 100 km/h"	Peter Vogel	Dirk Külov	April 9, 1996
6	6	"The Old & The Young"	Peter Vogel	Hubert Skloud	April 16, 1996
7	7	"Report This Blue Light"	Peter Vogel	Clemens Berger	April 23, 1996
8	8	"The Samurai"	Peter Vogel	Clemens Berger	April 30, 1996
9	9	"Terminus for All"	Peter Vogel	Clemens Berger	May 7, 1996

=== Season 2 (1997) ===
No. overall	No. in season	Title	Directed by	Written by	Original release date
10	1	"Exposed"	Peter Vogel	Mathias Herbert	March 11, 1997
11	2	"In Cold Blood"	Peter Vogel	K.M. Majewski	March 18, 1997
12	3	"Shotgun"	Peter Vogel	Mathias Herbert	March 25, 1997
13	4	"Emergency Landing"	Pete Ariel	Clementina Hegewisch & Fritz Müller-Scherz	April 1, 1997
14	5	"The Assassination"	Gabriele Heberling	Dieter Tarnowsky	April 8, 1997
15	6	"The Lost Daughter"	Robert Sigl	Renate Kampmann	April 15, 1997

=== Season 3 (1997–98) ===
No. overall	No. in season	Title	Directed by	Written by	Original release date
16	1	"Crash"	Gabriele Heberling	Norbert Eberlein	October 14, 1997
17	2	"Rehearsal"	Cornelia Dorn von Rossum	David Simmons	October 21, 1997
18	3	"Childcare"	Gabriele Heberling	Matthias Herbert	October 28, 1997
19	4	"Brake Failure"	Pete Ariel	Matthias Herbert	November 11, 1997
20	5	"Revenge is sweet"	Pete Ariel	Matthias Herrmann	November 18, 1997
21	6	"Crusader"	Cornelia Dorhn	Matthias Herbert	December 2, 1997
22	7	"Children of the Sun"	Dror Zahavi	Matthias Herbert	March 31, 1998
23	8	"Deadly Fame"	Hans Schönherr	Kai Hensel	April 7, 1998
24	9	"Volley Stop"	Pete Ariel	Matthias Herbert	April 16, 1998
25	10	"Short Rest"	Arend Aghte	Matthias Herbert	April 23, 1998
26	11	"Carcass"	Helmut Metzger	Mike Scheffner	April 30, 1998
27	12	"Poison"	Hans Schönherr	David Simmons	May 7, 1998
28	13	"Between the Lines"	Pete Ariel	Jochen Wermann	May 14, 1998
29	14	"Bargain Hunters"	Helmut Metzger	Hans Gerd Müller	May 28, 1998
30	15	"Rotten Apples"	Arend Aghte	Mike Scheffner	June 4, 1998
31	16	"Beat It!"	Pete Ariel	Matthias Herbert	June 18, 1998

=== Season 4 (1998–99) ===
No. overall	No. in season	Title	Directed by	Written by	Original release date
32	1	"A Leopard Runs Amok"	Helmut Metzger	Andreas Föhr & Thomas Letocha	October 1, 1998
33	2	"The Last Chance"	Helmut Metzger	David Simmons & Matthias Herbert	October 8, 1998
34	3	"Deadly Sand"	Christoph Eichhorn	Birgit Grosz	October 15, 1998
35	4	"In The Crosshairs"	Diethard Küster	Raphael Sola-Ferrer	October 22, 1998
36	5	"Disappeared in the Fog"	Diethard Küster	Iris Anna Otto & Susanne Mischke	October 29, 1998
37	6	"The Hitchhiker"	Oren Schmuckler	Matthias Herbert & David Simmons	November 5, 1998
38	7	"The Dead Witness"	Oren Schmuckler	Benedikt Gollhardt	November 12, 1998
39	8	"The Joker"	Diethard Küster	Matthias Herbert	November 19, 1998
40	9	"Fuel"	Helmut Metzger	Gerhard Rekel & Alexander Hahn	March 18, 1999
41	10	"Deadly Landing"	Marc Herte	TOPAS Autorenpartnerschaft	March 25, 1999
42	11	"Burning Ambition"	Helmut Metzger	Enrico Jakob & Matthias Herbert	April 1, 1999
43	12	"Shadow Warrior"	Raoul W. Heimrich	Lorenz Stassen	April 8, 1999
44	13	"Taxi 541"	Christoph Eichhorn	Matthias Herbert	April 15, 1999
45	14	"The Judge"	Raoul W. Heimrich	Matthias Herbert	April 22, 1999
46	15	"The Death of a Boy (Part 1)"	Helmut Metzger	Uli Tobinsky	April 29, 1999
47	16	"A Lone Victory (Part 2)"	Helmut Metzger	Uli Tobinsky	May 6, 1999

=== Season 5 (1999–00) ===
No. overall	No. in season	Title	Directed by	Written by	Original release date
48	1	"Hell of a Trip on the A4"	Raoul W. Heimrich	Dieter Tarnowski	December 16, 1999
49	2	"Blind Love"	Michael Karen	Ralf Ruland	January 6, 2000
50	3	"Tulips from Amsterdam"	Matthias Tiefenbacher	Iris Anna Otto & Susanne Mischke	January 13, 2000
51	4	"A Nasty Surprise"	Raoul W. Heimrich	David Simmons	January 19, 2000
52	5	"Hare & Hedgedog"	Diethard Küster	Andreas Heckmann & Andreas Schmitz	February 10, 2000
53	6	"Highway Maniac"	Matthias Tiefenbacher	Uli Tobinsky	February 17, 2000
54	7	"On the Run"	Diethard Küster	Andreas Föhr & Thomas Letocha	February 24, 2000
55	8	"Dangerous Toys"	Stephen Manuel	Stefan Dauck & Christian Heider	March 2, 2000
56	9	"Mysterious Power"	Axel Barth	Uli Tobinsky	March 9, 2000
57	10	"The Cabin on the Lake"	Stephen Manuel	Lorenz Stassen	March 16, 2000
58	11	"The Black Rose"	Raoul W. Heimrich	Ralf Ruland	March 24, 2000

=== Season 6 (2000–01) ===
No. overall	No. in season	Title	Directed by	Written by	Original release date
59	1	"Forgotten Memories"	Raoul W. Heimrich	Rob Hüttinger & David Simmons	November 9, 2000
60	2	"Janina"	Michael Schneider	David Simmons	November 16, 2000
61	3	"The Mole"	Axel Barth	Andreas Föhr, Thomas Letocha & David Simmons	November 23, 2000
62	4	"Checkmate"	Axel Barth	Erdoğan Atalay & Torsten Buchsteiner	December 7, 2000
63	5	"Schumann's Big Chance"	Axel Barth	Andreas Heckmann & Andreas Schmitz	December 14, 2000
64	6	"Death Ride on Line 834"	Raoul W. Heimrich	Dieter Tarnowski	April 5, 2001
65	7	"Fever Dreams"	Carmen Kurz	Ralf Ruland	April 12, 2001
66	8	"Death by Engine"	Axel Barth	Uli Tobinsky	April 19, 2001
67	9	"Between Two Stools"	Raoul W. Heimrich	Hans G. Müller-Welters	May 3, 2001
68	10	"Crash Course"	Carmen Kurz	Ekki Voigt & David Simmons	May 10, 2001
69	11	"Loved to Death"	Axel Barth	Ralf Ruland	May 31, 2001

=== Season 7 (2001–02) ===
No. overall	No. in season	Title	Directed by	Written by	Original release date
70	1	"Schmolder's Dream"	Ralf Ruland	Axel Barth	November 8, 2001
71	2	"Double Nightmare"	Carmen Kurz	Anni Grossmann	November 15, 2001
72	3	"Tina and Aysim"	Axel Barth	David Simmons	November 22, 2001
73	4	"High Speed"	Raoul W. Heimrich	Stefan Dauck & Christian Heider	December 6, 2001
74	5	"Hostile Brothers"	Axel Barth	Arne Nolting & Martin Scharf	December 13, 2001
75	6	"Black Widow"	Raoul W. Heimrich	Rafael Sola-Ferrer	December 20, 2001
76	7	"Truckstop"	Raoul W. Heimrich	Stefan Dauck & Christian Heider	March 14, 2002
77	8	"Foul Play"	Carmen Kurz	Ralf Ruland	March 21, 2002
78	9	"Short Luck"	Raoul W. Heimrich	David Simmons	March 28, 2002
79	10	"Matter of Horror"	Axel Barth	Andreas Heckmann & Andreas Schmitz	April 4, 2002
80	11	"The Racing Team"	Raoul W. Heimrich	Manfred Berger & David Simmons	April 11, 2002
81	12	"The Little One"	Carmen Kurz	Andreas Schmitz & Andreas Heckmann	April 18, 2002
82	13	"Black Sheep"	Axel Barth	Elke Schilling & Thomas Schwank	April 25, 2002
83	14	"Blackout"	Raoul W. Heimrich	Markus Hoffmann	May 2, 2002

=== Season 8 (2002–03) ===
No. overall	No. in season	Title	Directed by	Written by	Original release date
84	1	"Manhunt"	Raoul W. Heimrich	Ralf Ruland	September 5, 2002
85	2	"Deadly Arts"	Sebastian Vigg	Jeanet Pfitzer & Frank Koopmann	September 12, 2002
86	3	"In the Crossfire"	Unknown	Markus Müller	September 19, 2002
87	4	"Helpless"	Carmen Kurz	Nick Ickx & Stefan Sasse	September 26, 2002
88	5	"To the Bitter End"	Carmen Kurz	Lorenz Stassen	October 10, 2002
89	6	"The Perfect Murder"	Sebastian Vigg	Elke Schilling	October 17, 2002
90	7	"Father and Son"	Holger Gimpel	Andreas Schmitz & Andreas Heckmann	October 24, 2002
91	8	"The Group"	Holger Gimpel	Stefan Dauck & Christian Heider	October 31, 2002
92	9	"Late Revenge"	Raoul W. Heimrich	Andreas Schmitz & Andreas Heckmann	November 7, 2002
93	10	"Death of a Reporter"	Carmen Kurz	Stefan Dauck & Christian Heider	March 13, 2003
94	11	"A Tough Case"	Holger Gimpel	Andreas Schmitz & Andreas Heckmann	March 20, 2003
95	12	"Betrayed and Sold"	Sebastian Vigg	Stefan Dauck & Christian Heider	March 27, 2003
96	13	"Shadows of the Past"	Carmen Kurz	Uli Tobinsky	April 3, 2003
97	14	"Resignation"	Carmen Kurz	Andreas Schmitz & Andreas Heckmann	April 10, 2003

=== Season 9 (2003–04) ===
No. overall	No. in season	Title	Directed by	Written by	Original release date
98	1	"Baptism of Fire"	Raoul W. Heimrich	Roland Heep & Frank Koopmann	September 11, 2003
99	2	"Wrong Traffic Lights"	Raoul W. Heimrich	David Simmons	September 18, 2003
100	3	"Against the Time"	Sebastian Vigg	Frank Koopmann & Jeanet Pfitzer	September 18, 2003
101	4	"Family Ties"	Carmen Kurz	Ralf Ruland	September 25, 2003
102	5	"Deadly Cargo"	Axel Barth	Markus Hoffmann	October 2, 2003
103	6	"The Impact"	Axel Barth	Lorenz Stassen	October 9, 2003
104	7	"Rock 'n' Roll"	Holger Gimpel	Andreas Heckmann & Andreas Schmitz	October 16, 2003
105	8	"Countdown"	Raoul W. Heimrich	Ingo Regenbogen & Horst Wieschen	October 23, 2003
106	9	"The Detective"	Sebastian Vigg	Axel Bär	October 30, 2003
107	10	"Sitting Ducks"	Carmen Kurz	Elke Schilling	March 18, 2004
108	11	"No Way Out"	Axel Barth	Lorenz Stassen	March 25, 2004
109	12	"Heinrich and Paul"	Holger Gimpel	Andreas Heckmann & Andreas Schmitz	April 1, 2004
110	13	"In the Sight of Death"	Hermann Joha & Carmen Kurz	Markus Hoffmann	April 8, 2004
111	14	"Sabotage"	Holger Gimpel	Ingo Regenbogen & Horst Wieschen	April 8, 2004
112	15	"The Deathlist"	Holger Gimpel	Ralf Ruland	April 22, 2004
113	16	"Undercover"	Holger Gimpel	Frank Koopmann & Jeanet Pfitzer	April 29, 2004
114	17	"Confident Enemy"	Carmen Kurz	Elke Schilling	May 6, 2004
115	18	"The Witness"	Holger Gimpel	Jörg Schnitger & Sven Ulrich	May 13, 2004

=== Season 10 (2004–05) ===
No. overall	No. in season	Title	Original release date
116	1	"Forever and Ever"	September 9, 2004
117	2	"At Any Price"	September 16, 2004
118	3	"Friends in Need"	September 23, 2004
119	4	"Showdown"	September 30, 2004
120	5	"Who Sows The Wind..."	October 7, 2004
121	6	"Fire and Flames"	October 14, 2004
122	7	"Mother's Day"	October 28, 2004
123	8	"Merciless"	November 4, 2004
124	9	"False Friendship"	November 11, 2004
125	10	"Extreme"	November 18, 2004
126	11	"Comeback"	February 10, 2005
127	12	"The Commissioner"	February 17, 2005
128	13	"Heroes Day"	February 24, 2005
129	14	"High Tension"	March 3, 2005
130	15	"The Hunter and The Hunted"	March 10, 2005
131	16	"Hostile Takeover"	March 17, 2005
132	17	"Explosive"	March 24, 2005
133	18	"Fire Alarm"	March 31, 2005

=== Season 11 (2005–06) ===
No. overall	No. in season	Title	Original release date
134	1	"Target: Highway"	September 15, 2005
135	2	"Self-Defence"	September 22, 2005
136	3	"Courage"	September 22, 2005
137	4	"On The Hunt"	October 6, 2005
138	5	"Younger Sister"	October 13, 2005
139	6	"Suspected"	March 30, 2006
140	7	"On the Edge"	April 6, 2006
141	8	"Fever"	April 13, 2006
142	9	"Out Of Control"	April 20, 2006
143	10	"No Way Back"	April 27, 2006
144	11	"Flashback"	May 11, 2006
145	12	"Under Fire"	May 28, 2006

=== Season 12 (2006–07) ===
No. overall	No. in season	Title	Original release date
146	1	"Matter of Trust"	September 7, 2006
147	2	"Full Risk"	September 7, 2006
148	3	"In the Face of Death"	September 14, 2006
149	4	"Laura's Decision"	September 21, 2006
150	5	"Deadly Probation"	September 28, 2006
151	6	"Friendship"	October 5, 2006
152	7	"The Second Chance"	October 12, 2006
153	8	"Frankie"	October 19, 2006
154	9	"The Promise"	October 26, 2006
155	10	"The Last Coup"	November 2, 2006
156	11	"The Driver"	November 9, 2006
157	12	"Break a Leg"	November 16, 2006
158	13	"Life and Death"	March 22, 2007
159	14	"For the Best of Intentions"	March 29, 2007
160	15	"Nemesis"	April 5, 2007
161	16	"The Partner"	April 12, 2007
162	17	"Against Every Rule"	April 19, 2007
163	18	"The Prosecutor"	April 26, 2007
164	19	"Mortal Enemies"	May 3, 2007
165	20	"Crime and Punishment"	May 10, 2007

=== Season 13 (2007–08) ===
No. overall	No. in season	Title	Original release date
166	1	"Kidnapped"	September 20, 2007
167	2	"Infarction"	September 27, 2007
168	3	"Rat's Nest"	October 4, 2007
169	4	"Surrender"	October 11, 2007
170	5	"Old School"	October 18, 2007
171	6	"Moment of Truth"	October 25, 2007
172	7	"Family Matters"	November 1, 2007
173	8	"City in Danger"	March 13, 2008
174	9	"Collection"	March 20, 2008
175	10	"Eye for an Eye"	March 27, 2008
176	11	"Live and Let Live"	April 3, 2008
177	12	"Total Loss"	April 10, 2008
178	13	"Exodus"	April 17, 2008
179	14	"Among Enemies"	April 24, 2008

=== Season 14 (2008–09) ===
No. overall	No. in season	Title	Original release date
180	1	"On Your Own"	September 4, 2008
181	2	"At the End of Youth"	September 11, 2008
182	3	"Raven Mother"	September 18, 2008
183	4	"Shadow Man"	September 25, 2008
184	5	"Under Pressure"	October 2, 2008
185	6	"Whoever Lies Once"	October 9, 2008
186	7	"The Betrayal"	October 16, 2008
187	8	"Bodyguard"	October 23, 2008
188	9	"Buried"	October 30, 2008
189	10	"Out"	March 5, 2009
190	11	"The Bride"	March 12, 2009
191	12	"Geniuses Among Themselves"	March 19, 2009
192	13	"The Plot"	March 26, 2009
193	14	"The Black Madonna"	April 2, 2009
194	15	"Suicide Mission"	April 9, 2009

=== Season 15 (2009–10) ===
No. overall	No. in season	Title	Original release date
195	1	"The End of the World"	September 3, 2009
196	2	"The Cartel"	September 10, 2009
197	3	"Brotherly Love"	September 17, 2009
198	4	"Operation: Gemini"	September 24, 2009
199	5	"The Panther"	October 1, 2009
200	6	"The Lost Son"	October 8, 2009
201	7	"Old Friends"	October 15, 2009
202	8	"Rhine in Flames"	October 22, 2009
203	9	"Beloved Enemy"	October 29, 2009
204	10	"Coma"	March 11, 2010
205	11	"Cyberstorm"	March 18, 2010
206	12	"Bounty on Kim Krüger"	March 25, 2010
207	13	"Day of Darkness"	April 8, 2010
208	14	"Without a Trace"	April 15, 2010
209	15	"Codename: Tiger"	April 22, 2010

=== Season 16 (2010–11) ===
No. overall	No. in season	Title	Original release date
210	1	"The Assault"	September 2, 2010
211	2	"For The Life of a Friend"	September 9, 2010
212	3	"The Examiner"	September 16, 2010
213	4	"The Last Day"	September 23, 2010
214	5	"Turbo & Tacho"	September 30, 2010
215	6	"Formula Future"	October 7, 2010
216	7	"The Attack"	October 14, 2010
217	8	"Bad Bank"	March 10, 2011
218	9	"The Second Life"	March 17, 2011
219	10	"Higher, Faster, Further"	March 24, 2011
220	11	"And Action!"	March 31, 2011
221	12	"In The Line of Fire"	April 7, 2011
222	13	"Dead Brother"	April 14, 2011

=== Season 17 (2011–12) ===
No. overall	No. in season	Title	Original release date
223	1	"72 Hours of Anxiety"	September 15, 2011
224	2	"Race Against Time"	September 22, 2011
225	3	"Stabbed in the Heart"	September 29, 2011
226	4	"Turbo & Tacho: Reloaded"	October 6, 2011
227	5	"En Vogue"	October 13, 2011
228	6	"Family Matters"	October 20, 2011
229	7	"Baby Alarm"	October 27, 2011
230	8	"The Conspiracy"	November 3, 2011
231	9	"Viva Colonia"	November 10, 2011
232	10	"Supersonic"	March 8, 2012
233	11	"The Ex"	March 15, 2012
234	12	"Dog Days"	March 22, 2012
235	13	"The Pain in The Ass"	March 29, 2012
236	14	"The Hunted"	April 5, 2012
237	15	"Broken"	April 12, 2012
238	16	"Snake Pit"	April 19, 2012

=== Season 18 (2012–13) ===
No. overall	No. in season	Title	Original release date
239	1	"Angel of Death"	September 6, 2012
240	2	"Without Conscience"	September 13, 2012
241	3	"Operation: Job"	September 20, 2012
242	4	"Ordered, Abducted, Delivered"	September 27, 2012
243	5	"Greed"	October 4, 2012
244	6	"Alone"	February 14, 2013
245	7	"The Mentalist"	February 21, 2013
246	8	"Stolen Love"	February 28, 2013
247	9	"The Bumpkin"	March 7, 2013
248	10	"Hangover"	March 14, 2013
249	11	"The Au Pair Girl"	March 21, 2013
250	12	"Friends for Life"	March 28, 2013
251	13	"Shutdown"	April 4, 2013
252	14	"Money Rules the World"	April 11, 2013
253	15	"Deadly Decision"	April 18, 2013

=== Season 19 (2013–14) ===
No. overall	No. in season	Title	Original release date
254	1	"Resurrection"	October 17, 2013
255	2	"The Night Reporter"	October 24, 2013
256	3	"Retaliation"	October 31, 2013
257	4	"The Huge Comeback"	November 6, 2013
258	5	"The Young Princess"	November 13, 2013
259	6	"Wild Animals"	November 20, 2013
260	7	"Executive Decision"	November 27, 2013
261	8	"Revolution"	March 27, 2014
262	9	"The Hostage"	April 3, 2014
263	10	"Family Feast"	April 10, 2014
264	11	"Paint Damage"	April 17, 2014
265	12	"1983"	April 24, 2014
266	13	"Competition"	May 8, 2014
267	14	"The Dead Don't Come Back"	May 15, 2014

=== Season 20 (2014–15) ===
No. overall	No. in season	Title	Original release date
268	1	"The Dark Side"	October 9, 2014
269	2	"Young, Female, Highly Explosive"	October 16, 2014
270	3	"Stiller's Files"	October 23, 2014
271	4	"The Last Night"	October 30, 2014
272	5	"Jump"	November 6, 2014
273	6	"The Bodyguard"	November 13, 2014
274	7	"At One's Own Risk"	November 20, 2014
275	8	"The Last Race"	March 12, 2015
276	9	"Erased (Part 1)"	March 19, 2015
277	10	"Erased (Part 2)"	March 26, 2015
278	11	"Playing With Fire"	April 2, 2015
279	12	"Fear"	April 9, 2015
280	13	"Goal"	April 16, 2015
281	14	"Where is Semir?"	April 23, 2015
282	15	"Judgement Day"	April 30, 2015

=== Season 21 (2015–16) ===
No. overall	No. in season	Title	Original release date
283	1	"Vendetta"	September 10, 2015
284	2	"Blood Money"	September 17, 2015
285	3	"Lockdown"	September 17, 2015
286	4	"Thousand Deaths"	September 24, 2015
287	5	"Duel in the Wild"	October 1, 2015
288	6	"Space"	October 15, 2015
289	7	"Stolen Life"	October 22, 2015
290	8	"The Boxer"	October 29, 2015
291	9	"Wind Chimes"	November 5, 2015
292	10	"Cobra 11, Responding"	April 7, 2016
293	11	"Battue"	April 14, 2016
294	12	"Deadly Profit"	April 21, 2016
295	13	"Payday"	April 28, 2016
296	14	"Tricks"	May 12, 2016
297	15	"Spoils of War"	May 19, 2016
298	16	"The Wrong Side"	May 26, 2016

=== Season 22 (2016–17) ===
No. overall	No. in season	Title	Original release date
299	1	"The Boss"	September 1, 2016
300	2	"In the Footsteps of My Father"	September 8, 2016
301	3	"Phantom Code"	September 15, 2016
302	4	"King of Thieves"	September 22, 2016
303	5	"From Moscow with Love"	September 29, 2016
304	6	"Drift"	October 6, 2016
305	7	"Burned Out"	October 13, 2016
306	8	"Death without Warning"	October 20, 2016
307	9	"The Serious Side of Life"	October 27, 2016
308	10	"Fatherly Joys"	November 3, 2016
309	11	"Operation: Midas"	November 10, 2016
310	12	"Risk"	November 17, 2016
311	13	"Nude Alert for Semir"	April 6, 2017
312	14	"Breathless Love"	April 13, 2017
313	15	"Summer & Sharky"	April 20, 2017
314	16	"Trapped"	April 27, 2017
315	17	"Death of a King"	May 4, 2017
316	18	"The B-Team"	May 11, 2017
317	19	"Ghosts of the Past"	May 18, 2017

=== Season 23 (2017–18) ===
No. overall	No. in season	Title	Original release date
318	1	"East of Eden"	September 14, 2017
319	2	"The Price of Friendship"	September 21, 2017
320	3	"Undercover Parents"	September 28, 2017
321	4	"Road Trip"	October 12, 2017
322	5	"The King of Ahijada"	October 19, 2017
323	6	"Halloween"	October 26, 2017
324	7	"The Lost Children"	November 2, 2017
325	8	"Everything out of Love"	November 9, 2017
326	9	"Among Brothers"	November 16, 2017
327	10	"A Shit Day"	November 30, 2017
328	11	"Freefall"	December 7, 2017
329	12	"Blood and Water"	December 14, 2017
330	13	"Survival"	December 21, 2017
331	14	"Hooray for Bollywood"	March 29, 2018
332	15	"Car Hacker"	April 5, 2018
333	16	"Blind Witness"	April 12, 2018
334	17	"Hero of the Street"	April 19, 2018
335	18	"No Escape"	April 26, 2018
336	19	"Field Trip"	May 3, 2018

=== Season 24 (2018–19) ===
No. overall	No. in season	Title	Original release date
337	1	"Most Wanted"	September 13, 2018
338	2	"Hard School"	September 20, 2018
339	3	"Showtime for Paul"	September 27, 2018
340	4	"11th Hour"	October 4, 2018
341	5	"Manhunt for Semir"	October 11, 2018
342	6	"Hostile Atmosphere"	October 18, 2018
343	7	"The Power Pair"	October 25, 2018
344	8	"Amnesia"	November 1, 2018
345	9	"Weiberfastnacht"	November 8, 2018
346	10	"Guardian Angel"	November 29, 2018
347	11	"Between Life and Death"	December 6, 2018
348	12	"Dead End"	March 21, 2019
349	13	"Spark"	March 28, 2019
350	14	"The List"	April 4, 2019
351	15	"The Guardians of Engonia"	April 25, 2019
352	16	"Guilt"	May 16, 2019
353	17	"The Client"	May 23, 2019
354	18	"The Best Last Days"	June 6, 2019

=== Season 25 (2019) ===
No. overall	No. in season	Title	Original release date
355	1	"Happy Birthday"	September 12, 2019
356	2	"Out of Breath"	September 19, 2019
357	3	"Zoé"	September 26, 2019
358	4	"Fateful Night"	October 3, 2019
359	5	"The Medic"	October 10, 2019
360	6	"On Probation"	October 17, 2019
361	7	"End of Watch"	October 31, 2019
362	8	"Bride Alarm"	October 31, 2019
363	9	"Legacy (Part 1)"	November 14, 2019
364	10	"Legacy (Part 2)"	November 14, 2019

=== Season 26 (2020) ===
No. overall	No. in season	Title	Original release date
365	1	"The New"	August 20, 2020
366	2	"The Whole Truth"	August 20, 2020
367	3	"Brave New World"	August 27, 2020
368	4	"Collision"	September 10, 2020
369	5	"Abyss"	September 17, 2020
370	6	"A Long Way"	September 24, 2020

=== Season 27 (2021) ===
No. overall	No. in season	Title	Original release date
371	1	"Silent Pain"	July 29, 2021
372	2	"Merciless"	July 29, 2021
373	3	"Liftoff"	July 29, 2021
374	4	"Identity"	August 5, 2021
375	5	"Completely Painless"	August 5, 2021
376	6	"The Enemy Within"	August 5, 2021
377	7	"The Team (Part 1)"	August 12, 2021
378	8	"The Team (Part 2)"	August 12, 2021

=== Season 28 (2022) ===
No. overall	No. in season	Title	Directed by	Written by	Original release date
379	1	"Unforgiving"	Franco Tozza	Etienne Heimann	October 20, 2022
380	2	"Powerless"	Franco Tozza	Etienne Heimann & Sabine Leipert	October 27, 2022
381	3	"Defenseless"	Franco Tozza & Darius Simaifar	Etienne Heimann & Marc Hillefeld & Sabine Leipert	November 3, 2022
