= Mercedes-Benz Truck Racing =

2000 video game

- Developer: Synetic
- Publisher: THQ
- Engine: 3D Landscape Engine
- Platform: Windows
- Release: 2000
- Genre: Racing
- Modes: Single-player, multiplayer

Mercedes-Benz Truck Racing (MBTR) is a simulation truck racing video game developed by the German company Synetic GmbH and published by THQ. The game was released for Microsoft Windows in 2000. The development was carried out in cooperation with Daimler AG, owner of Mercedes-Benz.

In 2003, Synetic developed another game focused on Mercedes-Benz cars - Mercedes-Benz World Racing. That game uses a significantly improved version of the game engine on which Mercedes-Benz Truck Racing is based.

== Gameplay ==
Mercedes-Benz Truck Racing is a racing simulator that revolved around licensed racing trucks of the Mercedes-Benz brand. When developing the game, special attention was paid to the correct physical model of cars and the damage system; vehicles are modeled from real prototypes.

Passing various racing stages in the championship unlocks previously inaccessible trucks. The tracks are based on real racetracks.

The player vehicle is controlled using the keyboard and a racing wheel is supported.

== Reception ==
Professional ratings
Review scores
Source	Rating
Gamekult	6/10
JeuxVideoPC.com	75%
Jeuxvideo.com	75%
PC Games (Germany)	80%
PC Player (Germany)	80%
GameStar (Germany)	86%
Gamesmania	88%

The game was highly praised by the specialized press. French publications JeuxVideoPC.com and Jeuxvideo.com have rated the game 75% out of 100%, respectively; a lower score for the game (6/10) was rated by the website Gamekult.

Mercedes-Benz Truck Racing received an 80% rating from German magazines PC Games Germany and PC Player Germany. According to MobyRank's ratings, the highest scores - 86% and 88% - were given to the game by GameStar and Gamesmania.

The average score according to the MobyRank rating is 79% out of 100%.
