= Katrin Heß =

German actress (born 1985)

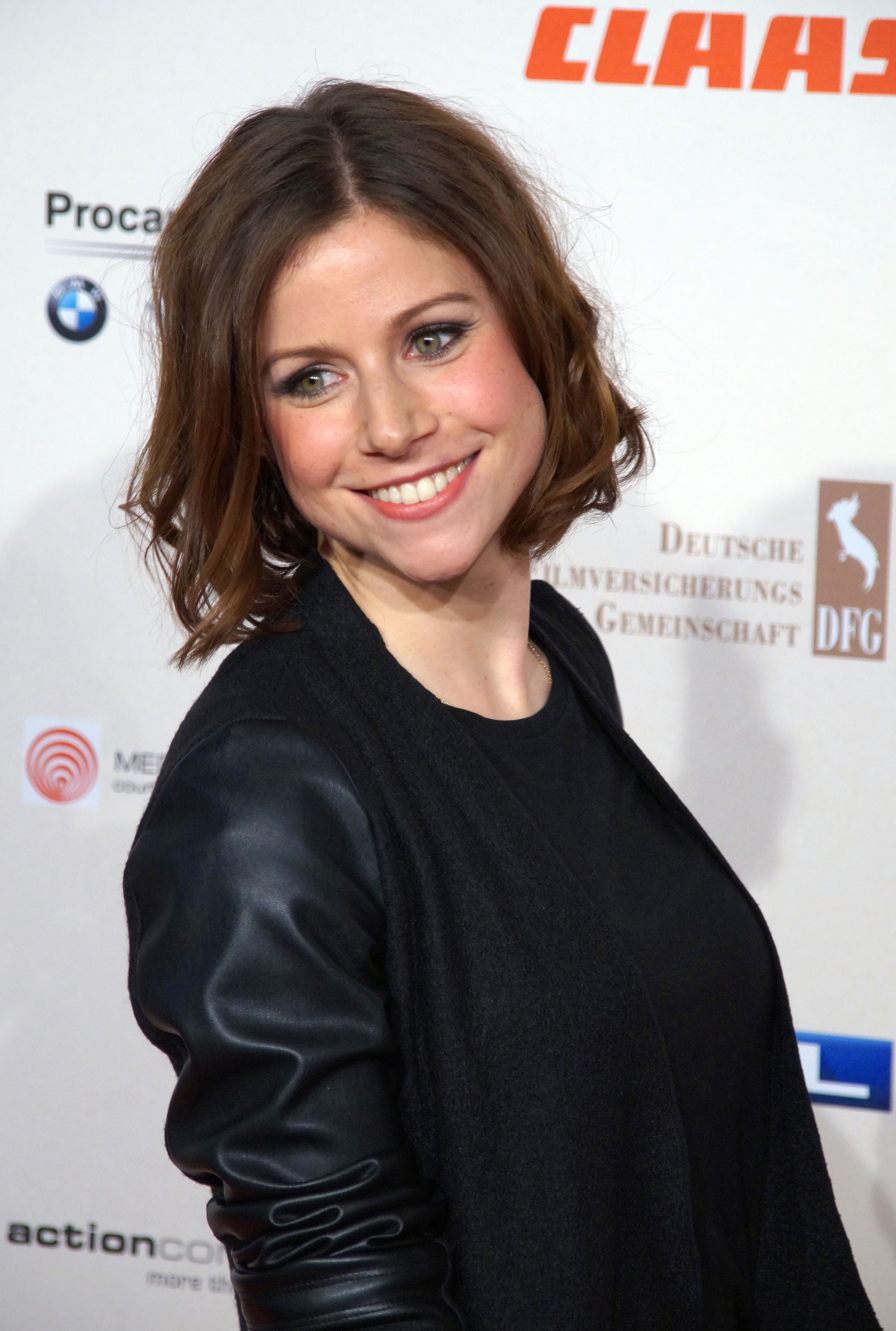
- Heß in 2016
- Born: 26 June 1985 (age 41); Aachen, North Rhine-Westphalia, West Germany
- Occupations: Actress, voice actress
- Years active: 2003–present

Katrin Heß (pronounced "Hess"; born 26 June 1985) is a German actress.

== Career ==
Heß took a two-year training in acting at the Arturo Schauspielschule, Cologne. Following that, she made her first experiences with the theater in Cologne.

Heß rose to prominence with the television soap opera Verbotene Liebe (Forbidden Love) on Das Erste as Judith Hajedörp. In 2008, Heß played Pia Benning in episode 74 of the RTL action series 112 – Sie retten dein Leben.

In 2011, Heß began playing the role of Detective Jenny Dorn in the RTL series Alarm für Cobra 11 – Die Autobahnpolizei, which she continued until 2019. In the same year, she also appeared in Cologne P.D. and Countdown – Die Jagd beginnt.

Heß appeared alongside Ann-Kathrin Kramer and Stephan Kampwirth in the 2012 TV movie Alles Bestens.

Heß became a vegetarian in 2015.

The October 2017 issue of the German edition of Playboy magazine published a photo series with Heß as the cover model.

Heß is currently playing the role of Cindy Geldermacher in WDR's series Meuchelbeck.

== Filmography ==
- 2008: 112 – Sie retten dein Leben
- 2008–2009: Verbotene Liebe (episodes 3106–3464)
- 2011–2019: Alarm für Cobra 11 – Die Autobahnpolizei
- 2011: Alles Bestens
- 2011: Cologne P.D.
- 2011: Countdown – Die Jagd beginnt
- 2012: Danni Lowinski
- 2012: Die Garmisch-Cops
- 2014–2016: Herzensbrecher – Vater von vier Söhnen
- 2014: Das Traumschiff
- 2014: Death in Brittany
- 2015: Einstein
- 2015: Meuchelbeck
- 2016: Cologne P.D.
- 2016: Heldt
- 2017: Hubert und Staller

== Voice-over work ==
- 2009: Summer Wars
- 2009–2010: Fullmetal Alchemist: Brotherhood
- 2011: Schwerter des Königs – Zwei Welten
- 2011: Blue Exorcist
- 2011–2014: Silk
- 2012: Call the Midwife
- 2012: Sorority Party Massacre
- 2012–2014: Magi: The Labyrinth of Magic
- 2014: Nisekoi
- 2015: The Witcher 3: Wild Hunt
- 2015: Is It Wrong to Try to Pick Up Girls in a Dungeon?
- 2016: Class
