= Pink Panther (video game) =

1988 video game

- Developer: Magic Bytes
- Publisher: Gremlin Graphics
- Platforms: Amiga; Amstrad CPC; Atari ST; Commodore 64; ZX Spectrum
- Release: EU: 1988
- Mode: Single-player

Pink Panther is a 1988 video game based on the character of the same name. It was developed by German company Magic Bytes and published by Gremlin Graphics. It was released in Europe for Amiga, Amstrad CPC, Atari ST, Commodore 64, and ZX Spectrum. Pink Panther was criticized for its control and difficulty, although the Amiga and Atari ST versions received praise for their graphics.

== Gameplay ==
The Pink Panther wants to take a vacation on an island, but he lacks the funds to do so. To raise the necessary money he takes a job as a butler so he can rob the wealthy homeowners of their belongings while they sleep. The game takes place across several mansions, played one at a time. Playing as the Pink Panther, the player must purchase the items necessary to qualify for each butler job. Such requirements include a top hat for the first mansion, and a car for one of the later mansions. In each mansion, the homeowner turns out to be a sleepwalker. The player must steal belongings around the house while simultaneously preventing the homeowner from bumping into obstacles, which will wake up the owner and foil the Pink Panther's theft. In each mansion, the player has a side view of the home with several floors visible on the screen.

The player must also avoid Inspector Clouseau, who looks for the Pink Panther in each mansion. The player has various items that can be used to avoid Clouseau and also prevent the sleepwalking homeowner from waking up. Items such as catapults and springboards can be used to help the homeowner get across obstacles, and a bell can also be used to redirect the owner in different directions. Another item is an inflatable Pink Panther, which can be used to distract Clouseau.

== Reception ==
Reception

Review scores
Publication	Score
ACE	499/1000 (Amiga)
Crash	34% (ZX Spectrum)
Sinclair User	51% (ZX Spectrum)
Your Sinclair	5/10 (ZX Spectrum)
Zzap!64	14% (C64)
Commodore Computing International	26% (C64)
Commodore User	6/10 (Amiga)
Datormagazin	3.5/5 (Amiga)
The Games Machine	39% (Amiga); 30% (Amstrad CPC); 34% (Atari ST); 32% (C64); 36% (ZX Spectrum)
ST Action	32% (Atari ST)
Your Amiga	56/100 (Amiga)

Some critics considered the game to be a disappointment, and others believed that only Pink Panther fans would enjoy it. Reviewers were critical of the game's control and difficulty. Mark Patterson of Commodore User stated that Pink Panther "was a potentially good idea but it's over-shadowed by its extreme and sometimes tedious level of difficulty." Gordon Hamlett of Your Amiga called the gameplay "disastrous," stating that it was too complicated to use items in the game. Hamlett wrote, "The objects are frequently unidentifiable and by the time you have worked out what you think you might like to try, your master has hit a wall and you have to start all over again."

The Games Machine also criticized the "awkward" system used to manipulate the homeowner's movements, stating that it "requires rapid and accurate reactions, and if a single mistake is made, you have to go right back to the beginning." Tony Horgan of Commodore Computing International considered the "extremely awkward controls" to be one of the worst aspects of the game, writing that "the combinations of joystick position and fire button needed to select and place the right object can be infuriatingly difficult to carry out." Eugene Lacey of Computer and Video Games was also critical of the number of joystick and key-pressing maneuvers required to select and activate items, and stated that the game would have benefited from a higher degree of playability. Steve Merrett of ST Action wrote, "Having to redirect the sleepwalker is tedious and having finally managed it on one occasion, the wretched Inspector caught me straight away."

The graphics were generally praised on the Amiga and Atari ST. However, Rod Lawton of ACE wrote, "It's all pretty enough, but the graphics are nothing special by 16-bit standards". The graphics of the other versions received some criticism. The Games Machine wrote that the graphics "predictably fall short of the 16 bit versions." The magazine considered the Commodore 64 (C64) version the best-looking of the 8-bit versions, while stating that the Amstrad CPC version had "cramped sprites". Critics stated that the ZX Spectrum version suffered from attribute clash. Horgan, reviewing the C64 version, stated that the Pink Panther's limited frames of animation "are not enough to give fluid movement."

Thomas Brandt of Aktueller Software Markt praised all aspects of the Amiga version, including the graphics and sound. Hamlett praised the sound as well, and The Games Machine praised the music. Reviewers for Zzap!64 criticized the music, which was described by Horgan as depressing. Reviewers for ST Action criticized the lack of the Pink Panther theme music, and Lawton considered the music to be a poor imitation of the theme. Reviewers for Crash criticized the lack of music in the 48k and 128k versions of the ZX Spectrum game.

Amiga Review criticized the instruction manual for being vague, and other critics stated that the manual was poorly translated from German. The Atari ST version received some criticism for its slow loading.
