= Ferrari Virtual Race =

2009 racing simulator video game

- Developer: Synetic
- Publisher: Ferrari
- Series: Ferrari
- Engine: 3D Landscape Engine
- Platform: Windows
- Release: March 30, 2009
- Genre: Racing simulator
- Mode: Single-player

Ferrari Virtual Race (FVR) is a racing simulator developed by Synetic and published by Ferrari for Windows. It was released on March 30, 2009, and could be downloadable from the Ferrari website.

== Gameplay ==
Ferrari Virtual Race is a racing simulator in which player can drive three different Ferrari vehicles on the Mugello Circuit. The three cars player can drive are the Ferrari 599 GTB Fiorano, the Ferrari 612 Scaglietti, and the Ferrari 430 Scuderia, and you can apply different paint schemes to them. In the race settings, player can choose the number of laps or the number of opponents. Furthermore, the AI of the opponents can be configured to make them more or less skilled. One of the most noteworthy aspects is its graphics; even the car bodywork is damaged upon impact. There are also many configuration options. Ferrari Virtual Race is a racing game that is somewhat limited, offering only one track and three cars.

== Reception ==
Pelit gave a score of 60 out of 100 and liked the graphics but said there is a lack of content and the AI could be better. PC Jeux said the game has well-modeled cars and highly detailed environments but the car interiors look poor. Overall, they gave a positive review and recommended the game to fans of racing games that are easy to learn. Softpedia called the game "an above decent racing simulator". Drive.com.au wrote: "Graphics are top-notch for those of you with highly-specced computers, and while the gameplay isn't entirely realistic (drifting seems a little too easy), it's pretty accessible for novices."
