= World Racing 2 =

2005 video game

- European cover art for PC, featuring the Volkswagen W12
- Developer: Synetic
- Publishers: Playlogic Entertainment (Europe); Evolved Games (North America), TDK (Europe)
- Designer: Synetic
- Platforms: PlayStation 2; Windows; Xbox
- Release: September 29, 2005
- Genre: Racing

World Racing 2 is a racing video game. It was developed by Synetic. It was released for Windows, PlayStation 2 and Xbox. It was released in North America in 2006. It is the sequel to World Racing from 2003. Unlike World Racing, the game was not released for Nintendo GameCube.

The game was re-released on Steam on 8 December 2022 under the subtitle "Champion Edition". The Champion Edition employs quality of life fixes and the removal of licensed cars, vinyls and rims.

== Gameplay ==
World Racing 2's gameplay is fairly typical of arcade driving sims and is in many ways similar to the first game, Mercedes-Benz World Racing, as well as games such as Need for Speed: Porsche Unleashed.

The player has to complete 'championships' - stages with a certain number of tracks, which the game is divided into, and unlock previously inaccessible tracks and cars. There are more than a hundred racing tracks in the game. Countries of interest include Italy, Egypt and the USA (Miami and Hawaii).

The game features over forty car models, including Alfa Romeo, Volkswagen, Skoda, AC Cars, Mercedes-Benz, Rinspeed and Wiesmann. The car, depending on the platform, is controlled via a keyboard or a gamepad. It is possible to play with a steering wheel.

== Game engine ==
World Racing 2 uses a game engine called the 3D Landscape Engine, developed in-house by Synetic. One of the distinguishing characteristics of this technology is that it works well with large open spaces. The technology also supports weather effects, dynamic shadows that change depending on lighting, shader water with waves and light refraction, and reflections on vehicles. A particle system is responsible for rendering water spray and road dust.

Later and improved versions of the engine have been used in all subsequent developments by Synetic.

== Development ==
Initially, the game was planned to focus on Volkswagen vehicles, with the W12 Concept Car gracing the European cover. Similar to the first installment, Mercedes-Benz World Racing, which focused on Mercedes-Benz cars. More details later emerged: it was revealed that World Racing 2 would also feature cars from Volkswagen subsidiaries Audi, Bentley, Lamborghini, Škoda and Seat. However, some brands were cut from the final game due to licensing issues.

The first screenshots of the game appeared in early October 2004. These depicted Volkswagen car races against a backdrop of three-dimensional natural scenery. The news article on TeamXbox website, dated 6 October 2004, aside from gameplay footage, mentioned that World Racing 2 would use an upgraded game engine from the prequel, with better shadows and lighting, as well as new mud and dust effects; and mentioned that the cars would be more elaborate, with more customisation options (i.e. the player changing the car's appearance).

The 11 November 2004 news article reported that the game would also feature the legendary English car AC Cobra produced by AC Cars from 1961 to 1967. A spokesman for the car company is also quoted as saying that the concern's employees were happy with the technological part of the game and the way the car has been recreated in virtual space.

Before the end of the year, it was reported that the game would include the possibility of applying vinyls to cars in the game, thus altering their appearance (notably, this aspect of the game was developed in conjunction with the company CFC CarFilm Components, whose speciality is vinyl production). It would also include a well-developed car damage system and feature the beauty contest winner Isabell from FHM magazine.

In late December 2004, the first World Racing 2 trailer showing off gameplay was unveiled.

At the end of February 2005, information about the game's racing locations appeared, where Egypt, Hawaii, Italy and Miami are mentioned. In April, a second video showing more gameplay appeared, and later in June, new screenshots appeared.

The game was released on 29 September 2005, and subsequently, several patches and demos were released.

On November 2, 2009, the developer Synetic unexpectedly released a patch after more than four years, resolving issues with the copy-protection driver on Windows 7. Once installed, the game can be launched without inserting the original DVD—a move that was received very positively by fans, especially since the update can also be applied on other operating systems. It also includes all bug fixes from previous patches.

== Reception ==
Reception

Aggregate score
Aggregator	Score
Metacritic	(Xbox) 47/100 (PC) 68/100

Review scores
Publication	Score
GameSpot	(Xbox) 4.1/10 (PC) 4.4/10
IGN	4.5/10
Official Xbox Magazine (UK)	5.3/10
Official Xbox Magazine (US)	5/10
PC Gamer (UK)	6.8/10
PlayStation 2 Mag	5/10
Total Video Games	7/10

The game was given mixed to negative reviews according to Metacritic.

=== Xbox ===
The Xbox version was met with mixed to negative reception.

GameSpot's reviewer Aaron Thomas said, "World Racing 2 makes a couple of key improvements on its predecessor, but it's still a substandard effort." Thomas praised the game for the impressive car damage, tracks and race models, and many improvements. Criticism included improvements not being fun, gameplay, menus, presentation, and sounds.

IGN's reviewer Douglass C. Perry said "Synetic has a basic grounding in good car physics and better-than-average artificial intelligence, which gives World Racing 2 an underlying level of quality. Unfortunately, its poor presentation, rough course design and horrific car designs add to the game's poor sense of balance and fairness." Perry liked the improvements and also the 480p resolution, but criticized the gameplay, and music. The replay system received mixed comments.

=== Windows ===
Reviews for the PC version of the game remained mixed, but were more positive. Aaron Thomas, reviewing the PC version for GameSpot, said: "World Racing 2 makes a couple of key improvements on its predecessor, but it's still a substandard effort." Nevertheless, Thomas praised the game for its impressive car damage, tracks and race models, as well as the better graphical quality compared to the Xbox version, as well as the presence of an online mode which the aforementioned version lacked.
