= Crash Time III =

2009 racing video game

- Developer: Synetic
- Publishers: EU: RTL Playtainment; NA: Zoo Games
- Platforms: Microsoft Windows, Xbox 360
- Release: 27 November 2009
- Genre: Racing
- Mode: Single-player

Alarm für Cobra 11: Highway Nights (also known as Crash Time III outside of Germany) is a racing video game developed by Synetic Games and published by RTL Playtainment. It is the third game adapted from the Alarm für Cobra 11 – Die Autobahnpolizei television series. The game was launched on 27 November 2009 for Xbox 360 and PC.

== Plot ==
Semir Gerkhan and Ben Jäger end up infiltrating terrorist activity in the city and the Autobahn. This is due to a ex-military commander named Novakov who is planning an attack on an economic conference to kill the president.

== Gameplay ==
In Crash Time III, the players not only have to complete tasks, but they have to do them as successfully as possible. All missions are rated up to five stars depending on whether the players are staying within certain limits, such as elapsed time or car damage. Not only do the stars affect gameplay, but they also affect the player's overall rating; completing the missions without receiving any stars or with a low amount of stars, the rating will be affected negatively.

There are a few things the player can do with suspects when they drive up to them on patrol, but in the missions, the player has to do a specific task with the suspect. The suspect vehicles use the pathfinder system as well, so the path they use is not the same. Outside of these missions, the game is mostly an open-world.

The missions come in different types:

- Pursuit: The goal is to chase down the suspect. The player arrests him by either shooting his car, totalling it, or using the PIT manoeuvre (hitting the back-end at the side to put the suspect into a spin.) and stopping in front of him. For some specific missions, the player can use the drone to destroy the suspect vehicle.
- Shadowing: The players must follow a suspect without making too much noise and by keeping a distance by not getting too close or too far. A suspicion meter on the top left corner decreases in the level when the player waits a while.
- Race: If this happens during a patrol, the player has to drive to a specific place and stop there before the suspect does.

The vehicles are fictitious but resemble some cars from the German manufacturers. Usually, the cars come in 3 types, and the third type of the vehicle is usually a tuned-up version. Crash Time III consists of more than 50 missions, an area of 32 square kilometres (based on Frankfurt or Munich) and Autobahn and 47 vehicles to choose from.
