= N.I.C.E. 2 =

1998 video game

- Cover art for the North American version
- Developer: Synetic GmbH
- Publishers: GER: Magic Bytes; NA: SouthPeak Interactive
- Platform: Microsoft Windows
- Release: GER: 1998; NA: June 22, 2000; EU: 2000
- Genres: Racing, role-playing
- Modes: Single-player, multiplayer

N.I.C.E. 2, known in North America as BreakNeck, is a video game developed by Synetic and published by Magic Bytes in Germany in 1998, and by SouthPeak Games in North America in 2000. It is the sequel to the racing game Have a N.I.C.E. day.

== Reception ==
Reception

Aggregate score
Aggregator	Score
Metacritic	76/100

Review scores
Publication	Score
AllGame	3.5/5
CNET Gamecenter	7/10
Computer Games Strategy Plus	3.5/5
EP Daily	8/10
Game Informer	6.25/10
GameRevolution	B+
GameSpot	6.7/10
GameSpy	85%
GameStar	88%
GameZone	7.5/10
IGN	8.2/10
Next Generation	4/5
PC Gamer (US)	53%
PC Games (DE)	87%

The game received favorable reviews according to the review aggregation website Metacritic. In his early review of the game, Doug Trueman of NextGen called it "A surprisingly well made and full-featured racer."

German magazine GameStar said, "Be that as it may; anyone who likes racing games and is interested in our rating knows what to do on the day N.I.C.E. 2 is released." Another German magazine, PC Games, said that the game "just misses the references position because the tiny errors really didn't have to be there. But even so, N.I.C.E. 2 can be thoroughy recommended!" Allen Eckles of GameSpy said, "A surprise title from Southpeak, Breakneck [sic] could be just the right thing to keep your driving aggressions off the road. Use those weapons! With all its options, the game should keep you busy, and with a $29.99 MSRP, it won't hurt your wallet either." Shawn Sparks of GameRevolution called it "a solid game with enough options and depth to keep you interested for quite awhile. If you have access to a group of friends and a LAN, this game is a must buy. If you are bored with racers that are limited in the types of cars and racing situations, then you will love the variety that this one has to offer." Scott Steiberg of IGN said, "Straddling the fence between casual time killer and detailed simulation isn't a course of action that we'd recommend to fledling developers. Breakneck pulls it off, albeit just by the skin of its teeth. Stick to the Arcade game for maximum thrills or be committed to spending hours sorting through menu screens to get to the good stuff. Stumble into the gameplay one way or another and you'll wonder why an airbag wasn't included on the list of minimum requirements." Chris Hudak of The Electric Playground said, "As a racer-inclined PC gamer, you owe it to yourself to give BreakNeck a try." Michael Lafferty of GameZone called it "an enjoyable race game, whether playing in arcade or expert mode. The courses are challenging, and the range of vehicles makes it quite a bit of fun."

Nick Smith of AllGame said that the game was "recommended for first-time entrants into the driving game genre because of its impressively rendered graphics and the novelty of its gameplay, but driving fans will get bored and frustrated very easily." Thomas McDonald of CNET Gamecenter said, "BreakNeck stands apart from the rest of the arcade racer pack by virtue of its wide array of cars, tracks, and games [sic] modes; its smooth and attractive visuals; and its effective sense of speed and excitement. Its only real flaws lie in the process of getting to all of this fun, which is a lot more complex than it should be. If you love racing games, and are fairly patient, BreakNeck is a game that you should check out." David J. Long of Computer Games Strategy Plus said, "Some games suck you in from the moment they hit your hard drive but don't sustain the fun through repeated play, becoming stale and boring. Breakneck does exactly the opposite. The first time you start it up, you'll be ready to break the neck of the developers for making it incredibly difficult to get into one stinking race. If, by an act of God, you manage to find your way onto the track within the first 10 minutes, you'll find a very entertaining arcade-style racing game." However, Amer Ajami of GameSpot called it "a racing game with a wide assortment of enjoyable tracks and cars, but it's handicapped by a poor interface and several problematic gameplay features. It's unfortunate that the game doesn't have a more robust expert mode and that the intuitive arcade interface isn't used for the whole game. Consequently, BreakNeck will be most enjoyable for players with the patience to deal with an interface that simply shouldn't exist in games anymore."

The lowest scores came from Game Informer, which gave it 6.25 out of 10, and from Andrew S. Bub of PC Gamer, who gave it 53%, saying, "People who are into thoughtful simulation racing games won't really get anything out of this, and Need for Speed more than adequately caters to the 'arcade style with realism' crowd. But for people who ask nothing more of a computer game than they be allowed to tear ass around a track and take shots at their buddies, BreakNeck gets the job done. It's hardly top-drawer game design, but not every game can be."
