= World Racing =

2003 video game

- Box art for the European PC Version
- Developer: Synetic
- Publisher: TDK Mediactive Europe
- Composers: Christian Becker, Olaf Georgi, Detlef Piepke, Nick Schreger, Bass Bumpers
- Platforms: Windows, PlayStation 2, Xbox, GameCube
- Release: Xbox: EU: 28 February 2003; NA: 20 March 2003; PlayStation 2 & Windows: EU: 19 September 2003; GameCube: EU: 8 April 2004
- Genre: Racing
- Modes: Single-player, multiplayer

World Racing is a racing simulation video game developed by the German company Synetic GmbH and published by TDK Mediactive Europe. The game was released in 2003 for Windows, PlayStation 2, Xbox, and GameCube, and only the Xbox version was released in North America. The game mainly focuses on Mercedes-Benz cars and was known during development as Mercedes-Benz World Racing. A sequel, World Racing 2, was released in 2005.

== Development ==
Initially, it was announced that the game was being developed exclusively for the Xbox console. In December 2002, the developers clarified that, with a slight delay regarding the Xbox version, World Racing would be released on other platforms, including Microsoft Windows and the PlayStation 2 and GameCube game consoles.

In 2003, after the game's release on the Xbox, the developers posted several trailers on the Internet that showed off various gameplay aspects. These included showing some of the locations and vehicles and demonstrating the ability to freely explore the map by "driving off" the race track right during the competition.

In September of the same year, players had the opportunity to download a demo version of World Racing for PC. The demo includes one track from the full version, Hockenheimring, and four Mercedes-Benz models to drive - the SLK 230 Kompressor, CLK DTM 2000, A 190 Twin and 300SL.

World Racing was eventually released on 20 March 2003 in a version for the Xbox console and a few months later, on 19 September, on the other announced gaming platforms. Notably, a year after the game's release, during development of the second instalment, Synetic GmbH placed several additional vehicles (Slipstream V8, SandHopper, Mercedes-Benz Racing Truck) on the public domain, which the user can add to the game at their discretion.

The latest patch released, measuring 3.96 MB, updates the game to version 1.6.6 and, in addition to fixing some bugs, introduces a multiplayer mode to the game.

The fan community develops newly added cars and maps for the game, which can be found on websites dedicated to the game.

== Gameplay ==
Overall, except for a few different characteristics, the gameplay of World Racing is reasonably typical of a car simulator and comparable to games such as Need for Speed: Porsche Unleashed, which is also notable for making use of only one real-world car manufacturer. One particular feature is the adjustable difficulty setting: by moving a slider on a scale from 'arcade' to 'simulation', the player selects the best option for themselves. This option affects both the vehicle's behaviour model, as well as its damageability and the artificial intelligence of the opponents.

Completing 'championships' (stages with a defined number of tracks, into which the game is divided), the user unlocks previously unavailable cars that can be raced. New championships and races are also available as the game progresses. There are 16 championships, with a total of 117 tracks and 48 different missions. The simulated tracks represent real-world terrain from various countries, such as Japan, Mexico, Australia, the Nevada desert, the Alps, and race tracks in Germany. All courses differ in terms of weather conditions, type of road surface, etc. On some courses, the player can only drive specific vehicles, such as off-road vehicles. Also noteworthy is Free Ride mode, in which the player can move freely around the map.

There are 127 licensed Mercedes-Benz models in the game, with physical models and appearances closely resembling their real-life equivalents. Among the cars involved, in addition to modern models, are cars considered "classic" (for example, the Mercedes-Benz W125). The cars' colour and some of the options that affect their on-road behaviour can be changed. There is an option in the game to close or open the roof on convertible cars.

The multiplayer mode, which is introduced with the patch to version 1.6.6, allows players to compete against each other over a local network or internet connection. The game also features a two-player split-screen.

Downloadable cars made by developers:
Four more vehicles (two not "licensed") have been added to the game in the form of add-ons - the Aston Martin DB5, the Mercedes-Benz Race Truck (racing truck, carried over from Mercedes-Benz Truck Racing), Slipstream V8 (muscle car resembling a second generation Buick Riviera) and SandHopper ATV 7000S (sand buggy).

== Reception ==
Xbox reviews

Aggregate score
Aggregator	Score
Metacritic	56/100

Review scores
Publication	Score
Eurogamer	6/10
Game Informer	5/10
GameSpot	4.9/10
GameZone	7.8/10
IGN	7/10
Official Xbox Magazine (UK)	6.8/10
Official Xbox Magazine (US)	7.4/10

Other reviews

Review scores
Publication	Score
Computer and Video Games	5.4/10
GamesMaster	4.9/10
PC Gamer (UK)	5.2/10
Play	28%
N-Europe	5/10
PlayStation 2 Mag	5/10
PlayStation 2 Max	5.2/10

When the game was first released on Xbox, it received mixed reviews. They were similar or worse reviews to other platforms.

Reviewing for the Xbox, GameSpot's reviewer Matthew Gallant said "It's not a stunningly accurate sim, it doesn't provide the sort of overview of Mercedes-Benz cars that you'd expect, and its graphical presentation has more than a few flaws." IGN's reviewer Justin Thompson said "The ability to leave the game's tracks and explore its massive environments, however, gives it a relaxing quality that's surprisingly refreshing." Official Xbox Magazine said "With 110 cars, seven stupidly gigantic courses, amazing (if arcadey) graphics, and staggering freedom of movement (once you unlock free roam modes), it's hard not to recommend this."

A European reviewer on Xbox, Tom Bramwell, who was reviewing at the time for Eurogamer, said "It's too hard, it's a bit feebly constructed in places, and it plays too much like real driving, which, for a game laden with UFOs, is a bit of a contradiction."

Reviewing for the PlayStation 2, PlayStation 2 Mag gave it a 5/10, and PlayStation 2 Max gave the game 5.2/10, giving the game mixed reviews. However, Play UK was very negative and gave it 28%.

Reviewing for the GameCube, N-Europe gave the game 5/10.

Reviewing for the PC, CVG gave it 5.4/10, and PC Gamer gave the game 5.2/10
