= Synetic GmbH =

German video game company

- Company type: GmbH
- Industry: Video games
- Founded: 1996; 30 years ago Gütersloh, North Rhine-Westphalia, Germany
- Defunct: 6 May 2014
- Fate: Liquidated
- Successor: Vitrios GmbH
- Headquarters: Gütersloh, North Rhine-Westphalia, Germany
- Products: World Racing series Alarm für Cobra 11 video game adaptations

Synetic GmbH was a German video game company specialising in racing games. The company was founded in 1996, in Gütersloh by five former members of Ascaron. All five original members were still working for the company until the company was liquidated on 6 May 2014. Although the company with its team of eight employees was rather small and its games are virtually unknown outside of Germany, their titles are among the most popular racing games in Germany and are consistently among Germany's best-selling games.

While originally only developing games for Windows PCs, Synetic's later releases (starting with 2003's Mercedes Benz World Racing) were also available for a selection of consoles.

On 31 March 2014, Synetic ceased the production of video games.

== Games ==
Year	Title	Platform(s)	Notes
1997	Have a N.I.C.E. Day!	Microsoft Windows	
1998	N.I.C.E. 2	Microsoft Windows	Released in North America as Breakneck.
2000	Mercedes-Benz Truck Racing	Microsoft Windows	
2003	Mercedes-Benz World Racing	Microsoft Windows, PlayStation 2, Xbox, GameCube	
2005	World Racing 2	Microsoft Windows, PlayStation 2, Xbox	
2006	Alarm für Cobra 11: Nitro	Microsoft Windows	Released as Alarm for Cobra 11: Nitro in the UK.
2007	Alarm für Cobra 11: Crash Time	Microsoft Windows, Xbox 360	Released as Alarm for Cobra 11: Crash Time in the UK and Crash Time: Autobahn Pursuit in North America (Xbox 360 only).
2008	Alarm für Cobra 11: Burning Wheels	Microsoft Windows, Xbox 360	Released as Crash Time II in English-speaking countries and Autobahn Polizei in North America (Xbox 360 only).
2009	Ferrari Virtual Race	Microsoft Windows	
2009	Alarm für Cobra 11: Highway Nights	Microsoft Windows, Xbox 360	Released as Crash Time III in English-speaking countries.
2010	Alarm für Cobra 11: Das Syndikat	Microsoft Windows, Xbox 360, PlayStation 3	Released as Crash Time 4: The Syndicate in English-speaking countries.
2012	Alarm für Cobra 11: Undercover	Microsoft Windows, Xbox 360, PlayStation 3	Released as Crash Time 5: Undercover in English-speaking countries.
2013	Sunny Hillride	Android, iOS	
