= Carolina Gómez =

Colombian actress, presenter and model (born 1976)

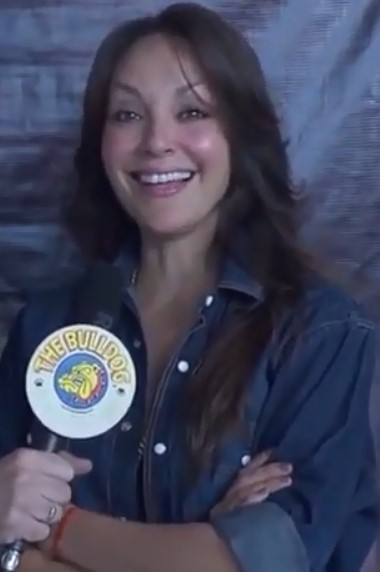
- Gómez in 2012
- Born: Carolina Gómez Correa; 26 February 1976 (age 50); Cali, Cauca Valley, Colombia
- Height: 1.76 m (5 ft 9 in)
- Spouses: Nicolás Hoyos (m. 1996; div. 1999) Jaime Sánchez Cristo (m. 2002; div. 2008) Borja Aguirre (m. 2013; div. 2021)
- Children: 1
- Beauty pageant titleholder
- Title: Miss Bogotá 1993; Miss Colombia 1993
- Hair color: Brown
- Eye color: Hazel
- Major competitions: Miss Colombia 1993 (Winner); Miss Universe 1994 (1st Runner-Up)

Carolina Gómez Correa (born 26 February 1976) is a Colombian actress, TV host, model and beauty pageant titleholder who was crowned Miss Colombia 1993 and placed 1st runner-up at Miss Universe 1994.

== Pageantry ==
=== Señorita Colombia ===
She won the Miss Colombia title in 1993 representing Bogotá She was crowned at the age of 18, having graduated from Colegio Nueva Granada.

=== Miss Universe ===
She entered the Miss Universe 1994 pageant where she finished as 1st runner-up; Carolina Gómez was the third Colombian to be the 1st runner-up in a row at the Miss Universe competition, after Paola Turbay in 1992 and Paula Andrea Betancur in 1993.

== Career ==
After her reign, Gómez went into modeling, achieving success on runways in Italy and Miami. She was the host of "Stars", a television show where many artists and celebrities were interviewed; afterwards, she was the successor to Jaime Garzón in the show "Locos Videos". She was also a TV Producer, as such, she was co-chair of Vista Productions Inc. In 2004, she made her acting debut in a soap opera, "El Auténtico Rodrigo Leal", telecasted by Caracol Channel (in Colombia), where she had the role of the host of a TV Reality Program with the Argentinian actor Martín Karpan. Her acting in this role received excellent reviews, which led to her role as protagonist in "La Viuda de la Mafía", another soap opera which aired in 2006 in RCN Channel (another Colombian Channel). Between 2007 and 2010 she worked in different TV series such as Mujeres Asesinas, Sin Retorno, Tiempo Final and Karabudjan. The latter was a 6-hour miniseries for Antena 3 in Spain. Currently, she played Alicia Duran in A corazón abierto, the Colombian adaptation of Grey's Anatomy. Most recently she was seen in the hit Apple TV show "Acapulco" where she plays the older version of one the main characters, Julia.

She has also starred in several films, including director Felipe Martínez Amador's feature film Bluff, with Catalina Aristizábal, Víctor Mallarino, and Luis Eduardo Arango, amongst others. The film, which premiered in March 2007, had very good reviews and very high box office revenues in Colombia. In 2010, she traveled to Los Angeles to co-star in the film The Chosen One along with comedian Rob Schneider (who also wrote and directed the movie). Her successful career led her to work in Federal, a Brazilian action film with Michael Madsen, Saluda al diablo de mi parte along with Edgar Ramírez, and most recently: El paseo, a family road trip comedy shot in the Colombian countryside.

== Filmography ==
=== Films ===
- #RealityHigh (2017)
- Adelaida (2014)
- La Lectora (2012)
- Greetings to the Devil (2011)
- The Chosen One (2010)
- Federal (2010)
- El Paseo (2010)
- Bluff (2007)
- Martinis al atardecer (2004)

=== Television ===
- Acapulco (2021 TV series) (2024)
- Ventino: El precio de la gloria (2023)
- Her Mother's Killer (2020)
- El Barón (2019)
- Seal Team (2018)
- Sangre de mi tierra (2017-2018)
- Lucifer (2016)
- Bloque de búsqueda (2016)
- Los hombres también lloran (2014)
- Mentiras perfectas (2013)
- La Teacher de Ingles (2011)
- A corazón abierto (2010)
- Karabudjan (2010)
- Amas de casa desesperadas (Season 2) (2010)
- Tiempo final (2009)
- Sin retorno (2008)
- Mujeres Asesinas (2007)
- Marido a Sueldo (2007)
- La viuda de la mafia (2004)
- El auténtico Rodrigo Leal (2003)
- Decisiones

Awards and achievements
Preceded by (Colombia) Paula Andrea Betancur	Miss Universe 1st Runner-Up; 1994	Succeeded by (India) Manpreet Brar
Preceded by Paula Andrea Betancur	Miss Colombia; 1993	Succeeded by Tatiana Castro
