= The Last Cop (film) =

- Theatrical release poster
- Directed by: Peter Thorwarth
- Written by: Peter Thorwarth; Stefan Holtz
- Based on: The Last Cop by: Robert Dannenberg; Stefan Scheich
- Produced by: Christian Becker
- Starring: Henning Baum; Maximilian Grill; Florence Kasumba; Ralf Moeller
- Cinematography: Christian Stangassinger
- Edited by: Martin Wolf; Milos Savic
- Music by: Hendrik Nölle; Moritz Busch
- Production companies: Westside Filmproduktion; Warner Bros. Film Productions Germany; SevenPictures Film; Donar Film
- Distributed by: Warner Bros. Pictures
- Release date: 7 November 2019
- Running time: 101 minutes
- Country: Germany
- Language: German

The Last Cop (German: Der letzte Bulle) is a 2019 German action comedy film directed by Peter Thorwarth. It is an adaptation of The Last Cop TV series with Henning Baum reprising his role as Mick Brisgau.

== Cast ==
- Henning Baum as Mick Brisgau
- Maximilian Grill as Andreas Kringge
- Florence Kasumba as Kriemhild Magunda
- Lucas Gregorowicz as Kaminski
- Ralph Herforth as Müller
- Ralf Moeller as Ralle
- Christian Kahrmann as Kirchhoff
- Oliver Fleischer as Püttmann
- Sonsee Neu as Lisa
