= Christian Becker =

German film producer (born 1972)

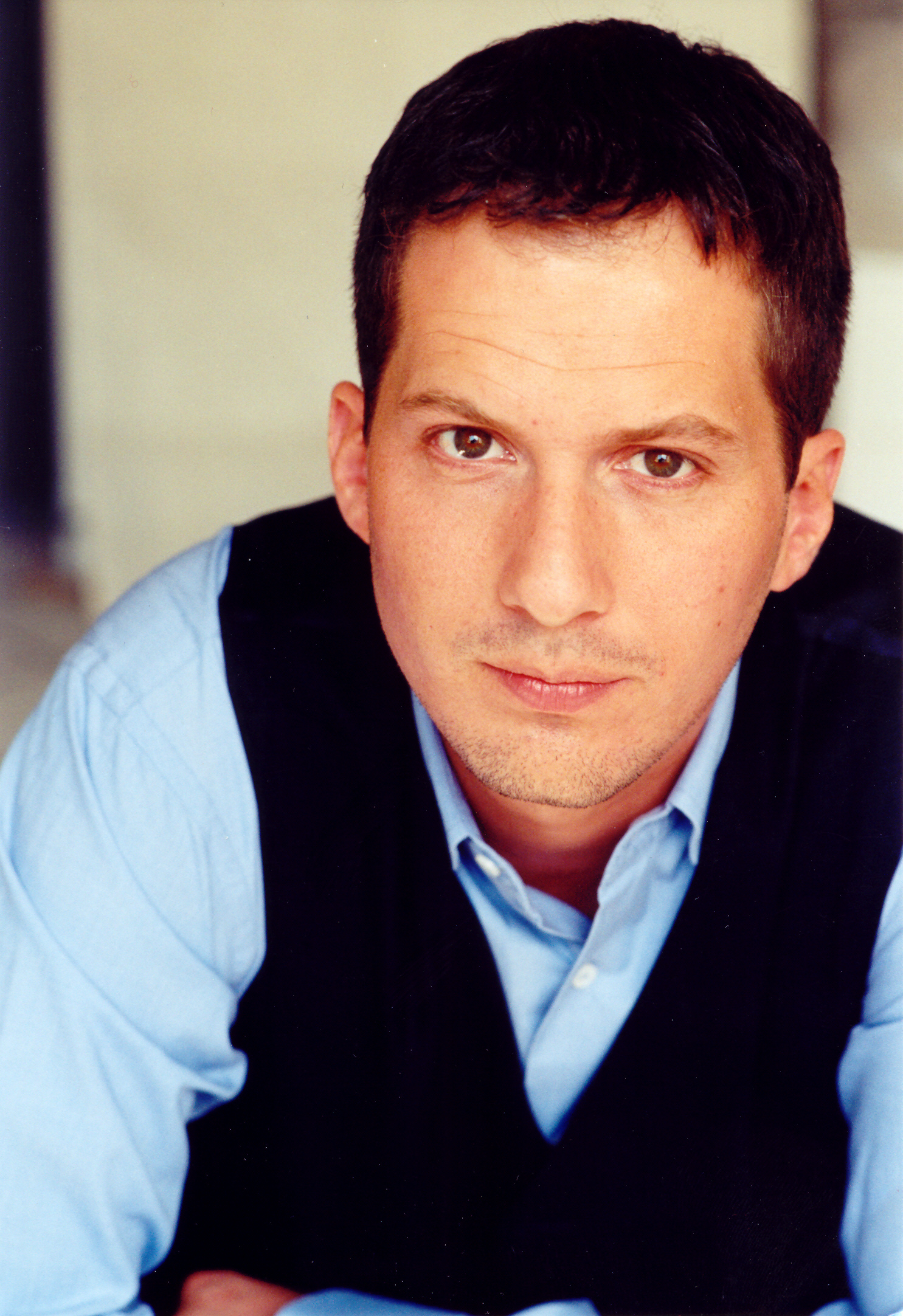
- Born: 1972 (age 53–54); Krefeld, West Germany
- Occupation: Producer
- Years active: 1990–present

Christian Becker (born 1972, Krefeld) is a German film producer. He is the co-owner of Rat Pack Filmproduktion together with German major studio Constantin Film.

== Biography ==
After working in the film business for many years, he enrolled at the University of Television and Film Munich in 1994, where he went on to produce over 15 short films, commercials and documentaries, including the shorts The Wrong Trip and Living Dead by directing student Dennis Gansel, and shorts by their mutual friend and fellow student Peter Thorwarth If It Don't Fit, Use a Bigger Hammer and Mafia, Pizza, Razzia. He also produced graduating films like Benjamin Herrmann's The Big Laugh based on the Henry Slesar short story and Student Oscar winner Quiero ser (I want to be...) by Florian Gallenberger. No student in the history of Munich Film School has ever produced as many student films as Christian Becker.

In 1997, Becker founded Indigo Filmproduktion and Becker & Haeberle Filmproduktion together with partner Thomas Haeberle, with which he produced Dennis Gansel's TV movie Das Phantom, or Thorwarth's theatrical cult features Bang Boom Bang and If It Don't Fit, Use a Bigger Hammer. After follow-ups including Kanak Attack based on Feridun Zaimoğlu's novel and Seven Days to Live, Becker was one of the most successful producers in the German industry at the age of 28. In August 2000, Becker and Häberle folded their production shingle into the entertainment conglom they co-founded, F.A.M.E. AG, and went public on Germany's Neuer Markt. In 2001, Christian Becker left Indigo and Becker & Häberle, going on to found Rat Pack Filmproduktion and Westside Filmproduktion together with leading German distrib Constantin Film and his close-knit band of filmmaking pros.

== Filmography ==
Feature Films

- Blood Red Sky (2021) (producer)
- The Last Cop (2019) (producer)
- Jim Button and Luke the Engine Driver (2018) (producer)
- Offline: Are You Ready for the Next Level? (2016) (producer)
- Fack ju Göhte (2013) (producer)
- Turkish for Beginners / Türkisch für Anfänger (2012) (producer)
- Vicky and the Treasure of the Gods (2011)
- We Are The Night (2010) (producer)
- Jerry Cotton (2010) (producer)
- Zeiten ändern dich (2010) (producer)
- The Crocodiles Strike Back / Vorstadtkrokodile 2 (2010) (producer)
- The Legend of Loch Ness / Die Legende von Loch Ness (2010) (TV) (producer)
- The Funny Fairytales / Die ProSieben Märchenstunde (producer) (16 episodes, 2006–2009)
- Vicky the Viking / Wickie und die starken Männer (2009) (producer)
- The Crocodiles / Vorstadtkrokodile (2009) (producer)
- Killing is my business, honey / Mord ist mein Geschäft, Liebling (2009) (producer)
- ProSieben Funny Movies (2008) (TV) (producer)
- The Secret of Loch Ness / Das Wunder von Loch Ness (2008) (TV) (producer)
- The Wave (2008) (producer)
- Darkness / Nachts – Geschichten aus der Dunkelheit (2008) TV series (producer)
- Lotta in Love (2006/2007) (Telenovela) (producer)
- The Vexxer / Neues vom Wixxer (2007) (producer)
- If it don't fit, use a bigger hammer / Was nicht passt, wird passend gemacht (producer) (TV series, 3 seasons, 2005–2009)
- Hui Buh: The Goofy Ghost / Hui Buh – Das Schlossgespenst (2006) (producer)
- French for Beginners / Französisch für Anfänger (2006) (co-producer)
- Kiss me Kismet / Meine verrückte türkische Hochzeit (2006) (TV) (producer)
- Out of Bounds / Goldene Zeiten (2006) (producer)
- Full Throttle / Vollgas – Gebremst wird später (2005) (TV) (producer)
- Ich bin ein Berliner (2005) (TV) (producer)
- Blood of the Templars / Das Blut der Templer (2004) (TV) (producer)
- Scratch: The New Sound of Terror / Ratten 2 – Sie kommen wieder! (2004) (TV) (producer)
- The TriXXer / Der Wixxer (2004) (producer)
- Jazzclub – Der frühe Vogel fängt den Wurm (2004) (producer)
- Girl No.1 / Mädchen Nr. 1 (2003) (TV) (co-producer)
- Nikos the Impaler / Nikos (2003) (V) (producer)
- The Hunt for the Hidden Relic / Das Jesus Video (2002) (TV) (producer)
- Cuba Libre / Kubaner küssen besser (2002) (TV) (producer)
- If It Don't Fit, Use a Bigger Hammer (2002) (producer)
- Turkish Delights / Alles getürkt! (2002) (TV) (producer)
- Revenge of the Rats / Ratten – sie werden dich kriegen! (2001) (TV) (producer)
- A Fine Romance / Sind denn alle netten Männer schwul (2001) (TV) (producer)
- One wedding and no funeral / Eine Hochzeit und (k)ein Todesfall (2001) (TV) (producer)
- Kanak Attack (2000) (producer)
- Seven Days to Live (2000) (producer)
- Das Phantom (2000) (TV) (producer)
- Josephine (2000) (producer)
- Biikenbrennen – Der Fluch des Meeres (1999) (TV) (producer)
- Bang Boom Bang / Bang Boom Bang – Ein todsicheres (1999) (producer)
- Our Island in the South Pacific / Südsee, eigene Insel (1999) (producer)

Short Films

- Kismet (2000) (executive producer)
- Quiero ser (I want to be ...) (2000) (executive producer)
- Operation Bluebird (1999) (co-producer)
- Living Dead (1998) (producer)
- Mafia, Pizza, Razzia (1997) (producer)
- Die letzte Sekunde (1997) (co-producer)
- Drachenträume (1997) (producer)
- Was nicht paßt, wird passend gemacht (1997) (producer)
- Fools and Heroes (1997) (supervising producer)
- Der große Lacher (1997) (producer)
- Die rote Waschmaschine (1997) (producer)
- One Night Suicide (1996) (producer)
- Der Tote vom anderen Ufer (1996) (line producer)
- Kreuz & quer (1995) (supervising producer)
- The Wrong Trip (1995) (producer)

== Movie productions ==
Under the Rat Pack label, Christian Becker again had a remarkable string of successes, producing hit made-for-TV action-adventure The Hunt for the Hidden Relic (Jesus Video) based on Andreas Eschbach's bestseller, two seasons of the series spin-off Was nicht passt, wird passend gemacht (If it don't fit, use a bigger hammer), Rats 2, and mystic actioner Blood of the Templars.

His theatrical features include box-office smash Hammer-style Edgar Wallace spoof The TriXXer (Der WiXXer), which sold a total of 3 million tickets with the sequel The VeXXer (Neues vom Wixxer), as well as Peter Thorwarth's satire Out of Bounds (2004) starring Dirk Benedict, hit kidpic Hui Buh - The Goofy Ghost (2005) and Dennis Gansel's Sundance entry and European box-office smash The Wave (Die Welle) (2008).

2009 saw the release of hit kidpic Max von der Grün's The Crocodiles, the screwball gangster comedy Mord ist mein Geschäft, Liebling (Killing is my business, honey), starring Rick Kavanian and Christian Tramitz as well as European film legends Bud Spencer and Franco Nero.

He also produced the most successful German box office hit 2009 Vicky the Viking by director Michael Bully Herbig; the film made nearly 5 million admissions in Germany only with a total gross revenue of approximately $40,582,384.

== Awards and nominations (Excerpts) ==
Won

- 2009: German Comedy Awards Most Successful Picture – Vicky the Viking
- 2008: German Film Awards Best Picture/ Bronze – The Wave
- 1999: Bavarian Film Award/ VFF for Best New Producer – Bang Boom Bang

Nominated

- 2006: German Comedy Awards Best Comedy Series – for: "Die ProSieben Märchenstunde"
- 2005: German Comedy Awards Best Comedy Series – for: "Kalkofes Mattscheibe"
- 2004: German Comedy Awards Best Comedy Series – for: "Was nicht passt wird passend gemacht – Die Serie"
