= Miss Colombia 1992 =

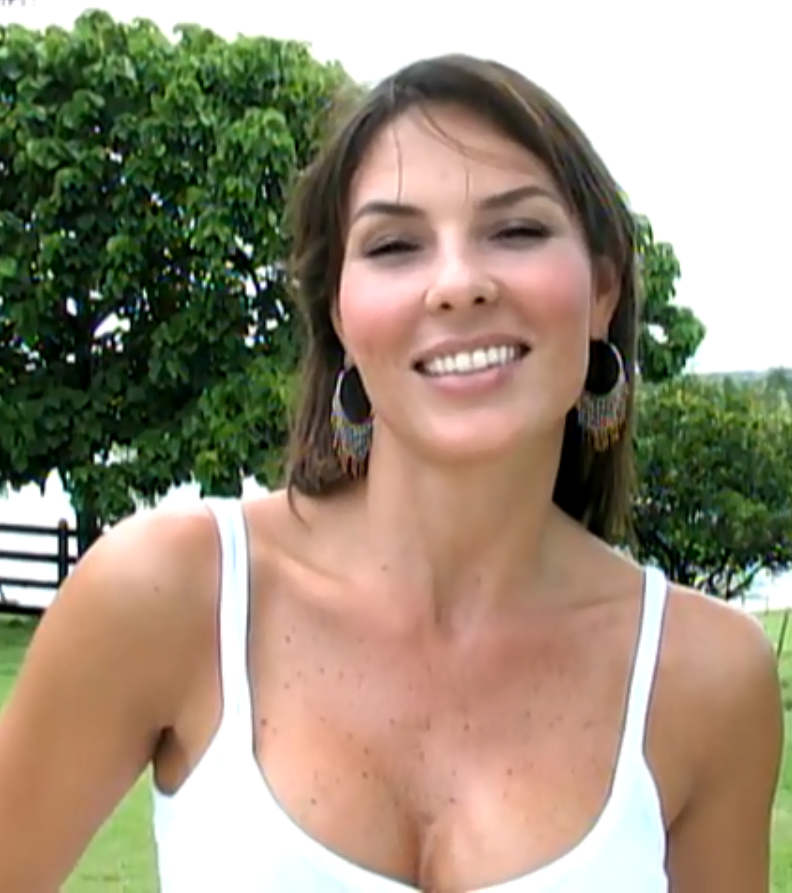
- Paula Andrea Betancur, Miss Colombia 1992
- Date: November 16, 1992
- Presenters: Fernando Allende, Pilar Castaño
- Venue: Cartagena de Indias, Colombia
- Broadcaster: RCN
- Entrants: 28
- Debuts: Guaviare; Vichada
- Withdrawals: Nariño; Quindio; Risaralda; Tolima
- Returns: Amazonas; Caquetá; Cauca; Meta
- Winner: Paula Andrea Betancur; Amazonas
- Congeniality: Claudia Marcela Devia; Guaviare
- Best National Costume: Luz Soraida Pérez; Antioquia

Miss Colombia 1992 was the 44th edition of the Miss Colombia pageant. According to tradition, it was celebrated in Cartagena de Indias, within the framework of the Independence of Cartagena on November 16, 1992.

At the end of the event, Paula Andrea Betancur of Amazonas was crowned by Paola Turbay of Bogotá at the event's conclusion. This is the first and so far only time that Amazonas won the pageant.

== Results ==
=== Placements ===
Placement	Contestant
Miss Colombia 1992	Amazonas – Paula Andrea Betancur
1st Runner-Up	Bogotá – Katherine Saenz
2nd Runner-Up	Caquetá – Catherine Duran
3rd Runner-Up	Caldas – Patricia Arango Londoño
4th Runner-Up	Antioquia – Luz Soraida Pérez

== Contestants ==
28 candidates were selected to compete in this edition.

Representing	Name
Amazonas	Paula Andrea Betancur
(Antioquia Department) Antioquia	Luz Zoraida Pérez Olarte
(Atlántico Department) Atlántico	Bibiana Lucía Martínez Márquez
Bogotá	Katherine "Kathy" Sáenz Herrera
Bolívar	Ana María Trujillo del Castillo
(Boyacá Department) Boyacá	Carmen Johanna Ocampo Pinzón
(Caldas Department) Caldas	Patricia Arango Londoño
(Caquetá Department) Caquetá	Catherine Durán Reina
(Casanare Department) Casanare	Luz Karyme Galeano Rojas
(Cauca Department) Cauca	Mónica Rodríguez Cháves
(Cesar Department) Cesar	Lina María Pavajeau Moscote
(Chocó Department) Chocó	Lía Magaly Caicedo Sánchez
Córdoba	Claudia Patricia Henao Marín
(Cundinamarca Department) Cundinamarca	María Ángela González Luque
Guainía	Yorely Castañeda Pineda
(La Guajira Department) Guajira	María Nelly Contreras Marulanda
(Guaviare Department) Guaviare	Claudia Marcela Devia Rodríguez
(Huila Department) Huila	Solbeny Milena Salazar Jiménez
(Magdalena Department) Magdalena	Margarita Cecilia Meyer Arévalo
(Meta Department) Meta	Luz Adriana Gutiérrez Salguero
(Norte de Santander Department) Norte de Santander	Claudia Patricia Prado Romero
(Putumayo Department) Putumayo	Luz Marina Acuña Chuchoque
(Archipelago of San Andrés, Providencia and Santa Catalina) San Andrés y Providencia	Sharon Elizabeth Naranjo Tobar
Santander	Claudia Patricia Reyes Mesa
Sucre	Angélica María Vallejo Villalba
(Valle del Cauca Department) Valle	Lina Fernanda Restrepo Calle
Vaupés	Claudia Marcela Pérez Claro
(Vichada Department) Vichada	Vianny Figueroa Ramírez
