= Mentiras perfectas =

2013 Colombian drama television series

- Genre: Telenovela; Medical drama; Thriller
- Created by: Ryan Murphy
- Based on: Nip/Tuck by Ryan Murphy
- Starring: Carolina Gómez; Emmanuel Esparza; Michel Brown
- Original language: Spanish
- No. of seasons: 1
- No. of episodes: 58

Production
- Camera setup: Single-camera
- Production companies: Caracol Televisión; Teleamazonas; Warner Bros. Television

Original release
- Network: Caracol Televisión; Teleamazonas
- Release: October 28, 2013 – January 24, 2014

Related
- Nip/Tuck

Mentiras perfectas is a Colombian medical drama television series created by Ryan Murphy that premiered on Caracol Televisión on October 28, 2013, and concluded on January 24, 2014. Produced by Caracol Televisión in co-production with Warner Bros. Television and Teleamazonas. The series is based on the American drama Nip/Tuck created by Ryan Murphy, and it stars Carolina Gómez, Emmanuel Esparza and Michel Brown.

== Cast ==
- Carolina Gómez as Julia Pombo
- Emmanuel Esparza as Cristóbal Alzate
- Michel Brown as Santiago Ucrós
- Javier Ramírez Espinosa es Matías Ucrós
- Manuela González as Catalina Uribe
- Natasha Klauss as Alicia María Rivera
- Andrea López as Kimberly Jones
- Ana María Kamper as Gloria de Arciniegas
- Paola Turbay as Susana Lara
- Róbinson Díaz as Mario Quintero
- Laura Ramos as Johana Cruz
- Norma Nivia as Carla Mojica
- Miguel González as Nelson
- Cristian Ruiz as Sergio "Yeyo" Gonzáles Lara
- Laura Torres as Lucía
