= Ventino: El precio de la gloria =

Colombian telenovela

- Genre: Telenovela
- Created by: Jhonny Ortiz
- Written by: Jhonny Ortiz; Karen Rodríguez; Adriana Barreto; Gustavo Salcedo
- Directed by: Jorge Navas; Rodolfo Hoyos Vivas
- Starring: Natalia Afanador; Makis de Angulo; Camila Esguerra; Olga Lucía Vives; Carolina Gómez
- Theme music composer: Natalia Afanador; Makis de Angulo; Camila Esguerra; Olga Lucía Vives; Santiago Deluchi
- Opening theme: "Qué Facil" by Ventino
- Composers: Nicolás Uribe; Sebastián Luengas
- Country of origin: Colombia
- Original language: Spanish
- No. of seasons: 1
- No. of episodes: 60

Production
- Executive producer: Manuel Peñaloza
- Editor: José Luis Oróstegui
- Production company: Caracol Televisión

Original release
- Network: Caracol Televisión
- Release: 1 March – 30 May 2023

Ventino: El precio de la gloria (English: The Price of Glory, Ventino) is a Colombian telenovela created by Jhonny Ortiz. It aired on Caracol Televisión from 1 March 2023 to 30 May 2023. The series follows four singers who on their path to fame, will have to overcome several obstacles including their manager, who is willing to step over anyone who attempts to overshadow her. It stars Natalia Afanador, Makis de Angulo, Camila Esguerra, Olga Lucía Vives and Carolina Gómez.

== Plot ==
Martina Pumarejo (Carolina Gómez) is an ambitious woman who, after sleeping with her best friend's boyfriend, becomes pregnant. In order to protect her reputation, she gives birth alone, abandons her daughter and goes ahead with her life. Twenty years later, Martina has become a music producer and the renowned judge of a reality show. One day she meets Natalia, a young singer who publicly accuses her of being a tyrant. As a lesson for Natalia, Martina devises a plan of revenge that has at its center a musical girl group whom she will use as an excuse to humiliate and destroy her.

== Cast ==
=== Main ===
- Natalia Afanador as Natalia
- Makis de Angulo as María Cristina "Makis"
- Camila Esguerra as Camila
- Olga Lucía Vives as Olga
- Carolina Gómez as Martina Pumarejo
  - Catalina Polo as young Martina
- José Ramón Barreto as Manolo Cano
- César Mora as Adolfo Cano
- Sandra Reyes as Amanda Afanador
- Katherine Vélez as María Mercedes "Merce" García
- Juan Felipe Samper as Renato Lopera
- Elkin Díaz as Ernesto
- Anderson Hernández Munera as Alex Cano
- Esteban Díaz as Jaime Vives
- Mariana Mozo as Ana Vives

=== Recurring and guest stars ===
- Yulu Pedraza
- Conrado Alonso Osorio
- Sebastián Moya
- David Nicolás Lancheros
- Gustavo Giraldo
- Antonia Arbeláez
- Antonio Puentes
- Laura Herrera
- Santiago Heins
- Billy Heins
- William Aguirre Aristizábal
- Carlos Miguel Carballo
- Miguel González
- Fernanda González
- Zoe Gabriela Beltrán Medina
- Indhira Serrano
- Mario Lora Martínez
- Samuel Montalvo
- Jacobo Montalvo
- Jorge Hugo Marín

== Production ==
In June 2022, it was announced that production had begun on Ventino, with the plot being inspired by the girl group of the same name.

== Episodes ==
No.	Title	Original release date	Colombia viewers (Rating points)
1	"Martina abandona a su hija, pero los juegos del destino la sorprenderán en el futuro"	1 March 2023	5.1
2	"Martina pone en marcha su plan para vengarse de Natalia"	2 March 2023	5.2
3	"Manolo se ve obligado a confesarle a su padre la verdad sobre porqué su hermano está en la cárcel"	3 March 2023	4.8
4	"Merce considera que Natalia es quien realmente está atormentando a Martina"	6 March 2023	5.0
5	"¿Hacen las paces? Martina le hace una interesante propuesta a Natalia"	7 March 2023	5.0
6	"El viaje a México de Natalia y Manolo está en riesgo"	8 March 2023	4.8
7	"La maldad de Martina no conoce límites, pues por sus órdenes un hombre es asesinado"	9 March 2023	5.0
8	"Natalia se sincera con su mamá y decide contarle qué sucedió en su llegada a México"	10 March 2023	4.4
9	"Camila se revela ante Luis Carlos y le asegura que se reunirá con Martina"	13 March 2023	4.3
10	"Manolo recibe buenas noticias de su hermano al finalizar el motín que hubo en la cárcel"	14 March 2023	4.9
11	"Natalia descubre que le han ocultado la grave enfermedad que tiene su mamá"	15 March 2023	4.8
12	"Makis y Camila discuten porque no soportan sus diferencias, así que Renato debe intervenir"	16 March 2023	4.9
13	"Makis se disculpa con Camila después de discutir previamente a un ensayo"	17 March 2023	4.3
14	"Ana, hermana de Olga Vives se encuentra en problemas tras su llegada al nuevo colegio"	21 March 2023	4.8
15	"Natalia le pide explicaciones a Manolo sobre los rumores de un romance con Martina"	22 March 2023	5.3
16	"Las integrantes de Ventino se presentan por primera vez con su proyecto musical"	23 March 2023	5.4
17	"Makis acepta la invitación de Renato sin saber que esta es una trampa de Martina"	24 March 2023	4.9
18	"Martina Pumarejo ayuda a Makis a salir de la Estación de Policía"	27 March 2023	5.0
19	"Martina habla con Amanda, pero no le cuenta la verdad de su embarazo"	28 March 2023	4.6
20	"Camila intenta ganar la confianza de Manolo, aunque a Natalia y Olga no le agrade esto"	29 March 2023	5.4
21	"La preferencia de Martina hacia Natalia provoca celos y desata una pelea entre las cantantes"	30 March 2023	5.1
22	"Martina concreta el viaje de Amanda a Estados Unidos, mientras que la mamá de Camila sufre una sobredosis"	31 March 2023	4.0
23	"¿Natalia llegará a la verdad de todo? La cantante descubre que Martina pagará el tratamiento de su madre"	3 April 2023	5.4
24	"Martina logra que Amanda viaje a Boston, pero allí ella se lleva una gran sorpresa"	4 April 2023	4.3
25	"Los problemas familiares generan apuros en las miembros de Calypso"	5 April 2023	4.0
26	"Martina tiene una nueva pesadilla con Natalia, ¿cuándo pararán?"	10 April 2023	4.7
27	"El plan de Martina con Makis y Miguel funciona a la perfección"	11 April 2023	4.7
28	"Amanda regresa junto a Mauricio y Natalia no lo toma a bien"	12 April 2023	4.5
29	"Martina chantajea a Camila para que no renuncie al grupo musical"	13 April 2023	5.1
30	"Rosalía le pide una oportunidad a Ernesto y le canta una canción en público"	14 April 2023	4.8
31	"Olga pasa la noche junto a Renato y deciden mantenerlo en secreto para evitar problemas"	17 April 2023	4.6
32	"Olga debe elegir entre Calypso o sus hermanos"	18 April 2023	4.9
33	"Martina no aguanta más y se enfrenta a las integrantes de Calypso"	19 April 2023	4.9
34	"Martina es secuestrada y Ernesto es detenido frente a Rosalía"	20 April 2023	4.7
35	"Calypso se une para ayudar a Olga y Rosalía tiene cada vez más problemas"	21 April 2023	5.2
36	"Manolo se aferra a tratar de evitar cumplir con la venganza de Martina"	24 April 2023	4.6
37	"Manolo y Natalia llegan al altar, pero él sigue dudando en cumplir con su parte del trato"	25 April 2023	5.1
38	"Manolo y Alex le cuentan toda la verdad a su padre sobre los planes de Martina"	26 April 2023	5.7
39	"Martina le cuenta a Natalia todo sobre su relación con Manolo y le rompe el corazón"	27 April 2023	5.2
40	"Amanda muere y Martina no se detendrá hasta ver a Natalia destruida"	28 April 2023	5.2
41	"Tras ver una entrevista de Martina, Natalia se niega a seguir siendo humillada por ella y por Manolo"	2 May 2023	5.5
42	"Natalia Afanador es drogada y secuestrada por un misterioso hombre"	3 May 2023	5.0
43	"Natalia corre peligro al ser involucrada con lo que le sucedió a Martina, ¿habrá justicia?"	4 May 2023	4.7
44	"Camila le cuenta a su papá sobre las sospechas que tiene hacia Martina"	5 May 2023	5.1
45	"Martina Pumarejo se despierta en la clínica luego de recibir dos disparos"	8 May 2023	5.6
46	"Olga Lucía está convencida de la inocencia de Natalia, pero Makis y Camila no"	9 May 2023	5.8
47	"Manolo le dice a Natalia que está dispuesto a asumir la paternidad del bebé"	10 May 2023	5.1
48	"Manolo le reclama a Natalia por la cercanía que tiene con Mauricio"	11 May 2023	5.5
49	"Manolo pone en marcha su plan para acercarse a Martina Pumarejo"	12 May 2023	5.1
50	"Natalia se escapa de las garras de Martina a pesar de sus engaños"	15 May 2023	5.6
51	"Sin saberlo, Ernesto está muy cerca del rastro de Natalia"	16 May 2023	5.4
52	"Tras la captura de Natalia, Martina se entera de que la cantante está embaraza"	17 May 2023	5.1
53	"Martina visita a Natalia en la cárcel: la cantante le asegura que no cree en sus mentiras"	18 May 2023	5.2
54	"Olga y Camila se meten de lleno en Ventino como una forma de seguir sus propios sueños"	19 May 2023	5.4
55	"Manolo y Alex avanzan en su plan para desenmascarar a Ernesto"	23 May 2023	5.5
56	"Natalia es liberada y los planes de Martina empiezan a tambalear"	24 May 2023	5.0
57	"Natalia avanza con Ventino, pero Ernesto y Martina tienen un as bajo la manga"	25 May 2023	5.7
58	"Merce le pide a Natalia que cancele la presentación de Ventino"	26 May 2023	5.5
59	"El secreto de Martina sale a la luz y Natalia se entera de la verdad"	29 May 2023	6.2
60	"Natalia finalmente le dice a Martina que sabe que es su mamá y la saca de su vida"	30 May 2023	6.5

== Reception ==
=== Ratings ===
Season	Timeslot (COT)	Episodes	First aired		Last aired		Avg. viewers (in points)
Season	Timeslot (COT)	Episodes	Date	Viewers (in points)	Date	Viewers (in points)	Avg. viewers (in points)
1	Mon–Fri 9:30 p.m.	60	1 March 2023	5.1	30 May 2023	6.5	5.1

=== Awards and nominations ===
Year	Award	Category	Nominated	Result	Ref
2023	Produ Awards	Best Music Theme - Superseries or Telenovela	"Qué Facil" by Ventino	Nominated	
2023	Produ Awards	Best Lead Actress - Superseries or Telenovela	Carolina Gómez	Nominated	
2023	Produ Awards	Best Child / Young Lead Actress	Natalia Afanador	Nominated	
2023	Produ Awards	Best Newcomer Actress - Superseries or Telenovela	Camila Esguerra	Nominated	
2023	Produ Awards	Best Newcomer Actress - Superseries or Telenovela	Olga Lucía Vives	Nominated	
2023	Produ Awards	Best Fiction Producer - Superseries or Telenovela	Manuel Peñaloza	Nominated	

== Music ==
Ventino: El Precio De La Gloria (Banda Sonora Original De La Serie De Televisión)

Soundtrack album by Ventino
- Released: 13 February 2023
- Length: 28:58
- Label: Sony Music Entertainment Colombia

The soundtrack of the series was released on 13 February 2023. All songs on the soundtrack are performed by Ventino.

No.	Title	Length
1.	"Qué Facil"	2:23
2.	"Equivocarse"	3:08
3.	"Explicación (featuring Santiago Deluchi)"	2:54
4.	"Nostalgia"	3:49
5.	"Para Despedirme"	2:45
6.	"Entre Mis Planes"	2:38
7.	"Caramelo"	2:38
8.	"Besos En La Herida"	2:34
9.	"Bueno Para Mi"	2:30
10.	"Cuando Me Acuerdo de Ti"	3:34
Total length:		28:58
