= Miss Perú 1993 =

The Miss Perú 1993 pageant was held on April 1, 1993. The chosen winner represented Peru at the Miss Universe 1993 and at the Miss World 1992. The rest of the finalists would enter in different pageants.

== 1993 Designation ==
Due to the restructuring that carried out the Miss Peru Organization, Déborah D'Souza Peixoto was appointed to represent Peru in the Miss Universe 1993 pageant by Mr. Benjamin Kreimer (president of Miss Peru Org).

On May 1, D'Souza traveled to Mexico City, Mexico to compete in the Miss Universe 1993 pageant which was held on May 21. She reached the 11th position, with 8.937 as Average Preliminary Score.

Mónika Saez Grimm, Miss Peru Asia-Pacific 1992, was appointed to represent Peru in the Miss World 1993 pageant, but was difficult for her to find a sponsor and that she would NO longer be able to fund the trip to South Africa.

== Placements ==
Final Results	Contestant
Miss Peru Universe 1993	Distrito Capital - Déborah D'Souza
Miss World Peru 1993	Callao - Mónika Saez Grimm
