= Michel Brown =

Argentine actor

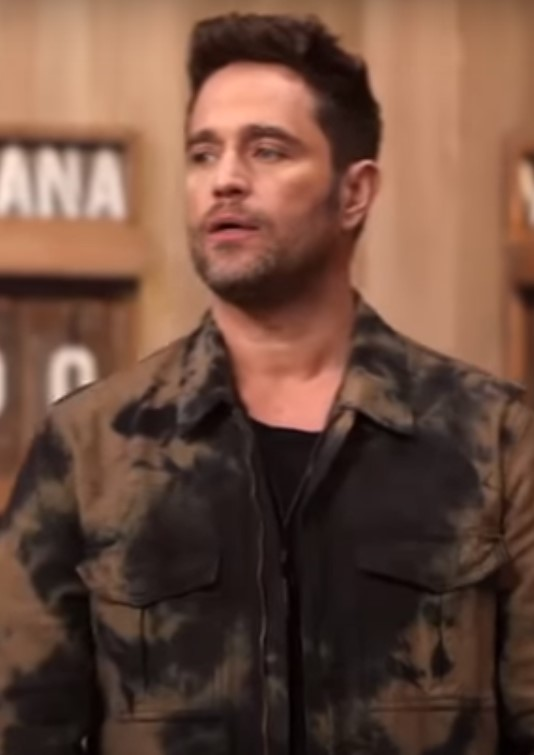
- Brown in 2021
- Born: Misael Browarnik Beiguel; June 10, 1976 (age 49); Buenos Aires, Argentina
- Occupations: Actor; Singer; Television presenter
- Years active: 1993-present
- Height: 1.77 m (5 ft 9 1/2 in)
- Spouse: Margarita Muñoz
- Parent(s): Carlos Browarnik and Silvia Luisa Beiguel

Misael Browarnik Beiguel (born June 10, 1976) better known as Michel Brown is an Argentine actor, singer and Television presenter.

== Career ==
He was discovered by Argentine producer Cris Morena for her teen variety show Jugate Conmigo. Cris Morena also produced his solo album (titled Michel) and gave him a starring role in popular kids soap Chiquititas.

In 1999, Michel decided to invest in his international career and traveled to Mexico, where he got a role in the teen telenovela DKDA Sueños de Juventud for Televisa and soon signed a contract with No. 2 network TV Azteca. The same year he also starred in the video for the track "Out of Control" by the UK big beat act The Chemical Brothers.

He became one of Latin-America and Spain's most popular performers after starring as Franco Reyes in the popular telenovela Pasión de Gavilanes, which became the top-rated soap opera in several countries, including his native Argentina and Spain, where he became a huge star.

He is the host of the Univision network version of Survivor, titled Desafío: La Gran Batalla, which premiered June 20, 2010.

== Filmography ==
=== Film ===
Year	Movie	Character	Notes
2006	Over the Hedge	RJ	Voice (Castilian Spanish version)
2008	Hora cero	Valentín	
2009	Pagafantas	Sebastián	
2009	Condones.com	Toño	
2011	Contra tiempo	Diego Vega Martín	
2014	Cásese quien pueda	Erick	
2016	Rumbos paralelos	Armando	
2016	Malcriados	Alejandro "Álex" Balmaceda	

=== Television programs ===
Year	Program	Notes
1993-1994	Jugate conmigo	Host
1994-1996	Un sol para los chicos	Guest
1995	Jugate conmigo	Guest
2005	Gala de fin de Año	Host
2005	Gala de los más animales	Host
2005	La gala de los Tres	Host
2006	Estoy por ti	Host
2010	Desafío: La Gran Batalla	Host
2013	Gracias por venir, gracias por estar	Guest
2018	#Vive Ro: noche de sueños	Guest

=== Television ===
Year	Title	Character	Notes
1996-97	Chiquititas	Tomás "Tommy" Linares Pintos	371 episodes
1998	Las chicas de enfrente	Facundo Arias	
2000	DKDA, Sueños de juventud	David	2 episodes
2001	Lo que es el amor	Christian Ocampo	68 episodes
2002	Súbete a mi moto	Ricardo Narváez Soler	148 episodes
2003	Enamórate	Mariano Sánchez	
2003-present	Pasión de Gavilanes	Franco Reyes Guerrero	
2004	Los Roldán		Guest
2004-05	Te voy a enseñar a querer	Pablo Méndez Gallardo	127 episodes
2005	El auténtico Rodrigo Leal		Guest
2005	Aquí no hay quien viva		Season 4 Episode 4: "Érase una sequía"
2006-07	Amores de mercado	Diego "Rayo" Valdez	123 episodes
2006-07	Decisiones	Michel	Episode: "Profeta en tierras lejanas"
2006-07	Decisiones	Sebastián	Episode: "La mil amigos"
2007-08	Madre Luna	Ángel Cisneros Portillo	141 episodes
2008	Física o Química	Miguel Belaza	14 episodes
2008-09	El fantasma del Gran Hotel	Miguel Toro	176 episodes
2010	Mentes en shock	Dr. Diego Terra	13 episodes
2011	Correo de inocentes	Gerardo Mora	Guest
2012	La Mariposa	Manuel "Amaury" Martínez	60 episodes
2012	A corazón abierto	Tomás Ballesteros	104 episodes
2012-13	Los Rey	Matías Rey San Vicente	125 episodes
2013-14	Mentiras perfectas	Dr. Santiago Ucrós	58 episodes
2014-15	Amor sin reserva	Diego Olivaterra Mendoza	136 episodes
2016-17	La querida del Centauro	Gerardo Duarte	141 episodes
2016-18	Sr. Ávila	Daniel Molina	3 episodes
2018	Falco	Detective Alejandro Falco	14 episodes
2018-19	Amar a muerte	Macario "El Chino" Valdés / León Gustavo Carvajal Torres / Jacobo Reyes	87 episodes
2019	Hernán	Pedro de Alvarado	10 episodes
2021	Parot	Roberto Plaza	
2021	Cecilia	Germán	1 episode
2022–2023	Pálpito	Simón Duque	24 episodes

=== Theater ===
Year	Title	Character	Director
1994	Jugate conmigo	Himself	Cris Morena
1996-1997	Chiquititas	Tomás "Tommy" Linares Pintos	Cris Morena
2019	Perfectos desconocidos	Hernán	Jaime Metarredona

== Awards and nominations ==
Year	Ceremony	Category	Telenovela	Result
2019 TVyNovelas Awards		Best Actor	Amar a muerte (Love to Death)	Won
2019	Eres Awards	Best Actor	Amar a muerte (Love to Death)	Nomination
2019	Eres Awards	Best Kiss	Amar a muerte (Love to Death) Angelique Boyer and Michel Brown	Nomination
2016 Your World Awards		Favorite Lead Actor: Series	La querida del Centauro	Nomination
2016 Your World Awards		The Perfect Couple	La querida del Centauro Ludwika Paleta and Michel Brown	Nomination
2017 Your World Awards		Favorite Lead Actor: Series	La querida del Centauro	Nomination
2014	Premios Tvynovelas (Colombia)	Favorite Lead Actor: Series	Mentiras perfectas	Nomination
2012	TV Adicto Golden Awards	Mejor retorno masculino	Los Rey	Nomination
