= Jim Button and Luke the Engine Driver (film) =

- Theatrical release poster
- Directed by: Dennis Gansel
- Screenplay by: Andrew Birkin; Dirk Ahner; Sebastian Niemann
- Based on: Jim Button and Luke the Engine Driver by Michael Ende
- Produced by: Christian Becker
- Starring: Henning Baum; Solomon Gordon; Annette Frier; Milan Peschel; Uwe Ochsenknecht; Christoph Maria Herbst
- Cinematography: Torsten Breuer
- Edited by: Ueli Christen
- Music by: Ralf Wengenmayr
- Production companies: Rat Pack Filmproduktion; Malao Film; Warner Bros. Film Productions Germany
- Distributed by: Warner Bros. Pictures
- Release date: 29 March 2018
- Running time: 110 minutes
- Country: Germany
- Language: German
- Box office: $12.7 million

Jim Button and Luke the Engine Driver (German: Jim Knopf und Lukas der Lokomotivführer) is a 2018 German fantasy adventure film directed by Dennis Gansel and produced by Christian Becker. It is an adaptation of the 1960 children's book by Michael Ende. It stars Solomon Gordon as Jim Button and Henning Baum as Luke the Engine Driver.

The film was released in Germany on 29 March 2018 by Warner Bros. Pictures. It received mixed reviews from critics and grossed over $12.7 million at the box office. A sequel based on the second book, Jim Button and the Wild 13, was released in 2020.

== Cast ==
- Solomon Gordon as Jim Button (voiced by Finn Posthumus)
- Henning Baum as Luke the Engine Driver
- Annette Frier as Mrs. Whaat
- Milan Peschel as Mr. Tur Tur
- Uwe Ochsenknecht as King Alfred the Quarter-to-Twelfth
- Christoph Maria Herbst as Mr. Sleeve
- Leighanne Esperanzate as Princess Li Si (voiced by Hedda Erlebach)
- Kao Chenmin as Emperor of Mandala (voiced by Fred Maire)
- Judy Winter as Mrs. Grindtooth (voice)
- Michael "Bully" Herbig as Nepomuk (voice)
- Eden Gough as Ping Pong (voiced by Franz Hagn)
- Ozzie Yue as Pa Po
- Reiner Schöne as Grimbart (voice)
- Rick Kavanian as The Wild 13
- Thomas Fritsch as Narrator (voice)
