= Karabudjan =

Television series

- Genre: Thriller
- Written by: Carlos de Pando; Jon Sagalá; Jacobo Bergareche
- Directed by: Koldo Serra; Felipe Martínez Amador
- Starring: Hugo Silva; Marta Nieto; Carolina Gómez
- Countries of origin: Spain; Colombia
- Original language: Spanish
- No. of seasons: 1
- No. of episodes: 6

Production
- Running time: 70 min (approx.)
- Production companies: Notro TV; Dynamo Producciones

Original release
- Network: Antena 3
- Release: 6 April – 4 May 2010

Karabudjan is a Spanish–Colombian thriller television series starring Hugo Silva and Marta Nieto. Produced by Dynamo Producciones and Notro TV, it originally aired in 2010 on Antena 3.

== Premise ==
Mostly set in between Colombia and Madrid, the fiction follows Diego Salgado, a successful business executive with a dark secret from his past hidden under the guise of his successful persona. His troubled past comes to haunt him after the best friend (María Ugarte) of his sister disappears.

== Cast ==
- Hugo Silva as Diego Salgado.
- Marta Nieto as Ana Muro, Chief Police Officer charged with the investigation on María's whereabouts.
- Carolina Gómez as Paula, television presenter.
- Víctor Clavijo as Dani, Diego's best friend.
- Héctor Colomé as Enrique, Diego's father.
- Lucía Guerrero es María Ugarte.
- Marta Guerras as Elena, Diego's sister.
- Pere Brasó as Adrián, Ana's working colleague.
- Nazaret Aracil as Silvia, María and Elena's friend.

== Production and release ==
A joint Spanish–Colombian co-production, Karabudjan was produced by Notro TV and Dynamo Producciones. Written by Carlos de Pando, Jon Sagalá and Jacobo Bergareche, four episodes were directed by Koldo Serra and two by Felipe Martínez Amador. It was shot on natural locations in Colombia (the bulk of the production, including footage for the Senegalese and Spanish fictional settings) and Spain. The series consists of 6 episodes featuring a running time of around 70 minutes.

The first episode premiered on Antena 3 on 6 April 2010, earning 2,592,000 viewers and a 14.2% audience share. Following a drop in the viewership figures and pending the airing of the two last episodes, Antena 3 decided to program the broadcasting of the remaining two episodes on a back-to-back basis for 4 May 2010, which earned a combined average of 1,636,000 viewers and a 11.1% share.

Series	Episodes	Originally released	
Series	Episodes	First released	Last released
1	6	6 April 2010	4 May 2010

No. in season	Title	Original release date
1	"Desaparición"	6 April 2010
2	"En punto muerto"	13 April 2010
3	"Rumbo a Colombia"	20 April 2010
4	"Secuestro"	27 April 2010
5	"El final. Parte I"	4 May 2010
6	"El final. Parte II"	4 May 2010
