= The Chosen One (2010 film) =

- Theatrical release poster
- Directed by: Rob Schneider
- Written by: Boon Collins; Rob Schneider
- Produced by: Joe Q. Bretz; Boon Collins; Scott Dolezal; Chris Luu; John Schneider; Rob Schneider
- Starring: Rob Schneider; Steve Buscemi; Holland Taylor; Peter Riegert
- Cinematography: Kees Van Oostrum
- Edited by: Greg Babor; Richard Halsey
- Music by: Jeff Rona
- Distributed by: Xenon Pictures
- Release date: September 3, 2010
- Running time: 101 minutes
- Country: United States
- Language: English

The Chosen One is a 2010 American comedy-drama film directed by and starring Rob Schneider as a car salesman facing a midlife crisis with the aid of native Colombian shamans. It also stars Steve Buscemi, Holland Taylor, and Peter Riegert.

== Plot ==
A depressed car salesman (Rob Schneider) is repeatedly interrupted in the act of suicide, by a coworker from the Nissan dealership, a beautiful woman translator (Carolina Gómez), three native American shamans of the Arhuaco people from the mountains of Colombia, and a phone call from his mother (Holland Taylor). He finally finds faith in himself after the rest of world puts its faith in him. The sole being on earth who can save mankind from its own destruction with trust - The Chosen One.

== Cast ==
- Rob Schneider as Paul
- Steve Buscemi as Neal
- Holland Taylor as Ruth
- Peter Riegert as Bob
- Samantha Smith as Christine
- George Dzundza as Norman
- Jack McGee as Produce Manager
- Michael Yama as Mr. Nakamuri
- Carolina Gómez as Marissa
- Pamela Guest as Bird Lady
- Antonio Miguel Calvo as The Mama Arhuaco
- Alberto Villafana as Arhuaco Jim
- Yesid Villafana as Funny Arhuaco
- Ian Fisher as Cabbie

== Production ==
Release of the film was delayed for three years; this may have been due to uncertainty over how to market the film, as this movie which is primarily dramatic was inaccurately marketed as a straightforward comedy. The movie was eventually completed and released direct to video by Chosen One Productions RS LLC.

== Reception ==
=== Critical response ===
Film Critics United, a pseudo-anonymous on-line movie review website, wrote that Schneider gave a good performance, but the film failed due to other factors including its muddled plot. Brian Orndorf described it as an attempt at a more serious dramatic role, but was critical, finding the film a failure. Qwipster found the narrative "lazy" and the plot too bizarre to take seriously, scoring it 2/5 while praising Schneider's restrained performance. DVD Verdict gave it a middling rating.

=== Lawsuits ===
There was a lawsuit from Schneider's collaborator Bob Rubin in 2008 over a fee he felt he was due for helping to arrange financing for the film.

In 2012, Schneider, his brother John Schneider, and the film's production companies (Chosen One Productions RS LLC, Chosen One TWF LLC, and The Chosen One RS LLC) were sued by financial backers to recover a $1.5 million investment. The plaintiffs alleged that the defendants had breached contracts with the plaintiffs and fraudulently induced the plaintiffs into investing in membership interests in one of the film's production companies. George and Nancy Gamble, a married couple, say that in 2008 they were persuaded to invest $1.5 million to complete postproduction work on "The Chosen One," and claim they were never repaid. According to Schneider, "The claims are flatly contradicted by the language of the contracts. The [plaintiffs] made an investment in the movie, with no guarantee of success."

On March 6, 2013, their lawsuit against Rob Schneider was moved from San Francisco to L.A. Superior Court. Legal counsel for Rob Schneider said in a statement: "The Gambles’ lawsuit is frivolous. The Gambles made an investment in the film, with no guarantee of success."
