= Joe Q. Bretz =

American actor, writer, and businessman

- Joseph Quinn Bretz
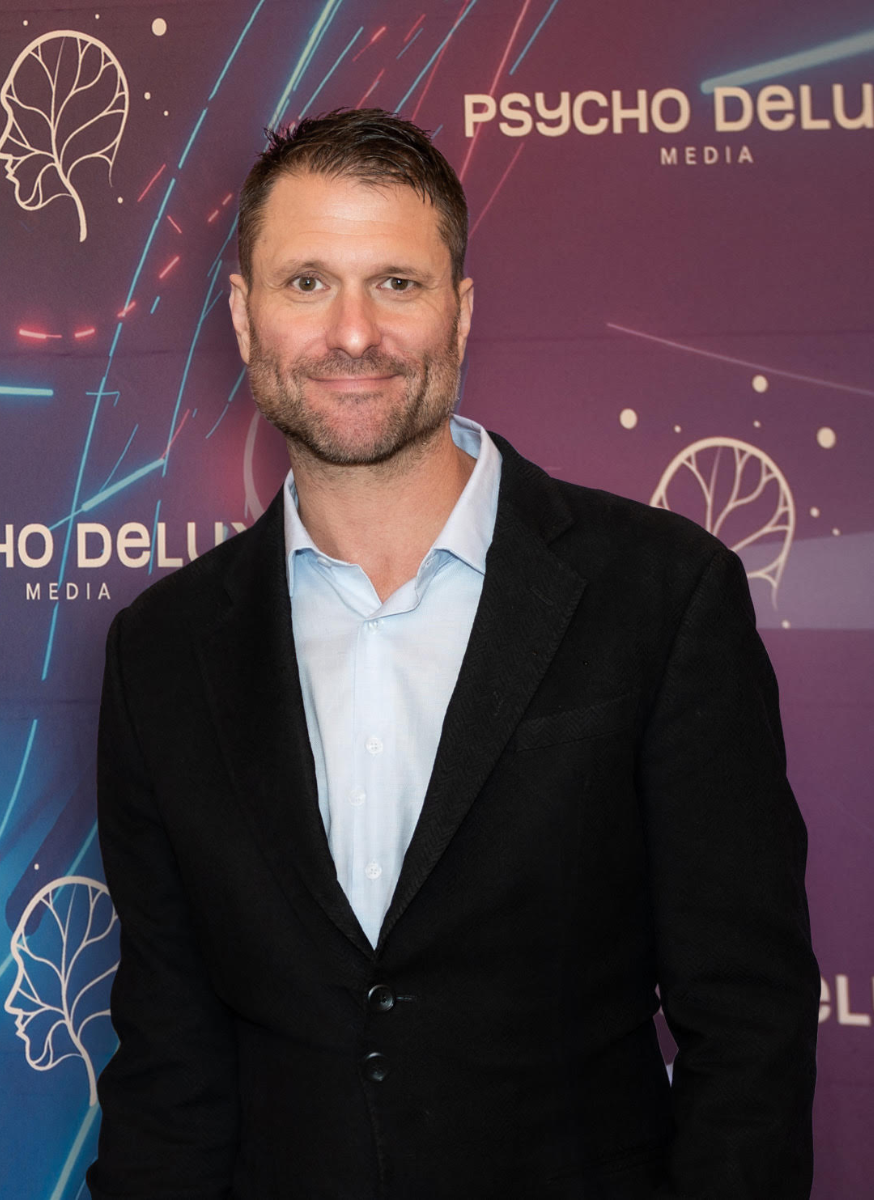
- Joe Q. Bretz in 2024
- Born: Joseph Quinn Bretz; September 24, 1974 (age 51); Milwaukee, Wisconsin, United States
- Occupations: Film and television producer, entrepreneur, actor
- Years active: 1994-actuality
- Organization: PsychoDeLuX Media
- Website: https://psychodelux.media/

Joe Q. Bretz (born Joseph Quinn Bretz, September 24, 1974, in Milwaukee, Wisconsin, United States) is an American actor, writer, businessman, and producer of music and film. He is a member of The Recording Academy, the organization responsible for the Grammy Awards. He participated in the film The Chosen One as both producer and actor. He is also known for producing the first direct-to-hard drive digital production of a televised music awards show, the 2002 California Music Awards.

In addition, Bretz was among the early developers of over-the-top (OTT) media streaming platforms—a system that enables new services, such as streaming, to operate over existing internet infrastructure on devices like DVD players, game consoles, and mobile devices.

He is the CEO and co-founder of PsychoDeLuX Media, a company based in Mallorca, Spain, dedicated to film and television production, as well as multimedia and experimental markets such as augmented reality (AR) and virtual reality (VR).

== Personal life ==
Joseph Quinn Bretz was born on September 24, 1974, in Milwaukee, Wisconsin, United States. He is the son of a former Milwaukee police officer turned businessman, Randolph Bretz, and Andrea Hope Miller. Between 1992 and 1996, he attended the University of Wisconsin-Milwaukee to study political science. He has been married since May 7, 2021, to model Lisa Charlott Murmann and resides in Mallorca, Spain. On August 17, 2025, he became the father of a boy named Maximus.

== Career ==
At an early age, he began modeling. At the age of 20, he moved to Los Angeles, where he alternated between modeling and acting, until he moved to San Francisco, California, where he focused on technological innovations in the field of entertainment.

From 1999 to 2003, Bretz was co-founder and CEO of Missing Link Media Ventures. In this context, in 2002, he became the producer of The California Music Awards, where he gained notoriety for producing the first 'direct-to-hard-disk' digital production of a live show (until then, shows were produced using analog technology).

From 2002 to 2010, he served as CEO and co-founder of the private equity fund QBlack Media, where he managed a diversified portfolio of private funds from technology startups, real estate, and nightclub operations, including Paradise Lounge in San Francisco, California. His company achieved notoriety when he attempted to buy Image Entertainment by offering $100 million for the transaction. In the end, the transaction failed due to the economic crisis of 2007–2008.

In 2010, he participated as executive producer in the film The Chosen One. In this film, he also participated as an actor.

In 2012, he co-founded The Digital Development Group (DIDG) together with the former Image Entertainment president, Martin W. Greenwald. DIDG is a virtual "television network" that delivers content to Internet-enabled display devices. At DIDG, Bretz served as president and director for two years. He was among the first people to adapt and develop OTT streaming platforms. Among the partners in this business entrepreneurship, actor Charlie Sheen stood out.

In 2022, Bretz founded a multimedia production company called PsychoDeLuX Media in Mallorca, Spain, alongside technology entrepreneur Brent G. Whitney, film producer John Schneider, and former MGM TV president John Bryan.

He is also the president of 4kNet.TV, a United States-based company engaged in the production and distribution of ultra-high-definition (4K/UHD) audiovisual content. The company's projects include the 4K coverage of the Great Pacific Race, an ocean rowing event between California and Hawaii, as well as other productions related to sports and documentary content. He is also involved in media development and digital strategy across several entertainment ventures.

== Filmography ==
- Reverb (Serie de TV) (productor – 1 episodio) 2001
- Music Choice OnStage Featuring SmashMouth (Especial de TV) (productor) 2001
- Rob Schneider: Registered Offender (Video) (productor ejecutivo) 2001
- California Music Awards (Especial de TV) (productor ejecutivo) 2002
- Gumby's 50th Birthday party featuring SmashMouth (TV Special) (productor ejecutivo) 2007
- The Chosen One (productor) 2010
- Drain Baby (productor) 2011
- Iraq Love (especial de TV) (productor ejecutivo) 2011
- Yelow (actor) 2012
- Katos Korner (Serie de TV) (productor ejecutivo – 6 episodios) 2013
