= Paula Andrea Betancur =

Colombian former beauty queen and model

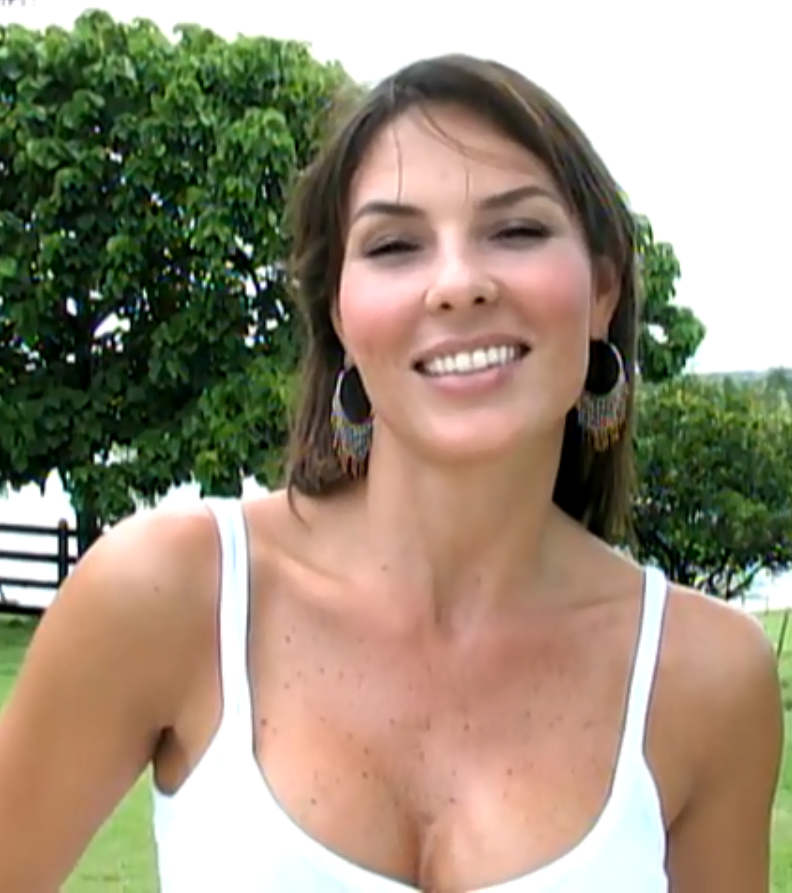
- Born: Paula Andrea Betancur Arroyave; June 1, 1972 (age 54); Medellín, Antioquia, Colombia
- Height: 1.80 m (5 ft 11 in)
- Spouses: Armando Di Pompeo (m. 1993; div. 1994) Juan Carlos Villegas (m. 1995; div. 2008) Luis Miguel Zabaleta (m. 2018)
- Children: 4
- Beauty pageant titleholder
- Title: Miss Amazonas 1992; Miss Colombia 1992
- Years active: 1992–present
- Hair color: Dark brown
- Eye color: Dark brown
- Major competitions: Miss Colombia 1992 (Winner); Miss Universe 1993 (1st Runner-Up)

Paula Andrea Betancur Arroyave (born June 1, 1972) is a Colombian model and beauty pageant titleholder. Betancur represented the department of Amazonas in the 1992 National Beauty Contest and was crowned Miss Colombia 1992.

== Pageantry ==
=== Miss Universe 1993 ===
Betancur represented Colombia in Miss Universe 1993 held in Mexico. From the beginning of the competition, she was a favorite for the crown. During the live broadcast of the pageant, it was revealed that she earned the highest preliminary interview score of all contestants (9.70). She made it to the top 10, earning the highest score in the evening gown competition. Despite her high scores and loud support from the audience, she ended up as first runner-up (second place). Paula Andrea is one of three Miss Colombia title holders to become Miss Universe's first runner-up, for three consecutive years. The previous year, Paola Turbay got second place in the Miss Universe 1992 competition, and the following year, Carolina Gómez was first runner up in the Miss Universe 1994 pageant.

== Career ==
After her reign, she devoted herself to the catwalk as a model of big brands like Gianni Versace. She was on the cover of the Italian magazine Gioia. She participated in the 20-04 Challenge, which she was the winner and in 2015, returned to participate again in the reality Challenge 2015, this time in the country of India. She debuted as an actress in the comedy Two Much by Spanish director Fernando Trueba, whose protagonists were Antonio Banderas and Melanie Griffith. She became part of modeling Colombian companies as Klass Models and signed with L'Agence in the United States.

Paula Andrea ventured into the life of an entrepreneur by setting up a restaurant for salads and fast foods. She then transitioned toward launching her line of bathing gowns. In addition, she has a line of beauty composed of moisturizing oils for the skin (Paula Andrea Secrets).

Her most recent work as a model was for the magazine Donjuán. It was in the group of hopefuls to star in the telenovela Summer in Venice the RCN channel, but another actress was finally chosen.

Awards and achievements
Preceded by (Colombia) Paola Turbay	Miss Universe 1st Runner-Up; 1993	Succeeded by (Colombia) Carolina Gómez
Preceded by Paola Turbay	Miss Colombia; 1992	Succeeded by Carolina Gómez
