= Greetings to the Devil =

2011 film

- Film poster
- Directed by: Juan Felipe Orozco
- Written by: Carlos Esteban Orozco
- Produced by: Juan Felipe Orozco
- Starring: Édgar Ramírez
- Cinematography: Luis Otero
- Release date: 12 August 2011
- Running time: 90 minutes
- Country: Colombia
- Language: Spanish

Greetings to the Devil (Spanish: Saluda al diablo de mi parte) is a 2011 Colombian crime film directed by Juan Felipe Orozco. It was released in France as F.A.R.C. - L'instrument de la vengeance.

The plot concerns Angel, an amnestied FARC guerrilla whose daughter is kidnapped by one of his own former victims. The kidnapper's ultimatum is that Angel has 72 hours to eliminate his former guerrilla unit in order to save his daughter.

== Cast ==
- Édgar Ramírez as Ángel Sotavento
- Ricardo Vélez as Leder
- Carolina Gómez as Helena
- Salvador del Solar as Moris
- Patrick Delmas as Serge
