= Falco (TV series) =

- Based on: Der letzte Bulle by Robert Dannenberg and Stefan Scheich
- Directed by: Ernesto Contreras
- Starring: Michel Brown
- Country of origin: United States
- Original language: Spanish
- No. of seasons: 1
- No. of episodes: 14

Production
- Executive producers: Diego Ramirez Schrempp & Zasha Robles
- Producer: Dynamo
- Camera setup: Multi-camera
- Production companies: Dynamo; Spiral International

Original release
- Network: Amazon Video; Telemundo
- Release: 15 July 2018

Falco is an American television series produced by Dynamo and Spiral International. It is an adaptation of German series Der letzte Bulle. Michel Brown stars as the titular character.

The series is composed of 15 episodes and released on 15 July 2018 on the Amazon Video platform, and on 22 July 2018 it premiered on Telemundo.

== Plot ==
In the middle of a police procedure, Alejandro Falco is shot in the head and left in a coma. He wakes up 23 years later to discover that his wife married another man and his daughter is now a woman. The world around Falco has changed. He has no idea how the internet works, he has never had a mobile phone and the rock n 'roll of his days has become "classic". He manages to recover his old job and faces police cases using his "old techniques". Falco has not lost his detective techniques or his irreverence and will have to learn to work with his new partner, to accept his daughter's boyfriend and even work with his former wife’s new husband, who, to Falco’s misfortune, will prove to be a great professional ally. Both Falco and his team will have difficulty adapting to each other as he tries to perform his job while trying to figure out what happened that night, 23 years ago.

== Cast ==
- Michel Brown as Alejandro Falco
- Hoze Meléndez as Tenoch Caballero
- Marina de Tavira as Carolina
- Enrique Arreola as Juan Pablo Bravo
- Karina Gidi as Eva Salomón
- Danae Reynaud as Paula
- Mauricio García as Felipe Mares
- Manuel Poncelis as Elias Falco
- Juan Carlos Colombo
- Fátima Molina as Sonia

== Television ratings ==
Viewership and ratings per season of Falco
Season	Timeslot (ET)	Episodes	First aired		Last aired		Avg. viewers (millions)	18–49 rank
Season	Timeslot (ET)	Episodes	Date	Viewers (millions)	Date	Viewers (millions)	Avg. viewers (millions)	18–49 rank
1	Sunday 9pm/8c Saturday 9pm/8c	14	22 July 2018	0.83	29 September 2018	0.46	0.60	TBD

== Episodes ==
No.	Title	Original release date	US air date	Prod. code	US viewers (millions)
1	"Despertar" "Falco despierta del coma (Note: Titles of its broadcast by Telemundo.)"	15 July 2018	22 July 2018	101	0.83
Alejandro Falco is a shrewd judicial police in Mexico City. He has a happy marriage and a two-year-old daughter. His stubbornness to investigate the murky investigation of a politician's murder costs him a shot in the head and 23 years in a coma. When he opens his eyes, everything has changed.
2	"Memorabilia" "Falco empieza su nueva vida"	15 July 2018	29 July 2018	102	0.69
Falco goes back to work in the police department. He must investigate the murder of a man who led a double life. Falco discovers that the forensic doctor is his wife's partner. The agent starts his therapy.
3	"Máscaras" "Falco vuelve a ver a su hija"	15 July 2018	5 August 2018	103	0.67
After 23 years, Falco's most desired moment with his daughter, Paula, does not come out as he imagined it. The detective is obsessed with deciphering the mysterious death of a psychiatrist.
4	"Bocanada" "Falco se ilusiona con Carolina"	15 July 2018	12 August 2018	104	0.67
A casual kiss ignites the illusion of Falco to reconquer Carolina. Detectives face a murderer who poisons several women with cyanide. Paula celebrates her birthday.
5	"Lobo feroz" "Falco descifra su rompecabezas"	15 July 2018	19 August 2018	105	0.75
The nightmares torment Falco and impel him to find out about the pieces of the riddle, which do not fit with the day he was shot. A costume party has a bloody ending.
6	"Juegos mentales" "Falco conoce quién le disparó"	15 July 2018	26 August 2018	106	0.66
7	"Efectos secundarios" "Falco atenta contra su vida"	15 July 2018	2 September 2018	107	0.67
Alejandro Falco can not accept the betrayal of his great friend and the lost years of his life. In a moment of despair, he commits a madness and takes a bottle of sleeping pills.
8	"Meninas" "Caballero descubre a Falco"	15 July 2018	9 September 2018	108	0.61
Tenoch discovers that Falco suspects of Bravo and asks for explanations. Alejandro confesses what torments him about his best friend and how involved he is.
9	"Tres muertos" "La corrupción inquieta a Falco"	15 July 2018	15 September 2018	109	0.51
When investigating the murder of a journalist who denounced a network of corruption, Falco ties up and deduces that the crime is related to powerful businessmen and people from their environment.
10	"Fauna – Parte uno" "Falco investiga un secuestro"	15 July 2018	15 September 2018	110	0.50
The detectives are investigating the abduction of a businessman's son, which is in the hands of La Fauna, a supposed activist group that defends the environment and social equity. Bravo follows Falco.
11	"Fauna – Parte dos" "Bravo roba las pruebas a Falco"	15 July 2018	22 September 2018	111	0.46
Juan Pablo gets into Falco's room. He discovers the files against him and takes them. The detectives take a risk and find the young man kidnapped. They destroy the group, Fauna.
12	"Eclipse" "Matan a Juan Pablo"	15 July 2018	22 September 2018	112	0.37
Falco faces his best friend, who confesses that he was forced to shoot him. Zepeda kills Bravo, to silence him. A cabinetmaker is brutally executed.
13	"Isaías" "Falco es sospechoso"	15 July 2018	29 September 2018	113	0.53
Falco must deal with the death of his best friend and prove his innocence, after confirming that his fingerprints were on the weapon that ended his life. A murderer kills in the name of God.
14	"Fuga" "Falco deja todo atrás"	15 July 2018	29 September 2018	114	0.46
With so much corruption around him, Falco decides to abandon his search for justice and disappears, after his partner gives his life for him. They find all the evidence of his attack.

== Awards and nominations ==
Year	Award	Category	Nominated	Result
2019	International Emmy Award	Best Non-English Language U.S. Primetime Program	Falco	Won
