= Shiverstone Castle =

- Poster
- Directed by: Ralf Huettner
- Written by: Christian Limmer; Simon Hauschild
- Produced by: Annie Brunner; Andreas Richter; Alexis Wittgenstein; Ursula Woerner
- Starring: Jana Pallaske; Henning Baum; Sophie Rois; Harald Schmidt
- Cinematography: Armin Dieroff
- Edited by: Kai Schröter
- Music by: Stevie B-Zet; Ralf Hildenbeutel
- Production companies: Roxy Film; Violet Pictures UG; Tele München Gruppe
- Distributed by: Concorde Filmverleih
- Release date: 20 October 2016
- Running time: 96 minutes
- Country: Germany
- Language: German

Shiverstone Castle (German: Burg Schreckenstein) is a 2016 German family film directed by Ralf Huettner. It is loosely based on the 1959-1988 children's book series Burg Schreckenstein by Oliver Hassencamp, updating the setting to modern times.

The film was shot in 2015 in locations such as Taufers Castle, Kraiburg and Tüßling. It was positively received, being granted a "worthwhile" mention by the Deutsche Film- und Medienbewertung (FBW). It was followed in 2017 by a sequel, Burg Schreckenstein 2 – Küssen (nicht) verboten.

== Plot ==
After his last misdeed, rebellious 11 years old Stephan is sent by his busy flight attendant mother to a boarding school, Schreckenstein Castle, directed by her friend Gerhard "Rex" Maier. The castle is no ordinary school, as it is owned by an eccentric aristocrat who descends from a legendary 1780s inventor, count Eduard Alfons von Schreckenstein, who committed suicide after the Montgolfier brothers unveiled their hot air balloon before he could show his own flying machines.

The aloof Stephan struggles to fit in with the rowdy local boys, especially his roommates, a gang known as the Knights, formed by Ottokar, Dampfwalze, Mücke and Strehlau. However, he gets eventually accepted into their group, which gathers in the castle's secret torture chamber, and is subjected to a test in order to prove he is worthy, namely aiding them to pull a practical joke on a rival board school, Rosenfels. The latter, located at the other side of the castle's lake, is a prim and proper female-exclusive school, just as Schreckenstein is a male-exclusive school that favors creativity. The prank is successful, with the boys thrashing Rosenfels' computer room by releasing hens inside, but when Rosenfels's strict headmaster Mrs. Horn comes to complain, Stephan cannot help but confess, which drags the entire gang into punishment.

Their main enemies in Rosenfels are led by Bea, Alina and Mücke's sister Inga, who decide to have revenge on the boys. The girls pretend to make peace with them in order to steal their key of Schreckenstein, albeit unexpectedly having fun all together during the truce, and later infiltrate the school to thrash the boys' clothes. Humiliated by the twist, and being secretly motivated by Rex, the boys pull another prank on Rosenfels, this time sneaking in a drone, piloted by Stephan due to his experience with them, which activates the castle's fire alarm system. The damage caused by the water hydrants, however, reveals that Rosenfels' beams are rotten, which drives Rex and Mrs. Horn to move the girls to Schreckenstein while the building is repaired. Coexistence between both groups becomes difficult due to their different philosophies.

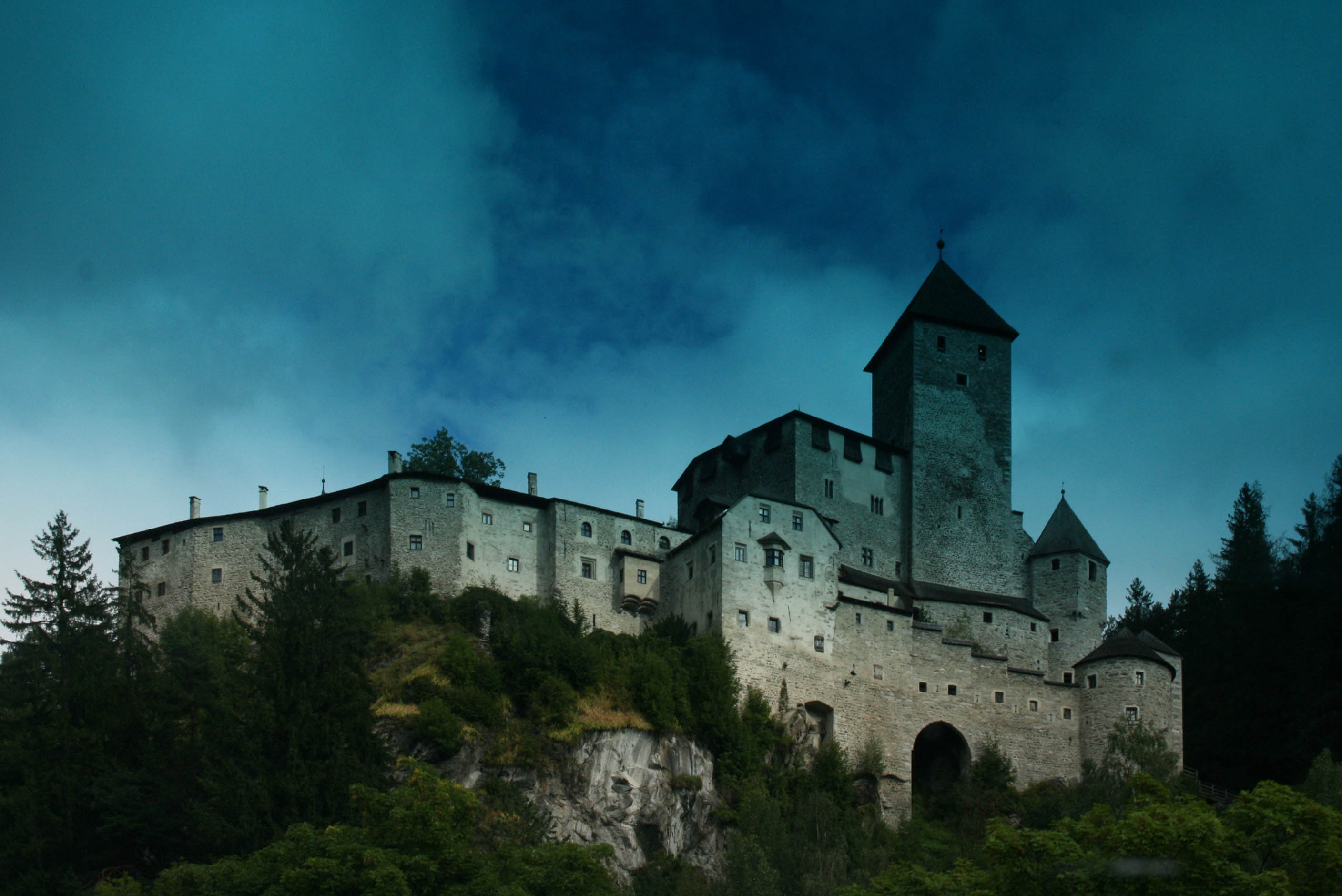
Real life Taufers Castle, which portrays Schreckenstein Castle in the film.

Curious about the castle's secret chamber, but refused to be taken there by the boys, Bea and her gang kidnap Strehlau to blackmail the Knights into allowing them in. At the same time, Stephan learns his mother has changed jobs to have more time for him and will take him from the castle, which crushes him, as he feels he has finally found his place there. He has a much needed break when Strehlau's mediation helps the boys and girls become all friends, after which the two groups throw a secret sleepover party in the girls' bedroom to celebrate the upcoming school festival. However, when Rex and Mrs. Horn accidentally bust the party, she comes to believe her schoolgirls are engaging in inappropriate sexuality and forbids them to involve themselves in the event.

When the festival comes, the kids resort to trap Mrs. Horn in a room so she cannot stop the girls from attending and having fun. The woman accidentally releases the festival's hot air balloon with her in the basket, forcing her to jump into the lake to escape. Angry by the scandal, she has the kids judged and forces Rex to resign from his job the school's headmaster, after which Stephan's mother and stepfather also barge to take him away. However, right after Stephen has said goodbye to them, all the boys and girls in both schools come out with their own luggage, claiming they will leave too if Stephan does. This eventually moves Mrs. Horn to retract her actions and his parents to let him stay, and Stephan and his friends celebrate.

== Cast ==
- Maurizio Magno as Stephan
- Chieloka Nwokolo as Dampfwalze
- Benedict Glöckle as Ottokar
- Caspar Kryzsch as Mücke
- Eloi Christ as Strehlau
- Nina Goceva as Bea
- Mina Rueffer as Inga
- Paula Donath as Alina
- Jana Pallaske as Melanie
- Matthias Lier as Sebastian
- Henning Baum as Gerhard "Rex" Maier
- Sophie Rois as Mrs. Horn
- Harald Schmidt as Count Schreckenstein
- Alexander Beyer as Jean
