= Desafío: La Gran Batalla =

Spanish-language American TV game show

- Also known as: All-Stars Desafío: La Gran Batalla
- Genre: Reality television
- Based on: Desafío
- Presented by: Michel Brown
- Country of origin: United States
- Original language: Spanish
- No. of episodes: 40

Production
- Running time: Hour and a Half per Episode

Original release
- Network: Univision
- Release: May 2 – September 2, 2010

Related
- El Desafio : Mexico; El Desafio : Heroes vs. Villanas

All-Stars Desafío: La Gran Batalla is a Spanish-language American reality television game show produced by Spanish-language network Univision. The series was originally broadcast from May 2, 2010 to September 2, 2010. Hosted by Argentine actor Michel Brown. The show is based on the Colombian reality show Desafío, which itself shares many similarities to the popular American show Survivor. However, the format differs in several ways.

== Format ==
=== Teams ===
The show features 18 contestants, all Latin American United States citizens. They are taken to an island in Panama, where they compete in various challenges until only three remain. These three are voted on by the viewing public to win the grand prize.

The teams are established based on which region of Latin America each player originates from, either directly or indirectly. Each team received a name and a color. The "Jaguares" represent Mexico and Central America and will bear the color green; the "Barracudas" represent the Caribbean and will wear blue; and the "Aguilas" come from South America and will use the color orange.

=== Challenges ===
On each episode, the teams will participate in three challenges or "desafíos":

- Desafío Territorial - The teams compete for the best living conditions, with the winners receiving the "keys" to Playa Alta, a luxurious beach-house, furnished with beds, showers and food. The second place team gets to live in Playa Media, which is comfortable but less extravagant, with a roof and hammocks to sleep, as well as pots, pans and some food for them to cook. The third place team receives the "keys" to Playa Baja, which features the worst conditions to live in. The players must live outdoors or build their own shelter, and they have no food or water given to them.
- Desafío de Salvación - The winning team gains immunity from elimination and the chance to be judges at the final "juicio" or judgment.
- Desafío Final is between the second and third place teams from the previous challenge. The losing team is sent to "El Juicio", where they must vote to have one of their players eliminated.

== Contestants ==
Contestant	Occupation	Originally from	Assigned Team			Eliminated
Jilis Molinares; 30, Miami, FL	Sales Representative	Venezuela	Aguilas			1st Voted Out; Day 13
Gustavo Larrucea; 42, West Palm Beach, FL	Martial Arts Instructor	Uruguay	Aguilas			2nd Voted Out; Day 21
Josephina Valdéz; 26, New York City, NY	Student	United States	Barracudas			Evacuated; Day 28
Yenny Love; 32, New Jersey	Biology Professor	Dominican Republic	Barracudas			3rd Voted Out; Day 35
Susana Garcia; 25, Chicago, IL	Model	Mexico	Jaguares			4th Voted Out; Day 42
Tinno Delgado; 37, New York City, NY	Actor/Writer	Puerto Rico	Barracudas			5th Voted Out; Day 49
Karla Ronquillo; 31, Nashville, TN	Spanish tutor	Costa Rica	Jaguares	Barracudas		6th Voted Out; Day 56
Hernán Bermejo; 32, Miami, FL	Oceanographer	Venezuela	Aguilas			7th Voted Out; Day 63
Diego Gómez; 35, Miami, FL	TV Producer	Colombia	Aguilas			8th Voted Out; Day 70
Jonathan Aguilera; 33, Riverview, FL	Waiter	Costa Rica	Jaguares	Barracudas	Fusión	9th Voted Out; Day 77
Ana María Usategui; 29, Miami, FL	Physical Trainer	United States	Barracudas		Fusión	10th Voted Out; Day 84
Abril Aguirre; 20, Houston, TX	Nurse	Mexico	Jaguares	Barracudas	Fusión	11th Voted Out; Day 91
Angélica Vélez; 35, Miami, FL	Graphic Designer	Colombia	Aguilas		Fusión	12th Voted Out; Day 98
Arturo Espinosa; 36, Miami, FL	Salesman	Cuba	Barracudas		Fusión	13th Voted Out; Day 105
José Hernandez; 22, Atlanta, GA	Actor	Mexico	Jaguares	Aguilas	Fusión	14th Voted Out; Day 112
Alejandra Iglesias; 36, San Juan, PR	Personal Trainer	Argentina	Aguilas		Fusión	3rd Place; Day 120
Oscar Villagómez; 34, Los Angeles, CA	Lifeguard	Mexico	Jaguares	Aguilas	Fusión	2nd Place; Day 120
Yunior Puig; 32, Las Vegas, NV	Driver	Cuba	Barracudas		Fusión	WINNER; Day 120

== Elimination Table ==
Position	Contestant	Team	2nd Team	Final Team	Status	Merge
18	Jilis	Aguilas			1st Voted Off in Day 13	Non Merged
17	Gustavo	Aguilas			2nd Voted Off in Day 21	Non Merged
16	Josephina	Barracudas			Eliminated by Injury in Day 28	Non Merged
15	Yenny	Barracudas			3rd Voted Off in Day 35	Non Merged
14	Susana	Jaguares			4thVoted Off in Day 42	Non Merged
13	Tinno	Barracudas			5th Voted Off in Day 49	Non Merged
12	Karla	Jaguares		Barracudas	6th Voted Off in Day 56	Non Merged
11	Hernan	Aguilas			7th Voted Off in Day 63	Non Merged
10	Diego	Aguilas			8th Voted Off in Day 70	Non Merged
9	Jonathan	Jaguares	Barracudas	Fusión	9th Voted Off in Day 77	Merged
8	Ana Maria	Barracudas		Fusión	10th Voted Off in Day 84	Merged
7	Abril	Jaguares	Barracudas	Fusión	11th Voted Off in Day 91	Merged
6	Angelica	Aguilas		Fusión	12th Voted Off in Day 98	Merged
5	Arturo	Barracudas		Fusión	13th Voted Off in Day 105	Merged
4	Jose	Jaguares	Aguilas	Fusión	14th Voted Off in Day 112	Merged
3	Alejandra	Aguilas		Fusión	3rd Place	Merged
2	Oscar	Jaguares	Aguilas	Fusión	2nd Place	Merged
1	Yunior	Barracudas		Fusión	Winner	Merged

== The Game ==
=== Territorial Challenges ===
Determine living conditions: Playa Alta (best), Media (average), Baja (worst).

Episode	Alta	Media	Baja
June 20, 2010	Aguilas	Barracudas	Jaguares
June 27, 2010	Barracudas	Aguilas	Jaguares
July 4, 2010	Jaguares	Barracudas	Aguilas
July 11, 2010	Jaguares	Barracudas	Aguilas
July 18, 2010	Aguilas	Barracudas	Jaguares
July 26, 2010	Aguilas		Barracudas
August 1, 2010	Aguilas		Barracudas
August 8, 2010	Barracudas		Aguilas

=== Eliminations ===
During each episode, the team that wins the Desafío de Salvación serves as judge at the "Juicio", and the team that loses the Desafío Final has to eliminate a member of the team.

Episode	Judges	Losing Team	Vetoed Vote	Eliminated	Finish
June 20, 2010	Jaguares	Aguilas	Diego	Jilis	1st Voted Out; 4-1
June 27, 2010	Barracudas	Aguilas	None	Gustavo	2nd Voted Out; 4-1
July 4, 2010	Jaguares	Barracudas	None	Yenny	3rd Voted Out; 4-1
July 11, 2010	Aguilas	Jaguares	None	Susana	4th Voted Out; 5-1
July 18, 2010	Aguilas	Barracudas	None	Tinno	5th Voted Out; 2-2
Episode	Judges	Immune Player	Vetoed Vote	Eliminated	Finish
July 25, 2010	Aguilas	Yunior	Jonathan	Karla	6th Voted Out; 3-2
August 1, 2010	Barracudas	José	None	Hernán	7th Voted Out; 3-1-1-1
August 8, 2010	Barracudas	José	Angélica	Diego	8th Voted Out; 4-1

^1 Josephine (from the Barracudas) had to be abandon the show due to a fractured foot.

^2 On the first vote, Tinno and Yunior came out tied, and the Aguilas chose to eliminate Tinno.

== Episodes ==
=== Chapter 1 ===
The three teams competed for the best living conditions. The Eagles won the best beach, while the Jaguars endured tough conditions outside. In the end, however, the underdog Jaguars won Immunity. The Eagles and Barracudas fought in the second half of the challenge and Diego and Jilis held the Eagles back. Later, Diego was accused of not giving his all. At the voting ceremony, Jilis commented that everyone had decided not to plot and to keep their vote personal. The vote ended up 3-1-1-1 against Diego, with Hernán, Angélica and Jilis also receiving votes. Diego pleaded his case to the Jaguars, who spared him by vetoing the decision. Instantly and with no private ballot, the Eagles had to make another decision. The team voted 4-1 against Jilis, citing her lack of athleticism.

=== Chapter 2 ===
At Playa Alta, Diego was emotional upon returning from the voting ceremony, where he was initially voted off by the Eagles then saved by the Jaguars. The Jaguars, expecting not to return to Playa Baja, destroyed their camp so that whichever team returned would not have an easy start. Karla and Jonathan refused to help destroy the camp just in case they lost and did have to return. This alienated them from the team and caused an argument between Karla, José and Abril.

At the Territorial Challenge, Hernán (Eagles) called out Yunior (Barracudas) for not being a good sport. The Barracudas won the Territorial Challenge and the Jaguars, again, came in third, returning to the camp they destroyed prematurely. Karla became emotional upon arriving to the destroyed camp and Abril was annoyed by her tears. At Playa Alta, Tinno and Ana Maria discussed Yenny's weight and thought she should diet in order to keep up with the athleticism of the team.

At the Immunity Challenge, things got heated in a full-contact game. Tinno (Barracudas) and Oscar (Jaguars) got close to fighting, but continued with the game. Gustavo (Eagles) left with serious injuries that plagued him in the final challenge. The Eagles and Jaguars reunited to play the final challenge to determine who would vote out a teammate. Hernán gave up in the very end, allowing José to win the challenge for the Jaguars.

Back at their camps, the Eagles and Jaguars worried that the Barracudas would show no mercy and force an injured Gustavo to remain in the game in order to weaken the Eagles team. Abril (Jaguars) expressed her team's view on the Barracudas, calling them arrogant and "dogs." At the voting ceremony, the Eagles voted 3-1 against Gustavo. Gustavo then pleaded to the Barracudas to let him leave. Alejandra, chosen as the representative for the Eagles, asked the Barracudas to show compassion and let Gustavo go, even causing Tinno to cry. The Barracudas allowed Gustavo to leave and his team said a very emotional goodbye.

=== Chapter 3 ===
The Barracudas began to argue, specifically the men. At the Territorial Challenge, Josephine (Barracudas) was medically evacuated and later removed from the game due to a fractured foot. The competition went on and the Jaguars won the right to stay at Playa Alta for the first time since the game began. The next day, the Jaguars won the Immunity Challenge for the second time. At the final challenge between the Eagles and Barracudas, Yenny got stuck in one of the obstacles and lost her team's lead. However, the men laughed and played around while she struggled to get out of the mud. Finally, the players were told that the time allotted for the game had expired and the Eagles won by default.

At the voting ceremony, Ana Maria expressed that her body was in pain but that she had the will to continue. Yenny, on the other hand, begged the Jaguars to let her leave the game, citing breathing problems and pains in her chest. The Barracudas voted 4-1 against Yenny and the Jaguars agreed to let her leave, despite wanting originally to cripple the strong Barracuda team.

=== Chapter 4 ===
At the Territorial Challenge, Hernán held the Eagles back and their team was plagued by their canoe constantly sinking during the game. The Jaguars won their second Territorial Challenge in a row, maintaining control of Playa Alta. Later that night, the girls tried to get Oscar not to drink too much and he expressed frustration with their scolding him.

The Immunity Challenge was a challenge that required the teams to hurl a giant rubber ball at the opposing teams' clay pots to knock them down. The Jaguars and Eagles teamed up against the Barracudas, perceived as the strongest team physically and most arrogant. They succeeded and the Eagles won. Back at camp, the Barracudas were shocked that the Eagles ganged up on them instead of targeting the Jaguars, who have all six members intact.

The Elimination Challenge was a basketball challenge played in the mud and led to more heated confrontations. Again, Oscar got close to fighting with some of the Barracudas, shoving Yunior at the end of one round. The Barracudas were victorious and the Jaguars lost their first Elimination Challenge.

The Jaguars planned to eliminate either Abril or Susana. They all felt Abril was not living up to what she said she was capable of (having been in the army) and that Susana was not motivated enough. Susana was also concerned about a serious skin allergy covering her entire body. At the judgement ceremony, the Jaguars voted out Susana 5-1 and the Eagles chose not to veto the decision.

=== Chapter 5 ===
The Eagles discussed how their decision not to veto the Jaguars' vote was a chance to possibly forge an alliance with them. At the Barracudas' camp, the romance between Tinno and Ana grew. At the Territorial Challenge, the Jaguars came out to an early lead but eventually the Eagles overcame them to win the challenge. The Barracudas again landed in second place and the Jaguars were sent to Playa Baja.

At Playa Baja, Diego found a dead lizard for the Jaguars to eat. José described growing up in Mexico and sometimes not having food, comparing it to Playa Baja. Oscar and Abril clashed over what Oscar viewed as immaturity on her part. José noticed that others were getting fed up with Abril but he enjoyed her company. The Eagles discussed wanting the Barracudas to get rid of Yunior because of his cocky attitude.

The Eagles won their second Immunity Challenge in a row, but Alejandra brought up Diego's lack of athleticism. At the Barracudas' camp, Arturo mentioned that Ana Maria was slowing them down but that since she was the only woman on the team, the men understood.

The Jaguars won the elimination challenge against the Barracudas. Arturo held Tinno responsible for losing the challenge. Arturo and Yunior felt vulnerable because of Tinno and Ana's alliance. Ana felt that she was being called weak just because of her gender. Shockingly, Ana did not receive a single vote. The votes ended up 2-2 between Tinno and Yunior, whose fates were left up to the jury. The Eagles decided to eliminate the stronger of the two: Tinno.

=== Chapter 6 ===
- Desafío Territorial: Each team had to choose a captain to participate. Each captain will have to stand on a block of nails indefinitely. The team that loses has to disintegrate and have its members split among the remaining two teams. The remaining two teams will split "Playa Alta" and "Playa Baja". The competing captains were Hernán (Aguilas), Arturo (Barracudas), and José (Jaguares).
  - Winner: Aguilas
- Desafío de Salvación: One contestant will be hanging by a rope, instructing his/her blindfolded teammates to walk around a course gathering bags. Each bag contained the pieces of a puzzle with the word "Desafío". After gathering all the pieces, the contestant that was hanging had to build the puzzle and mount it on a board.
  - Winner: Aguilas
- Desafío Final: The contestants would have to build a puzzle assigned by the host, using several figures. Then they had to run through an obstacle course without dropping the figures. For each completed course, the contestant wins a point. The first contestant to win 7 points, wins.
  - Winner: Yunior
  - Eliminated: Karla
- First aired: July 26, 2010

=== Chapter 7 ===
- Desafío Territorial: The contestants had to complete an obstacle course in the water while being handcuffed in pairs. The last sole contestant would have to carry the team flag through the course and put it in a pole when reaching the end.
  - Winner: Aguilas
- Desafío de Salvación: The contestants had to compete one-on-one in several challenges of strength, balance, and resistance. Each team wins one point for every one of their contestants that wins their individual challenge.
  - Winner: Barracudas
- Desafío Final: The contestants had to complete an obstacle course with a basket strapped to their backs. At the end of the course, they had to use a catapult to put two bean bags on the basket. They then had to return through the same obstacle course, putting the two bean bags in a box. The contestant that brings back 10 bags wins.
  - Winner: José
  - Eliminated: Hernán
- First aired: August 1, 2010

=== Chapter 8 ===
- Desafío Territorial: The contestants had to swim through an obstacle course while gathering bags with colored blocks. After collecting all the bags, two contestants had to organize the blocks along a narrow wooden beam in the water and topple them like dominoes.
  - Winner: Barracudas
- Desafío de Salvación: The contestants had to compete one-on-one in several boxing matches along a wooden pole.
  - Winner: Barracudas
- Desafío Final: The contestants had to complete an obstacle course and touch a horn at the end, then returning to the starting line along the same way.
  - Winner: José
  - Eliminated: Diego
- First aired: August 8, 2010

=== Chapter 9 ===
- Desafío de Salvación #1: The contestants must complete an obstacle course divided in eight sections. After each section is completed, the last contestant is eliminated, until only two remain in the end.
  - Winner: Yunior
- Desafío de Salvación #2: The contestants must run back and forth through a course during a specified amount of time. If a contestant doesn't make it back to the starting line within said time, he/she is eliminated. The last contestant wins.
  - Winner: Alejandra
- Desafío a Muerte: The contestants must climb a tower and read a scroll with coordinates. Then, they must go back down, walk through a wooden beam and tie a pair of ropes across a giant compass according to the coordinates they read. They then must dig on the place the ropes cross, find a flag, and climb back the tower to read the next coordinates. The contestant to find five flags wins.
  - Winner: Oscar
  - Eliminated: Jonathan
- First aired: August 15, 2010

=== Chapter 10 ===
- Desafío de Salvación #1: The contestants will have to walk through an obstacle course with their hands and feet bound by chains. At the end of the course, they will have to untie a knot and turn a pulley to raise a weight. Then they have to return to the starting line.
  - Winner: Yunior
- Desafío de Salvación #2: The contestants will have to stand on a box with 5 beams keeping their balance. As time progresses, beams will be removed one by one, ultimately leaving the contestants standing in just one beam. The contestant that holds his/her balance for the longest time wins
  - Winner: José
- Desafío a Muerte: The contestants will have a rope tied to their waist. They will have to follow the rope through an obstacle course in the water, unraveling as they progress. In the end, they have to swim to a horn in the water, which they will be able to reach if they unraveled the rope completely. The first contestant to touch the horn wins.
  - Winner: Abril
  - Eliminated: Ana María
- First aired: August 23, 2010

=== Chapter 11 ===
- Desafío de Salvación #1: The contestants will take turns to use a catapult on a platform inside the ocean, to launch a football to the other contestants in the water. The one who catches the ball has to dunk it in the basket with the name of the contestant they want to eliminate. When contestants accumulate 5 points against them, they are eliminated from the game. Whoever remains in the end, wins.
  - Winner: Angélica
- Desafío de Salvación #2: The contestants will walk through an obstacle course blindfolded. In the other end, they will take pieces of a puzzle from a box, and walk back again through the obstacle course to put the pieces on a table with their name. Whoever brings six pieces and puts them in its place, wins.
  - Winner: Alejandra
- Desafío a Muerte: The contestants will walk through an obstacle course until they reach a wooden beam standing several feet above ground. With a rope with a grappling hook in the end, they'll have to grab a chest and take it to the starting point. They will have to repeat the process for three chests, with the beam they'll be standing on, higher each time. When they have brought the three chests, they'll have to open them and build a puzzle. Whoever finishes it first, wins.
  - Winner: Arturo
  - Eliminated: Abril
- First aired: August 29, 2010

== Votes ==
=== Elimination Votes ===
	Original Teams					Merged Teams		
Episode #:	1	2	3	4	5	6	7	8
Eliminated:	Jilis; 4/1 votes	Gustavo; 4/1 votes	Yenny; 4/1 votes	Susana; 5/1 votes	Tinno; 2/2 votes	Karla; 4/2 votes	Hernán; 3/1/1/1 votes	Diego; 4/1 votes
Voter	Vote							
Abril				Susana		Karla		
Alejandra	Jilis	Gustavo					Angélica	Diego
Ana			Yenny		Yunior	Karla		
Angélica	Jilis	Gustavo					Oscar	Diego
Arturo			Yenny		Tinno	Karla		
Diego		Gustavo					Hernán	Alejandra
Jonathan				Susana		Abril		
José				Susana			Hernán	Diego
Oscar				Susana			Hernán	Diego
Yunior			Yenny		Tinno	Karla		
Hernán	Jilis	Gustavo					Diego	
Karla				Susana		Abril		
Tinno			Yenny		Yunior			
Susana				Abril				
Yenny			Arturo					
Gustavo	Jilis	Angélica						
Jilis	Angélica							

=== Vetoed Decisions ===
Episode 01: The Aguilas originally voted 3-1-1-1 against Diego, with Diego voting for Hernán, Jilis for Angélica, and Angélica for Jilis.
Episode 02: None
Episode 03: None
Episode 04: None
Episode 05: Since the Barracudas' vote ended up a tie, the Aguilas served as the tiebreakers.
Episode 06: The Barracudas originally voted 5-1 against Jonathan, with Jonathan voting for Abril.
Episode 07: None
Episode 08: The Aguilas originally voted 4-1 against Angélica, with Angélica voting for Oscar.
