= Miss Colombia 1993 =

1993 beauty pageant

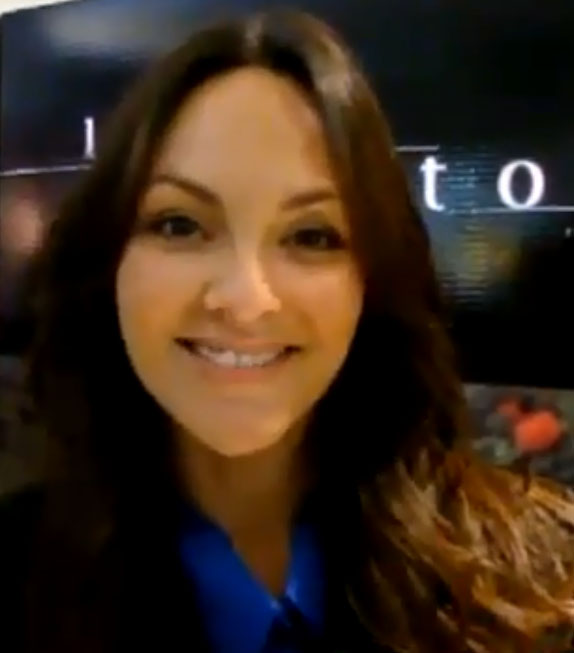
- Date: November 11, 1993
- Presenters: Pilar Castaño; Fernando González Pacheco
- Venue: Centro de Convenciones Julio Cesar Turbay, Cartagena de Indias, Colombia
- Entrants: 29
- Winner: Carolina Gómez; Bogotá
- Congeniality: Rosmaira Hernandez; Cesar
- Best National Costume: Diana Isabel Romero; Valle

Miss Colombia 1993, the 59th Miss Colombia pageant, was held in the Centro de Convenciones Cartagena de Indias, located in Cartagena de Indias, Bolívar Department, Colombia.

== Results ==
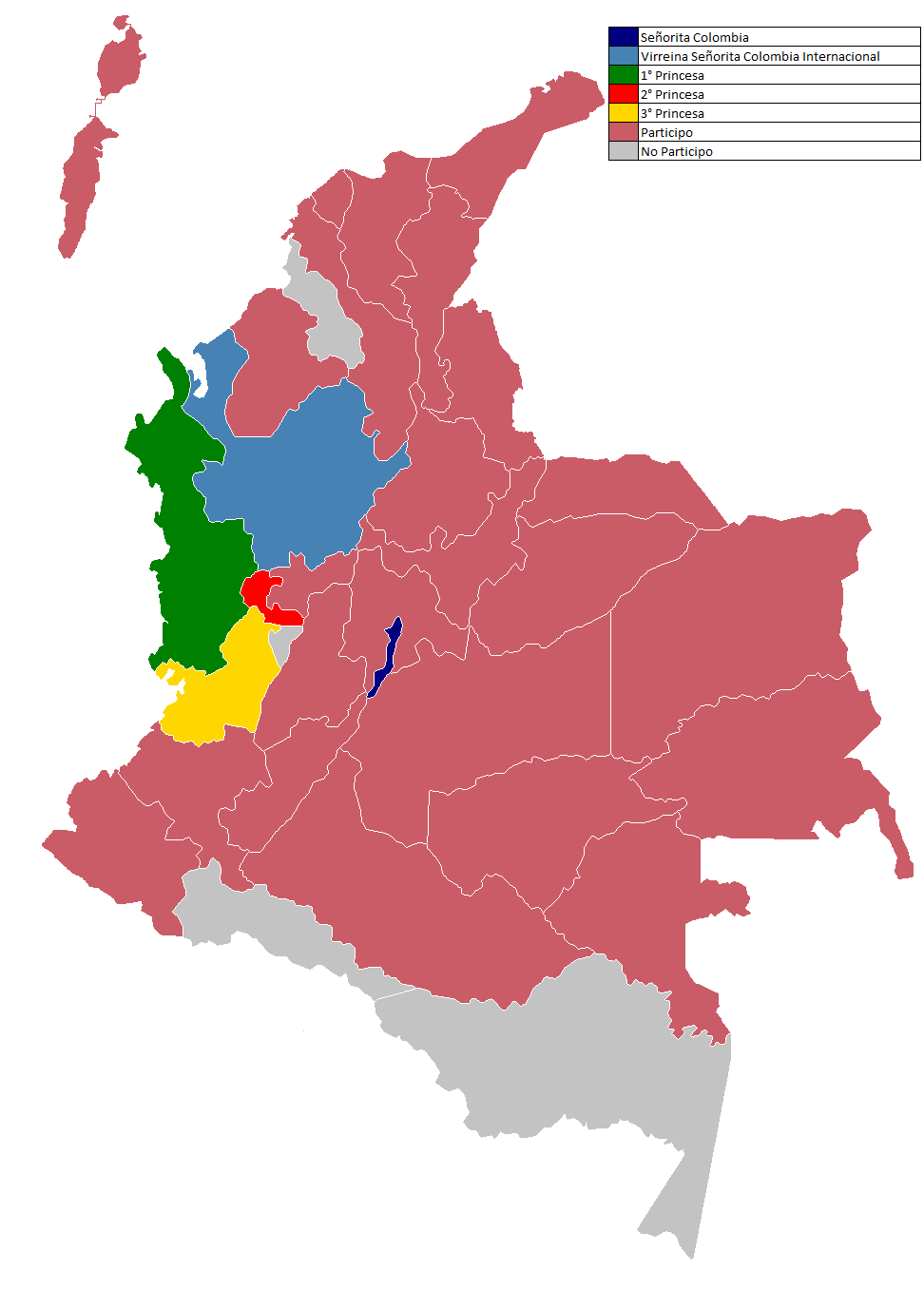
Señorita Colombia 1993

=== Placements ===
Final results	Contestant
Miss Colombia 1993	Bogotá – Carolina Gómez
1st Runner-Up	Antioquia – Alexandra Marín
2nd Runner-Up	Chocó – Aura Serna Mosquera
3rd Runner-Up	Risaralda – Elsy Hoyos Tamayo
4th Runner-Up	Valle – Diana Isabel Romero

=== Special awards ===
- Most Beautiful Hair- Valle Diana Isabel Romero
- Reina de la policia - Meta Norma Herrera Leal
- Best Regional Costume - Valle Diana Isabel Romero
- Miss Congeniality - Cesar Cecilia Fernández Angarita

== Delegates ==
30 delegates were selected to compete.

Representing	Name
Antioquia	Alexandra Betancur Marín
Arauca	Milena Patricia Giraldo Jiménez
Atlántico	Beatriz Eugenia Vélez Vengoechea
Bolívar	Maria Victoria González Ocampo
Boyacá	Sonia Luz Galeano Vélez
Caldas	Adriana Hernández Zuluaga
Caquetá	Piedad Castillo Mejía
Casanare	Gloria Eugenia Calle Andrades
Cauca	Valentina López Baytala
Cesar	Rosnaira Cecilia Fernández Angarita
Chocó	Aura Elizabeth Serna Mosquera
Córdoba	Deyanira del Carmen Heilbron Buelvas
Cundinamarca	Sandra Lucía Pérez Londoño
Guainía	María Marcela Serrano Camacho
La Guajira	Socorro María Ortíz Carrillo
Guaviare	Yamile Plata Moreno
Huila	María de los Ángeles Alarcón Vargas
Magdalena	María de los Ángeles Chapman Algarín
Meta	Norma Dalila Herrera Leal
Nariño	Georgina Gambino Rosero
Norte de Santander	Delia Zulay Gómez Quintero
Risaralda	Elsy Janeth Hoyos Tamayo
San Andrés y Providencia	Julie Claudeth Howard Archbold
Santander	María Jimena Gómez Ordoñez
Santafé de Bogotá	Carolina Gómez Correa
Tolima	Nayibe María Yanine Montoya
Valle del Cauca	María Isabel Romero Carrillo
Vaupés	Sandra Soraya Giraldo Ladino
Vichada	Luz Adriana Ruíz Jaramillo
