= The Last Cop (2010 TV series) =

- The show's title card
- Written by: Robert Dannenberg; Stefan Scheich
- Starring: Henning Baum; Maximilian Grill; Proschat Madani; Helmfried von Lüttichau; Robert Lohr
- Opening theme: "Real Wild Child (Wild One)" by Iggy Pop (seasons 1–4); Vertigo by U2 (season 5)
- Composer: Thomas Klemm
- Country of origin: Germany
- Original language: German
- No. of seasons: 6
- No. of episodes: 68 (list of episodes)

Production
- Production locations: Essen, Germany
- Running time: 42 minutes
- Production companies: ITV Studios Germany greenskyfilms

Original release
- Network: Sat.1
- Release: 12 April 2010 – 2 June 2014
- Network: Amazon Prime Video
- Release: 31 October 2025 – present

Related
- Falco

The Last Cop (German: Der letzte Bulle) is a German television series that was first aired in 2010. The series is about a policeman from the 1980s put into a modern police department in Essen.

== Plot ==
The show is set in Essen, in the center of the Rhine-Ruhr metropolitan region, located in North Rhine West-Phalia. A large part of the 5th season also takes place in Cologne. Mick Brisgau is a homicide detective who was shot in the head on duty in the late 1980s leading to a 20 year long coma. The show starts when he awakes suddenly from the coma and is allowed to return to his old job at the homicide department. As an old-school macho cop, he doesn't know about modern technology such as cellphones or computers, or modern investigation methods. The likes of the Domain Network System, CDs, the Internet, search engines and GPS are turnoffs for Mick, as is the realization that women now partake in soccer and men in wellness. He tries to deal with the modern world in general, and homicide cases in particular, as if it was still the 1980s.

The rough style of the main character (played by Henning Baum) is complemented by the prudence, professionalism and dullness of his new partner, Andreas Kringge (played by Maximilian Grill). Throughout the show's run, Mick and Andreas ultimately go from (very) reluctant partners to best friends. Other characters include

- Brisgau's former partner, Martin Ferchert, who is now head of the homicide department;
- Brisgau's wife Lisa, who divorces him during the first season;
- the medical examiner Roland Meisner, who has been living with Brisgau's wife for years, predictably leading to a somewhat fierce rivalry between the two men;
- Isabelle, Brisgau's adult daughter, whom he had only ever known as a baby;
- the police psychologist Tanja Haffner, who constantly expresses concern for Mick's wellbeing

The series uses songs from the 1980s, sometimes to comment on the plot, and features other items from the decade such as Brisgau's Opel Diplomat V8. which he continues to use as his service vehicle.

Seasons 1-3 and 6 are primarily episodic, while seasons 4 and 5 take a more serialized approach, focusing on Mick's past, both before and after he wound up in a coma. Following the show's 5th season, Mick goes on vacation, but a plane crash leads to him being stranded on an island in the Pacific for several years. The show's 6th season has him return to Essen, where he reluctantly joins the police force once more.

== Production and transmission ==
The series ran first on 12 April 2010 on Sat.1 Television with 2.99 million viewers (or 9.2 percent) somewhat below the average of the TV channel. Of the target demographic (people ages 14 to 49), 1.68 million people watched the premiere, translating to a market share of 13.2% for Sat.1, better than average. Beginning with the airing of the second episode, "The Last Cop" managed to continuously increase its audience count all the way until the season finale. The twelfth episode brought in the show's best numbers yet, having been viewed by 3.41 million people (with 1.77 million in the 14 to 49 demographic). Overall, the season's 13 episodes were viewed by an average of 3.03 million people, of which 1.58 million belonged to the target demographic. This view count translated to a market share of 10.1 and 13.7%, respectively.

With the start of the second season on March 14, 2011, the viewer share almost doubled to 4.09 million viewers (2.11 million were part of the target demographic) and Sat.1 ordered a third season, which premiered on February 6, 2012. The fourth season aired in Germany beginning 21 January 2013.

The show has been aired in combination with the Sat.1 production Danni Lowinski from the start, but while the latter scored better in the beginning it is now The Last Cop that shows better results. With a viewer share of 15% for The Last Cop and with the two series being the best-running productions of Sat.1, it was announced on 9 April 2013 that a fifth season was being planned for both shows. The fifth season of The Last Cop aired on April 24, 2014, but it ran on Sat.1 emotions instead of Sat.1. On October 31, 2025, more than ten years after the fifth season had concluded, a sixth season was released on Prime Video. The new season was then aired on Sat.1 about a month later.

The series has been sold to neighbouring countries; it has run on Austrian ÖRF since 31 May 2011. The French Direct 8 has run a dubbed version since March 2012 under the title of Mick Brisgau, le come-back d’un super flic. It is also dubbed for Italian Rai 1 where it runs under the title of Last Cop - L'ultimo sbirro during the summer. In Bulgaria, the series runs as Ченге от миналото on Diema in a dubbed version. In Brazil the show is being aired on cable channel Globosat+ under the name O Último Policial, in German language with Portuguese subtitles. In Spain the series is dubbed and runs as El último poli duro on Canal+ Spain and Cuatro.

== Cast ==
Timeline

● Main cast, (S) supporting cast, (G) guest star

Rolle	1	2	3	4	5	6
Michael „Mick“ Brisgau	●	●	●	●	●	●
Andreas Kringge	●	●	●	●	●	●
Martin Ferchert	●	●	●	●	●	●
Tanja Haffner	●	●	●	●		
Dr. Roland Meisner	●	●	●	●	●	(S)
Uschi Nowatzki	(S)	●	●	●	●	(S)
Lisa Brisgau	●	(G)				
Isabelle Brisgau	●	●		(G)	(S)	
Dana Kringge		(G)	(S)	(S)	(S)	(G)
Karl Kringge				(G)	(G)	(S)
Astrid Schuhmann					●	(S)
Ralf Berger						●
Carolin Berger						●

Main Cast

Character	Actor	Season	Episodes	Character Description
Michael „Mick“ Brisgau	Henning Baum	1–	1–	Homicide detective who wound up in a coma for 20 years after being shot. Father to Isabelle and Mick Jr. In season five, he serves as a uniformed cop for a few days, before eventually finding employment at the private security company Ruhrsafe-Security. Lived on an isolated island after surviving a plane crash and returns to Essen after eleven years, where he rejoins the homicide desk.
Andreas Kringge	Maximilian Grill	1–	1–	Mick's partner, joins the State Criminal Police Office in season five and becomes its director by the end of the season. In season six, he volunteers to be transferred back to the homicide desk in order to spend more time with his family. Briefly works as a uniformed cop alongside Mick.
Martin Ferchert	Helmfried von Lüttichau	1–	1–	Captain of the homicide desk, assumes leadership of the public relations department in season three, then resumes his old position in season four. In season five, he goes into politics. As of season six, he is once again the captain of the homicide desk.
Tanja Haffner	Proschat Madani	1–4	1–43, 45–52	Police psychologist, becomes the new homicide captain in season three, resumes her old position in season four. Following season four, she emigrates to Argentina.

Dr. Roland Meisner	Robert Lohr	1–	1–	A forensic scientist who is a rival to Mick, due to his relationship with Mick's ex-wife while he was in a coma. After season four, Meisner created the company Meisner Technology. In season six, he acts as Carolin's temporary replacement while she is on vacation.
Uschi Nowatzki	Tatjana Clasing	1–	1–	Owner of Mick's favorite bar and is good friends with him, Andreas, Tanja and Roland. Is also Martin's life companion.
Lisa Brisgau	Floriane Daniel	1–2	1–14	Mick's ex-wife and Meisner's ex-fiancée.
Isabelle Brisgau	Luise Risch	1–2, 4–5	2–15, 20, 23, 48, 55–56, 58–60	Mick's daughter, initially works as a banker, then at an advertising firm in season five.
Ralf Berger	Torben Liebrecht	6	61–	The district attorney, Ferchert's boss, and Carolin Berger's husband.
Carolin Berger	Peri Baumeister	6	62–	Forensic scientist, Ralf Berger's wife. Is currently having an affair with Mick.

Supporting Cast

Character	Actor	Season	Episodes	Character Description
Dana Kringge (Maiden Name. Riedmüller)	Karoline Schuch	2–4	24–52	Wife of Andreas Kringge
Dana Kringge (Maiden Name. Riedmüller)	Julia Hartmann	5, 6	53–60, 67–68	Wife of Andreas Kringge
Dr. Niklas Hold	René Steinke	3	27–38	A former friend of Tanja's.
Christine Wegner	Suzan Anbeh	3	28–33	Reporter and Roland Meisner's sister.
Bernhard Schaller	Hendrik Duryn	3–4	39–40, 50–52	A probation officer and the one responsible for Mick's coma.
Stefanie Averdunk	Franziska Weisz	4	43–51	Controller at the Financial department. Had a fling with Mick.
Arno Fieber	Bernd Michael Lade	4	44–52	Murderer of Klaus Beck and attempted to have Mick killed. He kidnaps Andreas while fleeing, but Mick is able to track him down, saving Andreas and arresting Fieber.
Ansgar Körting	August Schmölzer	4	49–52	Ordered the death of Klaus Becker and tried to have Mick killed.
Holger Brawitsch	Mišel Matičević	5	53–54; 59	A colleague of Andreas at the SCPO, is killed during a meeting with Mick.

Lutz Görnemann	Adam Bousdoukos	5	53–59	Another colleague of Andreas at the SCPO, is killed by Klaus Koller.
Klaus Koller	Oliver Stokowski	5	53, 60	Director of the SCPO (Stokowski previously played the role of Headmaster Abraham in the season three episode "I'll Say No More")
Vera Koller	Susanna Simon	5	53–60	Wife of Klaus Koller, is accidentally shot and killed by Koller during a cash handover (Simon previously played the role of Inga Klein in the season four episode "Waste of Time")
Astrid Schuhmann	Christina Hecke	5–	54–	Had a one-night-stand with Mick, leading to the birth of Mick Jr.
Rüdiger Bremme	Oliver Stritzel	5	54–60	Koller's successor at the SCPO
Anja Russeck	Yangzom Brauen	5	55–60	Andreas' partner at the SCPO
Erwin Brisgau	Paul Faßnacht	5	55–60	Mick's father and Isa's grandfather, who lives in Monaco (Fassnacht previously played the role of Ecki Troller in the season one episode "The round shape must go in the square hole", as well as the instructor Koslik in the season four episode "Those Who Fly Too High")
Tilda Frank	Karen Dahmen	6	61–63	Andreas' new partner on the homicide desk, eventually transfers to the SCPO

Karl Kringge	Lauri Kröck	6	61–	Son of Dana and Andreas Kringge

== Remakes ==
=== French ===
Falco is the series that started in 2013.

=== U.S. ===
At Turner Upfront TNT had announced the production of a pilot for a US remake (titled "The Last Cop") of the German series in May 2013. The adaptation would have seen the 1990s cop Mick Branigan awakening after 20 years in coma and returning to his job at the LAPD. The pilot was produced by Sylvester Stallone with Fuse Entertainment and Fox Television Studios co-producing the show for TNT. However, the series never panned out.

=== Estonian ===
Kanal 2 started the series under name Viimane võmm (The Last Cop) in 2014. The main characters are Mikk Kotkas (actor Üllar Saaremäe), Anders Prikk (actor Robert Annus) and Tanja Murrik (actress Ülle Lichtfeldt). Kotkas drives old white Volvo 700-series wagon.

=== Japanese ===
Nippon Television Network and Hulu announced the production of a mini-series for a Japanese remake of the German series, which began to air starting in the summer 2015.

=== Russian ===
Petersburg – Channel 5 produced first two seasons (39 episodes) of Последний мент (The Last Cop) in 2015–2016. Gosha Kutsenko plays the lead role - captain Alexey Divov.

=== Czech ===
The Czech remake Polda (The Cop) premiered on 23 October 2016. Five seasons ran on TV Prima.

== Trivia ==
- In episode 4 "Nightshift", a DJ working a party at the Vesuvio restaurant lists off several excellent (in his opinion) old TV shows during an argument with the host. One of these is "The Clown" from the late 90s, with the DJ's actor, Sven Martinek, having played the main character of that very show.
- In episode 19 "The Naked Tankers from Huttrop", Peter Fieseler portrays the murder victim Adam Ritter. In the show "The Savior - We are Attorneys" he portrayed the defense attorney Ben Ritter.
- In episode 26 "The Missed Chance", Brisgau and Kringge's current homicide case takes them to a steel mill. The man they are looking for works in Sector 7G, according to works council member Ziller. This is a reference to the Simpsons, where Homer Simpson also works in Sector 7G as a safety inspector at a nuclear power plant.
- In episode 31 "Nymphs and Don Juans", Andreas teasingly refers to Mick as "Mister Undercover Love", due to the latter's undercover investigation into a sex therapy group. In the 2010 movie "Undercover Love", Henning Baum played the main character Johannes Mueller.
- At the end of episode 41 "Nail in the Heart", Mick and Andreas go into a cabin in the middle of the woods where the former had previously hidden out in the prior episode. In an ironic twist, the song "Our House (in the middle of the street) by Madness plays as this scene occurs.
- In episode 44 "Our little street", the song "We belong together" by Randy Newman can be heard playing. Newman's song is part of the Toy Story 3 soundtrack.
- In episode 47 "Those Who Fly Too High", a young recruit at the police academy is murdered. When Brisgau and Kringge investigate the academy, the main theme of the film series "Police Academy", composed by Robert Folk, can be heard in the background. Later in the episode, Mick attempts to hit a small porcelain figurine with a bullwhip, as he does this, John Williams' Raiders March from Indiana Jones is briefly played.
- In episode 51 "Romeo and Juliet", "The Last Cop" has a crossover with the show "Danni Lowinski". Danni rides her bike through a residential area of Essen and happens to come across Mick and Andreas. Mick introduces her to Andreas as his attorney.
- As the fourth season aired on television, animated shorts were released concurrently on Sat.1's website. These shorts depict Mick's life in the 80s, beginning with his first few months on the job up until he wound up in a coma. Henning Baum acts as the narrator.
- In February 2013, the first book based on the series, titled "Blood Sausage Blues" was published. It was written by Stefan Scheich, who would go on to write other books based on "The Last Cop" and was also a writer for the show in its early years.

== Reviews ==
"All in all, "The Last Cop" is a halfway entertaining, yet also a consistently charming crime drama, thanks to Henning Baum's performance. Audiences can easily give this show a chance. However, it likely won't gain a major following, it's simply too formulaic."

- Meedia.de

"The rough macho man and the soft-spoken guy make for an excellent pairing, even if the cases they solve are a bit uninteresting. As a counterbalance to this, the series features plenty of 80s music."

- Kino.de

== DVD Releases ==
In partnership with Sony Music and Merchandising Media, Sat.1 released a DVD box set of the entire first season on July 23, 2010, notably before the final two episodes of the season had even aired. The box includes three DVDs and has a total runtime of about 570 minutes.

The second season has been available on DVD since June 17, 2011. Just as before, the DVD set was released before the entire season had aired on television. The third season has been on DVD since May 25, 2012. The first three seasons were compiled into one box collection with nine DVDs on November 23, 2012. The fourth season came out on DVD on May 24, 2013. The fifth season released on DVD on May 30, 2014.

== Movie ==
On November 7, 2019, a feature film with the same name was released in German cinemas, with Henning Baum reprising his role as Mick Brisgau.

== Awards and nominations ==
- 2010: nominated for the Golden Camera award for best investigator duo
- 2011: Henning Baum was awarded the Bavarian TV Prize for best lead actor. The award also went to authors Stefan Scheich and Robert Dannenberg
- 2011: nominated for the German TV Prize for best show
- 2012: awarded the German TV Prize for best show
- 2014: awarded the Jupiter for best German TV show
- 2015: Honored with the GdP star from the Hesse police union, for the show's humanistic portrayal of Mick Brisgau
