= Was nicht passt, wird passend gemacht (TV series) =

German television series

- Starring: Ralf Richter
- Country of origin: Germany

Was nicht passt, wird passend gemacht is a German television series which is based on the 2002 film of the same name.

== See also ==
- List of German television series
