= Ventino =

Colombian Latin pop girl group

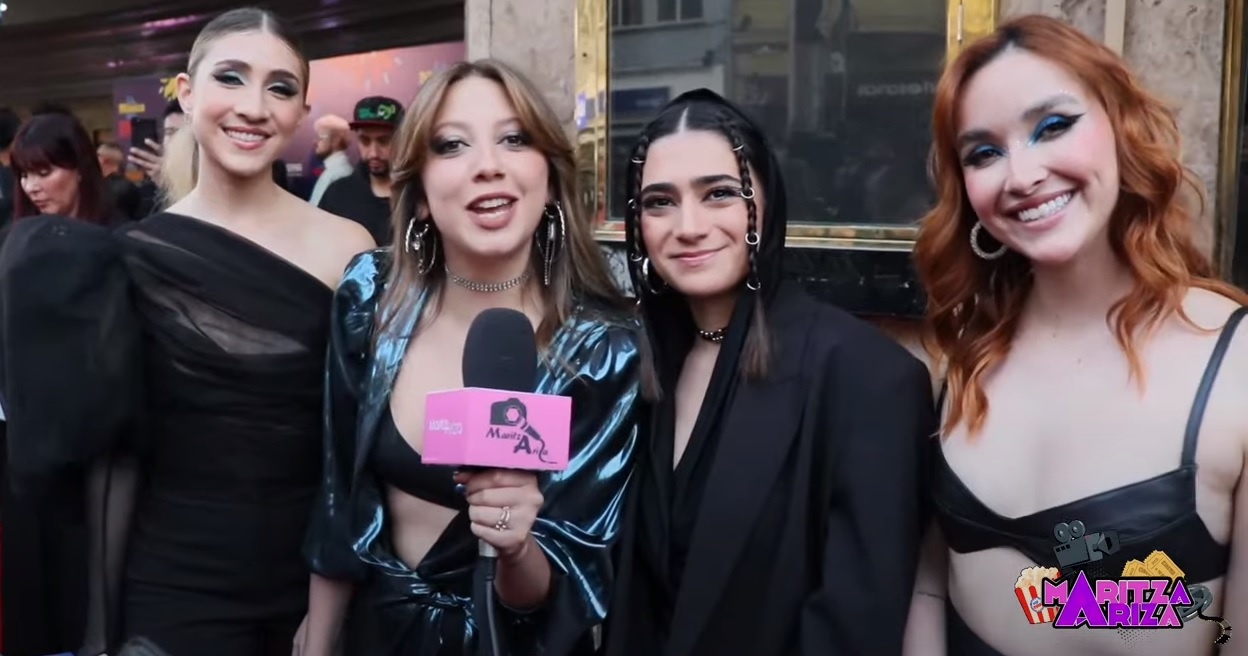
- Ventino members at 2023 Premios Nuestra Tierra

Background information
- Origin: Bogotá, Colombia
- Genres: Latin pop; Ballad; Pop
- Years active: 2016 - present
- Labels: Sony Music Colombia
- Members: María Cristina de Angulo; Camila Esguerra; Natalia Alfanador; Olga Lucía Vives
- Past members: Juliana Pérez

Ventino is a Latin pop girl group, formed in Bogotá, Colombia, that first gained popularity on YouTube, singing cover versions before becoming known for their original material. They released their self-titled debut album in 2018. Its members are María Cristina "Makis" de Angulo, Camila Esguerra, Natalia Afanador and Olga Lucía Vives.

== Career ==
=== Formation ===
Prior to their formation, each of the group's members performed in musical theater productions at their respective high schools. Natalia Afanador and Juliana Pérez attended the same high school (Gimnasio La Montaña), while Camila Esguerra, Makis de Angulo and Olga Vives attended a neighboring school (Colegio Los Nogales). On October 22, 2014, Camila Esguerra and Natalia Afanador uploaded their first video to YouTube, a mashup cover of Sia's "Chandelier" and Rihanna's "Diamonds".

=== YouTube covers and rising popularity ===
In 2015 a friend of all five then future-members, Juan David Muñoz gathered the five young women together to record a video of them singing a mashup of various Disney Princess songs. On April 8, 2015 they uploaded the video to YouTube. Within a month "Disney Princess Mashup" surpassed a million views. It was this experience that led the five members to pursue music as a group with Muñoz continuing to work with them as a producer and mentor. They spent much of 2015 and 2016 recording and uploading covers of artists such as Sam Smith, Queen, Adele and Beyoncé.

After a year together, as the group's popularity grew, they met Pedro Malaver who, at the time, managed Cali & El Dandee and Morat. He arranged a meeting with Sony Music Colombia who signed them to a record deal.

=== Christmas album and debut studio album ===
Following their record deal with Sony Music Colombia, Ventino began working on their debut album.

On October 14, 2016 they released their debut single, "Me Equivoque". Its video reached over 95 million views. They spent the remainder of 2016 and 2017 releasing a string of singles leading up to their self-titled debut album. The singles "Apaga y Vamonos" and "Si Decides (Baby)" spread their popularity to Spain and throughout Latin America. Prior to releasing their debut studio album, the group recorded and released a Christmas album, Ya Es Navidad, on November 17, 2017. The album was produced by Colombian singer, songwriter and producer Santiago Deluchi.

They released their debut studio album Ventino on August 17, 2018.

=== Continued singles and second studio album ===
Following the release of their self-titled album, the group continued recording new music and released "Yo Te Quiero Más" in November 2018. The release was a collaboration with Colombian singer Mike Bahia. In February 2019 they followed "Yo Te Quiero Mas" with a new single, "Ya Te Perdone", "Andan Diciendo", and "Don Juan."

=== New Ep - Otra Noche ===
On September 13, 2019, the group released a new 4 track ep entitled Otra Noche. The EP's tracks expanded on the ballad and midtempo sound that they are popular for and the group was lauded for their versatility in sound and for the group's vocals. It features collaborations with Jeon and Roman. In support of this new project, the group embarked of a tour throughout Colombia, including their first acoustic concert.

== Discography ==
=== Albums ===
- Ya Es Navidad (2017)
- Ventino (2018)
- Otra noche EP" (2019)
