= IndieBo =

The Bogotá Independent Film Festival, or IndieBo, is a showcase of Colombian and international film held in Bogotá, Colombia. It was founded in September 2014.
