= Henning Baum =

German film and TV actor

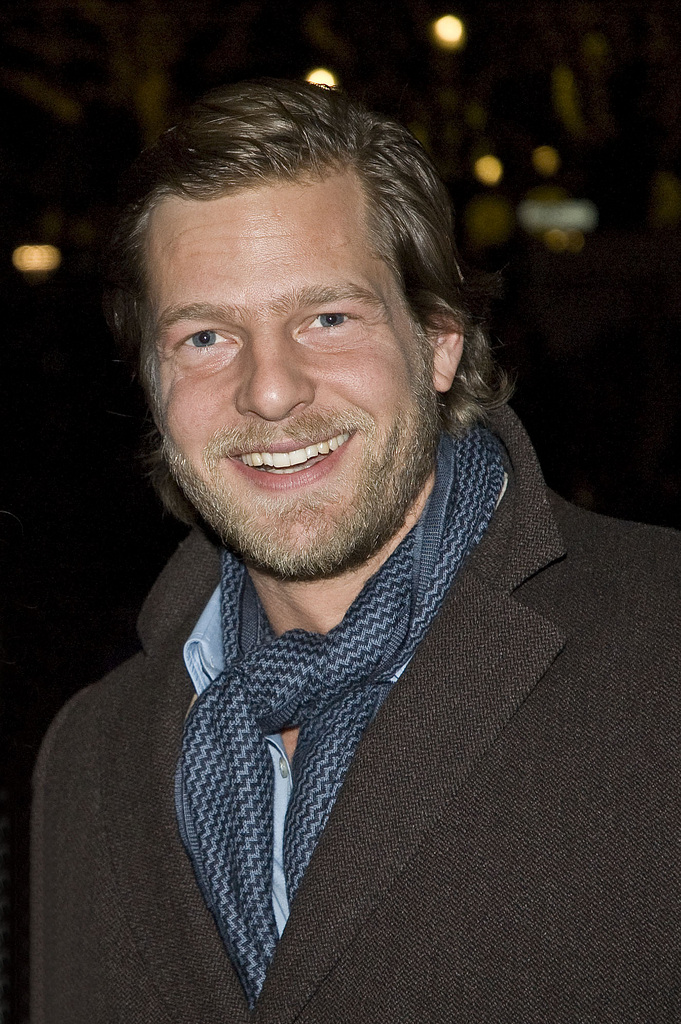
- Born: 20 September 1972; Essen, West Germany
- Occupation: Actor
- Years active: 1998-present

Henning Baum (born 20 September 1972) is a German film and TV actor. He is best known for his performance as Michael 'Mick' Brisgau in the TV Series Der letzte Bulle (The Last Cop). he is represented by Warren Bacci at TTA.

== Selected filmography ==
- Mädchen, Mädchen (2001), as Trainer Chris
- Hero of the Gladiators (2003, TV film), as Ceradoc
- The Cursed Treasure (2006, TV film), as Eike Brodersen
- Chubby Me (2007, TV film), as Konrad Hansen
- Die Masche mit der Liebe (2007, TV film), as Jan Richter
- The Last Cop (2010–2014, TV series, 60 episodes), as Mick Brisgau
- Undercover Love (2010, TV film), as Johannes Müller
- Iron Fist (2014, TV film), as Götz von Berlichingen
- After the Fall (2015, TV film), as Josef Halfen
- Shiverstone Castle (2016), as Gerhard "Rex" Maier
- Jim Button and Luke the Engine Driver (2018), as Luke the Engine Driver
