= Miss Universe 1993 =

42nd Miss Universe pageant

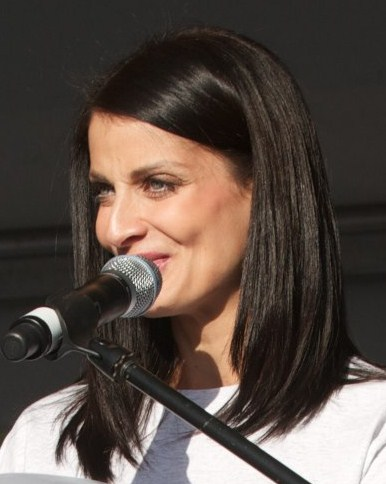
- Dayanara Torres
- Date: 21 May 1993
- Presenters: Dick Clark; Cecilia Bolocco; Angela Visser
- Venue: Auditorio Nacional, Mexico City, Mexico
- Broadcaster: CBS; TV Azteca
- Entrants: 79
- Placements: 10
- Debuts: Czech Republic; Estonia; Swaziland
- Withdrawals: Bermuda; Commonwealth of Independent States; Cook Islands; Czechoslovakia; Egypt; Kenya; Taiwan
- Returns: Belize; Ghana; Hong Kong; Italy; Trinidad and Tobago
- Winner: Dayanara Torres; Puerto Rico
- Congeniality: Jamila Haruna Danzuru (Ghana)
- Best National Costume: Ine Beate Strand (Norway)
- Photogenic: Eugenia Santana (Spain)

Miss Universe 1993 was the 42nd Miss Universe pageant, held at the Auditorio Nacional in Mexico City, Mexico, on 21 May 1993.

At the event's conclusion, Dayanara Torres of Puerto Rico was crowned Miss Universe 1993 by Michelle McLean of Namibia. Seventy-nine contestants competed in the pageant.

The pageant was hosted by Dick Clark for the fourth and final time, with commentary from Miss Universe 1987, Cecilia Bolocco and Miss Universe 1989, Angela Visser.

This was the third time the pageant was held in Mexico, two years after Lupita Jones won Mexico's first Miss Universe title in 1991. In the weeks prior to the final telecast, the contestants visited Campeche, Oaxaca, Zacatecas, Querétaro and the Mexican borough of Xochimilco for official events and sightseeing.

== Background ==
National Auditorium, the venue of the pageant

=== Location and date ===
On 13 July 1992, Miss Universe Inc. and Canal 13 Mexico director Romeo Flores announced that this edition would happen at the Auditorio Nacional in Mexico City. The hosting of Miss Universe in Mexico was supported by the then-president of Mexico, Carlos Salinas de Gortari. Aside from Mexico City, the candidates also visited the states of Campeche, Oaxaca, Zacatecas, Querétaro, and the borough of Xochimilco for official activities before the final competition.

A few days before the final competition, the president of the Miss Mexico organization, Carlos Guerrero, announced that Miss Universe would be held in Mexico again in 1995. Negotiations did not push through, and the competition occurred in Namibia, the first African country to host Miss Universe. Miss Universe was held again in Mexico in 2007.

=== Selection of participants ===
Contestants from seventy-nine countries and territories were selected to compete in the pageant. One contestant was selected to replace the original dethroned winner.

==== Replacements ====
The winner of Eesti Miss Estonia 1993, Lilia Üksvärav, was replaced due to being underage. Her first runner-up, Kersti Tänavsuu, became the country's debut participant at Miss Universe pageant.

==== Debuts, returns and withdrawals ====
This edition marked the debuts of the Czech Republic, Estonia, and Swaziland and the returns of Belize, Ghana, Hong Kong, Italy, and Trinidad and Tobago, which last competed in 1991. Pavlína Babůrková of the Czech Republic was originally crowned as Miss Czechoslovakia 1992, but after the split into the Czech Republic and Slovakia, Babůrková represented the former country.

Russian, Yuliya Etina of the Commonwealth of Independent States withdrew from the pageant due to undisclosed reasons, just a few days after arriving in Mexico.

Indira Sudiro of Indonesia was also supposed to compete in this edition, but she withdrew due to controversies surrounding her participation in the pageant. She would eventually attend the Miss Universe 1993 pageant as an observer.

=== Incidents during the competition ===
The pageant was marred by booing from the Mexican crowd following the failure of the home delegate, Angelina González, to advance to the top ten of the national costume competition and being not in the ten semifinalists. This was particularly directed towards the American candidate, Kenya Moore, the country that owns the Miss Universe Organization.

This continued throughout the first two events of the night: the swimsuit and interview competition. The Mexican crowd only calmed down after the musical number with Michelle McLean and the delegates singing and dancing to "Get on Your Feet" . Generalized booing stopped and the competition continued with the evening gown event, the judges' questions, the final question and the crowning, without major incident.

== Results ==
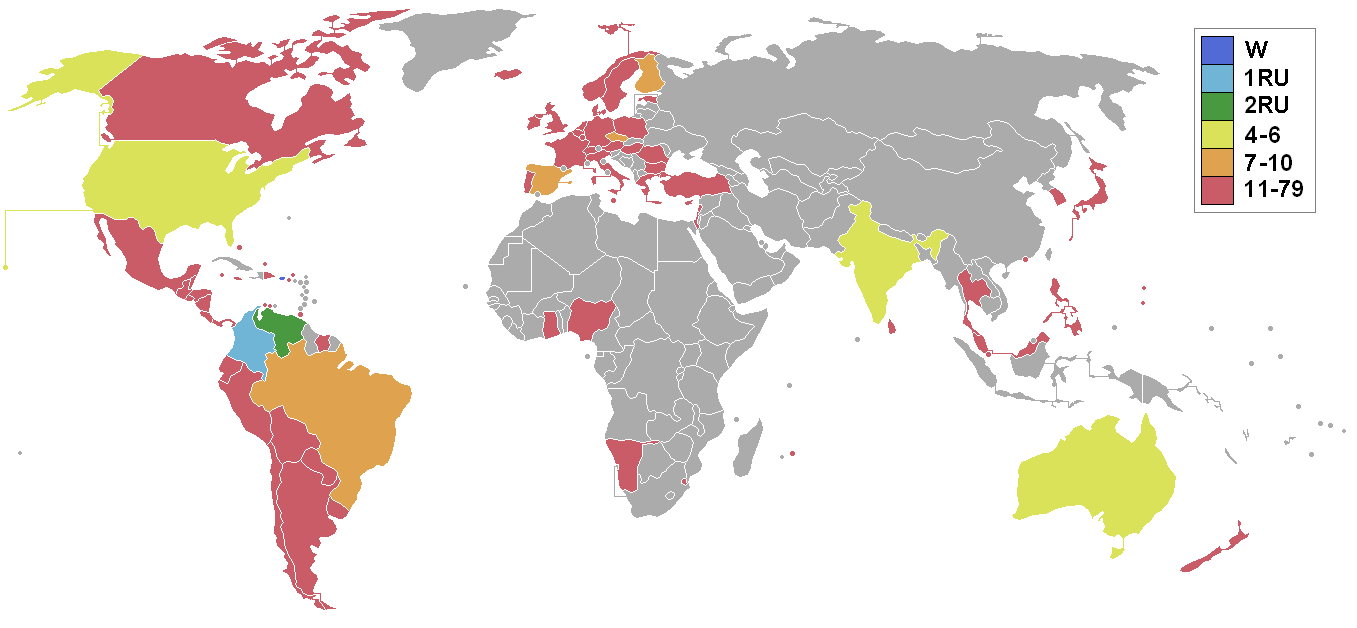
Miss Universe 1993 participating countries and territories

=== Placements ===
Placement	Contestant
Miss Universe 1993	Puerto Rico – Dayanara Torres
1st Runner-Up	Colombia – Paula Andrea Betancur
2nd Runner-Up	Venezuela – Milka Chulina
Top 6	Australia – Yvonne Voni Delfos; India – Namrata Shirodkar; United States – Kenya Moore
Top 10	Brazil – Leila Cristine Schuster; Czech Republic – Pavlína Babůrková; Finland – Tarja Smura; Spain – Eugenia Santana

=== Special awards ===
Award	Winner
Miss Photogenic	Spain – Eugenia Santana
Miss Congeniality	Ghana – Jamila Danzuru

==== Best National Costume ====
Award	Winner
Best National Costume	Norway – Ine Beate Strand
1st runner-up	Lebanon – Samaya Chadrawi
2nd runner-up	Turkey – Ipek Gumusoglu

== Contestants ==
Seventy-nine contestants competed for the title.

Country/Territory	Contestant	Age (Note: Ages at the time of the pageant)	Hometown
Argentina	Alicia Andrea Ramón	19	Resistencia
Aruba	Dyane Escalona	19	Oranjestad
Australia	Yvonne Voni Delfos	18	Brisbane
Austria	Rosemary Bruckner	21	Vienna
Bahamas	Marietta Ricina Sands	24	Nassau
Belgium	Sandra Joine	24	Antwerp
Belize	Melanie Smith	20	Belize City
Bolivia	Roxana Arias	19	Santa Cruz de la Sierra
Brazil	Leila Schuster	21	São Paulo
British Virgin Islands	Rhonda Hodge	19	Road Town
Bulgaria	Lilia Koeva	18	Sofia
Canada	Nancy Ann Elder	21	Calgary
Cayman Islands	Pamela Ebanks	19	George Town
Chile	Savka Pollak	19	Santiago
Colombia	Paula Andrea Betancur	21	Leticia
Costa Rica	Catalina Rodriguez	19	Heredia
Curaçao	Elsa Roozendal	19	Willemstad
Cyprus	Photini Spyridonos	19	Larnaca
Czech Republic	Pavlína Babůrková	19	Nový Bor
Denmark	Maria Hirse	21	Copenhagen
Dominican Republic	Odalisse Rodriguez	21	Santo Domingo
Ecuador	Arianna Mandini Klein	19	Guayaquil
El Salvador	Katherine Mendez	20	San Salvador
Estonia	Kersti Tänavsuu	20	Tallinn
Finland	Tarja Smura	22	Helsinki
France	Veronique de la Cruz	18	Guadeloupe
Germany	Verona Feldbusch	25	Hamburg
Ghana	Jamila Haruna Danzuru	25	Kumasi
Great Britain	Kathryn Middleton	24	Chesterfield
Greece	Kristina Manoussi	21	Athens
Guam	Charlene Gumataotao	21	Hågat
Guatemala	Diana Galván	19	San Rafael Pie de la Cuesta
Honduras	Denia Reyes	18	La Ceiba
Hong Kong	Emily Lo	19	Hong Kong
Hungary	Zsanna Pardy	20	Balatonfüred
Iceland	Maria Run Haflidadóttir	20	Reykjavík
India	Namrata Shirodkar	22	Bombay
Ireland	Sharon Ellis	22	Cork
Israel	Yana Khodyrker	20	Rehovot
Italy	Elisa Jacassi	21	Vercelli
Jamaica	Rachel Stuart	20	Kingston
Japan	Yukiko Shiki	24	Takarazuka
Lebanon	Samaya Chadrawi	19	Jounieh
Luxembourg	Nathalie dos Santos	18	Luxembourg
Malaysia	Lucy Narayanasamy	18	Banting
Malta	Roberta Borg	18	Qormi
Mauritius	Danielle Pascal	26	Port Louis
Mexico	Angelina González	18	Campeche
Namibia	Anja Schroder	23	Windhoek
Netherlands	Angelique van Zalen	22	Heemstede
New Zealand	Karly Kinnaird	19	Auckland
Nicaragua	Luisa Urcuyo	18	Managua
Nigeria	Rhihole Gbinigie	19	Lagos
Northern Mariana Islands	Victoria Todela	20	Saipan
Norway	Ine Beate Strand	21	Buskerud
Panama	Giselle González	20	Santiago de Veraguas
Paraguay	Carolina Barrios	18	Encarnación
Peru	Déborah de Souza-Peixoto	24	Lima
Philippines	Melinda Joanna Gallardo	22	Manila
Poland	Marzena Wolska	23	Warsaw
Portugal	Marisa Cruz	18	Lisbon
Puerto Rico	Dayanara Torres	18	Toa Alta
Romania	Angelica Nicoara	20	Lipova
Singapore	Renagah Devi	23	Singapore
South Korea	Yoo Ha-young	18	Seoul
Spain	Eugenia Santana	19	Las Palmas
Sri Lanka	Chamila Wickramesinghe	21	Colombo
Suriname	Jean Zhang	18	Paramaribo
Swaziland	Danila Faias	18	Manzini
Sweden	Johanna Lind	21	Åtvidaberg
Switzerland	Valérie Bovard	21	Vaud
Thailand	Chattharika Ubolsiri	21	Bangkok
Trinidad and Tobago	Rachel Charles	19	Tobago
Turkey	Ipek Gumusoglu	21	Istanbul
Turks and Caicos Islands	Michelle Mills	22	Grand Turk
United States	Kenya Moore	22	Detroit
United States Virgin Islands	Cheryl Simpson	19	Saint Croix
Uruguay	María Fernanda Navarro	19	Montevideo
Venezuela	Milka Chulina	19	Maracay
