= Paola Turbay =

Colombian-American actress (born 1970)

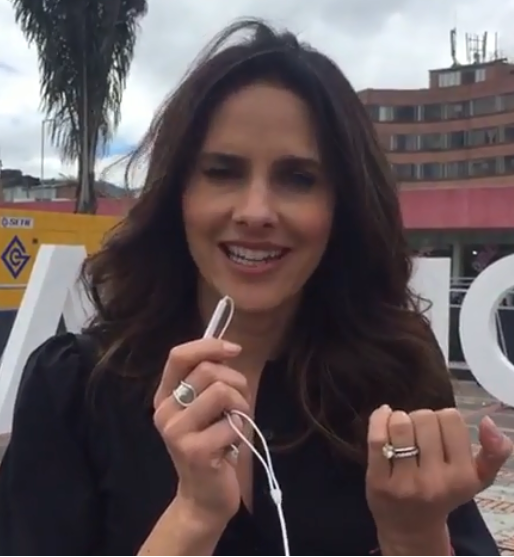
- Turbay in 2017
- Born: Paola Turbay Gómez; November 29, 1970 (age 55); Houston, Texas, U.S.
- Education: University of Los Andes (BP)
- Occupations: Beauty pageant titleholder; model; actress; television personality; TV host
- Height: 5 ft 7 in (1.70 m)
- Beauty pageant titleholder
- Title: Miss Bogotá 1991; Miss Colombia 1991
- Hair color: Brown
- Eye color: Green
- Major competitions: Miss Colombia 1991 (Winner); Miss Universe 1992 (1st Runner-Up)

Paola Turbay Gómez (born November 29, 1970) is a Colombian-American actress, model, tv host and beauty pageant titleholder. She was a regular in season 3 of the TV series Bosch.

== Career ==
Related to Colombian former president Julio César Turbay Ayala, Turbay represented Bogotá in the Miss Colombia beauty pageant and won in 1991. She was the first runner-up in the 1992 Miss Universe competition.

After finishing her studies in psychology at the Universidad de los Andes, Turbay focused on her career as a model and presenter in entertainment news segments on Noticias QAP and Noticiero C newscasts, as well as an actress. In 2005 she was the official presenter, with Miguel Varoni, of the National Beauty Pageant. She has also made cameo appearances in several Colombian series like O todos en la cama, Ecomoda (sequel to Betty la fea) and Leche ("Milk").

After studying acting in Hollywood, Florida, Turbay became the main character of the RCN TV comedy Noticias calientes ("Hot News") in 2002. Two years later she would star the telenovela Las noches de Luciana ("The Nights of Luciana") and in 2006 would present the Colombian version of Dancing with the Stars, Bailando por un Sueño. Paola has also made brief appearances in films such as Lenny the Wonder Dog and Love in the Time of Cholera.

In 2007, Turbay played Isabel Vega on the CBS series Cane, which was canceled in May 2008 after only one season. In 2008 she has been participating as a recurring guest star on the ABC series The Secret Life of the American Teenager. She also guested on the Showtime series Californication (Season 2, ep. 8, "Going Down and Out in Beverly Hills") and had a recurring role as an LAPD detective during the fifth season of TNT's The Closer.

On January 6, 2010, she played the role of Beatriz on the CBS series The Mentalist (Season 3, ep. 11, "Bloodsport").

Paola played the role of Antonia Gavilán de Logroño for the fourth season of the HBO series True Blood.

Starting in 2010, she had a recurring role on Royal Pains as Marissa Cassaras, Boris' love interest, and mother of his son.

In 2014 she founded IndieBo, the Bogotá Independent Film Festival, of which she is the executive director.

In 2017, she played Dr. Sophia Gallup in blacklist season 4 episode 16 "Dembe Zuma (No. 10)".

== Personal life ==
She married Alejandro Estrada in 1994. They have two children.

Awards and achievements
Preceded by (Netherlands) Pauline Huizinga	Miss Universe 1st Runner-Up; 1992	Succeeded by (Colombia) Paula Andrea Betancur
Preceded by Maribel Gutiérrez	Miss Colombia; 1991	Succeeded by Paula Andrea Betancur
