= Benjamin Herrmann =

German film producer and distributor (born 1971)

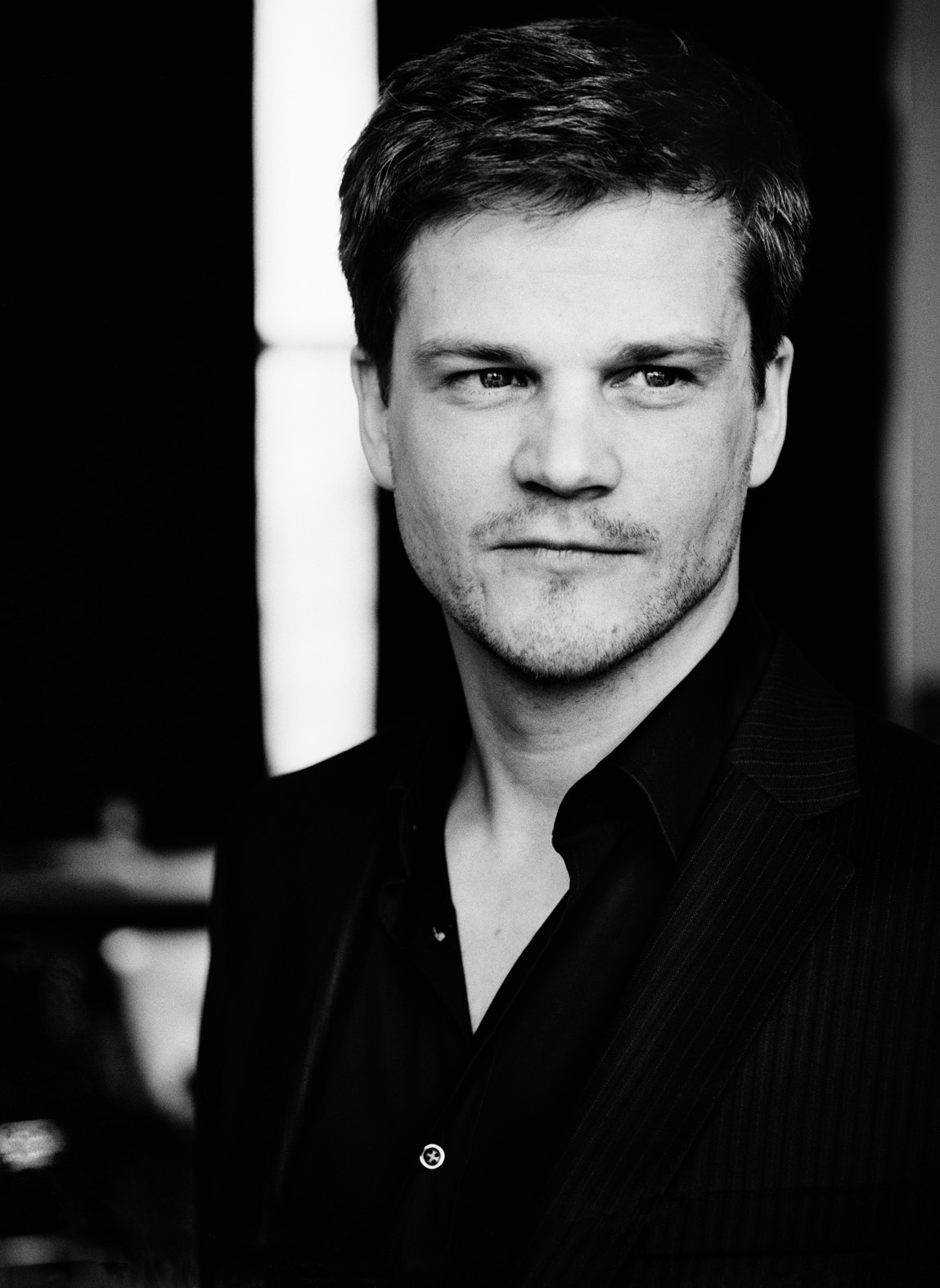
- 2008
- Born: 17 July 1971 (age 54); Friedberg, Hessen, West Germany
- Occupation(s): Film producer Film distributor

Benjamin Herrmann (born July 17, 1971) is a German film producer and distributor.

== Career ==
Benjamin Herrmann studied Directing at the Munich Academy for Film and Television. After graduating with his award-winning short film Der große Lacher (The Big Laugh) in 1997, he headed private broadcaster ProSieben’s production department, where he executive produced over 40 TV movies and feature films, including Germany’s most successful film of all times, Der Schuh des Manitu (Manitou's Shoe).

From 2000 to 2006 he was managing director of Germany’s mini-major Senator’s production and distribution outfits. There, he produced and distributed commercially successful and critically acclaimed films like Das Experiment, Das Wunder von Bern (The Miracle of Bern) and Academy Award-nominee Joyeux Noël (Merry Christmas). His distribution projects further included Ridley Scott’s Black Hawk Down, Lasse Hallström’s Chocolat, Jonathan Glazer’s Sexy Beast and Alejandro Amenábar’s The Others.

In 2006 he set up his own production and distribution company, Majestic. He quickly assembled a slate of highly successful films: Doris Dörrie’s box office hit Kirschblüten - Hanami (Cherry Blossoms), Philipp Stölzl’s mountain drama Nordwand (North Face), Sherry Hormann’s adaptation of Waris Dirie’s best-selling novel Desert Flower, Academy Award-winner Florian Gallenberger’s John Rabe, Hermine Huntgeburth’s adaptation of Mark Twain’s classic novel Tom Sawyer, David Wnendt’s adaptation of Charlotte Roche’s novel Wetlands and Christian Zübert’s Florian David Fitz starrer Tour de Force.

His production Colonia by Academy Award-winner Florian Gallenberger, starring Emma Watson, Daniel Brühl and Michael Nyqvist, had its world premiere at the Toronto International Film Festival and was released all over the world in 2016.

His production As Green As It Gets, again directed by long-time partner Florian Gallenberger, hat its world premiere in competition at the Shanghai International Film Festival in 2018.

To date, Majestic’s films have reached 10 million admissions in German cinemas and won 11 German Academy Awards.

For John Rabe Benjamin Herrmann was awarded with the German Academy Award. Furthermore, he received 3 Bavarian Film Awards for Best Picture for Desert Flower, John Rabe as well as for Colonia.

Benjamin is a member of the European Film Academy and chairman of the German Film Academy.

== Awards ==
Won

- 2016Bavarian Film Awards, Best Picture Colonia
- 2010 Bavarian Film Awards, Best Picture Desert Flower
- 2009 Bavarian Film Awards, Best Picture John Rabe
- 2009 German Academy Awards, Best Picture John Rabe
- 1998 Studio Hamburg Young Director's Award, Best Short Film Der große Lacher (The Big Laugh)

Nominated

- 2006 Academy Awards, Best Foreign Language Film Joyeux Noël (Merry Christmas)
- 1998 Max Ophüls Award, Best Short Film Der große Lacher (The Big Laugh)

== Filmography ==
The most well-known movies produced by Herrmann include

- Der Schuh des Manitu (Manitou's Shoe) (2001)
- Das Experiment (2001)
- If It Don't Fit, Use a Bigger Hammer (2002)
- Das Wunder von Bern (The Miracle of Bern) (2003)
- Joyeux Noël (Merry Christmas) (2005)
- Wo ist Fred? (Special) (2006)
- Nordwand (North Face) (2008)
- John Rabe (2009)
- Desert Flower (2009)
- Tom Sawyer (2011)
- Tour de Force (2014)
- Colonia (2015)
- As Green As It Gets (2019)
