= Cathleen Miller =

American writer

- Education: Pennsylvania State University
- Occupations: Author, travel writer, essayist, professor
- Known for: Champion of Choice, Desert Flower: The Extraordinary Journey of a Desert Nomad

Cathleen Miller is an internationally best-selling American writer based in England. Her 2013 book, Champion of Choice, is the biography of United Nations leader Nafis Sadik.

She is also the author of Desert Flower (1998), co-written with Waris Dirie—a Somali nomad turned model turned activist—who shared her experience with female genital mutilation to bring about global awareness. The book has been cited by the United Nations as having played a major role in the advocacy against female genital mutilation. Desert Flower was made into a feature film in 2009 and released in 34 countries. The print version sold over 11 million copies worldwide and has been translated into more than 55 languages.

== Biography ==
Cathleen Miller was born in the United States but has traveled widely in pursuit of research, adventure, and experience. "She has interviewed diplomats and heads of state on five continents, patients in an Addis Ababa Hospital, rape camp survivors in Kosovo, and midwives in the mountains of East Timor. Her work sometimes places her in strange circumstances, for example cruising St. Petersburg in a Winnebago to interview prostitutes, and running down a Brazilian mountain at midnight fleeing bandits."

Miller earned her MFA in Creative Writing from Pennsylvania State University in 1997. She was a professor in creative writing, specializing in Creative Nonfiction at San Jose State University from 2004 until her retirement in 2020. At San Jose State University, she also served as the editor-in-chief of Reed Magazine.

In 2018 she was named the Distinguished Chair of the Humanities at the University of Manchester and taught in their Creative Writing program while a Fulbright Scholar.

Miller co-founded Wild Writing Women, a group of women writers who travel worldwide and come together to write their stories of adventure. She was also a member of the Bay Area Travel Writers organization. Her work has appeared in many magazines and newspapers in the United States, including the San Francisco Chronicle, The Washington Post, Chicago Tribune, and Los Angeles Times.

== Awards ==
- 2018 Fulbright Scholars’ Award, Distinguished Chair of the Humanities, University of Manchester, United Kingdom
- 2017 Silicon Valley Creates Artist Laureate
- 2013 Champion of Choice: Top Ten Biography of 2013 by the American Library Association
- 2005 Lowell Thomas Gold Prize, Society of American Travel Writers, Best Online Travel Magazine (editor-in-chief)
- 2005 North American Travel Journalists Association Award, Best Online Travel Magazine (editor-in-chief)

== Bibliography ==
=== Nonfiction ===
- Champion of Choice: The Life and Legacy of Women's Advocate Nafis Sadik (March 2013)
- The Birdhouse Chronicles: Surviving the Joys of Country Life (October 2004)
- Desert Flower: The Extraordinary Journey Of A Desert Nomad (August 1998)

=== Anthologies ===
- Travelers’ Tales Best Travel Writing Volume 11 (November 2016)
- Travelers' Tales San Francisco: True Stories (November 2002)
- Wild Writing Women: Stories of World Travel (April 2002)
