= Waris Dirie =

Somali model, author, actress, and activist (born 1965)

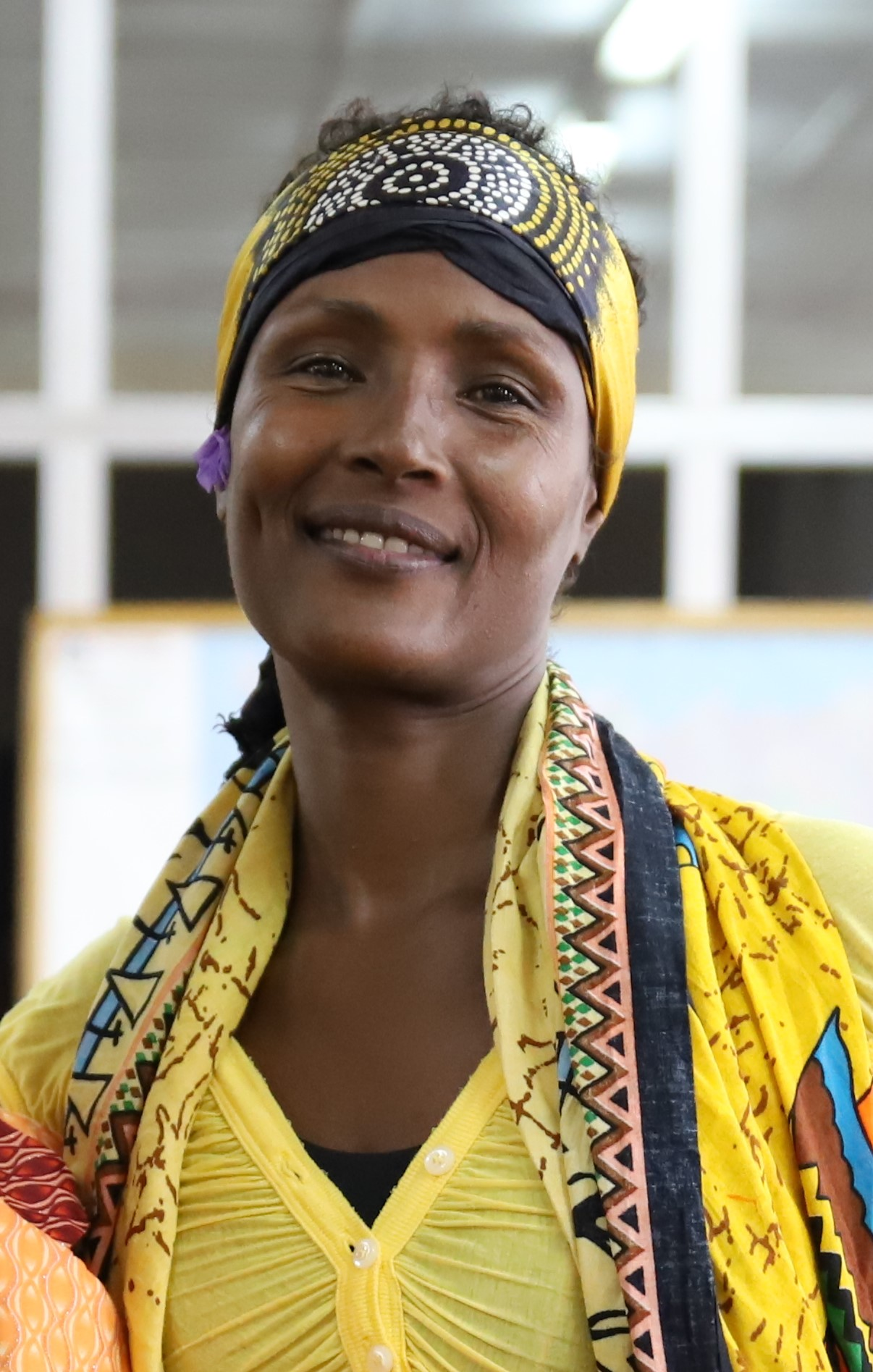
- Dirie in 2018
- Born: 21 October 1965 (age 60); Galkayo, Somalia
- Occupations: Model, social activist, author, actress, UN Special Ambassador and lawyer. (1997–2003)
- Title: Chevalier of the Légion d'honneur
- Children: 2

Waris Dirie (Somali: Waris Diiriye; born 21 October 1965) is a Somali model, author, actress and human rights activist in the fight against female genital mutilation (FGM). From 1997 to 2003, she was a UN special ambassador against FGM. In 2002 she founded her own organization in Vienna, the Desert Flower Foundation. She has won numerous awards recognizing her work on eradicating FGM, including the Chevalier de la Légion d’Honneur (2007).

Born in Somalia, she moved to London where she began her modeling career. She was a model for top brands such as Chanel, Levi's, L'Oréal and Revlon. As a model, Dirie was the first black woman to appear in an Oil of Olay advertisement. In 1987, Dirie played a minor role in the James Bond film The Living Daylights.

In 1997, at the height of her modeling career, Dirie spoke publicly for the first time with the women's magazine Marie Claire about the FGM that she had undergone as a child, and would become a UN special ambassador against FGM that same year. She has created a platform for raising awareness about FGM that includes numerous foundations, campaigns, books, and documentaries. Her first book, Desert Flower (1998), is an autobiography that went on to become an international bestseller, selling over 11 million copies worldwide, and inspired the film Desert Flower (2009). She created two foundations: Desert Flower Foundation, an organisation whose goal is to eradicate female genital mutilation worldwide, and the Desert Dawn Foundation, which raises money for schools and clinics in her native Somalia.

== Early life ==
Dirie was born as one of twelve children into a nomadic family in 1965 in the area of Galkayo. Her first name, Waris, means desert flower.

In her autobiography, Dirie explained how as a four-year-old, she was raped by her cousin. After the rape took place, Dirie underwent an infibulation procedure to remove her labia and suture her vulva, following cultural ideals of purity and shame (ebwaye). Describing the procedure, Dirie said that she was blindfolded but allowed to experience the procedure with her other senses: "It's like somebody is slicing through the meat of your thigh, or cutting off your arm, except this is the most sensitive part of your body". She also described herself fainting and having an out-of-body experience.

At the age of thirteen, she fled through the desert to Mogadishu in order to escape an arranged marriage to a 60-year-old man. She first stayed there with relatives, although her escape was not tolerated.

One of her uncles, who was then the Somali ambassador to the United Kingdom, was looking for a maid. With the help of her aunt, she convinced her uncle to hire her and take her to London, where she worked at her uncle's house for little pay. After her uncle's four-year term, Dirie left and lived in a number of unstable housing arrangements, later renting a room in a YMCA. She earned her living as a cleaner in a local McDonald's. She also began evening classes to learn English.

== Career ==
=== Modeling success ===
Aged 18, Dirie was by chance discovered by photographer Mike Goss, as she stood waiting for her charge outside of his daughter's school. Through getting the children to translate for them, Goss persuaded Dirie to model for him. Afterwards, he helped her get a portfolio together and get her representation, although a lot of modelling agencies claimed there was 'no call for black models'. One of her first modelling jobs was for Terence Donovan, who photographed her in 1987 together with the then still unknown model Naomi Campbell for the title of the Pirelli Calendar. From there, Dirie's modeling career took off, she soon became a successful model, appearing in advertisements for top brands such as Chanel, Levi's, L'Oréal and Revlon.

As a model, Dirie was the first black woman to appear in an Oil of Olay advertisement. She has described the catwalk as her favorite part of modeling, but she has a lesser opinion of the casting process, which she described as "mostly about disappointment". Because of her previous nomadic lifestyle, coupled with the poor nutrition she had at the time, she developed bowed legs. By the time she considered surgery to have them fixed, her bones had set and surgery was not an option. Over time, she incorporated her legs into her identity, coming to see them as an identifier of her nomadic history and of her African heritage. In 1987, Dirie played a minor role in the James Bond film The Living Daylights. She also appeared on the runways of London, Milan, Paris and New York City, and in fashion magazines such as Elle, Glamour and Vogue. This was followed in 1995 by a BBC documentary entitled A Nomad in New York about her modeling career.

=== FGM activism and authorship ===
After experiencing painful menstruation, Dirie sought the advice of several doctors, but she declined to speak about the female genital mutilation that she had endured as a child. She eventually saw a doctor to have her vulva reopened. From that point, she no longer found menstruation or urination painful. She described the change as a "new freedom". In 1997, at the height of her modeling career, Dirie spoke for the first time with Laura Ziv of the women's magazine Marie Claire about the FGM that she had undergone as a child, at the age of five along with her two sisters. That same year, Dirie became a UN envoy for the abolition of FGM. She later paid her mother a visit in her native Somalia. She instructed her mother to intervene if anyone she knew were to undergo FGM, and her mother eventually asked for her forgiveness for subjecting her to the treatment.

In 1998, Dirie coauthored her first book along with nonfiction author Cathleen Miller: Desert Flower, an autobiography that went on to become an international bestseller. Over 11 million copies have been sold worldwide to date, 3 million in Germany alone. She later released other successful books including Desert Dawn, Letter to My Mother and Desert Children, the latter of which was launched in tandem with a European campaign against FGM. Dirie published her second autobiography, Desert Dawn, in 2002, four years after her first. The same year, she founded the Desert Flower Foundation in Vienna. The foundation collects money to raise awareness about the worldwide problem of FGM and to help those affected. In the same year, she received the Corine Literature Prize.

In 2004, she received the World Social Award by Mikhail Gorbachev at the Women's World Award Gala in Hamburg, Germany. Dirie opened the World Conference against FGM in Nairobi, delivered a much-noticed speech, and published for the first time the Waris-Dirie Manifesto against FGM. The Austrian Federal President Heinz Fischer awarded her the Romero Prize on behalf of the Austrian Catholic Men's Movement. In 2006, she addressed the assembled ministers of all EU Member States in Brussels. The European Union then put the fight against female genital mutilation on its agenda, after which laws were tightened up and preventive measures initiated in many European countries. In 2007, the Arab channel Al Jazeera invited Waris Dirie to the popular talk show by Riz Khan. She spoke for the first time on an Arab channel in front of over 100 million viewers about the taboo topic "Female Genital Mutilation".

In 2009, Desert Flower, a feature-length film based on Waris' book Desert Flower was released, with the Ethiopian supermodel Liya Kebede playing her. Directed by Sherry Hormann, the film was produced by Oscar winner Peter Herrmann. Benjamin Herrmann and Waris Dirie were co-producers. The movie has so far been released in 20 countries including France, Spain, Israel, Greece, Poland and Brazil. In January 2010, it won the Bavarian Film Awards in Munich in the "Best Movie" category. It was also nominated for a Film Award in Gold in the "Outstanding Feature Film" category at the German Film Awards, and won the Audience Award in the "Best European Film" category at the San Sebastián International Film Festival.

In 2010, Dirie was appointed Ambassador of Peace and Security in Africa by the African Union.

== Humanitarian work and campaigns ==
Dirie has campaigned extensively to draw attention to female genital mutilation. In 2002 Dirie founded the Desert Flower Foundation in Vienna, an organisation whose goal is to eradicate female genital mutilation worldwide. The Foundation's work is financed by donations. She also started the Desert Dawn Foundation, which raises money for schools and clinics in her native Somalia, and supports the Zeitz Foundation, an organization focused on sustainable development and conservation.

In January 2009 Dirie became a founding member of the PPR Foundation for Women’s Dignity and Rights, an organization of French tycoon François-Henri Pinault (CEO of PPR) and his wife, Hollywood actress Salma Hayek. In 2010, she campaigned with "Stop FGM Now" in collaboration with the Berlin agency Heymann Brandt de Gelmini. This initiative was awarded the prize for "Best NGO Social Media Campaign" by the German Federal Government. "Together for African Women" followed in 2011, a collaboration with the Hamburg agency Jung von Matt and the laundry label Mey.

After the rescue of Desert Flower Safa from FGM in 2014, the sponsorship programme "Save A Little Desert Flower" was launched.

In March 2019 came the much-acclaimed campaign "End FGM" with the British lingerie label Coco de Mer. Dirie posed for the company's collection (as the successor to Pamela Anderson) and was staged by photographer Rankin Rankin also produced the campaign's short film. The initiative was awarded the if Social Impact Prize 2019 by the iF International Forum Design headquartered in Hanover and was supported with prize money. For Dirie the photo shoot with Rankin in London was a comeback as a model.

=== Desert Flower Centers ===
There are a number of Desert Flower centers throughout Europe:

- On 11 September 2013, Dirie as patron opened the world's first holistic medical center for the treatment and care of FGM victims in Berlin together with the Waldfriede Hospital as a cooperation hospital of the Desert Flower Foundation. The Desert Flower Center was awarded the Louise Schroeder Medal by the State of Berlin in 2016.
- In 2014, the Desert Flower Surgical Training Center for surgeons, gynaecologists, urologists and nursing staff was established in Amsterdam together with the Desert Flower Foundation BENELUX.
- The Desert Flower Center Scandinavia was established in 2015 in cooperation with the Karolinska University Hospital in Stockholm.
- In 2017 the Centre Fleur du Desert opened with the Fondation Fleur du Desert in the women's shelter at the Hôpital Delafontaine in Paris Saint-Denis. The Centre Fleur du Desert was visited by French President Emmanuel Macron in December 2017.

=== Education projects in Sierra Leone ===
In 2016 Dirie and the team of the Desert Flower Foundation decided to make the topic "Education in Africa" the focus of their work. Through the sponsorship project "Save A Little Desert Flower" 1,000 girls could be saved from FGM in Sierra Leone. The construction of the first three "Desert Flower schools" in Sierra Leone was announced in early 2019. Diries Desert Flower Foundation is also building a "Safe House", where FGM victims find refuge and protection. There is also a library and a computer centre. In addition, 10,000 copies of Waris Dirie's reading book "My Africa - The Journey" with Desert Flower educational boxes will be distributed to 34 schools in Sierra Leone.

== Awards ==
Dirie has received many prizes and awards for her humanitarian work and books including:

- Woman of the Year Award (1998) by Glamour magazine.
- Corine Award (2002) of the umbrella association of the German bookselling trade.
- Women's World Award (2004) from former President of the USSR, Mikhail Gorbachev.
- Bishop Óscar Romero Award (2005) by the Catholic Church.
- Chevalier de la Légion d’Honneur (2007) from former President of France, Nicolas Sarkozy.
- Prix des Générations (2007) by the World Demographic Association.
- Martin Buber Gold Medal from the Euriade Foundation (2008), founded by Werner Janssen in 1981.
- Gold medal of the President of the Republic of Italy (2010) for her achievements as a human rights activist.
- Thomas Dehler Prize (2013) of the Thomas Dehler Foundation, presented by Sabine Leutheusser-Schnarrenberger
- Woman Of The Year Campaigning Award (2013) in London presented by Sacla
- International Freedom Prize (2014) presented at the House of Lords in London by British Minister Lynne Featherstone
- Women for Women Award (2017), awarded in Vienna by the magazine "look!
- Donna dell'Anno (2018) in Italy
- Million Chances Award (2018) donated by the Fritz Henkel Foundation
- Sunhak Peace Prize (2019) for her commitment to women's rights, awarded in Seoul.

== Personal life ==
Contrary to popular belief, Dirie is not related to fellow Somali model Iman. In her book Desert Flower, Dirie states that Iman's mother was good friends with her aunt, a relative with whom she once lived during her time in London.

Since 2009 Dirie has lived in Gdańsk, Poland. She also lived temporarily in Vienna. She is the mother of two sons, Aleeke and Leon. Since March 2005, Dirie has held Austrian citizenship.

=== Attack and disappearance ===
In March 2004, Dirie was attacked in her home in Vienna. A 26-year-old Portuguese man was held in custody after having apparently stalked her 1,000 miles across Europe, eventually gaining access to her apartment by climbing through a neighbour's window. "She was so frightened and in shock that she let him in," a police spokesman said. Dirie apparently suffered minor injuries when her assailant threw her to the floor. The attacker then left in a taxi, only to return later to smash one of the building's ground-floor windows. He was arrested when neighbours called the police and was later given a five-month suspension. It was reported that the suspect had met Dirie six months earlier when his brother was working at her previous residence in Wales. He later broke into that home and stole items of her clothing.

In another incident in early March 2008, Dirie went missing for three days while staying in Brussels. She was found by a Brussels policeman.

== Filmography, books and a musical ==
=== Films ===
- The Living Daylights (1987) - In the 15th James Bond film, Dirie plays Waris Walsh in a supporting role.
- A Nomad in New York (1995) - BBC documentary about the career of Waris Dirie.
- Desert Flower (2009) - drama based on her autobiographical novel and bestseller.

=== Books ===
- Desert Flower (1998) with Cathleen Miller

The book that describes Dirie's genital mutilation, her adventurous escape through the Somali desert and the rise to a world-famous supermodel, becomes an international bestseller and appears in over 50 licensed editions. Over 11 million copies have been sold worldwide to date, 3 million in Germany alone (number 1 on the Spiegel bestseller list from 11 to 17 January and from 25 January to 18 July 1999).

- Desert Dawn (2002) with Jeanne D’Haem

20 years after her escape, Dirie decides to visit her family in Somalia. A dangerous adventure, as Somalia has been plagued by civil war and famine for years. Her second book, which will also become an international bestseller (first place on the Spiegel bestseller list from 8 to 28 April and from 13 May to 23 June 2002), describes the trip to her home country.

- Desert Children (2005)

With her third book Dirie starts a Europe-wide campaign against FGM. Genital mutilation is not only practiced in Africa, but also in the western world. It reports on encounters with victims and perpetrators, on their research, setbacks and successes.

- Letter to my mother (2007)

Dirie says about this book on the website of the Desert Flower Foundation: "This is my most personal book. There are simply wounds that don't want to heal. My longing was great to meet my mother again, to forgive my mother, but I had to realize that love and suffering are often inextricably linked. Working on this book was a painful but vital experience for me."

- Schwarze Frau, weißes Land (2010)

In this book Dirie talks about her life in her new, white homeland - and about her longing for Africa and her deep desire to help her home continent free itself from poverty, outdated traditions and dependence.

- Saving Safa (2013)

Little Safa comes from a bitterly poor family in Djibouti. Raised in a slum, she is selected for the role of little Waris Dirie in the biopic of the world bestseller Desert Flower. The dramatic scene, in which the little girl is violently circumcised, makes people cry in cinemas all over the world. In real life, Safa is still intact. Dirie is all the more horrified when she hears that Safa's genital mutilation is imminent. And she does everything in her power to save the girl from this cruel practice.

- My Africa - The Journey (2017)

Together with her Desert Flower Foundation team, Dirie publishes her first reading book for children at African schools. The book tells the story of the little "desert flower" Waris and her brother Mo, who go on a journey together to discover their home continent Africa. On their adventures they get to know the flora and fauna of Africa. In addition to the story, the book also contains numerous writing exercises, which are intended to promote the reading and writing skills of children.

=== Musical ===
On 7 March 2019, in the presence of Waris Dirie, it was announced at a press conference at a theatre St. Gallen, Switzerland that her extraordinary life story would become a musical. Written and directed by the German theater and film director Gil Mehmert (converted Sönke Wortmann's film "Das Wunder von Bern" into a musical, 2014). The lyrics are by Frank Ramond, with the music by Uwe Fahrenkrog-Petersen (wrote the music for "99 Luftballons" by Nena). On 22 February 2020 the musical was premiered at the theatre St. Gallen in the presence of Waris Dirie.
