= Father's Day (1996 film) =

German comedy film by Sherry Hormann

- Theatrical release poster
- Directed by: Sherry Hormann
- Written by: Kit Hopkins
- Produced by: Kristen Hager; Eric Moss
- Starring: Herbert Knaup; Corinna Harfouch; Richy Müller; Axel Milberg; Dominik Graf
- Edited by: Norbert Herzner
- Music by: Peter Wolf
- Production companies: Hager Moss Film KG; ProSieben
- Distributed by: Buena Vista International
- Release date: 31 October 1996
- Running time: 96 minutes
- Country: Germany
- Language: German
- Budget: $3.2 million

Father's Day (German: Irren ist männlich, lit. 'To Err is Human') is a 1996 German comedy film directed by Sherry Hormann.

== Plot ==
A philandering husband finds out that he is infertile and is not the father of his children.

== Cast ==
- Herbert Knaup as Thomas
- Corinna Harfouch as Bettina
- Richy Müller as Johannes
- Dominik Graf as Lorenz
- Axel Milberg as Philipp
- Natalia Wörner as Susanne
- Lena May Graf as Gina
- Robert Gwisdek as Leo
- Adele Neuhauser as Schlegel

== Reception ==
The film grossed $3.5 million in its first two weeks of release in Germany.

== American remake ==
In June 1999, Ben Stiller was developing an American remake of the movie to direct at New Line Cinema.
