= Shoppen =

2006 film

- Directed by: Ralf Westhoff
- Starring: Sebastian Weber; Anna Böger
- Distributed by: X Verleih AG (though Warner Bros.)
- Release date: 25 October 2006 (HIFF)
- Running time: 1h 31min
- Country: Germany
- Language: German

Shoppen is a 2006 German comedy film directed by Ralf Westhoff.

== Cast ==
- Sebastian Weber - Jörg
- Anna Böger - Susanne
- Felix Hellmann - Patrick
- Katharina Marie Schubert - Isabella
- David Baalcke - Frank
- Julia Koschitz - Susanna
- Martin Butzke - Markus
- Kathrin von Steinburg - Miriam
- Matthias Bundschuh - Thorsten
