= Desert Flower =

1998 book by Waris Dirie and Cathleen Miller

- Author: Waris Dirie, Cathleen Miller
- Publication date: 1998

Desert Flower: The Extraordinary Journey of a Desert Nomad is an autobiographical book written by Waris Dirie and Cathleen Miller, published in 1998 about the life of Somali model, Waris Dirie.

== Summary ==
Despite suffering female genital mutilation (FGM) at the age of three, and its life-long consequences, Waris Dirie escaped from her native Galkayo, Somalia, fleeing to Mogadishu to escape an arranged marriage. Moving with relatives to London, she worked for a while at a McDonald's and was discovered by chance by fashion photographer Terence Donovan. She continued via modelling in film and fashion to a stage where she was considered a supermodel. It was at this point that, with Miller, she wrote this autobiography. Shortly afterwards she became a UN ambassador for the abolition of FGM.

== Publication ==
- Desert Flower, William Morrow Pub, 1998 (1st edition), ISBN 978-0-688-15823-1

== Film adaptation ==
In 2009, the book was adapted into a film of the same name. Produced by Peter Herrmann and Benjamin Herrmann, the Ethiopian supermodel Liya Kebede plays Waris in the title role.
