= Young Goethe in Love =

- Theatrical release poster
- Directed by: Philipp Stölzl
- Written by: Philipp Stölzl; Alexander Dydyna; Christoph Müller
- Produced by: Christoph Müller; Helge Sasse
- Starring: Alexander Fehling; Miriam Stein; Moritz Bleibtreu
- Cinematography: Kolja Brandt
- Edited by: Sven Budelmann
- Music by: Ingo L. Frenzel
- Production companies: SevenPictures Film Senator; Senator Film Produktion; Warner Bros. Film Productions Germany; Deutschfilm; Erfttal Film; Goldkind Filmproduktion; herbX Film; Magnolia Filmproduktion; Summerstorm Entertainment; CC Medien
- Distributed by: Warner Bros. Pictures
- Release date: 14 October 2010 (Germany)
- Running time: 102 minutes
- Country: Germany
- Language: German
- Budget: €3 million
- Box office: $5.827 million

Young Goethe in Love (originally titled Goethe!) is a 2010 German historical drama film directed by Philipp Stölzl and starring Alexander Fehling, Miriam Stein, and Moritz Bleibtreu. It is a fictionalized version of the early years of the poet Johann Wolfgang von Goethe and the events forming the basis of his novel The Sorrows of Young Werther.

== Plot ==
At the University of Strasbourg in 1772, young Johann Wolfgang Goethe fails his doctoral examination in law and, despite wishing to be a poet, is sent by his father to work in the Reichskammergericht, the imperial law court in the small town of Wetzlar. Set to read old files by his grim chief Kestner, he is befriended by another junior, Wilhelm Jerusalem, who takes him to a dance.

There he sees Lotte Buff, the daughter of a widower living in an old manor house outside the town, where she looks after her seven younger siblings. Developing a closer friendship with the attractive and lively young woman, he one day encounters her on a country road. A sudden rainstorm forces the two to seek shelter in a ruined castle, where they make love.

Meanwhile, Kestner has been negotiating with her father, who is delighted to see his impoverished family helped by the marriage of his eldest girl to a distinguished lawyer. Though not the least charmed by Kestner, for the sake of the family, Lotte reluctantly agrees he may marry her. Unaware of her relationship with Goethe and without mentioning her name, Kestner asks him to be best man. Goethe agrees heartily and even suggests some good phrases that he could use in his wedding.

Accepting Kestner out of duty, Lotte writes to Goethe to tell him their affair is at an end. Before he gets the letter, he sets out for her house with a present, only to find her engagement party in full swing. Returning despondent to his lodgings, he then sees his roommate Jerusalem shoot himself in despair over his hopeless love for a married woman. After briefly contemplating suicide himself, he returns to work and publicly insults Kestner, who demands a duel. Given the first shot, he misses, and Kestner fires wide and has him arrested for illegal dueling.

In jail, Goethe turns these events into a story he calls The Sorrows of Young Werther and sends the manuscript to Lotte as a farewell gift. She sees its qualities and, without telling him, takes it to a publisher. Once Goethe is released from prison, his father takes him home to Frankfurt, where the book has become a sensation and the young author a celebrity.

== Cast ==
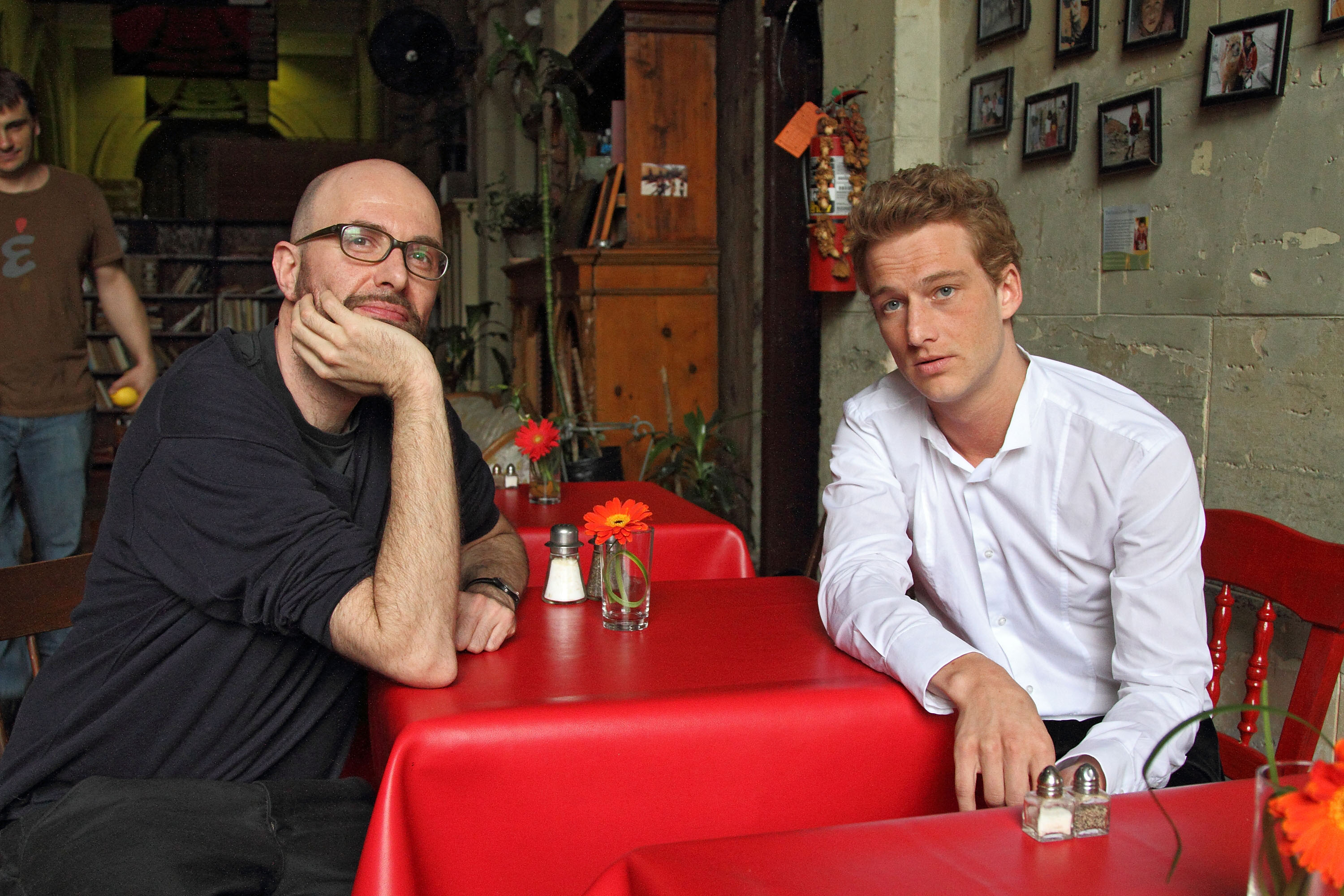
Director Philipp Stölzl & actor Alexander Fehling at the 2011 Miami International Film Festival showing of Young Goethe in Love

- Alexander Fehling as Johann Wolfgang Goethe
- Miriam Stein as Charlotte Buff
- Moritz Bleibtreu as Johann Christian Kestner
- Volker Bruch as Karl Wilhelm Jerusalem
- Burghart Klaußner as Heinrich Adam Buff, Lotte's father
- Henry Hübchen as Johann Caspar Goethe, Goethe's father
- Hans-Michael Rehberg as judge Kammermeier

== Historical accuracy ==
Some of the film is an accurate biography, some is drawn from the novel, and some is fictional. Though Goethe did not receive a doctorate, he earned a licentiate, which entitled him to practice, so he was not a failure at his legal studies. His relationship with Lotte was never more than platonic. He did not fight a duel with Kestner and so was not jailed for it. On the contrary, Goethe had great respect for Kestner.

== Reception ==
On review aggregator website Rotten Tomatoes, the film has an approval rating of 64% based on 36 reviews, with an average score of 6.2/10. On Metacritic, Young Goethe in Love holds a rank of 55 out of a 100 based on 18 critics, indicating "mixed or average reviews".

Many critics were not impressed with the film. Peter Rainer of The Christian Science Monitor gave the film one and a half star out of five, writing "Turns one of the greatest geniuses of German literature into a love-struck rapscallion".

David Fear of Time Out called the film "[an] irrelevant biopic", while Kevin Thomas of the Los Angeles Times said that "It drowns in swoony clichés".

Writing for The New York Times A. O. Scott commented "Mr. Fehling, tumbling from puppy dog eagerness into weepy, inky self-pity, never quite rises to the requirements of the role, which may be hopelessly incoherent in any case".

On the contrary, Michael Phillips of the Chicago Tribune, said that "You needn't know a thing about Goethe or his works to enjoy the picture". NPR's Jeannette Catsoulis also responded with positive criticism, she wrote "Charming in a way that American romantic comedies have all but forgotten, Young Goethe in Love is by turns cute, campy and endearingly cliched".

According to John DeFore of The Hollywood Reporter, "Highbrow pedigree is mostly window dressing for a commercial period romance about Germany's literary giant".
