= Katja Frenzel =

German actress

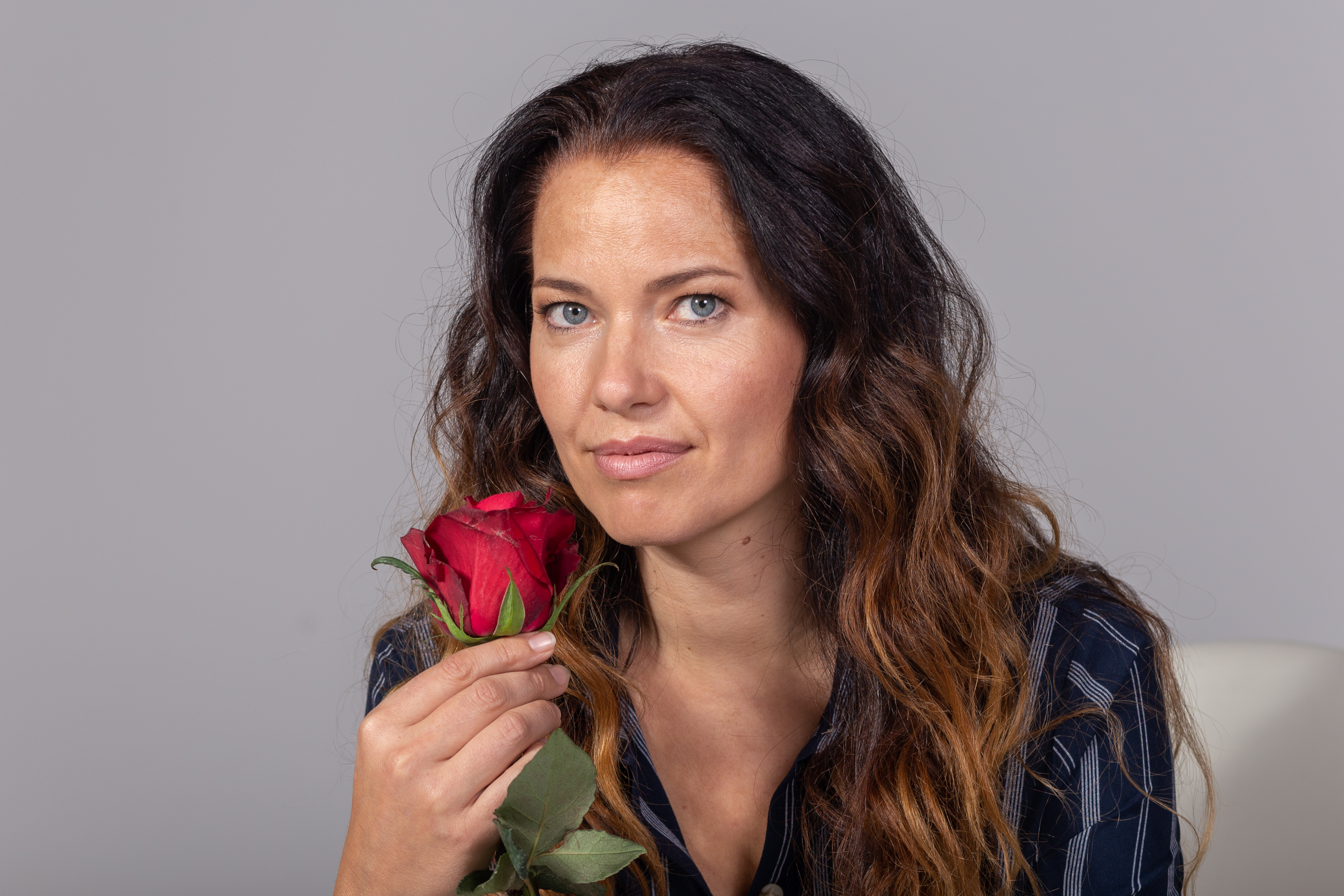
- Frenzel in 2019
- Born: 17 May 1974 (age 50); Dessau, East Germany (now Dessau-Roßlau, Germany)
- Occupation: Actress
- Children: 4

Katja Frenzel (born 17 May 1974), also called Katja Frenzel-Röhl, is a German actress.

== Career ==
Frenzel began her acting career in 1994 on the ZDF series Frauenarzt Dr. Markus Merthin. She was only supposed to play an episode role there, but was then included in the permanent cast of the first season. Immediately afterwards, she was cast in the soap opera Unter Uns, where she portrayed Melanie Hoffmeister in episodes 8 to 229 from the end of 1994 to 1995. She then worked as an actress in various TV films and series, including in the ZDF series Küstenwache, Alarm für Cobra 11, Familie Dr. Kleist, and SOKO Wismar.

In 2016 and 2018-19, Frenzel portrayed the role of Tina Richter in the telenovela Rote Rosen. In addition to acting, she is also a comedian, including the sketch-comedy series Zack! Comedy nach Maß, and has also worked as an acting coach for children and young people since 2003.

== Personal life ==
In addition to Standard German, due to Frenzel's biographical constellations, she can also speak the Berlin, Colognian, North German and Upper Saxon dialects fluently.

Frenzel is the daughter of actress Bärbel Röhl, the sister of actress and children's book illustrator Anna Frenzel-Röhl and the cousin of actress Henriette Richter-Röhl. She has three sons and a daughter and lives in Berlin.
