= Treasure Guards =

2011 German adventure television film

- Directed by: Iain B. MacDonald
- Screenplay by: Richard Kurti; Bev Doyle
- Produced by: Moritz Polter
- Starring: Anna Friel; Raoul Bova; Volker Bruch; Florentine Lahme; Patrick Lyster; Andre Jacobs; David Sherwood
- Cinematography: Trevor Michael Brown
- Edited by: Steve Singleton
- Music by: Michael Richard Plowman
- Production company: Tandem Communications
- Release date: 2011
- Running time: 90 minutes
- Country: Germany
- Language: English

Treasure Guards (also known as German: Treasure Guards - Das Vermächtnis des Salomon (Treasure Guards – The Legacy of Solomon)) is a 2011 German action adventure television film directed by Iain B. MacDonald.

== Plot ==
Angelo was once part of the Pope's personal security guard, but fell in love with a woman who later turned out to be a conspirator and attempted assassin. Due to his personal failure, he leaves the guard, becomes a priest, and joins the Keepers of the Treasury, a church organisation responsible for recovering valuable relics. Angelo is entrusted with the mission of recovering King Solomon's ring. This leads to the location of a diamond mine.

Young, aspiring archaeologist at the University of Oxford, Dr Victoria Carter, has yet to establish her reputation within the scientific establishment and must therefore fight hard for funding for an excavation. One day she discovers clues to the possible location of King Solomon's seal. Therefore, she accompanies Angelo as scientific support. Before embarking on the mission, Victoria turns to her father, Teddy Carter, a respected Oxford professor and a great expert on King Solomon, to decipher a manuscript that has come into her possession. The two have had a difficult relationship for several years since her mother's death. Later, she finds neither her father nor the manuscript in the office, but keeps it secret from Angelo.

On their journey into the Jordanian desert, they are joined by Luca, Angelo's half-brother, a young man with constant money problems, who hopes to be relieved of these worries by the success of their mission. Angelo and Victoria have a disagreement: Victoria is an atheist and wants to follow her scientific approach, while the very religious Angelo wants to obtain the talisman for the church. The small group find what they are looking for in an ancient temple ruin. However, during a cloak-and-dagger operation, the treasure is stolen, leading to a chase with an ominous group of criminals.

== Cast ==
- Anna Friel as Dr Victoria Carter
- Raoul Bova as Angelo
- Volker Bruch as Luca
- Florentine Lahme as Nina Trent
- Patrick Lyster as Marcello
- Andre Jacobs as Professor Teddy Carter
- David Sherwood as Professor Elgar

== Background ==
The film was shot primarily in South Africa, particularly in Cape Town. Some scenes were filmed in Rome and Oxford. Principal photography took place from 20 November 2010 to 18 December 2010.

== Reception ==
Filmdienst described the film as "A trivial, naive (television) adventure film shot in South Africa, in which a supposed biblical legend is brought to life."

Lei Chic said "The film is halfway between adventure and mystery" and "The location of the film is magnificent".

Cinetrend concluded "Treasure Guards: The Legacy of Solomon" was certainly a complex production for a TV series, but it does give the impression that the film was skimped on in terms of character development and story. The result is a reasonably solid, yet very predictable TV show – now also available on DVD."
