= Generation War =

German World War II TV miniseries

- Promotional English language poster
- Unsere Mütter, unsere Väter
- Written by: Stefan Kolditz
- Directed by: Philipp Kadelbach
- Starring: Volker Bruch; Tom Schilling; Katharina Schüttler; Miriam Stein; Ludwig Trepte
- Theme music composer: Fabian Römer
- Country of origin: Germany
- Original languages: German, Polish, Russian
- No. of episodes: 3

Production
- Producers: Benjamin Benedict; Nico Hofmann; Jürgen Schuster
- Cinematography: David Slama
- Editor: Bernd Schlegel
- Running time: 90 minutes per episode
- Production company: TeamWorx

Original release
- Network: ZDF
- Release: 17 March – 20 March 2013

Generation War (German: Unsere Mütter, unsere Väter, translated as "Our Mothers, our Fathers") is a 2013 German World War II TV miniseries in three parts. It was commissioned by the public broadcasting organization ZDF, produced by the UFA subsidiary TeamWorx, and first aired in Germany and Austria in March 2013. The series tells the story of five German friends, aged around 20, on different paths through Nazi Germany and World War II: as Wehrmacht soldiers on the Eastern Front, a war nurse, an aspiring singer, and a Jewish tailor. The narrative spans four years, starting in 1941 Berlin, when the friends meet up for a last time before embarking on their journeys, enthusiastically vowing to meet up again the following Christmas. The story's conclusion is set shortly after the end of the war in 1945.

When the series was first aired in Germany, each episode garnered around 7 million views. Generation War has generated much controversy. The Economist stated that hardly any German TV drama ever caused so much public debate. Critics have acknowledged the series to be well crafted, intense and unsparing in its depiction of combat on the eastern front. However, aspects such as the portrayal of the Polish resistance movement as anti-semites, the scant depiction of Nazi Germany's objective to purge the Reich of Jews, and the blurring of differences between non-German victims and German perpetrators have been deplored by others.

== Plot ==
There are three 90-minute parts: A Different Time (Eine andere Zeit), A Different War (Ein anderer Krieg), and A Different Country (Ein anderes Land).

=== A Different Time ===
Shortly before the German invasion of the Soviet Union, five close friends have a party at a pub in Berlin. Wilhelm is an officer in the Army, while his brother Friedhelm an enlisted man. Viktor is a Jew whose father owns a tailor shop. Charlotte has just passed her examination to become a military nurse. Greta is a beautiful bartender who hopes to become a singer. The friends are hopeful that they will meet again by Christmas.

Wilhelm and Friedhelm witness some early victories as the German army advances toward Moscow. Charlotte gets used to seeing blood as she works in a military hospital near the front line. Greta sleeps with an SS-SD major in order to advance her career as a singer. She attempts to use her relationship to obtain documents for Viktor to flee to New York City, but Viktor is arrested by the Gestapo and is put on a train to a concentration camp.

=== A Different War ===
The invasion is being pushed back by the Red Army, causing high casualties for the Germans. During an assault in which almost his entire platoon is killed, Wilhelm is knocked unconscious by an explosion and left for dead. When he wakes up, instead of going back to the base, he finds a cabin by a lake and lives on his own for a few weeks. He is discovered by the military police and sentenced to death for desertion. Friedhelm, having been cut off from his unit during the earlier assault, escapes the Soviets by wearing a Soviet uniform, only to be mistakenly shot by his own side when returning to his lines. He is taken to a field hospital where Charlotte discovers him and convinces the doctor to operate, saving his life. While recovering, believing his brother to be dead, he tells Charlotte that Wilhelm has been killed. Friedhelm is sent back home, but seeing his father's disappointment with Wilhelm's apparent death, and lack of appreciation for Friedhelm's survival, Friedhelm cuts short his leave and returns to his unit. Viktor is sent to Auschwitz, but he manages to escape by breaking the wooden floor of the railroad car he is in, alongside a Polish woman called Alina, and joins a group of Polish partisans. He has to conceal his Jewish identity because they hate Jews. Charlotte feels despair over Wilhelm's apparent death and starts an affair with the doctor who saved Friedhelm. Greta visits the front line to perform for the many soldiers. In the apartment where she stays, she is reunited with Wilhelm, Friedhelm and Charlotte for a brief moment. She visits Charlotte's workplace and becomes disillusioned by what she sees. Back in Germany, she returns to the bar where she works and tells the soldiers who have returned from the battlefield that victory is still a long way to go. The day after, she is arrested by the Gestapo and thrown into prison for making remarks in public that disapprove of the war and the Hitler regime and also probably because of her attempts to contact the same Gestapo Lt. Colonel in the first episode (calling him at home, which, as his mistress, was unacceptable). When the Lt. Colonel questions her, she tells him that she has become pregnant.

=== A Different Country ===
The Soviets are now nearing Berlin. Wilhelm's death sentence is reduced to probation and he is assigned to a disciplinary battalion. A sadistic sergeant abuses Wilhelm, whom he eventually kills before escaping the battalion. Charlotte befriends a Russian nurse named Sonja. After liberating prisoners from a train on the way to a labour camp, Viktor is expelled from the partisans because they find out he is Jewish. Charlotte sees Wilhelm again and has an emotional breakdown because she thought he was dead. Viktor crosses paths with Friedhelm, who kills an SD commander, enabling Viktor to escape. When the field hospital is overrun, Sonja and Charlotte are captured and Charlotte is nearly raped by a Soviet soldier. Lilija, Charlotte's former assistant arrested by the Gestapo for being Jewish, is revealed to have survived and is now serving as a Soviet officer. She sees Sonja being harassed as a traitor by Soviet soldiers and then being executed by Lilija. After the German army falls apart, Friedhelm dies while leading a group of Volkssturm, sacrificing himself to make his troops surrender. In the war's last days, Greta is executed by the German authorities for her speech crimes and her possession of incriminating evidence about her former Gestapo lover—who, it is implied, has ordered her execution. Shortly after the end of the war, the three survivors, Wilhelm, Viktor and Charlotte, meet in the ruins of the same pub as before and grieve for their lost friends, without any sense of triumph over their survival.

== Main characters ==
=== Wilhelm Winter ===
Wilhelm (Volker Bruch) is the narrator of the story. He provides the opening monologue for the episodes, and when the plot jumps forward in time his voiceovers describe the course of the war. In the pilot episode he states that he has served in the invasion of Poland as well as in the invasion of France. He is somewhat aware that Charlotte has feelings for him, but tells his brother and fellow soldiers that he doesn't want to get her hopes up, presumably as he could be killed on the front lines before he could reciprocate.

Wilhelm firmly believes he is bound by honor to fight as a soldier for his home country. Consequently, he is determined to do what he considers his duty as a Wehrmacht officer commanding an infantry platoon and he executes a prisoner in accordance with the Commissar Order. As the war goes on he is awarded the Iron Cross 1st class and promoted to Oberleutnant but the hope for a quick victory evaporates and so does his naïve idealism. Facing the death of his whole platoon to achieve a questionable objective, he walks away from the front line after suffering from a concussion caused by a Panzerfaust anti-tank explosive. He then takes refuge in an abandoned lakeside cabin where he is arrested as a deserter by Feldgendarmerie officers. Instead of being executed, he is placed in a Strafbattalion (Penal Battalion). He is continually broken down further, through the actions of his sadistic platoon leader. Charlotte encounters him as a member of the Penal Battalion and is incredulous that he is alive, but they are quickly separated. Later he kills his platoon leader and escapes with a fellow soldier, making his way to Berlin.

At the series' end, he, Charlotte, and Viktor gather in the rubble of the bar where Greta worked in occupied Berlin and toast Greta and Friedhelm.

=== Charlotte ===
Charlotte (Miriam Stein), referred to as "Charly" by the circle of friends, secretly loves Wilhelm. When the war begins she volunteers as a nurse. She initially cannot bear to witness the suffering of wounded soldiers, but over the course of the campaign she hardens considerably. After being expelled from the operating theatre for dropping a scalpel, she is reassigned as a general nurse. Because the medical staff are overworked and in short supply, she is allowed to get assistance from local Ukrainian medical workers. She employs a Ukrainian assistant named Lilija who, when asked, denies being a Jew. After morphine goes missing, Charlotte investigates and discovers a photograph of Lilija's family standing in front of a menorah. She confronts Lilija, who admits to being a Jewish born medical doctor. Upon hearing this admission, Charlotte wrestles with her conscience but in the end decides to report her to the authorities. However, shortly afterwards, when she sees Gestapo officers approaching the ward she tries to warn Lilija to run away. But before Lilija can act, another German nurse points her out to the authorities who are "looking for a Jew hiding in the hospital" and they take her away. Charlotte's grief is further compounded when a wounded Friedhelm claims that Wilhelm was killed in action and she has an affair with the chief surgeon. Things only get worse when Wilhelm later turns up as a Penal Battalion soldier at her field hospital as the German Army is retreating on the Eastern Front. She angrily pushes Wilhelm away after confessing she is in love with him, and runs away to cry. When she regains her composure to try and speak with him again, she finds that he is gone.

As the front very quickly closes in, Charlotte, a local aide, Sonja, and a group of seriously wounded soldiers fail to evacuate and are left behind to face the advancing Red Army, whose men kill the rest of the wounded soldiers in their beds and proceed to arrest Sonja as a collaborator and attempt to rape Charlotte. Just then Lilija, having been freed by the Soviets and now in their service as an officer, shows up, saves Charlotte from rape and from further harm (execution) by arranging her inclusion as a nurse in the Soviet field hospital. She does however proceed to shoot Sonja, stating there was nothing she could do to alter a death penalty for a collaborator, noting that she has at least saved her from suffering sexual abuse at the hand of the soldiers.

At the war's end, she, Wilhelm, and Viktor have a solemn reunion in the rubble of the bar where Greta worked.

=== Greta Müller ===
Greta (Katharina Schüttler) is a bartender at a local tavern in Berlin, and an ambitious singer who wants to succeed by any means. When the Gestapo officer Martin Dorn crashes their going-away party (in the pilot episode), she admits to possessing the Teddy Stauffer swing-dance record the five friends are dancing to in order to stall the officer and prevents her Jewish boyfriend Viktor from being discovered out past curfew. She starts a love affair with Dorn to try to worm out of the charges of incitement; Dorn, in return, promotes her career for propaganda efforts. When she becomes a threat to his own marriage, he organizes a USO-like road show in the midst of the Eastern Front. She is briefly reunited with Friedhelm, Wilhelm, and Charlotte in her improvised dressing room after her performance, but cuts short the reunion (much to the other friends' dismay) to attend a private party held by the senior commanders.

Greta is stranded when her driver and pilot leave her behind at the start of the Battle of Kursk as she takes too long to pack her belongings. Charlotte forces her to help tend to wounded Heer soldiers at her field hospital, and the experience clearly traumatizes Greta. By chance she manages to return to her bar in Berlin, where she openly expresses her doubts in the Endsieg to a group of partying soldiers, and angers Dorn by revealing their affair to his wife, both of which lead to her getting arrested and imprisoned for Wehrkraftzersetzung ("subversion of the war effort") and defeatism. When she is arrested, she reveals that she had become impregnated by Dorn. He is shocked by this and then punches her in the stomach hard, to end her pregnancy. She is imprisoned and eventually executed by a firing squad in the final days of the war.

=== Viktor Goldstein ===
Viktor (Ludwig Trepte) is Greta's secret lover. Because of his Jewish background both of them live in constant fear that they will be accused of Rassenschande ("racial shame", "racial defilement", or "racial pollution"). Attempting to help him escape deportation, Greta manipulates Dorn into giving him a passport to the US, but Dorn double-crosses him and on the day of his departure Viktor is arrested by Gestapo and sent to a concentration camp. On the way there he escapes from the train, along with a Polish woman named Alina, and joins a group of Polish Armia Krajowa partisans. During his time there he has to keep his Jewish background a secret due to widespread anti-Semitism within the group. As the group is about to carry out an ambush on a motorized Wehrmacht squad, Viktor, by chance, recognizes Friedhelm as one of the drivers, and feigns his participation in the attack allowing Friedhelm to pass safely through the ambush and inadvertently saving the life of Hiemer, his SD officer passenger. Later, the group ambushes and raids a German train for weapons, whereupon they discover that a large part of its cargo is Jewish prisoners, whom they refuse to free. A conflicted Viktor decides openly to defy them and frees the prisoners, angering the other partisans who consider executing him. However, their leader, having become sympathetic towards Viktor, allows him to walk away from the group in peace. Just after Viktor leaves, the partisans are betrayed and their hide-out is attacked by Friedhelm's squad, but Friedhelm recognizes Viktor and allows him to escape amidst the confusion, having shot SD officer Hiemer who has also appeared. After the end of the war Viktor returns to Berlin to find out that both his parents and Greta are dead, that new residents have taken over his family's apartment, and that Dorn is now a member of the allies' postwar administration under the protection of U.S. army, much to his fury. At the end of the war Viktor reunites with Charlotte and Wilhelm in the rubble of the bar where Greta worked.

=== Friedhelm Winter ===
Friedhelm Winter, played by Tom Schilling

Friedhelm (Tom Schilling) is a sensitive young man who has no ambitions as a soldier. His comrades deride him as a foolhardy coward who puts their lives at greater risk and they beat him up after it is perceived he gave away their position to a Polikarpov Po-2 "sewing machine" by lighting a cigarette. Friedhelm becomes emotionally hardened and ruthless throughout the Eastern front campaign, willingly executing prisoners, and leading a charge to take a Russian telegraph station after witnessing his brother's apparent death by a Panzerfaust. He is shot by his fellow soldiers when they mistake him for a Russian (when he had stolen a Russian uniform to escape from aforementioned telegraph station upon its recapture by the Red Army). Charlotte manages to save him by begging the chief surgeon of the field hospital to operate on him, despite the surgeon's bleak triage assessment. Before being sent back to Berlin he tells Charlotte (mistakenly) that Wilhelm perished in the Panzerfaust attack. He becomes a protégé of SD officer Hiemer, who uses him as an executioner during the numerous anti-partisan actions in occupied Poland. But during a raid on a Polish partisan group, Friedhelm has a chance encounter with Viktor, and when Hiemer orders him to shoot Viktor, Friedhelm instead betrays and kills Hiemer, allowing Viktor to escape. Near the end of the war he has been promoted to the rank of Unteroffizier (equivalent to UK Corporal / US Sergeant) and leads a group of Volkssturm soldiers comprising old men and Hitler Youth boys shaped by their stubborn will to fight against the Soviets. Being an Eastern Front veteran, Friedhelm's presence was enough to motivate the Volkssturm Youth to fight towards their propagandized and hopeless Final Victory. Over the course of the war, Friedhelm transforms from a sensitive, anti-war intellectual into a hardened, ruthless soldier who carries out war crimes. Completely burned out and disgusted by the monster he has become, he sees no place for himself in a post-war world. Realizing the war has fundamentally changed him, Friedhelm orders them to stay put and walks alone towards the enemy aiming his rifle at them but not shooting, causing himself to be gunned down. The Volkssturm soldiers surrender after witnessing Friedhelm's not so futile death by fire from a Maxim machine gun.

== Main cast ==
- Volker Bruch: Wilhelm Winter
- Tom Schilling: Friedhelm Winter
- Katharina Schüttler: Greta Müller
- Ludwig Trepte: Viktor Goldstein
- Miriam Stein: Charlotte
- Mark Waschke: Dorn
- Christiane Paul: Lilija
- Sylvester Groth: Sturmbannführer / Standartenführer Hiemer
- Henriette Richter-Röhl: Hildegard
- Götz Schubert: Dr. Jahn
- Bernd Michael Lade: Oberfeldwebel Krebs
- Maxim Mehmet: Hauptmann Feigl
- Alina Levshin: Alina, a Pole from Warsaw
- Samuel Finzi: Viktor's father
- Dorka Gryllus: Viktor's mother
- Johanna Gastdorf: Mother Winter
- Peter Kremer: Father Winter
- Anne Diemer: Dorn's wife
- Trystan Pütter: Bertok
- David Zimmerschied: Schneider
- Joel Basman: Bartel
- Antonio Wannek: Koch
- Lucas Gregorowicz: Jerzy (Polish partisan leader)
- Benjamin Trinks: Eins
- Michael Ihnow: Francizek
- Ludwig Blochberger: Freitag
- Hildegard Schroedter: German head nurse
- Tino Mewes: Zwei
- Marek Harloff: Karow
- Jean Denis Römer: Russian officer in the hospital
- Martin Hentschel: the officer who commits suicide
- David Zimmerschied: Schneider
- Laurens Walter: Dorn's Adjutant
- Kristoffer Fuss: Russian soldier
- Jan Niklas Berg: German soldier
- Matthias Halbrock: Russian doctor
- Adam Markiewicz: Stanislawski
- Martin Bruchmann: Schmidt
- Andre Borning: Russian officer
- Bruno Montani: soldier
- Inga Jarkova: Sonja, Russian nurse
- Bernhard Conrad: Feldwebel
- Franziska Böhm: Krystyna
- Florian Andreas Rittweger: German traitor
- Kristina Skokova : Jewish woman
- Juozas Aleknavičius : German soldier

== Production ==
Generation War is an UFA production, formally known as TeamWorx. It was filmed in sound stages and backlots at Studio Babelsberg in Potsdam and on location in Germany and Lithuania as well as in Latvia.

Originally, Viktor was to escape to France and finally to return as a regular soldier with the US Army. This part of the script was changed to a solution which could be produced on already-available locations.

== International sales ==
RTÉ bought the Irish rights and began its broadcast on Sunday 17 November 2013 in the prime-time slot of 9pm on their more youth-focused station RTÉ Two. The show was broadcast with English subtitles.

The Australian broadcaster SBS showed the series on three consecutive Sunday nights at 8.30pm on SBS One starting on Sunday 12 January 2014 using their own subtitles. A 2 disc DVD set was released in Australia on 12 February 2014.

The BBC acquired the UK rights and showed the series subtitled on BBC Two over three weeks starting on Saturday 26 April 2014. It is the first foreign language programme on BBC Two since the second series of Lars von Trier's The Kingdom in 2001. Sue Deeks, the BBC's head of programme acquisition, has stated that the series has "a truly epic sweep and emotionally compelling narrative".

The US distribution company Music Box has picked up the US rights and hopes to give the series a theatrical release before releasing it for TV and DVD.

Italian state broadcaster RAI showed the series divided into two parts on the Rai 3 channel over two consecutive evenings on 7 and 8 February 2014. Audience figures were 1,431,000 (5.36% share) on the first night with a slightly higher figure on the second night (1,548,000 / 6.2%).

When shown by Swedish public broadcaster SVT in late May 2013, it received very high viewing figures, the highest ever for a non-English language import. When aired in Poland, the series scored record ratings, in spite of the Polish criticism.

Flemish public broadcaster VRT aired the series in six parts on Canvas starting Tuesday 4 February 2014 both in standard and high definition.

Croatian public broadcaster HRT aired the series in six parts beginning Thursday 13 February 2014.

Danish public broadcaster DR aired the series over two consecutive evenings beginning 9 May 2015. It was aired on its culture channel DR K.

Portuguese public broadcaster RTP aired the series in six parts beginning Monday 14 August 2017.

== Reception ==
The series has received a 60% "fresh" rating on the popular critical aggregate website Rotten Tomatoes signifying mixed reviews.

=== Reception in Germany ===
When the series aired in Germany in March 2013, each episode had some 7 million viewers.

The series was awarded the Deutscher Fernsehpreis 2013 (German Television Award) for the best multi-part television film of 2013.

The Frankfurter Allgemeine Zeitung wrote that the film would give the remaining survivors of the World War II generation an opportunity to discuss it with their families. The film had introduced a new phase in historical films on the Nazi era according to the paper.

The historian Norbert Frei praised the film for showing, for the first time on German television, an unvarnished portrait of Germany's war against the Soviet Union, including the participation of the Wehrmacht in murdering Jews, the shooting of hostages as reprisals against partisan resistance, and the looting of homes vacated by Jews. He wrote that the film did not present idealized one-dimensional figures, but people of broken character who become aware of their shared guilt.

The film underwent a thorough historical analysis in the book "Der totgeglaubte Held als TV-Event - Eine Studie zum gegenwärtigen Heldenbild in der Trilogie „Unsere Mütter, unsere Väter" (2013) by Julia Meyer. The author stressed the danger of the docu-entertainment format of movies that attempt to depict historical events with stories that are in fact purely fictional. Meyer emphasized how crucial the creation of the friends‘ characters in the trilogy was for the perception of the historical content, and criticized the movie's denial of the Holocaust through the creation of a Jewish protagonist who survived the war through switching sides and becoming a traitor to his heroic and self-sacrificing friends.

Several German historians criticized the film. The historian Ulrich Herbert wrote that the film showed Nazis as "others", different from "Our Mothers and Fathers". It showed all Germans as victims. The film showed nothing of the love and trust that Hitler inspired in German youth, or of the widespread belief that Germany deserved to rule Europe. In reality, he wrote, these "mothers and fathers" were a highly ideological and politicized generation, who wanted Nazi Germany to win victory, because that would be right.

The historian Habbo Knoch said that the film failed to show how the Nazi system functioned. The film showed 20-year-old characters who became victims of war but missing were the 30- to 40-year-old Germans who built the Nazi system and supported it out of a mixture of conviction and self-interest. The film should have shown those who profited from the Nazi system.

According to historian Lukas Meissel, "Historical guilt is often talked about or portrayed in a somewhat elusive way, making it easy to relativize." Three stereotypes are advanced to downplay Nazi German crimes: "1. The Poles are shown as even more anti-Semitic than the Germans. Furthermore, they are presented as convinced ideological anti-Semites, whereas the German characters are portrayed mostly as not ideological. 2. Soviet soldiers are presented in a primarily negative light. ... 3. The Americans (and not the Germans) use 'former' Nazis to pursue their own interests..."

A critic in the Kölner Stadt-Anzeiger called the film kitschy, devoid of deeper meaning, and morally worst, full of pathetic self-pity. The film's message was "We perpetrators (of war crimes) didn't have an easy time."

In the German Jewish weekly Jüdische Allgemeine, Jennifer Nathalie Pyka wrote that the achievement of the producers of Generation War lay in producing a film about World War II in which the troublesome question of how six million Jews were killed had been simply blanked out and omitted. The film provided an epiphany for those who had always known that not only Jews were Hitler's victims, but more important – all Germans were Hitler's victims.

=== Reception in Poland ===
Many Polish viewers were outraged at the depiction of Poles as anti-semites. Tygodnik Powszechny described the film as "falsification of history". The paper said that the production depicted all Poles as fanatical anti-semites, even more so than the Germans who are shown as "basically good people" misled by the Nazis. Critics stated that the screenwriters sought to slander the Polish anti-Nazi resistance underground army Armia Krajowa, which is shown in the film as rabidly anti-semitic. In fact, the Armia Krajowa had a branch called Żegota devoted to the rescue of Jews from the Holocaust in Poland carried out by the Germans. The Polish ambassador in Austria, Jerzy Marganski, and the Polish embassy in Germany sent a letter of complaint to the German broadcaster ZDF pointing out that the Armia Krajowa had Jewish members, and that Poles constituted one-quarter of the Righteous Among the Nations honored at Yad Vashem. The broadcaster issued a statement that it was regrettable that the role of Polish characters had been interpreted as unfair and hurtful: "The deeds and responsibility of the Germans should in no way be relativized."

Poland's largest daily newspaper Gazeta Wyborcza published a review under the title "Who can explain to the Germans that the Armia Krajowa was not the SS?" The critic said the movie was the newest of a genre of German poor-quality historical films seeking sympathy for Nazi Germany. Their recipe, he wrote, "tastes like a western movie, but in the background waves a flag with a swastika."

The Polish ambassador to the US, Ryszard Schnepf, sent a written complaint to Music Box, who had bought the US rights to the series. He was supported by the director of the Polish state organisation the Institute of National Remembrance, Łukasz Kamiński, who said he feared that people who were unfamiliar with European history may be led to believe that Armia Krajowa members were all antisemitic. Plans to broadcast the series in the UK led to a demonstration by Polish activists in London.

The Polish ambassador to the UK, Witold Sobków, criticized the movie in The Huffington Post.

=== Comments in the UK and US ===
Commenting on its success in Germany, The Economist wrote that some German critics suggested that "putting five sympathetic young protagonists into a harrowing story just offers the war generation a fresh bunch of excuses." The Daily Telegraph wrote that Generation War "has been hailed by critics as a 'turning point' in German television for examining the crimes of the Third Reich at an individual level," and that it, "explores the seductive aspect of Nazism."

Jackson Janes, president of the American Institute for Contemporary German Studies at the Johns Hopkins University, commented that the series "does not filter the Nazi atrocities nor the reality of war. Instead, it tries to portray how the millions of people who followed Hitler into the catastrophe he created were attracted to the vision he offered, only to then be confronted with trying to survive it." The Hollywood Reporter noted that the sales company in Cannes billed the series as "a German equivalent to HBO's Band of Brothers."

When the three-part TV film saw a limited theatrical release in the United States as a four-and-a-half-hour two-part film on 15 January 2014, The New York Times reviewer A.O. Scott stated that by not showing the Nazi death camps, Generation War perpetuates "the notion that ordinary Germans were duped by the Nazis and ignorant of the extent of their crimes." The review ends with the comment that of the five protagonists, "the artist, the intellectual and the Jew are all punished, for wantonness, weakness and naïveté, and pushed into extreme states of moral compromise, [while] the chaste, self-sacrificing Aryans, the lieutenant and the nurse, though they are not without guilt, are the heroes of the story, just as they would have been in a German film made in 1943."

According to the NPR review by Ella Taylor, the film depicts how totalitarianism corrupts almost everything in its path, including individual responsibility.

The New Yorker reviewer David Denby wrote that "Generation War has the strengths and the weaknesses of middlebrow art: it may be clunky, but it's never dull, and, once you start watching, you can't stop," and "the old accepted notion that the barbarians were confined to the S.S. and the Gestapo has been cast aside. The series acknowledges what scholars have established in recent years: that the Wehrmacht played a major role in committing atrocities in the occupied countries." But "while destroying one myth, the filmmakers have built up another. The movie says that young men and women were seduced and then savagely betrayed—brutalized by what the Nazis and the war itself put them through. Their complicity, in this account, is forced, never chosen. Aimed at today's Germans, who would like, perhaps, to come to a final reckoning with the war period, Generation War is an appeal for forgiveness. But the movie sells dubious innocence in the hope of eliciting reconciliation."

The Tablet reviewer Laurence Zuckerman said that Generation War' presented World War II Germans as tolerant and free of anti-Semitism which was "wildly out of sync" with what scholars have learned from letters, diaries, and other primary sources. In reality, "most ordinary Germans at the time held attitudes of casual racism at the very least, and a strong sense of imperial entitlement over Jews, Slavs and other races deemed racially and culturally inferior. The series tries to draw a distinction between Nazis and everyday Germans that simply did not exist in any broad way. The tagline on the movie's poster – 'What happens when the country you love betrays everything you believe?' – is demonstrably false. Most Germans believed in the Nazi agenda."

The Spectator reviewer James Delingpole criticized the series as "semi-apologia" that "had ducked frank and fearless authenticity in favour of face-saving, intellectually dishonest, respectful melodrama that leaves its audience feeling frustrated, cheated and rudderless". He criticized the film's portrayal of its main characters as non-zealots, spirited young people forced to confront unpleasant realities and make agonizing choices as ahistorical, with Delingpole describing Friedhelm as "a 21st-century German parachuted into a period where he wouldn't have survived more than a few seconds".

According to German-British journalist Alan Posener, "While the shows dealing with communist East Germany are realistic, the Third Reich gets off too lightly. None of the new productions directly addresses the Holocaust or other Nazi crimes. The dramas don’t even focus on the resistance to Hitler. Instead, most Germans appear as victims...The 2013 miniseries Unsere Mütter, unsere Väter (released as Generation War in English) continued the trend".

=== Israeli reviews ===
Uri Avnery's review of "Their Mothers, Their Fathers" appeared 28 February 2014 on International Policy Digest. Avnery himself fled from Germany to Mandatory Palestine in 1933. Concerning the film's not showing Nazi death camps, Avnery writes "The Holocaust is not the center of events, but it is there all the time, not as a separate event but woven into the fabric of reality." He describes the progression of two of the protagonists: "Death is all around them, they see horrible war crimes, they are commanded to shoot prisoners, they see Jewish children butchered. In the beginning they still dare to protest feebly, then they keep their doubts to themselves, then they take part in the crimes as a matter of course." He propounds a theory of the individual in totalitarian circumstances: "It is this element of the situation that is difficult for many people to grasp. A citizen under a criminal totalitarian regime becomes a child. Propaganda becomes for him reality, the only reality he knows. It is more effective than even the terror." He sees the Jews and the Germans as two still traumatized peoples. "That's why the film is so important, not only for the Germans, but for every people, including our own."

Uri Klein's review of Generation War appeared 2 September 2014 in Haaretz. Concerning the miniseries not showing Nazi death camps, Klein writes, "... no extermination camps are shown in the series, whose measure of brutality and blatant anti-Semitism is meted out by the Polish partisans ... and by the Russian army." This is due to the portrayal of the five main characters in a sympathetic light of "heroism and sacrifice, loyalty and betrayal, love and its price" which is detached from actual historical events. Instead of history, Klein likens the production to a typical Hollywood product of action, special effects, and a romanticized story of essentially noble individuals caught up in a war not of their choice. "The difficulties that they experience, like their personality crises, stem from the fact that, as we have learned from the movies dozens of times, war – any war – is hell."

== Score ==
The score was released in Germany on 15 March 2013 on CD and in a digital format. The CD consists of 22 pieces. The digital release of the score consists of 42 pieces.

== Awards ==
- Bavarian TV Awards, 2013
  - Won Special Award for the Ensemble Cast (Volker Bruch, Tom Schilling, Katharina Schüttler, Miriam Stein, Ludwig Trepte)
- German Television Award, 2013
  - Won Best Miniseries
  - Nominated Best Actor (Volker Bruch, Tom Schilling)
- German Television Academy Award, 2013
  - Won Best Director (Philipp Kadelbach)
  - Won Best Actor (Tom Schilling)
  - Won Best Production Design (Thomas Stammer)
  - Won Best Costume Design (Wiebke Kratz)
  - Won Best Makeup (Gerhard Zeiß)
  - Won Best Stunt (Sandra Barger, Wanja Götz)
  - Won Best Casting (Sarah Lee, Nina Haun)
- Goldene Kamera, 2014
  - Won Best TV Film
  - Nominated Best German Actress (Katharina Schüttler)
- 36th Jupiter Award, 2014
  - Won Best German TV Film
  - Nominated Best German TV Actor (Tom Schilling)
- 42nd International Emmy Awards, 2014
  - Won Best TV Movie/Mini-Series
