= Miriam Stein =

Austrian-Swiss television and film actress (born 1988

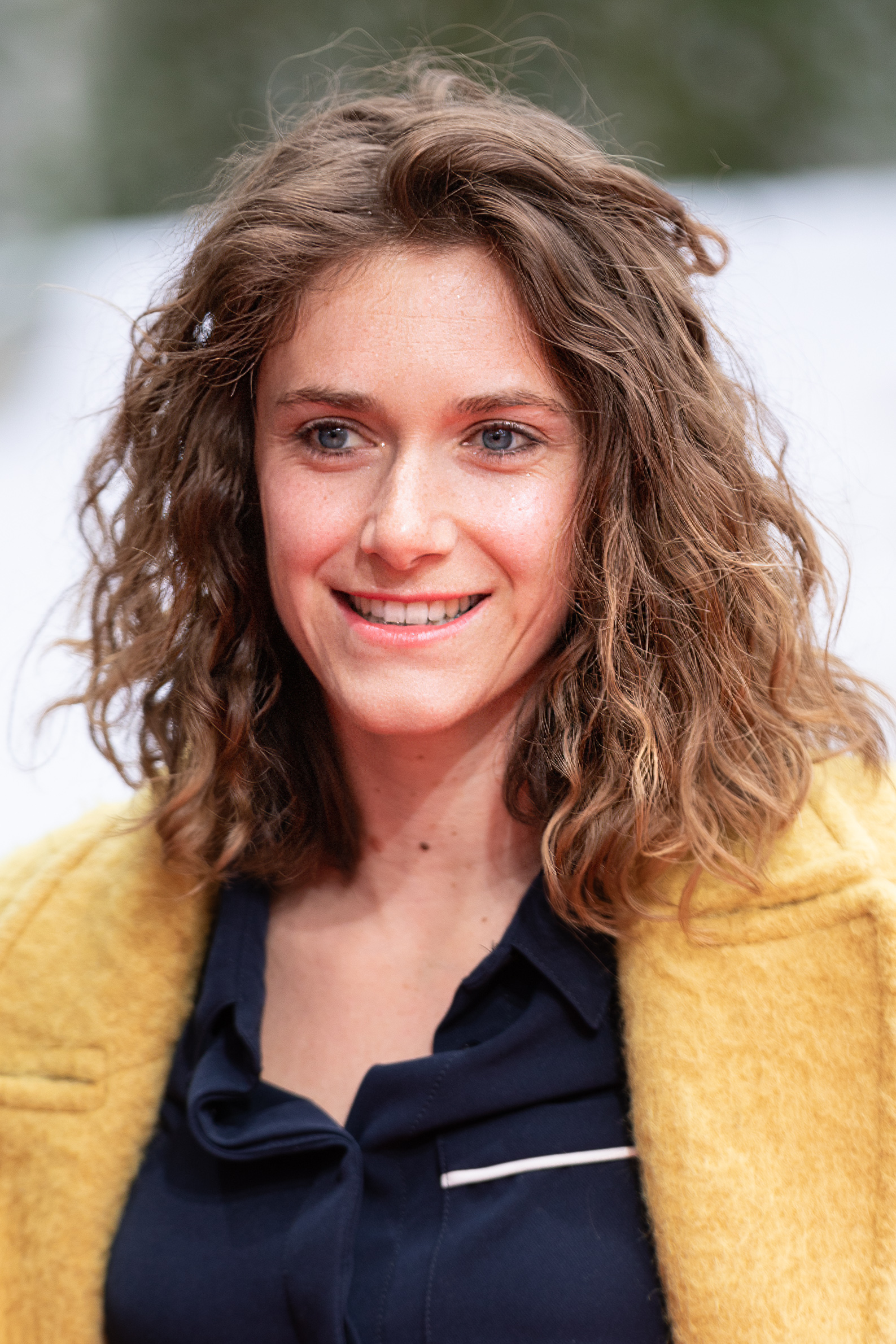
- Stein in 2019
- Born: 10 May 1988 (age 38); Vienna, Austria
- Occupation: Actress
- Years active: 1999–present
- Partner: Volker Bruch (2009–present)

Miriam Stein (born 10 May 1988) is an Austrian-Swiss television and film actress. She is best known internationally for a leading role as Charlotte in the German television drama Generation War (2013).

== Early life and education ==
Miriam Stein was born in Vienna, Austria, in 1988 or 1999, to an Austrian mother and Swiss father, television presenter Dieter Moor. She is of German-Jewish descent; her paternal grandfather was a Holocaust survivor from Germany.

She was raised in Vienna, where she began dancing and acting from a young age. She professionally acted through her teenage years before attending Zurich University of the Arts; she graduated in 2009, after which she spent a year at the Paris Conservatoire.

== Career ==
Stein's first professional role was at age ten in the 1999 television film Das Mädchen aus der Fremde; she received a German Television Award for her performance as a troubled child refugee from Kosovo. She had various small roles in television movies and shows as a young adult, before her breakout role in the 2010 film Young Goethe in Love.

Stein came to national prominence with the 2013 German miniseries Generation War in which she played one of the five protagonists. Stein won an Austrian Romy Award for her performance and received a special award for Ensemble Cast at the 2013 Bavarian TV Awards.

She won the Best Actress award for her role in One-way to Moscow at the 2020 Swiss Film Awards. In 2021, she won the Romy for the second time for her performance in the TV mini series Unterleuten: The Torn Village.

== Personal life ==
As of 2018 Stein lives in Berlin with her boyfriend, actor Volker Bruch. They had a child together in 2017. Stein met Bruch in 2009 on the set of the film Young Goethe in Love. They later starred together in 2013's Generation War, 2014's Tour de Force, and 2015's Das goldene Ufer.

== Filmography ==
Selected filmography

- Das Mädchen aus der Fremde (1999)
- Young Goethe in Love (2010)
- The Foster Boy (2011)
- Four Women and a Funeral (2012–2015)
- Generation War (2013)
- Tour de Force (2014)
- The Team (2015)
- The Origin of Violence (2016)
- 100 Things (2018)
