= Guys and Balls =

2004 German film directed by Sherry Hormann

- Theatrical release poster
- Directed by: Sherry Hormann
- Written by: Benedikt Gollhardt
- Produced by: Kirsten Hager
- Starring: Eileen Eilender; Leon Breitenborn
- Cinematography: Hanno Lentz
- Edited by: Magda Habernickel; Eva Schnare
- Music by: Martin Todsharow
- Production companies: Hager Moss Film; Medienfonds GFP; RTL
- Distributed by: Buena Vista International
- Release date: 7 October 2004
- Running time: 106 minutes
- Country: Germany
- Language: German

Guys and Balls (German: Männer wie wir, literally Men like us, UK title: Balls) is a 2004 German sports comedy/romance film by German American director Sherry Hormann about a gay goalkeeper who assembles a gay-only soccer team to play against his ex-team, which fired him due to homophobia.

== Plot ==
Ecki (Maximilian Brückner) lives with his parents who own a bakery in Boldrup, a (fictitious) small German town near Dortmund. Football, the German national pastime, is particularly popular in this heavily industrialized region and Ecki has been a player at local club FC Boldrup since his childhood.

In a decisive game, he fails to keep a ball at a penalty and the team fails to get the promotion to the district league. The team are devastated and get drunk at a party. Ecki is then evicted from the team, with his mistake being used to cover the real reason—the revelation that he is gay that comes about when he is observed by some of his teammates kissing another player Tobias on the mouth.

Ecki immediately sets out to form his own team and beat his ex-teammates at their game to form his own team and beat his ex-teammates at their game. So he sets off for Dortmund to find members for his new team with the help of his sister Susanne, who is living there. From the fans of the club Borussia Dortmund he finds confusion, but he gradually succeeds in others places, such as a kebab shop and the leather bar 'Steel Tube' to recruit more homosexual players for his team. Among those recruited are the two Brazilians Ronaldo and Ronaldinho and the heterosexual bookseller Klaus.

Meanwhile, he also manages to win the heart of dreamboy Sven (David Rott), who becomes his first boyfriend. Training of the team is done by Karl (Rolf Zacher), an ex-soccer player himself who quit the sport years ago after a stinging defeat.

When the big day of the game comes, the match starts out badly for Ecki's team, but ultimately they are able to triumph over his old teammates by allowing their homophobia to turn against themselves.

== Cast ==
- Eileen Eilender as Susanne jung 1
- Leon Breitenborn as Ecki jung 1
- Dietmar Bär as Vater (Father)
- Saskia Vester as Mutter (Mother)
- Anna Koesling as Susanne jung 2
- Steven Wellmann as Ecki jung 2
- Melody Sitta as Cordula jung
- Jan Giffel as Udo jung
- Maximilian Brückner as Ecki
- Willi Thomczyk as Wirt, Ticket seller
- Jochen Stern as Rentner Rudi
- Judith Hoersch as Cordula (billed as Judith Delphine Hoersch)
- Carlo Ljubek as Udo
- Mirko Lang as Tobias
- Tobias van Dieken as Bernhard (billed as Tobias Vandieken)
- Simon Solberg as Frank
- Felix Vörtler as Udos Vater
- Lisa Maria Potthoff as Susanne
- Hans Löw as Klaus
- Nikolai Will as Kunde in der Bäckerei, Customer
- Rolf Zacher as Trainer Karl
- Mariele Millowitsch as Wirtin Elke
- Ute Maria Lerner as Pregnant lady (Schwangere Frau)
- Nicholas Bodeux as Ehemann
- David Rott as Sven
- Heppi Pohl as beer garden Guest 1
- Dirk Koch as beer garden Guest 2
- Andreas Schmidt as Jürgen
- Michael Kleiber as BVB Fan 1
- Hans-Joachim Bauer as BVB Fan 2
- Billey Demirtas as Ercin
- Markus John as Tom
- Christian Berkel as Rudolf
- Charly Hübner as Horst
- Jeanette Goetz as male nurse (Krankenschwester) 1
- Sunia-Shahana Ali as male nurse (Krankenschwester) 2
- Marcel Nievelstein as Jan
- Sascha Herzogenrath as transvestite
- Thomas Fischer as Gay Firefighter 1
- Heup Henning Heup as Gay Firefighter 2
- Michael von Burg as Martin
- Edesson Batista De Jesus as Ronaldo
- Edilton Pereira Da Cruz as Ronaldino
- Judith Döker as Prostitute
- Sybille J. Schedwill as Jan's Mutter
- Mohammad-Ali Behboudi as Ercin's Vater
- Max Hopp as Steffen
- Helmut Schenkel as Harley rider (Harleyfahrer)
- Rolf Vogel as Harleyfahrer
- Klaus Schwen as Harleyfahrer
- Frank Krebs as Harleyfahrer
- Franz-Josef Neumann as Harleyfahrer
- Markus Kaiser as Harleyfahrer
- Dennis Schenkel as Harleyfahrer
- Wolfgang Jansen as Harleyfahrer
- Markus Meisinger as FC Boldrup Fan
- J. Geraldo Datovo as Samba-Truppe
- Heinrich Weitz as referee (Schiedsrichter) 1
- Willi Meuser as Schiedsrichter 2
- Oskar Bläser as Trainer Boldrup
- Frank Tepferd as footballer (Fußballspieler) FC Boldrup
- Stefan Nüsser as Fußballspieler FC Boldrup
- Heiko von der Bey as Fußballspieler FC Boldrup
- David Careno as Fußballspieler FC Boldrup
- Daniel Careno as Fußballspieler FC Boldrup
- Martin Watson as Fußballspieler FC Boldrup
- Christoph Paeßens as Fußballspieler FC Boldrup
- Oli Scheel as Fußballspieler FC Boldrup
- Lutz Herdener as Fußballspieler FC Boldrup
- Jan Platte as Fußballspieler FC Ruhrgold
- Willi Schaaf as Fußballspieler FC Ruhrgold
- Marc Gößlig as Fußballspieler FC Ruhrgold
- Daniel Edingloh as Fußballspieler FC Ruhrgold
- Sebastian Klein as Fußballspieler FC Ruhrgold
- Detlev Henke as Fußballspieler FC Ruhrgold
- Christoph Kanne as Fußballspieler FC Ruhrgold
- Miklas Melin as Fussballspieler FC Ruhrgold 8 (as Niklas Melin)
- Malte Kossleck as Fußballspieler FC Ruhrgold
- Christian Ernst as Fußballspieler FC Ruhrgold
- Eric Beta as Fußballspieler FC Ruhrgold

== Reaction ==
Männer wie wir may be regarded as the first major German sports comedy. While this genre is far more established in the United States with movies such as Hardball (2001) or The Mighty Ducks (1992) in which an underdog team is posed to somehow find the spirit to win an important game against a far superior opponent, these kinds of movies are relatively rare in German cinema. It may therefore not be surprising that this particular movie was made by an American-born director.

== Awards ==
- Audience Award of the Connecticut Gay & Lesbian Film Festival 2006 in the category Best Feature Film (3rd place)
- Audience Award of the Gay & Lesbian Film Festival 2005 in Philadelphia in the category Best Feature
- Audience Award of the Milano Festival Internazionale di Cinema Gaylesbico 2006 in the category Best Film
- Audience Award of Outfest 2005 in Los Angeles in the category Outstanding Narrative Feature
- Jury Award of the Lesbian & Gay Festival Brussels 2005 in the category Best Foreign Language Film
- Le Prix du public of the Gay & Lesbian Film Festival 2005 in Long Island in the category Meilleur Long Gay

=== Critical reception ===
On the review aggregator website Rotten Tomatoes, 36% of 14 critics' reviews are positive, with an average rating of 5.2/10. Metacritic, which uses a weighted average, assigned the film a score of 60 out of 100, based on 10 critics, indicating "mixed or average" reviews.

Joshua Katzman of the Chicago Reader called the film "engaging" and "well-paced" with "a vibrantly funny script". Dennis Harvey of Variety states that the film is "by-the-numbers ensemble dramedy that hits every underdog and gay-fish-out-of-water cliche on the nose". Jeanette Catsoulis of The New York Times said the "script groans with double-entendres" and it contains "lots of cheerful nudity, loving threesomes and more synonyms for "gay"".

== See also ==
- List of association football films
