= Henriette Richter-Röhl =

German actress

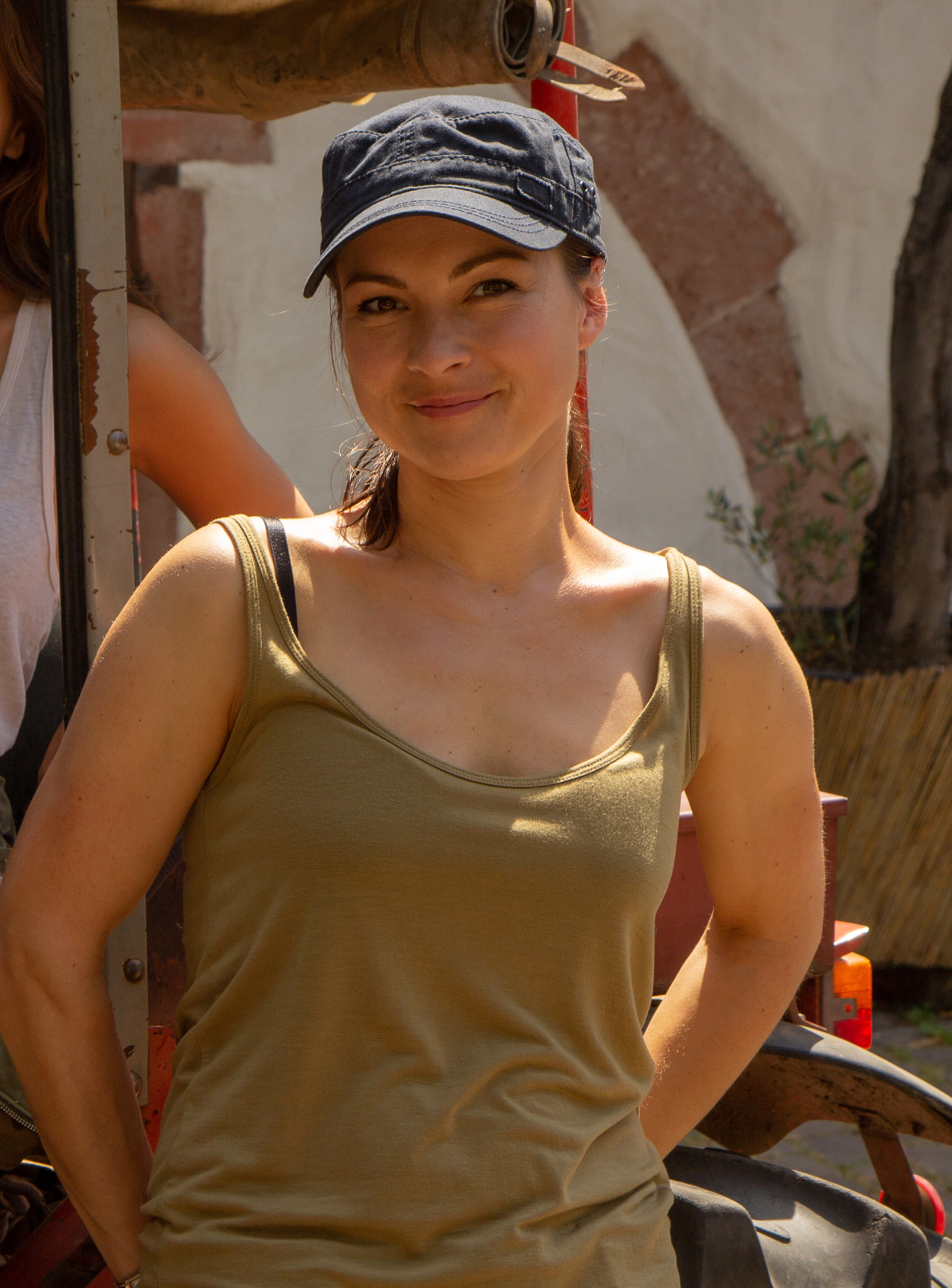
- Richter-Röhl in 2018
- Born: 9 January 1982 (age 43); East Berlin, East Germany (now Berlin, Germany)
- Occupation: Actress
- Spouse: Walter Unterweger
- Children: 1

Henriette Richter-Röhl (born 9 January 1982) is a German actress.

== Early life ==
Richter-Röhl comes from a family of actors. Her mother Siegrid Richter and her father Hans Otto Reinsch performed on stage and were seen in movies. Her brother Fridolin Richter, cousins Anna Frenzel-Röhl and Katja Frenzel and aunt Bärbel Röhl are also actors.

== Career ==
Richter-Röhl took classical singing lessons at the music school in Weissensee. From 1997 to 1999, she was the front woman of the German rock band Jeden Tag anders and won numerous competitions with the group in Berlin. She wrote the text for the soundtrack of the movie Grenzverkehr, composed with Manuel Lopez and sang the theme song.

Richter-Röhl became popular with television audiences in small supporting roles in television series such as Hallo, Onkel Doc! and Dr. Sommerfeld - Neues vom Bülowbogen and from 2000 to 2003 and 2007 as Elena Zirkowski in the soap opera Marienhof. In 2003, she decided to train as an actress and studied at the University of Music and Performing Arts Graz, where she gained theater and stage experience. She attracted attention in Stefan Betz's comedy film Grenzverkehr, in which she played an expectant mother. For her role in this film, she received the Förderpreis Deutscher Film in 2005 for "Best Actress". From September 2005 to the end of January 2007, Richter-Röhl played the main female role of Laura Mahler/Saalfeld in the first season of the ARD soap opera Storm of Love. In 2006, she was named Shooting Star of the Year 2006 by ARD magazine Brisant. In January 2010, she returned for a guest appearance on several episodes of Storm of Love.

In the 2013 World War II drama Generation War, she played a supporting role as a nurse. In the 2009 three-part television film series Vorzimmer zur Hölle, Richter-Röhl played the main role of Jule Engelhardt, who is promoted to the board of a cosmetics company due to unusual circumstances.

== Personal life ==
In her free time, Richter-Röhl devotes herself to painting. She is married to Walter Unterweger. They have a daughter and live in Berlin.
