= Volker Bruch =

German television and film actor (born 1980)

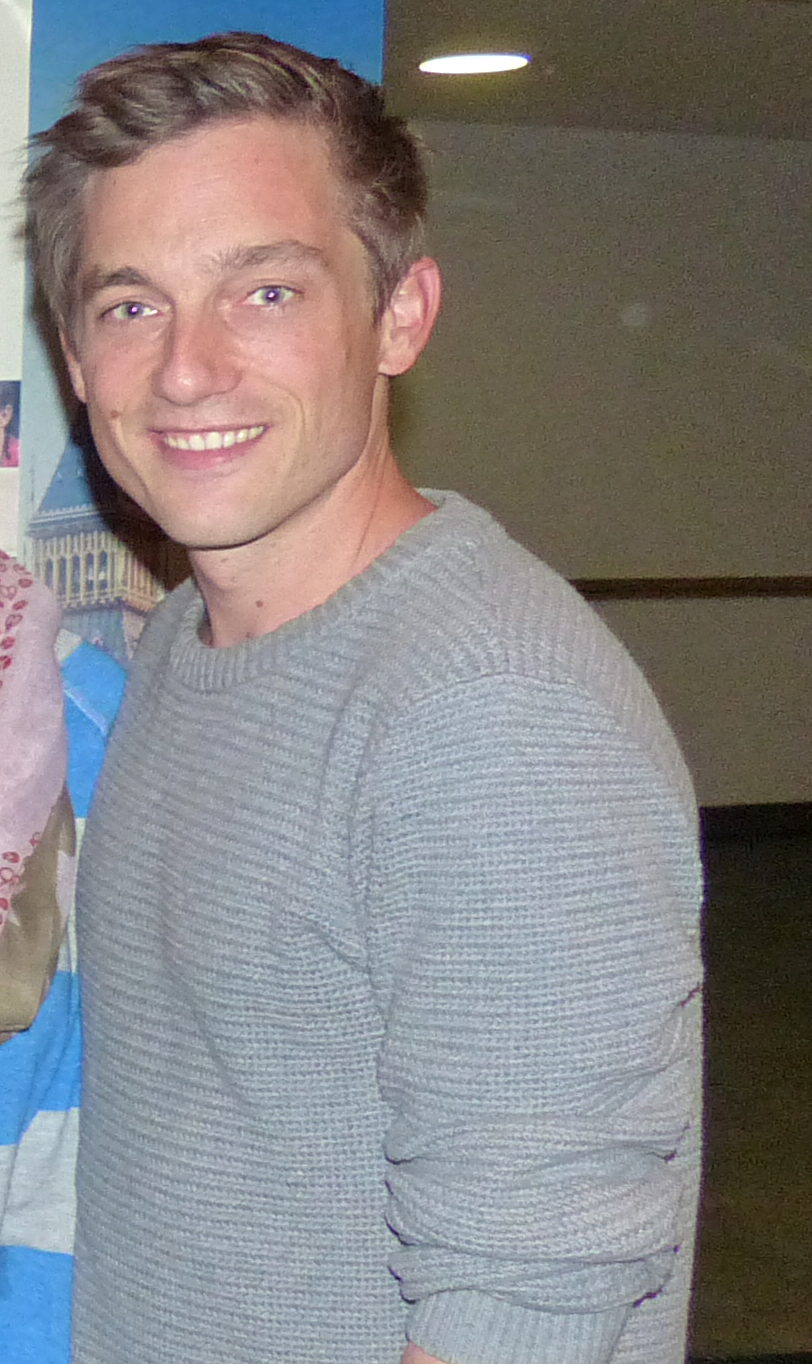
- Bruch in 2014
- Born: 9 March 1980 (age 46); Munich, Bavaria, West Germany
- Occupation: Actor
- Years active: 2002–present
- Partner: Miriam Stein (2009–present)
- Children: 1

Volker Bruch (German: [ˈfɔlkɐ ˈbʁʊx]; born 9 March 1980) is a German television and film actor. He is best known internationally for his leading roles as Wilhelm Winter in the television drama Generation War (2013) and as Inspector Gereon Rath in the neo-noir series Babylon Berlin (2017–present); for the latter, he was awarded the 2018 Grimme-Preis, Germany's most prestigious television award. In film, he was part of the ensemble cast of two films nominated for Academy Awards in 2009: The Reader (Best Picture) and The Baader Meinhof Complex (Best Foreign Language Film); more recently, he appeared in the thriller The Girl in the Spider's Web (2018) and Race for Glory: Audi vs. Lancia (2024).

== Early life and education ==
Volker Bruch was born in 1980 in West Germany to a German father and Austrian mother. He grew up in Munich with five siblings.

He began acting during his years at gymnasium (high school) and was involved with student acting groups. After completing his university-entrance diploma, he studied performing arts at the Max Reinhardt Seminar in Vienna, Austria. Bruch made a deliberate choice while studying to commit himself to acting for television and film, as opposed to theater. During this time, he made some of his first television appearances. He graduated in 2005.

== Career ==
Bruch spent the beginning of his career primarily playing small roles in German television and TV movie productions. His first noteworthy role was as Axi in the 2005 German television movie Rose, for which he won a German Television Award for Best Supporting Actor. The year 2008 was notable for Bruch's career as he acted in a number of movies including the French film Female Agents, the English-language German biopic The Red Baron as Oberleutnant Lothar Freiherr von Richthofen, the Oscar-nominated German film The Baader Meinhof Complex as Stefan Aust, as well as the Oscar-winning American film The Reader.

Bruch had a few small supporting roles after this period before his breakout role in the popular 2013 German miniseries Generation War in which he played one of the five protagonists. Bruch was nominated for a German Television Award for his performance and received a special award for Ensemble Cast at the 2013 Bavarian TV Awards.

After Generation War, Bruch starred in a variety of film and television productions of varying scopes until 2016 when he was cast in Babylon Berlin. In Babylon Berlin, Bruch stars as the main character, police inspector Gereon Rath, who investigates a series of crimes in Weimar Republic-era Berlin. The first two series of the show were filmed over eight months beginning in May 2016 and released consecutively in the fall of 2017. Babylon Berlin has been very popular in Germany as well as with international audiences and has elevated Bruch to international prominence; Bruch is considered one of Germany's upcoming stars. For his portrayal, Bruch received a 2018 Golden Camera Award and shares an Adolf Grimme Award with the Babylon Berlin team.

The show went on a yearlong production hiatus during which Bruch filmed two movies; in 2018, he played a role in the wide-release American film The Girl in the Spider's Web and filmed the German production Rocca Changes the World. In late 2018, Bruch began the six-month shoot for the third series of Babylon Berlin which premiered in Germany in January 2020. A fourth series starring Bruch was produced mid-2021 and was released in 2022.

In 2022, he was cast as German rally driver Walter Röhrl in the English-language film Race for Glory: Audi vs. Lancia, formerly known as 2 Win. Starring opposite Daniel Brühl and Riccardo Scamarcio, the film depicts the 1983 World Rally Championship and will be released January 2024.

== Personal life ==
Bruch lives in Berlin with his girlfriend, actress Miriam Stein. They had a child together in 2017. Bruch met Stein in 2009 on the set of the film Young Goethe in Love. Notably, they later starred together in 2013's Generation War, 2014's Tour de Force, and 2015's Das goldene Ufer.

Bruch speaks English fluently, and has acted in English.

=== Advocacy ===
Bruch is an environmentalist and, with his partner Stein, has supported the climate action group Extinction Rebellion as well as the Joint Declaration made by the German government and media industry "for the sustainable production of films and television series."

In 2019, Bruch, along with other German actors and artists like Daniel Brühl, signed a petition advocating against the election of a far-right Alternative for Germany mayoral candidate in Görlitz, Germany, an oft-used filming location in Europe.

In June 2020, Bruch took part in the video "Was sie mitgenommen haben" for the United Nations High Commissioner For Refugees (UNHCR).

Bruch is a vocal opponent of the restrictions introduced in Germany to curb the spread of COVID-19. In May 2021, it was reported that Bruch had applied to join the Grassroots Democratic Party of Germany, an anti-lockdown fringe party.

== Filmography ==
=== Television ===
Year	Title	Role	Notes
2002	Vater wider Willen	Sammy	Episode: "Große Kinder - Kleine Kinder"
2003	SK Kölsch	Bert Wunderlich	Episode: "CSD"
2004	SOKO Kitzbühel	Julian Schweiger	Episode: "Tödliches Dreieck"
2004	Inspector Rex	Max König	Episode: "Nina um Mitternacht"
2004	Baal (de)	Johannes	Television film
2004–2013	Tatort	various	4 episodes
2004	Die Verbrechen des Professor Capellari	Bernd Geissler	Episode: "Ein Toter kehrt zurück"
2005	Leipzig Homicide	Marco Hoss	Episode: "Die Polizistin"
2005	Unter weißen Segeln	Florian	Episode: "Abschiedsvorstellung"
2005	Hengstparade (de)	Markus Lex	Television movie
2005	Der Untergang der Pamir (de)	Bernd Russek	Television movie
2007	Der Staatsanwalt	Bastian Tressen	Episode: "Glückskinder"
2007	Ein starkes Team	Tim König	Episode: "Stumme Wut"
2007	Nichts ist vergessen (de)	Olaf Stahmann	Television movie Nominated – German Television Award
2008	Machen wir's auf Finnisch (de)	Matti	Television movie
2008	Einer bleibt sitzen (de)	Michel	Television movie
2011	Treasure Guards	Luca	Television movie; English language
2013	Generation War	Wilhelm Winter	Miniseries; 3 episodes Nominated – German Television Award; Won – Bavarian TV Awards
2013	München Mord (de)	Toni Bernlocher	Television movie
2014	Die Pilgerin	Otfried Willinger	Miniseries; 2 episodes
2015	Das goldene Ufer	Walther Fichtner	Television movie
2016	Ein Teil von uns (de)	Micki	Television movie
2017–present	Babylon Berlin	Gereon Rath	28 episodes Won – Golden Camera Award; Won – Grimme Award
2019	Jerks (de)	Volker	Episode: "Volker"

=== Film ===
Year	Title	Role	Notes
2003	Getting a Life (Raus ins Leben)		
2005	Rose (de)	Axi	Nominated – German Television Award
2006	Life Actually (de)	Charles Spatz	
2007	Good Times (de)	Priglmeier Toni	
2008	The Best Place to Be (de)	Toni	
2008	Female Agents	Lieutenant Becker	French language
2008	The Red Baron	Oberleutnant Lothar von Richthofen	
2008	Little Paris	Stefan	
2008	The Baader Meinhof Complex	Stefan Aust	Nominated – Undine Award (de)
2008	The Reader	Dieter	English language
2009	The Murder Farm (de)	Johann Hauer	
2010	Nanga Parbat	Gerd Bauer	
2010	Young Goethe in Love	Wilhelm Jerusalem	
2011	Westwind	Nico	
2012	Confession of a Child of the Century	Henri Smith	English language
2013	Radical Evil	Narrator	
2014	Beste Chance (de)	Toni	
2012	Tour de Force	Finn	
2015	Outside the Box	Frederick Schopner	
2015	Suck Me Shakespeer 2	Hauke Wölki	
2017	The Man with the Iron Heart	Walter Schellenberg	English language
2018	The Girl in the Spider's Web	Peter Ahlgren	English language
2019	Rocca Changes the World (de)	Henning	
2022	The Path (de)	Ludwig	
2024	Race for Glory: Audi vs. Lancia	Walter Röhrl	English language
2026	Lapland War	Major Duisberg	Finnish language

== Accolades ==
Year	Award	Category	Work	Result	Notes
2007	German Television Awards	Best Supporting Actor/Actress (de)	Nichts ist vergessen / Rose	Nominated	
2008	Undine Awards (de)	Best Young Supporting Actor - Film	The Baader Meinhof Complex	Nominated	
2013	German Television Awards	Best Actor (de)	Generation War	Nominated	Shared with Tom Schilling
2013	Bavarian TV Awards	Special Ensemble Award (de)	Generation War	Won	Shared with Tom Schilling, Katharina Schüttler, Miriam Stein, and Ludwig Trepte
2018	Golden Camera	Best German Actor (de)	Babylon Berlin	Won	
2018	Grimme Awards	Fiction Award (de)	Babylon Berlin	Won	Shared with Babylon Berlin production team and cast
