= Colonia (film) =

- UK theatrical release poster
- Directed by: Florian Gallenberger
- Written by: Torsten Wenzel; Florian Gallenberger
- Produced by: Benjamin Herrmann; Nicholas Steil; Christian Becker; James Spring
- Starring: Emma Watson; Daniel Brühl; Michael Nyqvist
- Cinematography: Kolja Brandt
- Edited by: Hansjörg Weißbrich
- Music by: André Dziezuk; Fernando Velázquez
- Production companies: Majestic Filmproduktion; Beta Cinema; Iris Productions; Rat Pack Filmproduktion; Rezo Productions; Fred Films; ProSieben; Sky
- Distributed by: Signature Entertainment (United Kingdom); Majestic Filmverleih (Germany); Rezo Films (France)
- Release dates: 13 September 2015 (TIFF); 18 February 2016 (Germany); 1 July 2016 (United Kingdom); 20 July 2016 (France)
- Running time: 110 minutes
- Countries: Germany; Luxembourg; France; United Kingdom
- Languages: English; Spanish
- Box office: $3.6 million

Colonia (released in the UK as The Colony) is a 2015 historical thriller film directed by Florian Gallenberger, produced by Benjamin Herrmann, written by Torsten Wenzel and Gallenberger, and starring Emma Watson, Daniel Brühl, and Michael Nyqvist. The film is set against the backdrop of the 1973 Chilean military coup and the Colonia Dignidad, a notorious cult in the South of Chile, led by German lay preacher Paul Schäfer. Colonia is an international co-production of companies in the UK, Germany, Luxembourg, and France.

Principal photography began on 2 October 2014 in Luxembourg; filming also took place in Germany and Argentina. Colonia held its world premiere at the 2015 Toronto International Film Festival in the Special Presentations section. The film was released in Germany on 18 February 2016, in the United Kingdom on 1 July 2016, and in France on 20 July 2016.

== Plot ==
In 1973, Lena is a strong, independent and adventurous West German Lufthansa stewardess and is in relationship with Daniel, a West German journalist and leftist activist living in Chile. Upon arrival in Santiago, she reunites with him and they spend their days in the capital peacefully.

One day, the two become entangled in the 1973 Chilean coup d'état by General Augusto Pinochet, in which supporters of deposed President Salvador Allende are getting rounded up by the military. Daniel and Lena try to escape, but like thousands of others, they are picked up and taken to the National Stadium in Santiago, where a defector identifies Allende's supporters. Some are shot on the spot, others, including Daniel, are abducted by Pinochet's secret police DINA. After Lena is released, she tries to find and save him. The pursuit leads her to "Colonia Dignidad", an isolated secret organisation living in a sealed-off rural farmland and enclave near the Andes mountains. The organisation presents itself as a charitable mission run by Paul Schäfer, a former Wehrmacht colonel and army medic who evaded capture and trial following World War II by disguising himself as a Lutheran pastor and lay minister, later fleeing to Chile to build the organisation.

Lena joins the organisation to rescue Daniel, only to learn it is a cult that combines Baptist-style tenets, punitive agrarian lifestyles, Nazism, and aggressive anti-Communism, from which no one has ever escaped. She witnesses Doro, a fellow member, get brutally beaten and humiliated at the men's section after it is revealed that she wanted to marry another cult member. Lena skinny dips in a nearby pond in order to be brought over to the men's section for the same punishments so that she can find Daniel. After a power outage, she later finds him; he has acted mentally disabled so he would be overlooked. When they reunite, the couple discover the organisation is also an illegal operations centre for DINA, who also use it as a political prison, trafficking ring, and torture venue for dissidents of Pinochet.

With the help of a pregnant nurse named Ursel, Lena and Daniel attempt to escape from Colonia Dignidad. During the escape, they are discovered and Ursel is killed by a spring-gun, but Lena and Daniel escape to Santiago and find refuge in the West German embassy where they are issued new passports and return flight tickets. After they arrive at Santiago International Airport, they discover that the West German ambassador and the embassy staff are cooperating with Schäfer, but they manage to make their escape at the airport and exit the country by air, with incriminating photographic evidence against Colonia Dignidad.

== Cast ==
- Emma Watson as Lena, a young flight attendant working for the German airline Lufthansa who joins the cult Colonia Dignidad to rescue her boyfriend Daniel.
- Daniel Brühl as Daniel, Lena's boyfriend, a West German activist working in Chile as a journalist who is kidnapped by General Augusto Pinochet's secret police DINA.
- Michael Nyqvist as Paul Schäfer, the leader of Colonia Dignidad.
- Richenda Carey as Gisela
- Vicky Krieps as Ursel
- Jeanne Werner as Doro
- Julian Ovenden as Roman Breuer
- August Zirner as German Ambassador
- Martin Wuttke as Niels Biedermann
- César Bordón as Manuel Contreras
- Nicolás Barsoff as Jorge
- Marcelo Vilaro as Augusto Pinochet

== Production ==
On 29 September 2014, it was announced that Emma Watson and Daniel Brühl would star as a couple in the upcoming film which is based on a real historical background, directed by Florian Gallenberger who co-wrote the script with Torsten Wenzel. Benjamin Herrmann would be producing the film through Majestic Filmproduktion, and Nicolas Steil would co-produce through Iris Productions. Kolja Brandt would be director of photography, and Hansjörg Weißbrich would be the film editor. On 27 October, Michael Nyqvist joined the film to star as Paul Schäfer.

Principal photography began on 2 October 2014 in Luxembourg, where it was shot in Haut-Martelange near Rambrouch on the Luxembourg-Belgium border. Filming in Luxembourg lasted through the end of October, and then the production moved to Germany for further shooting in Munich and Berlin. It was also shot in Buenos Aires until early 2015.

== Release ==
Colonia premiered at the 2015 Toronto International Film Festival on 13 September 2015. Shortly after, Screen Media Films acquired U.S distribution rights to the film. The film also screened at the Berlin International Film Festival on 12 February 2016. The film was released in Germany on 18 February 2016 by Majestic Filmverleih, in the United Kingdom on 1 July 2016 by Signature Entertainment. and in France on 20 July 2016 by Rezo Films. The film was released to a limited run in the United States and Canada on 15 April 2016.

== Reception ==
=== Box office ===
Colonia grossed $15,709 in the United States and Canada and $3.6 million in other countries, giving a worldwide total of $3.62 million. In Germany, Colonia grossed $608,337 in its opening weekend. After seven weeks, the film grossed a total of $1.9 million. In the United Kingdom, the film was released in three cinemas nationwide, as part of a distribution deal geared towards video-on-demand. The film grossed just $61 (£47) in its opening weekend.

=== Critical response ===
On review aggregation website Rotten Tomatoes the film has a rating of 26% based on 47 reviews, with an average rating of 4.23/10.

=== Accolades ===
Colonia received 5 nominations from the German Film Awards, including Best Supporting Actor.

Year	Award	Category	Recipients	Result	Ref.
2016	Bavarian Film Awards	Best Production	Benjamin Herrmann; Christian Becker	Won	
2016	German Film Awards	Best Editing	Hansjörg Weißbrich	Nominated	
2016	German Film Awards	Best Production Design	Bernd Lepel	Nominated	
2016	German Film Awards	Best Costume Design	Nicole Fischnaller	Nominated	
2016	German Film Awards	Best Sound	Carlo Thoss; Frank Kruse; Bruno Tarrière	Nominated	
2016	German Film Awards	Best Performance by an Actor in a Supporting Role	Michael Nyqvist	Nominated	
2016	Golden Trailer Awards	Best Foreign Thriller Trailer	Screen Media Films; Zealot UK	Nominated	
2016	Women Film Critics Circle Awards	Adrienne Shelly Award	Colonia	Nominated	
2016	Women Film Critics Circle Awards	Best Female Action Hero	Emma Watson	Nominated	
2017	Jupiter Awards	Best International Actress	Emma Watson	Nominated	
