= Tour de Force (film) =

2014 film

- Film poster
- Directed by: Christian Zübert
- Written by: Christian Zübert; Ariane Schröder
- Produced by: Florian Gallenberger; Benjamin Herrmann
- Starring: Florian David Fitz; Julia Koschitz; Jürgen Vogel; Miriam Stein; Volker Bruch; Hannelore Elsner
- Cinematography: Ngo The Chau
- Edited by: Mona Bräuer
- Music by: Siggi Mueller; Egon Riedel
- Production company: Majestic Filmproduktion
- Distributed by: Majestic Filmverleih
- Release dates: 9 August 2014 (Locarno); 23 October 2014 (Germany)
- Running time: 95 minutes
- Country: Germany
- Language: German
- Box office: $2,2 million

Tour de Force (German: Hin und weg) is a 2014 German drama film directed by Christian Zübert, produced by Florian Gallenberger and Benjamin Herrmann and starring Florian David Fitz, Julia Koschitz, Jürgen Vogel and Miriam Stein. It was screened in the Contemporary World Cinema section at the 2014 Toronto International Film Festival and in the Grand Piazzia Section of the Locarno International Film Festival.

== Cast ==
- Florian David Fitz as Hannes
- Julia Koschitz as Kiki
- Jürgen Vogel as Michael
- Miriam Stein as Sabine
- Volker Bruch as Finn
- Johannes Allmayer as Dominik
- Victoria Mayer as Mareike
- Hannelore Elsner as Irene

== Awards ==
Florian David Fitz received the Jupiter Award 2015 as Best Actor.

== Reception ==
Indiewire wrote: "There have been a lot of narrative features and documentaries made on euthanasia, but “Tour De Force” manages to become a unique and emotionally immersive experience on the subject by sidestepping all of the surrounding political controversy and focusing entirely on the psychological and spiritual effects the practice has on people. It's a powerful experience that's remarkably tender and human, equally heartbreaking and life affirming. “Tour De Force” is a powerful drama about the value of life, friendship, and love, as well as the inevitable grieving process one has to survive upon the loss of a loved one."
