= Liya Kebede =

Ethiopian model, fashion designer and actress

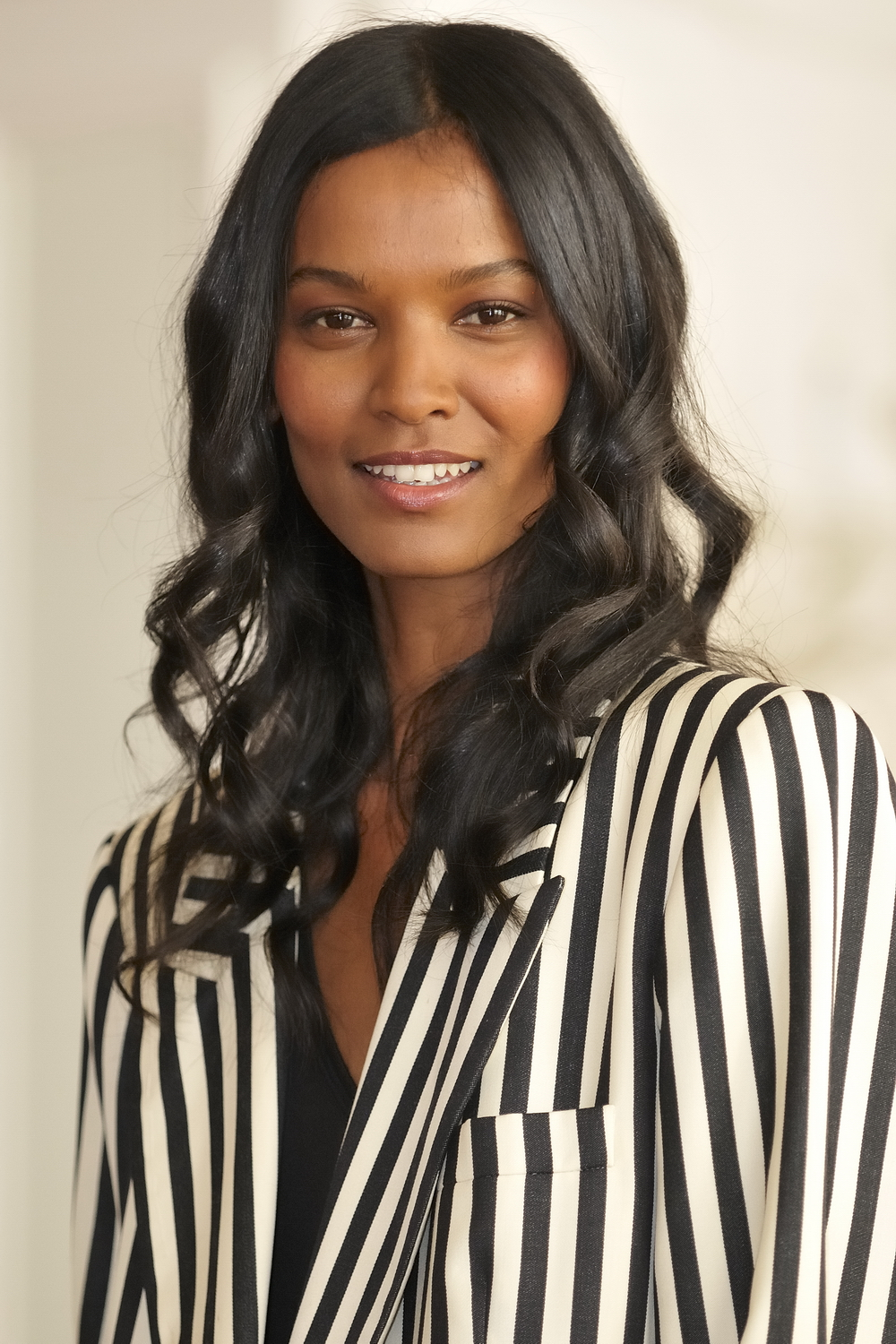
- Kebede in 2009
- Born: 1 March 1978 (age 48); Addis Ababa, Ethiopia
- Occupation: Model
- Years active: 2000–present
- Spouse: Kassy Kebede (m. 2000; div. 2015)
- Children: 2
- Modeling information
- Height: 1.78 m (5 ft 10 in)
- Hair color: Brown
- Eye color: Brown
- Agency: DNA Model Management (New York); IMG Models (London, Sydney, Los Angeles); VIVA Model Management (Paris, Barcelona); d'management group (Milan); Iconic Management (Hamburg)

Liya Kebede (Amharic: ሊያ ከበደ; born 1 March 1978) is an Ethiopian-born model, maternal health advocate, clothing designer, and actress. She has appeared on the cover of Vogue 20 times.

Kebede has served as the WHO's Ambassador for Maternal, Newborn and Child Health since 2005.

== Early life and education ==
Kebede was born and raised in Addis Ababa, Ethiopia. She is ethnic Amhara. She is the only daughter in the family, having four brothers. A film director spotted her while she was attending the French international Lycée Guébré-Mariam, the school in which she learned fluent French, and introduced her to a French modeling agent. After completing her studies, she moved to France to pursue work through a Parisian agency. Kebede later relocated to the US, initially to Chicago then New York City.

== Modeling career ==
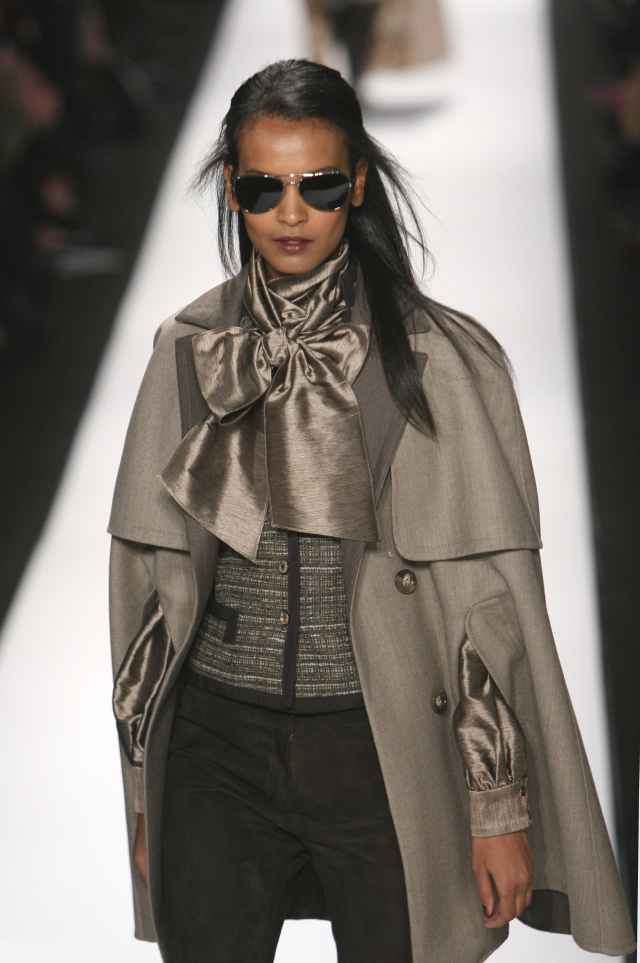
Kebede at a Carolina Herrera fashion show (2008)

Kebede's big break came when Tom Ford asked her for an exclusive contract for his Gucci Fall/Winter 2000 fashion show. Then in May 2002 she was on the cover of Paris Vogue, which dedicated the entire issue to her.

Kebede has been seen on the covers of Italian, Japanese, American, French and Spanish Vogue, V, i-D and Time's Style & Design. She has been featured in ad campaigns including those for Shiatzy Chen, Gap, Yves Saint-Laurent, Victoria's Secret, Emanuel Ungaro, Tommy Hilfiger, Revlon, Dolce & Gabbana, Escada and Louis Vuitton.

In 2003, Kebede was named the newest face of Estée Lauder cosmetics, the only Ethiopian to serve as their representative in the company's 57-year history. Her contract was rumoured to be worth $3 million. At this time in Kebede's career, she was ranked #1 on models.com.

In July 2007, with Kebede earning $2.5 million over the previous 12 months, Forbes named her eleventh in the list of the World's 15 Top-Earning Supermodels. The following year, casting agent James Scully likened her to "an exotic Grace Kelly".

In 2009, Kebede starred in the film adaptation of the bestselling autobiography Desert Flower by former supermodel Waris Dirie. The film recounts Dirie's childhood in Somalia, her rise to stardom and subsequent awareness campaign against female circumcision. It premiered at the Venice Film Festival and received a standing ovation. Kebede has also had minor roles in The Good Shepherd (2006) and Lord of War (2005). She featured as a 'Face of the Moment' in May 2009's US Vogue.

In 2011, Kebede was among the models featured in Lacoste's "new look" campaign in January, with ads shot by Mert and Marcus, showing models wearing white Lacoste polo shirts worn over black eveningwear.

Kebede starred with Jake Gyllenhaal in a Calvin Klein ad.

Kebede is currently on the list of "New Supers" by models.com.

=== Lemlem ===
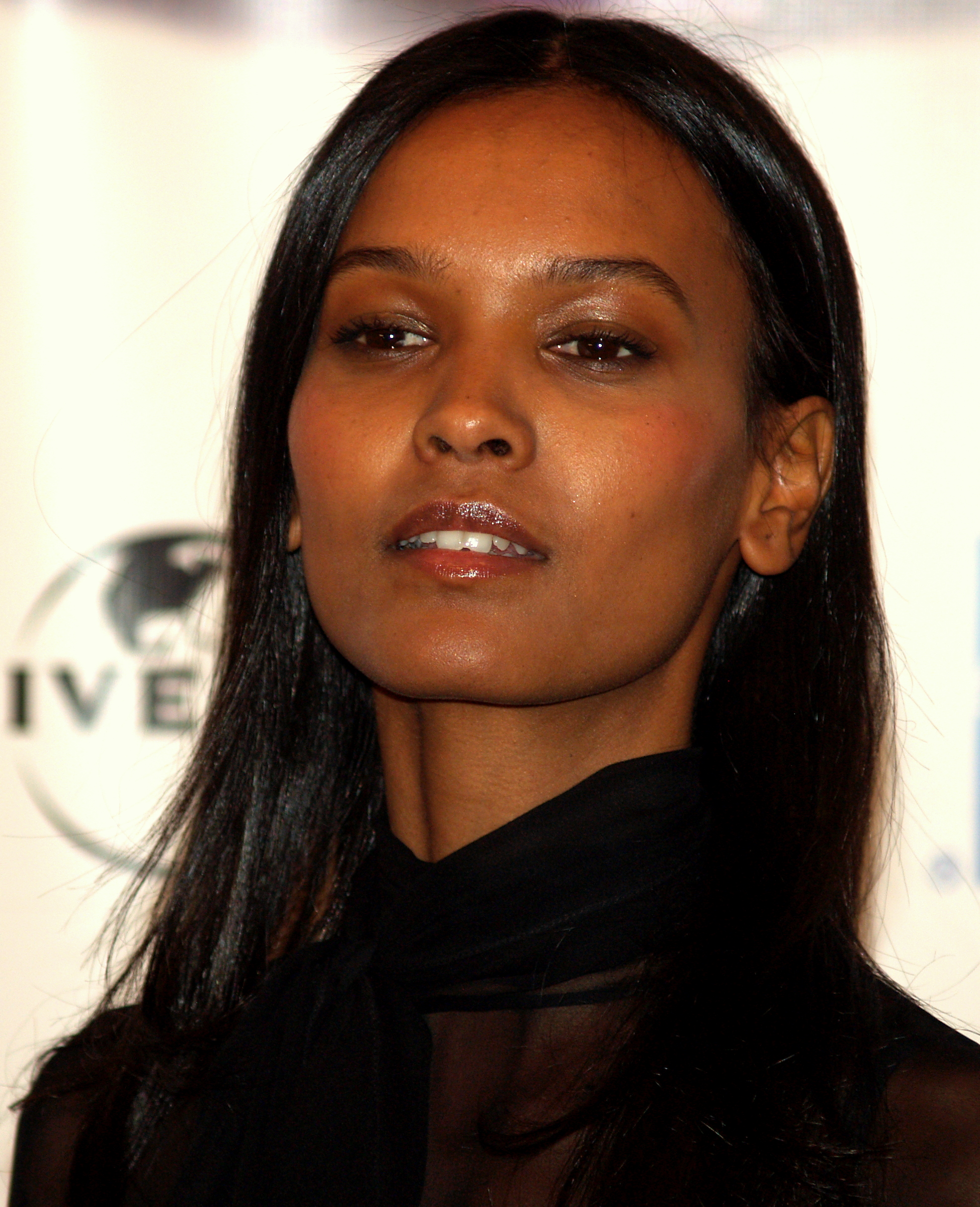
Kebede at the 2008 Tribeca Film Festival.

Kebede launched Lemlem, a clothing line, in 2007. Lemlem, which means "to bloom" in Amharic, features hand-spun, woven and embroidered women and children's clothing. Kebede founded the line to help preserve the art of traditional weaving in Ethiopia, and to offer work opportunities to local artisans. The line is sold in 150 retailers.

== Advocacy ==
In 2005, Kebede was appointed as WHO Goodwill Ambassador for Maternal, Newborn and Child Health. She then founded the Liya Kebede Foundation, whose mission is to reduce maternal, newborn and child mortality in Ethiopia and around the world. The organization funds advocacy and awareness-raising projects as well as providing direct support for low-cost technologies, community-based education, and training and medical programs. In one health center that the foundation works with, hospital deliveries rose by over 50% in 12 months.

Kebede has traveled to Ethiopia to support maternal health projects on multiple occasions. In 2009, she worked with the Bill & Melinda Gates Foundation as part of their Living Proof Project. Kebede served as a High-Level adviser for the Center for Global Development's 2009 report "Start with a Girl: A New Agenda for Global Health".

Kebede writes for The Huffington Post about maternal and child health, and has been featured in Vogue and on The Daily Beast. She is also part of the Champions for an HIV-Free Generation, an organization of African leaders led by former President of Botswana Festus Mogae.

== Awards ==
In 2013, Kebede was named one of Glamour's Women of the Year for her philanthropic work through her Liya Kebede Foundation.

== Personal life ==
In 2000, Kebede married Ethiopian Kassy Kebede, manager of Cepheus Growth Capital Partners, a hedge fund that invests into Ethiopia's most promising companies and entrepreneurs. They have two children together: son Suhul (September 2000) and daughter Raee (August 2005). As of 2007, the family resided in New York City. She is fluent in Amharic (her native language), English, and French.

== Filmography ==
Year	Title	Role
2005	Lord of War	Faith
2006	The Good Shepherd	Miriam
2009	Desert Flower	Waris Dirie
2011	Black Gold	Aicha
2012	Sur la Piste du Marsupilami	Reine Paya
2012	Capital	Nassim
2013	The Best Offer	Sarah
2013	Innocence	Moira Neal
2014	Samba	Magali dite Gracieuse
2018	Nicky Larson et le Parfum de Cupidon	Dominique, professor's daughter
