= Julia Koschitz =

Austrian actress

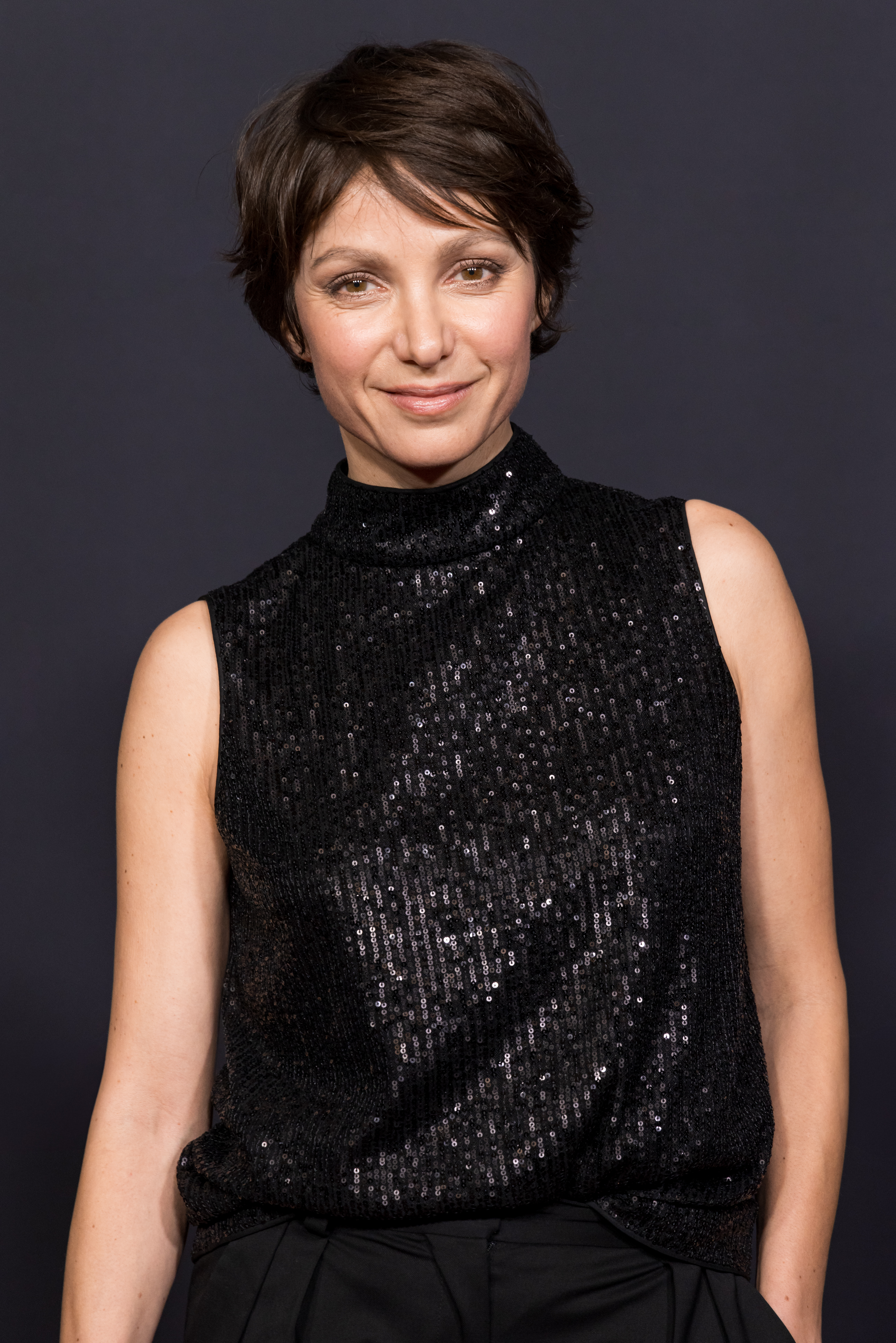
- Born: 26 December 1974 (age 51); Brussels, Belgium
- Occupation: Actress
- Years active: 2005-present

Julia Koschitz (born 26 December 1974) is an Austrian actress. She has appeared in more than forty films since 2005.

== Selected filmography ==
Year	Title	Role	Notes
2006	Shoppen	Susanna	
2009	Where to with Dad?	Paula	TV film
2010	Collapse	Andrea Fichtner	TV film
2010	Der letzte schöne Herbsttag	Claire	
2011	Vanished	Lisa Binder	TV film
2011	Men Are Wired One Way, Women Another	Alice Tanner	TV film
2011	A Day for a Miracle	Dr. Lydia Martischek	TV film
2011	The Last Fine Day	Sybille Langhoff	
2012	Glory: A Tale of Mistaken Identities	Elisabeth	
2013	Take Good Care of Him	Miriam	TV film
2014	Tour de Force	Kiki	
2015	When Summer Ends	Sylvia Taudes	TV film
2015	Ghosthunters on Icy Trails	Patricia Thompson	
2015	Invisible Years	Bea Kanter	TV film
2016	Jonathan	Anka	
2016	A Minute's Silence	Stella	TV film
2016	Das Sacher	Martha Aderhold	TV film
2017	Gift	Juliette Pribeau	TV film
2019	Delirium	Karla Eckhardt	TV film
2020	The Magic Kids: Three Unlikely Heroes	Julia	
2022	Eismayer	Christina Eismayer	
