= Private Lies =

2001 film directed by Sherry Hormann

Private Lies is a 2001 drama film directed by Sherry Hormann. It was made for German television.

== Premise ==
A housewife and mother grows tired of her husband and falls under the spell of her handsome neighbor.

== Cast ==
- Martina Gedeck as Sarah
- John Corbett as David
- Vyto Ruginis as Bob
- Marianne Sägebrecht as Betty
- Rosemarie Fendel as Emma
- Margaret Colin as Ellen
- Kevin Chapman
- Peter Gerety
