= Sherry Hormann =

German-American film director (born 1960)

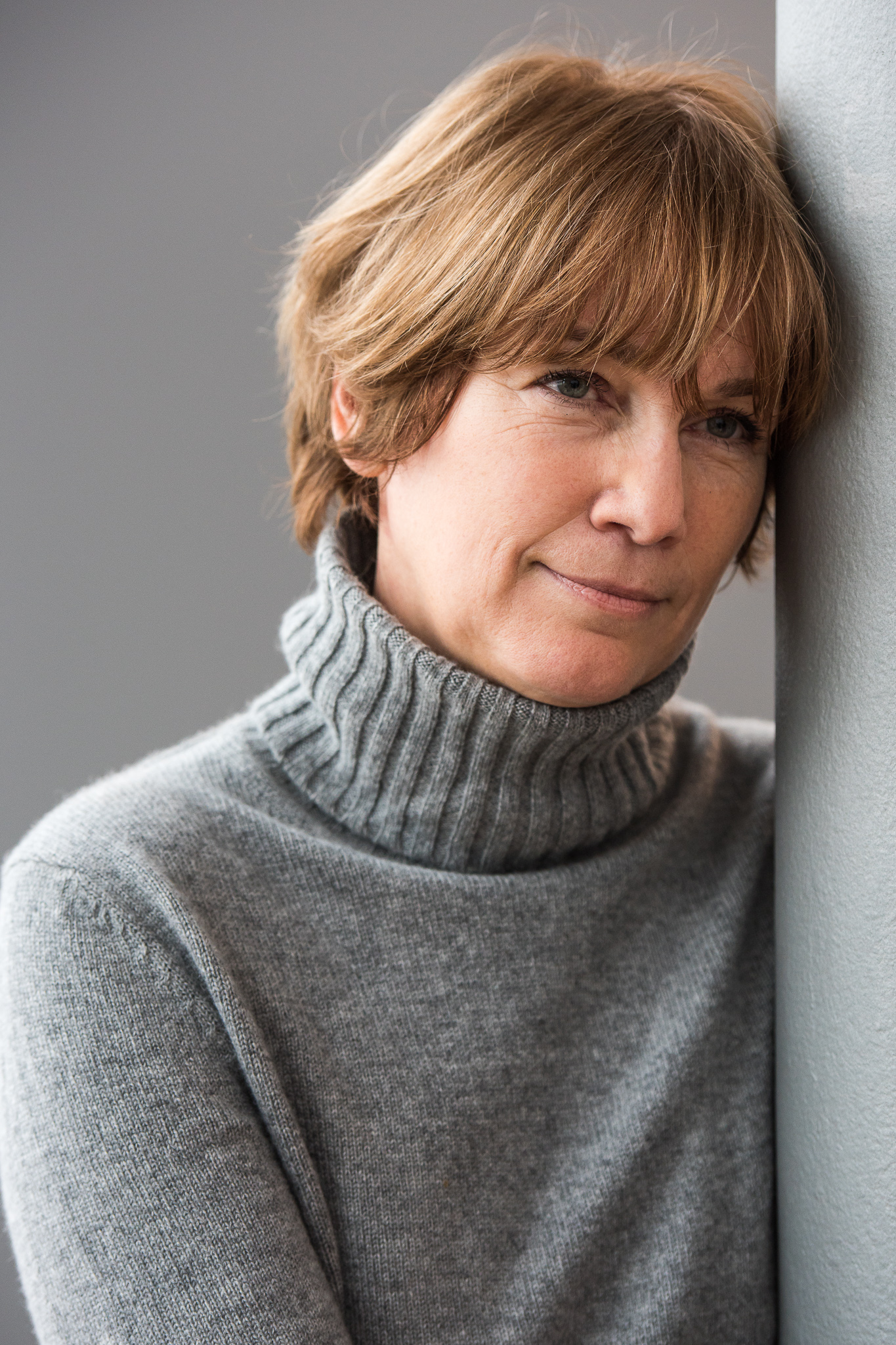
- Sherry Hormann in 2016
- Born: 20 April 1960 (age 66); Kingston, New York, U.S.
- Occupation: Director
- Years active: 1981–present
- Spouse: Michael Ballhaus (m. 2011; died 2017)

Sherry Hormann (born 20 April 1960) is a German-American film director. Hormann is best known for her movies Guys and Balls (2004), Desert Flower (2009) and 3096 Days (2013).

Hormann was born in the United States, but moved to Germany in 1966, when she was six years old. She attended the University of Television and Film Munich (HFF) and mainly works in German cinema.

She was married to film director Dominik Graf. In October 2011, she married cinematographer Michael Ballhaus; he died in April 2017.

== Selected filmography ==
- 1991: Silent Shadow
- 1994: Women Are Simply Wonderful
- 1996: Father's Day
- 1998: Die Cellistin (TV film)
- 1998: Widows – Erst die Ehe, dann das Vergnügen
- 1998: Denk ich an Deutschland … – Angst spür’ ich, wo kein Herz ist (TV documentary series episode)
- 2001: Private Lies (TV film)
- 2002: Against All Evidence (TV film)
- 2004: Guys and Balls
- 2006: Helen, Fred und Ted (TV film)
- 2006–2007: Der Kriminalist (TV series)
  - Am Abgrund (2006)
  - Mördergroupie (2006)
  - Totgeschwiegen (2007)
- 2009: Desert Flower
- 2012: The Pursuit of Unhappiness
- 2013: 3096 Days
- 2016: Tödliche Geheimnisse (TV film)
- 2019: A Regular Woman
- 2025: Fall for me
