= Desert Flower (film) =

- Film poster
- Directed by: Sherry Hormann
- Written by: Waris Dirie (book); Sherry Hormann; Smita Bhide
- Screenplay by: Sherry Hormann (screenwriter); Smita Bhide (script revision)
- Produced by: Peter Hermann Desert Flower Filmproductions; Dor Film Majestic Filmproduktion BSI International Invest Bac Films
- Starring: Liya Kebede; Sally Hawkins; Craig Parkinson
- Cinematography: Ken Kelsch
- Edited by: Clara Fabry
- Music by: Martin Todsharow
- Release dates: 5 September 2009 (Venice Film Festival); 24 September 2009 (Germany)
- Running time: 124 minutes
- Country: Germany
- Languages: English; Somali
- Box office: $14,631,377

Desert Flower is a 2009 biographical film directed by Sherry Hormann. It stars Liya Kebede, Sally Hawkins and Craig Parkinson, and is based on the Somali-born model Waris Dirie's autobiography.

== Plot ==
The film follows the journey of Waris Dirie (played by Liya Kebede) from a nomadic pastoralist background in Somalia to a new life and career in the West as a fashion model and activist against female genital mutilation.

== Cast ==
- Liya Kebede as Waris Dirie
- Sally Hawkins as Marylin
- Craig Parkinson as Neil
- Meera Syal as Pushpa Patel
- Anthony Mackie as Harold Jackson
- Juliet Stevenson as Lucinda
- Timothy Spall as Terry Donaldson
- Soraya Omar-Scego as Waris aged 12
- Teresa Churcher as Nurse Anne
- Eckart Friz as Spike
- Prashant Prabhakar as Kami
- Anna Hilgedieck as Tilda
- Matt Kaufman as Burger Bar Manager
- Emma Kay as Immigration officer
- Elli as European Man
- Nick Raio as Truck Driver
- Robert Robalino as Cafe owner
- Chris Wilson as Embassy Official
- Safa Idriss Nour as Little Waris

== Production ==
Asked about the scene where Waris Dirie really struggles with a nude photo shoot, Liya Kebede said, "Being nude really is a problem for me, so it was actually the easiest scene for me to shoot. I definitely identified with how she was feeling."

== Awards ==
- Festival de San Sebastián 2009
