= Antoine Monot Jr. =

Swiss-German actor and film producer

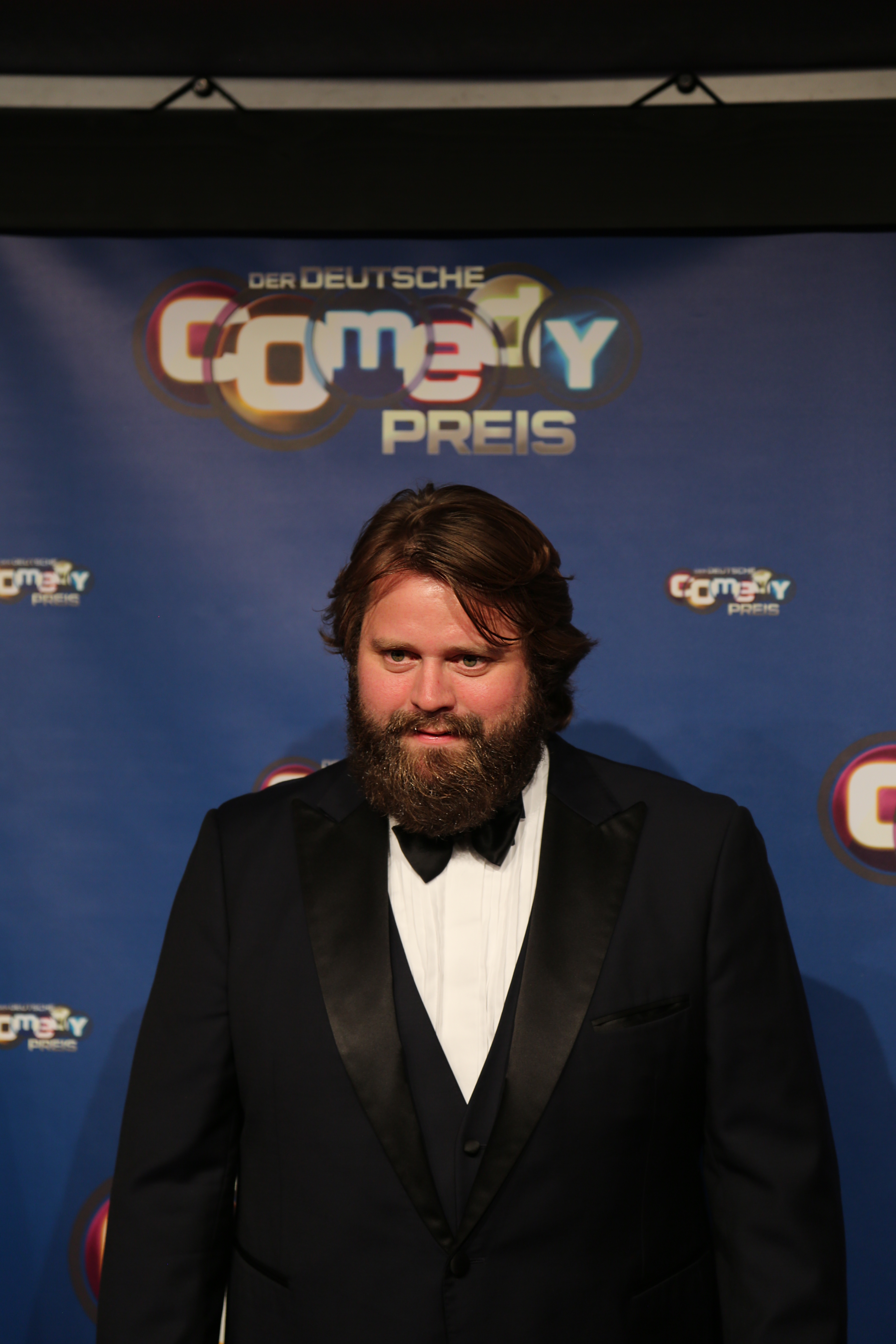
Monot at the Deutscher Comedypreis 2017

Antoine Monot Jr. (German: [anˈtwaːn moˈnoː]; born 22 June 1975 in Rheinbach, West Germany) is a Swiss-German actor and film producer with both German and Swiss citizenship. He had his breakthrough with the film Absolute Giganten in 1999 and became known to a wider audience especially through his work as a testimonial for technical trade chain Saturn. Since 2014, he has appeared as an advocate in the relaunch of the TV series Ein Fall für zwei.

== Life ==
=== Childhood ===
Monot was born in Rheinbach, Germany, as the son of composer and conductor Jean-François Monot and actress Gisela Monot. Due to his parents’ professional lives, the family moved places on a number of occasions before he was seven years old. His mother then took up a job as a teacher at the Rudolf Steiner boarding school Loheland near Fulda and Monot visited the school until he was 14, before first moving to Hochstadt where he attended the Free Rudolf Steiner school in Frankfurt am Main and then to Unterägeri near Zug in Switzerland.

Monot has two sisters, Elise Hofner and Jeanne Monot.

=== Acting career ===
At the age of nearly 16, Monot left school to study directing at the Zurich University of the Arts. During his final school days, he was cast for the film Jazz (1994). The film was directed by Daniel Helfer in Zurich and Wuppertal. After that, Monot exclusively acted on theatre stages until 1996 – at first in the independent scene under the directorship of Volker Lösch, who had left the ensemble of the Theater am Neumarkt Zurich in order to make his director’s debut with Gerettet in 1994. The two Lösch productions Vatermord and Der große B also featured Monot. After that, well-established theatres took notice of Monot and he played at the Schauspielhaus Zürich (Der Krüppel von Inishmaan), the Theater am Neumarkt Zürich (Raststätte oder Sie machens alle) and at the Theater Basel, among others. In 1996, Monot, who until this point had exclusively acted on theatre stages in Switzerland, attempted to make inroads into the German film and television market. His first roles were appearances in episodes of the German TV productions SK-Babies and as a patient in Alphateam. In 1997, he was invited to the casting for the German film Absolute Giganten, which was to be young actor Sebastian Schipper’s debut as director. With Stefan Arndt and Tom Tykwer, he also found two producers to help get the movie off the ground with their film company X-Filme Creative Pool. The casting process took more than a year, and after the second round in spring 1998, Monot was accepted to play the role of “Walter” alongside Frank Giering, Florian Lukas and Julia Hummer. Shooting commenced in Hamburg on 10 August 1998, and this film is considered to be his breakthrough.

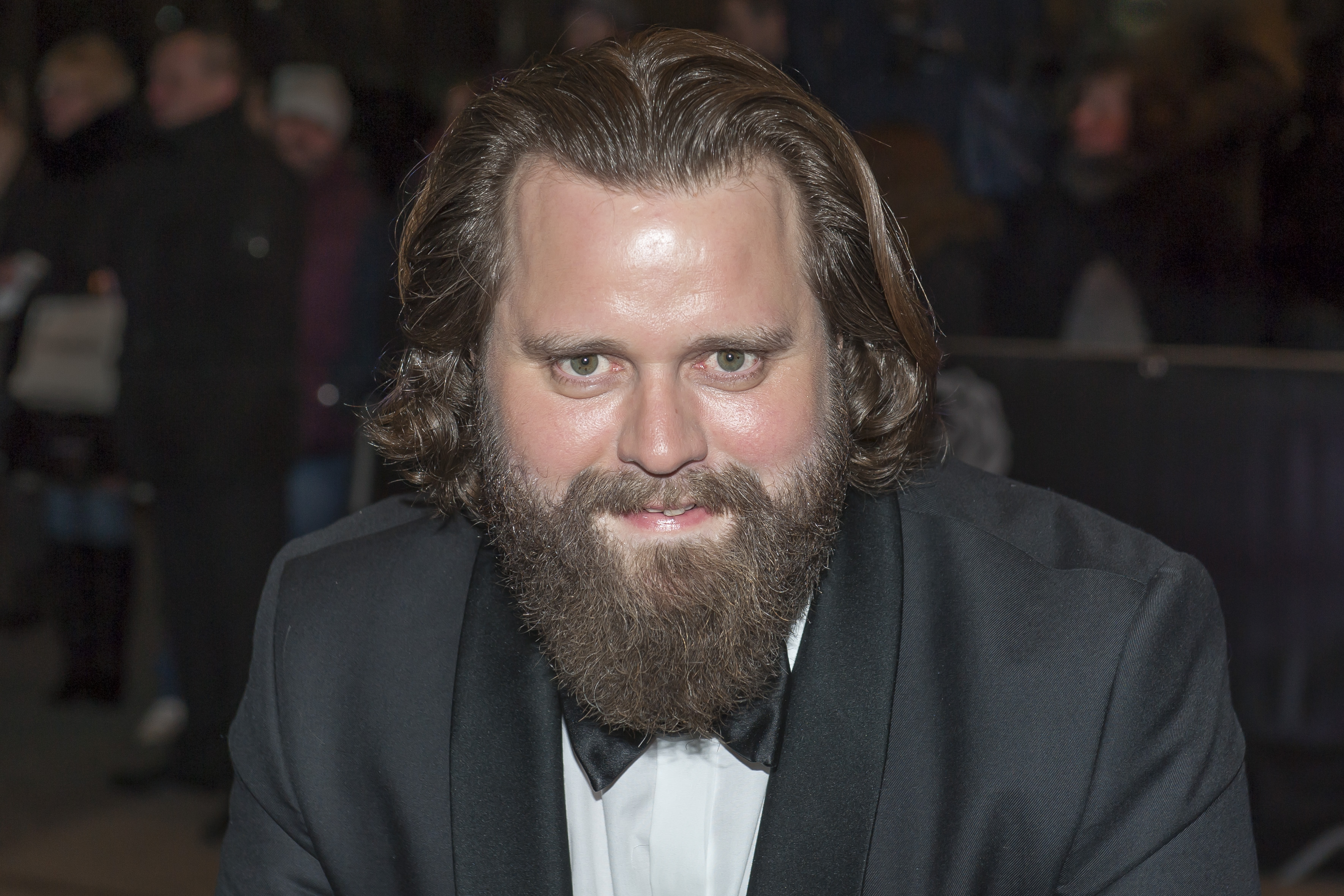
Monot in 2015

Further TV and cinema productions followed, such as Oliver Hirschbiegel’s Das Experiment (2001), Christian Zübert's Lammbock (2001), and Robert Schwentke’s Eierdiebe (2003). On the small screen, he was to be seen in Hat er Arbeit? by Kai Wessel as well as in Wolfsheim by Nicole Weegmann. In 2004, he made Der Wixxer (English: The Trixxer) in Prague, together with Bastian Pastewka, Oliver Kalkofe, Olli Dittrich, Anke Engelke and Christoph Maria Herbst. In 2005, he starred as “Moemme Bief” in Till Franzen’s film debut A Quiet Love at the side of Hanna Schygulla and Dominique Horwitz. In 2006, he was to be seen in the comedy Heavyweights by Marcus H. Rosenmüller. The film Resturlaub followed in 2011, based on a novel by Tommy Jaud.

Since 2013, Monot has portrayed the mostly silent salesman “Tech-Nick” in an advertising campaign for the consumer electronics retail chain Saturn

On 6 September 2014 the thriller Who Am I had its world premiere at the Toronto International Film Festival. Since 2014, Monot has played the advocate Benjamin “Benni” Hornberg in the TV series Ein Fall für zwei together with Wanja Mues. Monot also acted as Gian in the film Der Kreis (English: The Circle).

In 2015, he took a lead role in the crime series Tatort (episode: Ihr werdet gerichtet), which the broadcasting company SRF produced in Swiss German. For broadcasts by ARF and ORF on German and Austrian televisions, his role was subsequently dubbed into High German. Monot received the Schweizer Fernsehfilmpreis at the Solothurn Film Festival on 24 January 2016 for his portrayal of the perpetrator.

=== Business career ===
In 1998, Monot founded Creative Artists Management PLC in the course of which he represented actors and actresses from the German-speaking film industry, at first actively as an agent, and then as a consultant to the company from 2000. Creative Artists Management was dissolved in 2005.

On 18 August 2004 Monot founded TYPO3forum.net, a website devoted to the Content Management System (CMS) TYPO3. With 150,000 visitors per month (as of August 2010), it is one of the largest TYPO3-related communities. He stood down as the forum’s director in 2013.

In early 2005, he founded the annual Zurich Film Festival together with Karl Spoerri and Nadja Schildknecht, and was its artistic director until 2009. From 2008 until 2009, Monot was in charge of film production at Condor Films. He founded Zuckerfilm Limited, headquartered at the Bavaria Film studios in Grünwald near Munich, together with director Daniel Krauss and Franz Meiller in 2009. The first joint production Wo es weh tut was filmed in Mombasa, Kenia, in 2009/2010. The second feature film, the comedy Kaiserschmarrn, was shot by the Wörthersee lake, Austria, and in Munich, Germany, from 20 September to 31 October 2010. The first documentary film to be produced by Zuckerfilm was Scissors&Glue in 2011, which was directed by Helmut Schuster. The film was screened at the FLIFF Festival in Fort Lauderdale, USA.

The Deutscher Schauspielerpreis (German actor awards), awarded for the first time in 2012, started life as an initiative by Monot from the year 2010. It has since been awarded annually by the Bundesverband der Film- und Fernsehschauspieler (Federal Association of Film and TV Actors) in six categories. At the first awards, he hosted the evening together with Stefanie Sick and was a member of the jury. Prior to this, Monot had also moderated a large number of events and panel discussions at the Zurich Film Festival. He has also, on several occasions, hosted the Night of the Nominees during which the nominees of the Swiss film prize Quartz are announced each year at the Solothurn Film Festival.

=== Commitments ===
Monot is the deputy CEO of the Bundesverband Schauspiel (Federal Association of Acting, BFFS) and is responsible for marketing. He is also a member of the German Film Academy as well as the European Film Academy.

Since 2012, Monot has, together with Heinz Badewitz, hosted the Berlinale section LOLA@Berlinale, which has managed the International Film Festival Berlin, the German Film Academy and German Films since 2010. The programme of this series consists of films that were preselected by the commissions of the German Film Academy (feature film, documentary film and children’s film) to be nominated for the German Film Awards.

=== Personal life ===
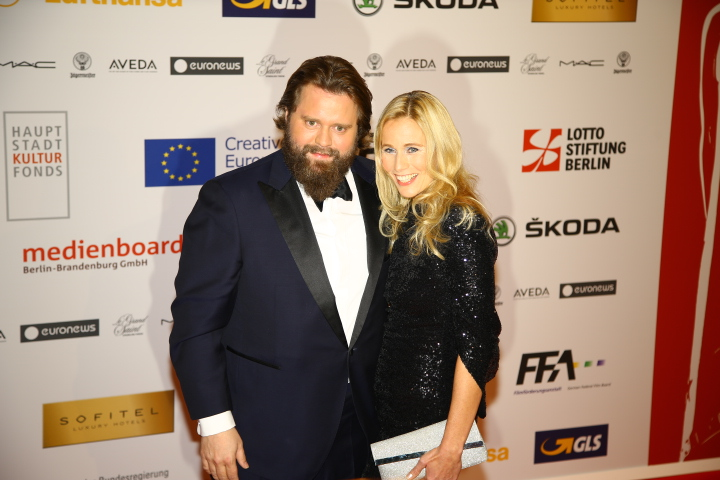
Monot with Stefanie Sick at the European Film Awards 2015

Monot lives with the journalist and HSE24 host Stefanie Sick and her three daughters in Munich. They were friends for 17 years prior to their relationship, and first met during shooting for the ARD sitcom Biggi in May 1998.

Monot’s first book Vertrauen Sie mir, ich tu's ja auch!, which he wrote together with David Denk, was published in 2015.

== Filmography ==
=== Cinema (selection) ===
- 1994: Jazz
- 1999: The Devil and Ms. D
- 1999: Absolute Giganten
- 2001: Das Experiment
- 2001: Lammbock
- 2002: More Ants in the Pants
- 2003: Eierdiebe (The Family Jewels in the U.S.)
- 2004: The Trixxer
- 2005: A Quiet Love
- 2006: Heavyweights
- 2007: Bis zum Ellenbogen
- 2009: Eden Is West
- 2009: Men in the City
- 2009: Stationspiraten
- 2010: Slowplay
- 2010: Henri 4
- 2010: The Day of the Cat
- 2011: Resturlaub
- 2011: Almanya: Welcome to Germany
- 2011: What a Man
- 2011: Vicky and the Treasure of the Gods
- 2012: Guardians
- 2013: Kaiserschmarrn
- 2014: Who Am I
- 2014: The Circle
- 2014: Lola auf der Erbse
- 2019: TKKG

=== Television (selection) ===
- 1995: Tatort: "Rückfällig"
- 2000: Wolfsheim
- 2000: Hat er Arbeit?
- 2002: Die Rosenheim-Cops: "Im Auftrag seiner Majestät"
- 2002: Alles getürkt!
- 2004: The School Trip
- 2008: Tatort: "Der tote Chinese"
- 2008: Brüderchen und Schwesterchen
- 2009: Polizeiruf 110: "Die Lücke, die der Teufel lässt"
- 2010: Tatort: "Absturz"
- 2011: Rookie – Fast platt
- 2011: Hindenburg
- 2011: Tatort: "Das Dorf"
- 2012: Stolberg: "Trance"
- 2013: Tatort: "Puppenspieler"
- 2013: Alarm für Cobra 11 – Die Autobahnpolizei: "Katerstimmung"
- 2013: Tatort: "Er wird töten"
- 2013: Die Chefin – Versprochen
- 2014: Das Glück der Anderen
- since 2014: Ein Fall für zwei
- 2014: Jetzt ist Sense – Der Tod gehört zum Leben einfach dazu
- 2014: Alles ist Liebe
- 2014: Die Lichtenbergs
- 2015: Letter to My Life
- 2015: Reiff für die Insel – Katharina und der Schäfer
- 2015: Tatort: "Ihr werdet gerichtet"
- 2015: Lerchenberg
- 2015: Die Kanzlei
- since 2015: Sketch History
- 2016: Prankenstein
- 2016: Pregau – Kein Weg zurück
- 2017: Knallerkerle

=== As a producer ===
- 2000: Timing (short film)
- 2009: Traum im Herbst
- 2010: Wo es weh tut
- 2011: Scissors & Glue: The Miami Project
- 2013: Kaiserschmarrn
- 2017: Knallerkerle

=== As a director ===
- 2017: Knallerkerle
