= Lucas Gregorowicz =

German-Polish actor (born 1976)

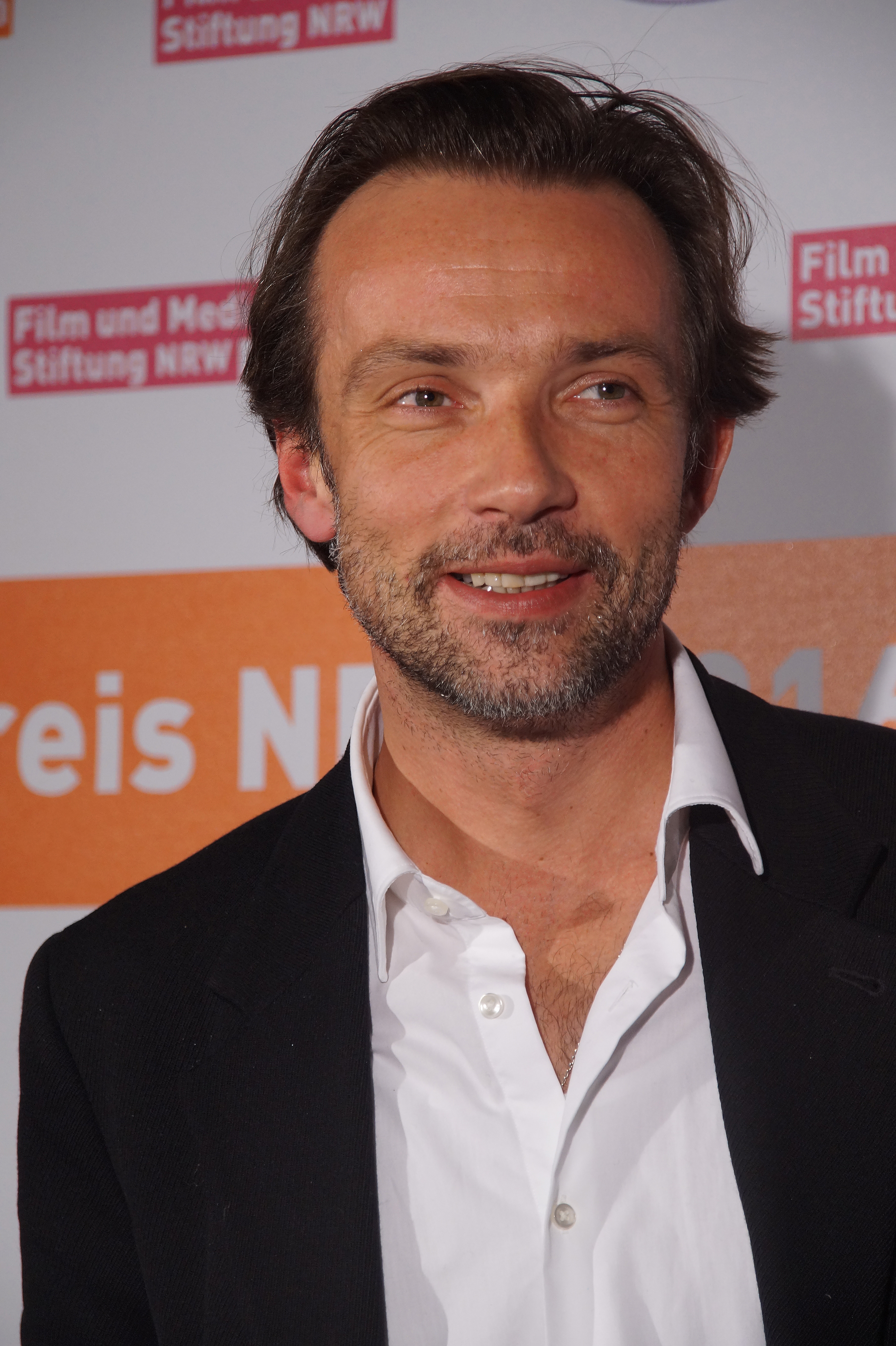
Gregorowicz at the NRW Kinoprogram prize in 2016

Lucas Gregorowicz (born 31 August 1976 in London) is a German-Polish actor.

== Life and work ==
Gregorowicz was born in London. He lived in Bydgoszcz (Poland) for ten years before his family moved to Bochum, where he studied at the Schauspielschule Bochum from 1996 to 2000. From 1997 he had an engagement at the Schauspielhaus Bochum, and in 1999, he acted under the direction of Leander Haußmann in Shakespeare's Much Ado About Nothing and in 2004, under the direction of Matthias Hartmann, "1979" by Christian Kracht. After a few appearances in television series like Die Motorrad-Cops – Hart am Limit, Die Wache and Adelheid und ihre Mörder, his cinematic debut was alongside Moritz Bleibtreu in Christian Zübert's Lammbock. He also took on roles in Fatih Akin's Solino, as well as in Vivian Naefe's So schnell du kannst and Sönke Wortmann's The Miracle of Bern. In Cattolica by Rudolph Jula, Gregorowicz plays the hedonistic Stefan, whose life is suddenly changed by his encounter with a stranger.

He continues to act in TV productions, such as the ARD series Vier gegen Z as Jona from 2004 to 2006, and on the ZDF series Sterne über Madeira. In 2013, he played in Generation War as a partisan leader where he mainly spoke Polish. Since 2015, he has been the police chief Adam Raczek in Polizeiruf 110 for Rundfunk Berlin-Brandenburg.

He also is a musician and is a guitarist with the Bad Boy Boogiez.

He is married to the German film and theater actress Adina Vetter and lives in Vienna. By 2016, they had planned to move to Berlin.

== Theatre roles ==
- 1997–2005: Management at the Schauspielhaus Bochum
- 2005: Management at the Schauspielhaus Zürich
- 2005–2006: Management at the Theater am Kurfürstendamm, Berlin
- 2007: Schauspiel Köln
- 2010: Management at the Burgtheater, Vienna
- 2011–2016: Engagement at the Burgtheater, Vienna

== TV shows ==
- 1997: It Happened in Broad Daylight – Director: Nico Hofmann
- 1999: Adelheid und ihre Mörder (TV series, episode Ein paar Volt zuviel)
- 2000: Die Wache (TV series, episode Golden Delicious)
- 2000: Die Motorrad-Cops – Hart am Limit (TV series, episode Amok)
- 2002: SK Kölsch (TV series, episode Gefallene Engel)
- 2002: So schnell du kannst
- 2003: Verrückt ist auch normal
- 2003: The Miracle of Bern
- 2004: Sterne über Madeira
- 2004: Stubbe – Von Fall zu Fall (TV series, Tödliches Schweigen)
- 2004: A Pass from the Back
- 2005–2007: Vier gegen Z (TV series, 40 episodes)
- 2005: Gegen jedes Risiko
- 2005: Utta Danella (TV series, Eine Liebe in Venedig)
- 2005: Mutig in die neuen Zeiten – Im Reich der Reblaus
- 2006: The Shell Seekers (TV miniseries)
- 2006: Mutig in die neuen Zeiten – Nur keine Wellen
- 2006: Teufelsbraten (TV series, 2 episodes)
- 2006: Vater Undercover – Im Auftrag der Familie
- 2007: Alma ermittelt – Tango und Tod
- 2007: Notruf Hafenkante (TV series, Liebeswahn)
- 2007: Lutter (TV series, Essen is fertig)
- 2007: Lutter (TV series, Um jeden Preis)
- 2007: Stolberg (TV series, Der Sonnenkönig)
- 2007: Oh Tannenbaum
- 2008: The Wall: The Final Days
- 2009: Tatort – Schweinegeld
- 2010: Invisible Touch
- 2010: Liebe und andere Delikatessen
- 2010: KDD – Kriminaldauerdienst (TV series, 2 episodes)
- 2011: Nina sieht es ...!!!
- 2011: The Promise (TV series, 4 episodes)
- 2013: Generation War (TV series, 2 episodes)
- 2014: Die Pilgerin (TV film, 2 episodes)
- 2014: Schmidt – Chaos auf Rezept (TV series, 8 episodes)
- 2014: Zorn – Tod und Regen
- 2015–2016: Vorstadtweiber (TV series, 20 episodes)
- 2015: Der Kriminalist (TV series, Treu bis in den Tod)
- 2015: Polizeiruf 110 – Grenzgänger
- 2016: Polizeiruf 110 – Der Preis der Freiheit
- 2016: Stralsund (TV series, Schutzlos)
- 2016: Stralsund (TV series, Vergeltung)
- 2019: Der Pass (TV series)

== Movies ==
- 2001: Lammbock
- 2001: Herz
- 2001: Solino
- 2002: Cattolica
- 2003: The Miracle of Bern
- 2003: Sugar Orange
- 2006: Goldene Zeiten
- 2008: Hardcover
- 2008: Chiko
- 2009: Soul Kitchen
- 2010: Hochzeitspolka
- 2016: Scrappin'
- 2017: Lommbock
- 2017: Sommerfest

== Awards ==
- 2003: DIVA – Deutscher Entertainment Preis
