= Özay Fecht =

Turkish-German actress and jazz singer

- Born: 1953 (age 72–73); Istanbul, Turkey
- Years active: 1985-present

Özay Fecht (born 1953) is a Turkish-German actress and jazz singer. She was born in Istanbul and went to Germany when she was eighteen and found success.

== Filmography ==
Film
Year	Film	Role	Notes
2016	Ahlat Ağacı	Granma	
2012	Particle		
2011	Dreiviertelmond	Nezahat	
2010	Gurbet – Fremder		
2007	Janjan	Fadime	
2006	The Stoning	Azimi - Sarah	
2005	Brudermord		
2004	Kismet	Sübeyla	
2000	Tour Abroad		
2000	Kanak Attack	Frau Ongun	
2000	Der Ausbruch	Mutter	
1999	Yara	Mother	
1999	Weites Meer	Mutter	
1998	Me Boss, You Sneakers!	Nani	
1996	Kriegsbilder		
1993	Mavi Surgun		
1992	Happy Birthday, Turk!	Ilter Hamul	
1991	Pizza Colonia	Ayshe Lochner	
1989	The Rose Garden	Mrs. Marques	
1989	Jenseits von Blau	Singer	
1987	Aufbrüche		
1986	40 Quadratmeter Deutschland	Turna	
1985	Abschied in Berlin	Sängerin	

=== Television ===
Year	Film	Role	Notes
2009	Lasko – Die Faust Gottes	Fatma	1 episode
2009	Liebe verlernt man nicht	Sema	
2007	Karayilan		
2007	KDD – Kriminaldauerdienst	Frau Kilic	1 episode
2006	Bis in die Spitzen	Ayzat	1 episode
2005	Abschnitt 40	Frau Al-Hariri	1 episode
2004	Eva Blond		
2003	Kasabanin incisi		
2002	Denninger – Der Mallorcakrimi	Maria	
2001	Denninger – Der Mann mit den zwei Gesichtern	Maria	
2001	Denninger – Der Tod des Paparazzo	Maria	
1998	Ärzte	Mrs. Yilmaz	1 episode
1996-98	Tatort	Frau Altun	2 episodes
1996	Alles wegen Robert De Niro	Frau Baysal	
1996	Die Drei		1 episode
1995-96	Wolffs Revier	Frau Incegül	2 episodes
1996	Mona M. – Mit den Waffen einer Frau	Elefteria	1 episode
1994-95	Frauenarzt Dr. Markus Merthin	Fatma Yüksol	4 episodes
1993	Der Fahnder		

== Music ==
In the 1990s, she played in a group with Steve Lacy and John Betsch.

=== Discography ===
- 1985: No More
- 1988: Moves with Doug Hammond
- 1995: Antiquated Love
