= Lommbock =

2017 German comedy movie

- Film poster
- Directed by: Christian Zübert
- Produced by: Ulf Israel; Tom Spiess; Sönke Wortmann
- Starring: Lucas Gregorowicz; Moritz Bleibtreu
- Distributed by: Wild Bunch
- Release date: 23 March 2017
- Running time: 91 minutes
- Country: Germany
- Language: German

Lommbock is a 2017 German comedy film directed by Christian Zübert. It is a sequel to the 2001 film Lammbock.

== Cast ==
- Lucas Gregorowicz - Stefan Becker
- Moritz Bleibtreu - Kai
- Louis Hofmann - Jonathan
- Mavie Hörbiger - Sabine
- Alexandra Neldel - Jenny
- Melanie Winiger - Yasemin
- Wotan Wilke Möhring - Frank
- Antoine Monot, Jr. - Schöngeist
- Dar Salim - 10 Jahre Bau
- Elmar Wepper - Vater Becker
