= Wotan Wilke Möhring =

German actor

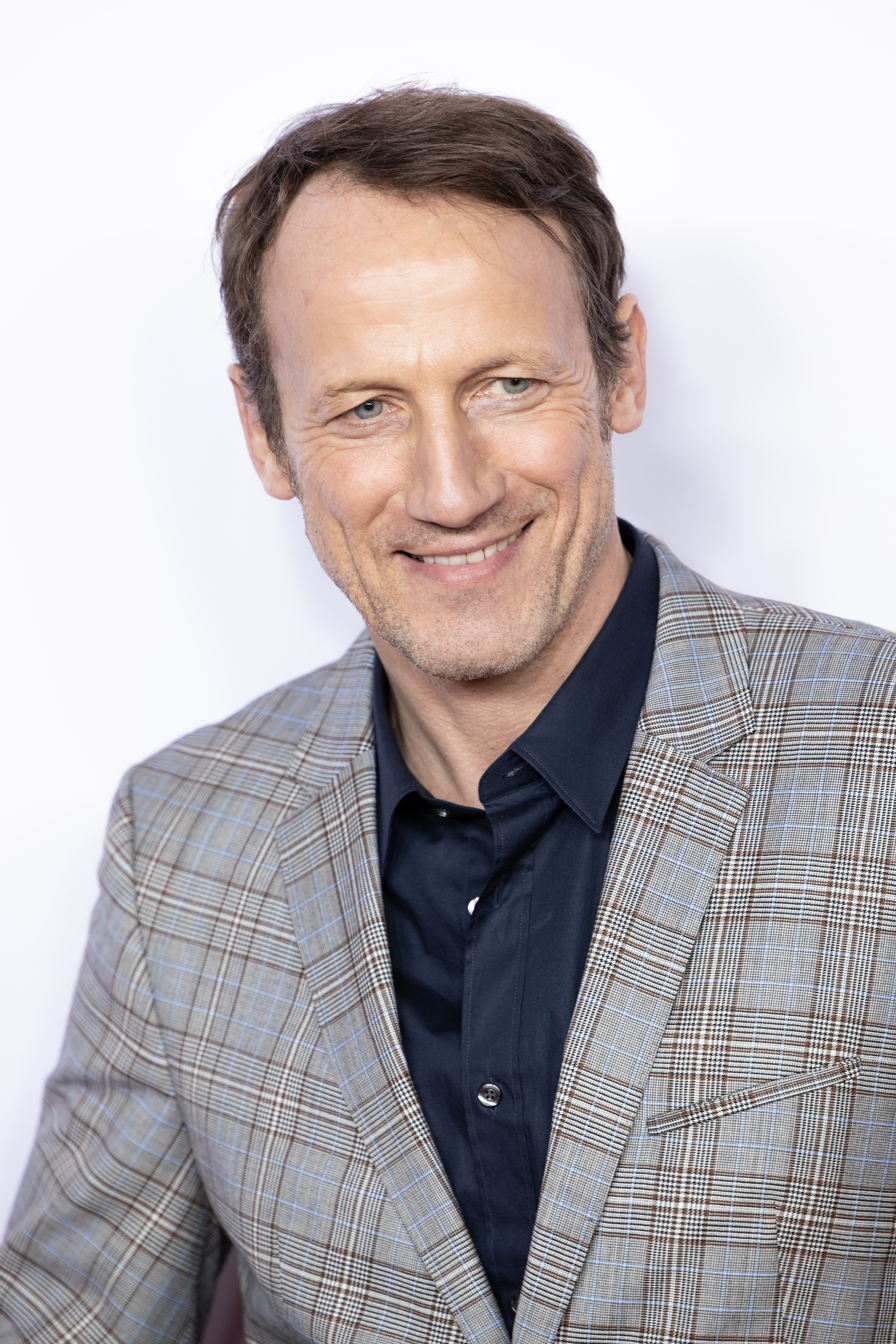
- Möhring 2020
- Born: 23 May 1967 (age 58); Augustdorf, West Germany
- Occupation: Actor
- Years active: 1998–present
- Relatives: Sönke Möhring (brother)
- Website: wotanwilkemoehring.de

Wotan Wilke Möhring (born 23 May 1967) is a German actor.

== Biography ==
Möhring was born in Augustdorf near Detmold and grew up in Herne. His father was an army officer and his mother worked as a teacher. He has a sister and two brothers. One of them, Sönke Möhring, is also an actor.

After receiving a Waldorf education in Herne and finishing high school with the Abitur diploma, Möhring took vocational training to become an electrician, but then worked as a club owner, doorman, and model. He studied communication at the Berlin University of the Arts, joined actors workshops in Cologne and Los Angeles, and lived for two years in New York City. He was also an army officer for two years.

Together with Gabi Delgado-López, Möhring founded the band DAF/DOS. Furthermore, he has produced soundtracks.

Möhring had his first screen appearance in the 1998 television film The Bubi Scholz Story, a bio-pic about a German boxer, which also featured Benno Fürmann and Götz George. Since then he has played in over 90 German film and television productions and has received numerous prizes, including the German Television Prize as Best Actor in 2012. He starred in the German film The Last Fine Day which was awarded a Grimme Prize in 2013. He played the lead role in a short film directed by Max Zähle, which won a Student Academy Award in 2011 and was nominated for an Oscar in 2012. He had a small role in the international film production of 2008 titled Valkyrie about the plot to assassinate Hitler on 20 July 1944.

Since 2013, Möhring has played the detective Thorsten Falke in seventeen episodes as of June 2022 of the long-running crime television series Tatort, after previously playing guest roles four times in the series.

In 2016, he played the part of Old Shatterhand, the blood brother of Winnetou, in the German film production Winnetou based on three novels by Karl May.

Möhring plays the main character, Ludvig Licht, in the 2018 Swedish television thriller series West of Liberty, based on the novel by Thomas Engstrom.

== Filmography (selection) ==
- 1998: The Bubi Scholz Story (TV film)
- 1999: Zoe – Ted
- 1999: Bang Boom Bang – Fußballspieler – Kellerbar (scenes deleted)
- 1999: St. Pauli Night
- 2000: 8 Grad Celsius – Mark
- 2000: Otto – Der Katastrofenfilm – Brock
- 2000: Mind Hunter (TV film) – Nikolaus Kolvin
- 2000: Hat er Arbeit? (TV film) – Karl Hansen
- 2001: Das Experiment – Joe Maier Nr. 69
- 2001: A Goddamn Job – Gangster
- 2001: Lammbock – Frank
- 2001: Julietta – Castor
- 2001: Schwarz & McMurphy (TV film) – Schwarz
- 2002: Olgas Sommer – Paul
- 2002: Himmelreich auf Erden (TV film) – Roland
- 2002: La mer
- 2002: Final Hope (TV film)
- 2003: Anatomy 2 – Gregor
- 2003: Eierdiebe – Martin Schwarz
- 2003: Echte Männer? (TV film) – Mike Krieger
- 2003: Tage des Sturms (TV film) – Hartmut Brücken
- 2004: Die Konferenz (TV film) – Karsten Graf
- 2004: Zwischen Liebe und Tod (TV film) – Max
- 2004: Cowgirl – Max
- 2005: A Witch's Kiss (TV film) – Harry Tänzel
- 2005: Antibodies – Michael Martens
- 2005: Almost Heaven – Carlo
- 2005: Der Schatz der weißen Falken – Jan (35)
- 2005: Secret Love: The Schoolboy and the Mailwoman (TV film) – Peter Wörner
- 2006: Goldene Zeiten – Ingo Schmitz
- 2006: Erased (TV film) – Noah Becker
- 2006: Freundinnen fürs Leben (TV film) – Meier
- 2006: Nothing but Ghosts – Jonas
- 2006: Bettis Bescherung (TV film) – Fabian Fuchs
- 2007: Video Kings – Horst
- 2007: Counterparts – Michael Gleiwitz
- 2007: Kuckuckszeit (TV film) – Jens
- 2007: Copacabana (TV film) – Harald
- 2007: Tour Excess – Johannes
- 2008: Hardcover – Dominik 'Nick' 'Dom' Adler
- 2008: KDD – Kriminaldauerdienst (TV series) – Fred Steiner
- 2008: Ein riskantes Spiel (TV film) – Andreas
- 2008: Leo and Marie (TV film) – Leo Schreiber
- 2008: At Any Second – Christoph Zach
- 2008: Valkyrie – Sergeant Kolbe
- 2009: The Wild Chicks and Life – Torte's Father
- 2009: Kinder des Sturms (TV film) – Harald Bergmann
- 2009: Soul Kitchen – Thomas Neumann
- 2009: Pandorum – Young Bower's Father
- 2009: Men in the City – Roland Feldberg
- 2010: Wie Matrosen – Dennis Koch
- 2010: Henri 4 – Henri de Guise
- 2010: The Silence – Timo Friedrich
- 2011: The Fire – Ralph Nester
- 2011: Gegengerade – Fan Steiger
- 2011: Raju (short) – Jan
- 2011: Hindenburg: The Last Flight (TV film) – Karl Erdmann
- 2011: Black Brown White – Doc
- 2011: Homevideo (TV film) – Claas Moormann
- 2011: Men in the City 2 – Roland Feldberg
- 2011: The Last Fine Day (TV film) – Lars Langhoff
- 2012: Elmo: Wort des Tages – Wotan
- 2012: Life Is Not for Cowards – Markus
- 2012: Men Do What They Can – Paul Schuberth
- 2013: Hotel Adlon: A Family Saga (TV miniseries) – Friedrich Loewe
- 2013: Tatort – Feuerteufel (TV series) – Thorsten Falke
- 2014: Tatort – Kaltstart (TV series) – Thorsten Falke
- 2014: Better Than Nothing – Carsten Rasmus
- 2014: Who Am I – No System is Safe – Stephan
- 2014: Everything Is Love – Hannes
- 2015: Men Have to Go through This – Paul
- 2015: Stroppy Cow, Stubborn Ram – Jakob
- 2016: Sex & Crime – Valentin
- 2016: Seitenwechsel – Alex Paschke
- 2016: Unsere Zeit ist jetzt – Basti
- 2016: Winnetou – Old Shatterhand
- 2017: Lommbock – Frank
- 2017: Happy Burnout – Fussel Poschka
- 2018: Don't. Get. Out! – Karl Brendt
- 2018: Parfum – Prosecutor Grünberg

== Awards and nominations ==
- Hat er Arbeit? (2000)
  - 2002: German Television Award nomination for Best Actor
- Liebe und Verrat (2002)
  - 2002: German Television Award nomination for Best Actor
- Antikörper (2005)
  - 2005: Málaga Spanish Film Festival Award for Best Actor
- The Fire (2011)
  - 2011: Thessaloniki Film Festival Award for Best Actor
- Homevideo (2011)
  - 2011: German Television Award
- The Last Fine Day (2011)
  - 2012: German Television Award for Best Actor
  - 2013: Grimme Award
- Winnetou (2016)
  - 2017 Goldene Kamera Award for Best German Actor
