= Jan Wagner =

Jan Wagner may refer to:

- Jan Wagner (poet) (born 1971), German poet, essayist and translator, recipient of the Georg Büchner Prize
- Jan Costin Wagner (born 1972), German crime fiction writer
- Jan Wagner (conductor), Venezuelan conductor with the Odense Symphony Orchestra
