= One Breath =

One Breath may refer to:

- One Breath (album), Anna Calvi, 2013
- "One Breath" (The X-Files), 1994
- One Breath (2015 film), German drama
- One Breath (2020 film), Russian sport drama
