= Cherry Blossoms (film) =

- German promotional poster
- Directed by: Doris Dörrie
- Written by: Doris Dörrie
- Produced by: Harald Kügler; Bettina Reitz; Molly von Fürstenberg; Hubert von Spreti
- Starring: Elmar Wepper; Aya Irizuki; Hannelore Elsner; Maximilian Brückner; Nadja Uhl; Birgit Minichmayr
- Cinematography: Hanno Lentz
- Edited by: Frank J. Müller; Inez Regnier
- Music by: Claus Bantzer
- Production company: Olga Film GmbH
- Distributed by: Majestic-Filmverleih
- Release dates: 11 February 2008 (Berlin); 6 March 2008 (Germany)
- Country: Germany
- Languages: German; Japanese; English
- Box office: $12,861,502

Cherry Blossoms (German: Kirschblüten – Hanami) is a 2008 German drama film directed by Doris Dörrie. This film, starring Elmar Wepper, Hannelore Elsner and Aya Irizuki, tells the story of Rudi: terminally ill, he travels to Japan after the sudden death of his wife Trudi – in order to make up for missed opportunities in life.

== Plot ==
Trudi Angermeir, who dreams of visiting Japan with her husband Rudi, learns that he is terminally ill. Although distraught over the news, she decides against breaking it to him, and suggests they visit their youngest son Karl in Tokyo (which he refuses to), or at least their daughter and other son in Berlin, which he reluctantly agrees to.

Upon arrival from their Bavarian village, their oldest son Klaus brings them home where his wife Emma and children Celine and Robert, later joined by his sister Karolin, receive them unenthusiastically. After Trudi and Rudi have gone to bed on their first night, the other adults discuss their nuisance over the sudden visit and how neglected the two siblings felt while growing up compared to their younger brother.

The following morning, Karolin's girlfriend Franzi who seems to like the old couple better picks them up to show them around. Their daughter joins them later at her and Franzi's place, but soon tension arises and her parents leave back to Klaus's. They fail to purchase S-Bahn tickets and a frustrated Rudi snaps to Trudi, who suggests they go to the beach. The following evening, Trudi, Rudi, and Franzi attend a Butoh performance - Trudi and Franzi watch the show while a bored and frustrated Rudi waits outside.

The couple travel to a beach resort and spend a couple of days walking by the shore. On the third day, Rudi finds that Trudi has died in her sleep. He is joined by his children and their partners; Karl flies in from Tokyo. Behind Rudi's back, his family discusses his noticeable grief and struggle to cope. Rudi, distraught, gets back home and resents his new solitude. Trudi's ashes are buried in a ceremony which only Franzi and Rudi of all the family attend.

After some time, Rudi suddenly flies to Tokyo to visit Karl, who takes him in his small flat but has no time to show him around. Initially, Rudi stays home with little to do with his time, and takes a liking to wear Trudi's clothes to remember her the better. Soon he ventures outside and gets lost in the busy, vibrant Tokyo streets, but eventually gets to know some quiet spots while wearing Trudi's jumper and skirt underneath his coat to feel that he is showing Japan to her; one day he spots a young lady in a park dancing what appears to be Butoh. Karl grows increasingly annoyed because of him, as Rudi learns when he overhears a conversation with him and Klaus.

Soon afterwards, Rudi sees the dancing girl again and approaches her. She explains to him the nature of Butoh and they develop a friendship; he learns that she has been an orphan for one year and dances Butoh to cope with the loss of her mother. The girl, whose name is Yu, helps him get into the train back to Karl's, and over the following days they see each other every day, while Rudi starts to notice his health deteriorating. One day Yu tells him that she lives in a tent; moved, Rudi follows her as she goes back home and learns that she is homeless, so he takes her home much to Karl's irritation; hearing them argue while she is taking a shower, she discreetly leaves back to her tent.

The following morning, Rudi grabs his belongings and discreetly leaves. He asks Yu to join him to a trip to Mount Fuji to fulfil Trudi's dream and they take the train to a mountain resort. Yu explains that Mount Fuji is ‘very shy’ and remains veiled by the clouds most of the time, which they see for themselves upon arrival. They register in a ryokan and spend the following days waiting for the weather to improve, with Rudi's patience and health wearing out. One night he wakes up in fever; Yu looks after him and soothes him back to sleep. Before dawn, Rudi wakes up again and finds that the sky is clear and Mount Fuji perfectly visible. He puts on Trudi's kimono and paints his face, then rushes out to the lakeshore to dance in Butoh style; Trudi's spirit joins him and they both dance, before he collapses and dies. Shortly after Rudi's death, a deeply saddened Yu goes over his belongings and discovers an envelope in which he had left her all his savings. Karl arrives and he and Yu perform a traditional ceremony after Rudi's cremation to place his bones in an urn. They drive back to Tokyo and part outside Karl's building.

Back in their parents's home, Klaus, Karolin, and Karl grimly discuss both sudden deaths, to which Franzi states that ‘he probably was happy in the end.’ Yu, for her part, is seen back in the park under the cherry blossoms, dancing Butoh with Rudi's hat and other belongings.

== Cast ==
- Elmar Wepper as Rudi Angermeier
- Hannelore Elsner as Trudi Angermeier
- Aya Irizuki as Yu
- Nadja Uhl as Franzi
- Maximilian Brückner as Karl Angermeier
- Birgit Minichmayr as Karolin Angermeier
- Felix Eitner as Klaus Angermeier
- Floriane Daniel as Emma Angermeier
- Celine Tanneberger as Celine Angermeier
- Robert Döhlert as Robert Angermeier

== Reception ==
On review aggregator website Rotten Tomatoes, the film holds an approval rating of 79% based on 58 reviews, with an average rating of 7.0/10.
