= Michael Kamm =

- Born: September 10, 1978 (age 46); Regensburg, Bavaria, Germany
- Occupation(s): Composer, music producer
- Instruments: Piano, guitar, synthesizer
- Years active: 2005-present

Michael was born in Regensburg, moved to Augsburg during his childhood and began his musical career at the early age of six, when he was educated in a famous German boys' choir. As a teenager he was touring around with several Punk- and Rock-Bands, singing and playing guitar.

After many years with the critically acclaimed German Indie-Rock Band »Nova International«, Kamm and a former bandmate founded the Music Production Company »Pas de Deux« in 2005, composing and producing music for TV commercials for companies such as Coca-Cola, Fanta, Panasonic, ING-Diba just to name a few.

Besides that, Michael started producing albums for many artists working in a broad variety of musical genres.

Kamm studied music at the University of Augsburg and has earned a master's degree in both, classical Piano and Singing.

In 2010, he made his debut as a film score composer for the German drama The Silence, written and directed by Baran Bo Odar.

They continued their mutual collaboration in the following years, taking the step to Hollywood in 2015.

Michael Kamm lives in Augsburg.

== Selected filmography ==
Year	Title
2021	Prey
2017	Sleepless
2014	Who Am I - No System is Safe
2010	The Silence
