= Absolute Giganten =

1999 film

- DVD cover
- Directed by: Sebastian Schipper
- Written by: Sebastian Schipper
- Produced by: Stefan Arndt; Tom Tykwer
- Starring: Frank Giering; Florian Lukas
- Cinematography: Frank Griebe
- Edited by: Andrew Bird
- Music by: The Notwist, Sophia and others
- Production company: X Filme Creative Pool
- Distributed by: Senator Film
- Release date: 30 September 1999 (Germany)
- Running time: 80 minutes
- Country: Germany
- Language: German

Absolute Giganten is a 1999 German comedy drama film written and directed by Sebastian Schipper, produced by Stefan Arndt and Tom Tykwer. Set in Hamburg, it depicts how a group of young Germans react to the prospect of one of them leaving forever, and involves drinking, V8 engines, and an extraordinary game of table football.

It was Schipper's first movie as a director. In the year 2000 the movie won the German Film Award in the category Outstanding Feature Film.

== Cast ==
- Frank Giering as Floyd
- Florian Lukas as Ricco
- Antoine Monot, Jr. as Walter
- Julia Hummer as Telsa
- Jochen Nickel as Snake
- Albert Kitzl as Elvis
- Guido A. Schick as Dulle
- Silvana Bosi as Walter's Grandma

== Reception ==
The film was generally well-received by German critics. The American film critic Eric D. Snider wrote that the film "has the sort of world-weary, melancholy bleakness we've come to expect from that country, while at the same time infusing energy and vigor into filmmaking as an art form. This is a pitifully touching film, uplifting for its intrinsic beauty even while evoking sadness for the characters."
