= As Green as It Gets =

2018 film

As Green As It Gets
- Directed by: Florian Gallenberger
- Starring: Elmar Wepper; Emma Bading
- Release date: 23 June 2018 (SIFF)
- Running time: 116 minutes
- Country: Germany
- Language: German

As Green As It Gets (German: Grüner wird's nicht, sagte der Gärtner und flog davon) is a 2018 German comedy-drama film based on the eponymous novel by Jockel Tschiersch.

== Plot ==
Schorsch Kempter (Elmar Wepper) a grumpy gardener, takes his biplane and flies away from financial troubles. He meets Philomena (Emma Bading) and she joins him on a journey where both of them find their purpose in life.

== Cast ==
- Elmar Wepper - Schorsch Kempter
- Emma Bading - Philomena von Zeydlitz
- Monika Baumgartner - Monika Kempter
- Dagmar Manzel - Hannah
- Ulrich Tukur - Richard von Zeydlitz
- Sunnyi Melles - Evelyn von Zeydlitz
- Karolina Horster - Miriam Kempter
