= Lammbock =

2001 film by Christian Zübert

- Film poster
- Directed by: Christian Zübert
- Written by: Christian Zübert
- Produced by: Sönke Wortmann
- Starring: Moritz Bleibtreu; Lucas Gregorowicz; Marie Zielcke; Elmar Wepper; Alexandra Neldel
- Cinematography: Sonja Rome
- Edited by: Andrea Mertens
- Release date: 23 August 2001
- Running time: 93 minutes
- Country: Germany
- Language: German

Lammbock is a 2001 German stoner film. The protagonists are two pizza delivery owners who decide to up their income by adding marijuana to the menu and get into trouble after attracting the attention of an undercover cop. There are numerous subplots, and the movie is essentially divided into various chapters, each dealing with a different episode. It was filmed in and around the Franconian city of Würzburg and in Cologne, North Rhine-Westphalia.

== Plot ==
Kai and Stefan are two friends who own a gourmet pizza delivery business as a front for selling cannabis. Stefan is in the final stages of law school under the behest of his father, who is a judge. They visit their outdoor cannabis growing operation only to discover that aphids are destroying their plants. In a head shop they meet Achim, a stoner who says he knows how to get rid of aphids, handing them a tub full of Aphidoletes aphidimyza. However, Achim is an undercover police officer.

After much debate, the duo decide to bring Achim to the plantation to help with the aphid problem. His next idea is to use an adulterant on the plants called "Brain cell massacre," which he says is used on Kazakhstan plantations. On the way to the growing area, they try to pick some psychedelic mushrooms. They test them out on Achim while he is at the plantation, claiming that they already tried some. Achim is poisoned by the mushrooms and goes into a convulsive state, when they spot a hunter in the area. They lock up Achim in the trunk of their car, along with the hunter who discovered the cannabis plantation as well as the harvested crop.

After narrowly getting out of an unrelated traffic stop, the duo open up to Stefan's father and confess their situation. Though Stefan's father becomes upset, he calls the chief of police, whom he befriended when he was a public prosecutor. With the help of the chief of police, the duo get off the hook. Stefan takes his final exam only to walk out at the last minute to pursue his lifelong dream of owning a cafe on a beach.

== Cast ==
- Lucas Gregorowicz as Stefan Becker
- Moritz Bleibtreu as Kai
- Marie Zielcke as Laura Becker
- Julian Weigend as Achim
- Elmar Wepper as Vater Becker
- Alexandra Schalaudek as Gina
- Christof Wackernagel as Ausbilder Walter
- Antoine Monot, Jr. as Schöngeist
- Wotan Wilke Möhring as Frank
- Nils Brunkhorst as Dopex
- Alexandra Neldel as Jenny
- Christoph Künzler as Jäger
- Peter Fieseler as Tim
- Thomas Schende as Dr. Kollmann
- Anya Hoffmann as Elena Kollmann

== Trivia ==
- The director was heavily influenced by Quentin Tarantino and Kevin Smith. The characters Frank and Schöngeist bear a striking resemblance to Smith's duo Jay and Silent Bob.
- German soccer player Mehmet Scholl is repeatedly referenced in the movie's dialogue, on posters seen in the movie and as a player in a soccer video game that the two protagonists play.
- In the beginning of the film Stefan is shown driving on the historic bridge crossing the river Main) in Würzburg, even though it has long been pedestrianized.
- The pizzeria scenes were filmed in Cologne. The university scenes were shot at the Technical University of Cologne.

== Sequel ==
After asking followers of his Facebook page whether they wanted to see a sequel of the 2001 film and receiving strong approval, Bleibtreu announced the film Lommbock in November 2015. Filming began in August 2016, and Lommbock premiered in Germany 23 March 2017
