= Hardcover (film) =

- Directed by: Christian Zübert
- Starring: Wotan Wilke Möhring; Lucas Gregorowicz
- Production companies: Little Shark Entertainment; WDR; Arte; GFP
- Distributed by: Universum Film; Buena Vista International
- Release date: 3 April 2008
- Running time: 88 minutes
- Country: Germany
- Language: German

Hardcover is a 2008 German comedy film directed by Christian Zübert.

== Cast ==
- Wotan Wilke Möhring as Dominik 'Nick' 'Dom' Adler
- Lucas Gregorowicz as Christoph 'Goethe' Kreiss
- Justus von Dohnányi as Chico Waidner
- Anna Dereszowska as Ewa
- Lisa Potthoff as Sandy
- Charly Hübner as Klaus
- Filip Peeters as Kommissar Jürgens
- Sybille J. Schedwill as Chefin Autovermietung
- Eric Bouwer as Captain Cock
- Sebastian Kroehnert as Sir Fuckalot
- Daniel Flieger as Claus von Punani
- Ioan Gyuri Pascu as Thailand Emil
