= Julia Hummer =

German actress and singer

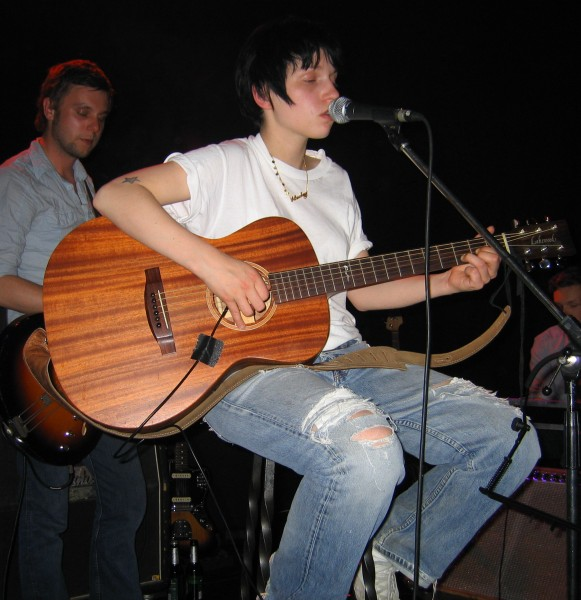
- Hummer in 2005
- Born: 24 April 1980 (age 46); Hagen, West Germany
- Occupation: Actress
- Years active: 1999-present

Julia Hummer (born 24 April 1980) is a German actress and singer. She has appeared in more than twenty films since her career began in 1999.

== Selected filmography ==
Year	Title	Role	Notes
1999	Absolute Giganten	Telsa	
2000	Crazy	Marie	
2000	The State I Am In	Jeanne	
2002	Weil ich gut bin!	Svetlana	TV film
2003	Eierdiebe	Susanne	
2003	Northern Star	Anke	
2005	Ghosts	Nina	
2010	Carlos	Gabriele Kröcher-Tiedemann	TV miniseries
2010	At Ellen's Age	Rebecca	
2014	Top Girl oder La déformation professionnelle	Helena	
