= Exterritorial =

2025 German film by Christian Zübert

- Release poster
- Directed by: Christian Zübert
- Written by: Christian Zübert
- Produced by: Kerstin Schmidbauer; Associate Producers: Götz Marx; Verena Vogl; Franziska Suppee
- Starring: Jeanne Goursaud; Dougray Scott; Lera Abova
- Cinematography: Matthias Pötsch
- Edited by: Ueli Christen
- Music by: Sara Barone
- Production companies: Constantin Film; EPO Film Productions
- Distributed by: Netflix
- Release date: 30 April 2025
- Running time: 109 minutes
- Country: Germany
- Languages: German; English

Exterritorial is a 2025 German action thriller film directed and written by Christian Zübert and starring Jeanne Goursaud, Dougray Scott, and Lera Abova. The film was released on Netflix on April 30, 2025. It is about a former special forces soldier with PTSD who is determined to find her young son after he mysteriously disappears inside the US Consulate in Germany.

The film received mixed reviews, and reached number one on the Netflix charts in 79 countries on May 2, 2025.

== Plot ==
Sara Wulf is a former Special Forces soldier who served in Afghanistan until 2017. She was the only survivor of an ambush in which eight soldiers were killed.

Sara and her young son Joshua (Josh) visit the U.S. Consulate in Frankfurt to apply for a work visa. During their lengthy stay, she leaves Josh in a playroom; when she returns, he is gone.

Sara asks Regional Security Officer Eric Kynch and Sergeant Donovan for help. According to Donovan, Sara entered the consulate alone and no child was checked in, and the surveillance footage also shows only Sara without her son.

Sara contacts the German police, but German authorities have no authority in American extraterritorial territory. Her mother, Anja, does not believe her either; she suspects that Sara has not taken her post-traumatic stress disorder (PTSD) pills. Sara is deemed to be having a psychiatric episode, and she is asked to leave the consulate.

Instead, Sara goes into hiding in the building and searches for Josh. There she meets Irina, who has been held captive at the consulate for almost two months. Irina offers to help her find Josh, in return for helping her to leave the consulate. Sara finds a bag of illegal drugs in an employee's locker at the consulate, so she suspects Josh may have been kidnapped because he witnessed the transaction.

After consulate security finds Sara, Kynch injects her with a sedative and she falls unconscious. When she wakes up, Consul General Deborah Allen is at her bedside. She was contacted by Sara's mother, who is concerned about Sara's PTSD and her delusions following her deployment to Afghanistan, during which Joshua's father was also killed.

Later, Sara is freed by Irina, whose real name is Kira Volkova. Her father was a Belarusian dissident and was killed by the Russian government. Kira fled to the US embassy in Minsk; the CIA had brought her to Frankfurt. Kira wants to go to Boston to see her mother, and from there, by sharing incriminating data about Russian crimes on a USB stick, she hopes to free other dissidents.

Sara has a job offer with a security firm in the US that is recruiting female ex-soldiers. She discovers that Kynch is behind the offer as a ruse to get her into the consulate and kidnap her, as he was also in Afghanistan.

Sara had received a video from a journalist showing Kynch meeting with a Taliban militant. According to the journalist, Kynch is corrupt and was responsible for tipping off the Taliban and enabling them to ambush Sara's group. Sara launches a diversion so Kira can escape to the US via France.

Kynch admits to Sara that he kidnapped Josh and tampered with the surveillance footage. As Sara was the last surviving witness to the Afghanistan incident, and Kynch felt threatened by the journalist's evidence, so his plan was to get Sara concerned about her son and let her run amok in the consulate so he could shoot her in self-defense.

Sara kidnaps Kynch's daughter Aileen and takes her to a safe room. She initially tries to trade her for Josh, but then changes her mind and releases her. Sara later secretly records Kynch's confession on Aileen's digital recorder. Kynch himself was a soldier and felt unsupported by the military in dealing with trauma, as well as financially disadvantaged. Therefore, he made a deal with the Taliban to sell information and improve his financial situation.

After Sara is shot and injured by Kynch, Josh is freed. Eight weeks later, Sara calls Kira; Kynch is now in custody in the US. Donovan and the man at the check-in desk were also involved in Kynch's kidnapping plan. Sara travels to the US with Josh and plans to meet Kira there.

== Cast ==
- Jeanne Goursaud as Sara Wulf, a retired Hauptfeldwebel who served in the Fernspäher in Afghanistan, suffering from PTSD
- Dougray Scott as Erik Kynch, the DSS Regional Security Officer for the U.S. Consulate in Frankfurt, and a former high ranking USMC commander
- Lera Abova as Kira 'Irina' Volkowa a Belarusian opposition political refugee being held in the Consulate, who befriends Sara
- Kayode Akinyemi as Matthew Donovan, a USMC Gunnery Sergeant and leader of the Marine Security Guard at the Consulate
- Annabelle Mandeng as Deborah Allen, the U.S. Consul General in Frankfurt
- Lara Babalola as a Service Manager at the Consulate Information Desk
- Godfrey Egbon as Evan
- Kris Saddler as Justin Martello, a Consulate IT employee involved in drug smuggling via diplomatic bags
- Rada Rae as Aileen Kynch, Erik's daughter
- Rickson Guy da Silva as Joshua "Josh" Wulf, Sara's German-American son
- Susanne Michel as Anja Wulf, Sara's mother
- Samuel Tehrani as the Taliban Leader

== Production ==
The film was produced by Constantin Film, with Kerstin Schmidbauer as producer and Oliver Berben as executive producer. Filming took place in Vienna with the support of FISAplus, and ended in late 2023. Filming took place at, among other locations, the Althanstraße University Center, the site of the Vienna University of Economics and Business from 1982 to 2013.

Matthias Pötsch was the cameraman, Sara Barone wrote the music, Ueli Christen was in charge of editing, and Cornelia von Braun and Lisa Stutzky were in charge of casting. Heike Lange was the set designer, Anna Zeitlhuber the costume designer, Herbert Verdino the sound designer, and Aurora Hummer the make-up designer. Katharina Haudum served as intimacy coordinator, and Florian Hotz as stunt coordinator.

== Release ==
Exterritorial released by Netflix on April 30, 2025.

== Reception ==
=== Critical response ===
The film received mixed to positive reviews. Writing for the New York Times, Robert Daniels noted that "the oppressively white and bright setting, the psychological angst felt by Sara and Zübert´s insistence on long takes makes Exterritorial succeed as a frustrating fight for recognition." Jake Dee wrote on movieweb.de that "Exterritorial is a character-driven redemption story in the guise of a Die Hard-style actioner. Yet, for Sara, it's less about avenging external enemies and more about exterminating her inner demons... with its undeniable entertainment value, it's easy to see why the movie is so popular.

=== Views ===
According to FlixPatrol, the film reached number one on the Netflix charts in 79 countries on May 2, 2025. After twelve weeks the film ranks on number four of the Netflix all time Top Ten with over 90 million views. It is the most successful German film on Netflix ever.

According to data from Showlabs, The Four Seasons ranked second on Netflix in the United States during the week of 28 April–4 May 2025.
