= Three Quarter Moon =

- Film poster
- Directed by: Christian Zübert
- Written by: Christian Zübert
- Produced by: Dieter Ulrich Aselmann; Robert Marciniak
- Starring: Elmar Wepper; Mercan Türkoğlu; Ivan Anderson; Özay Fecht; Katja Rupé
- Cinematography: Jana Marsik
- Edited by: Mona Bräuer
- Music by: Annette Focks
- Release date: October 13, 2011
- Running time: 94 minutes
- Country: Germany
- Language: German

Three Quarter Moon (German: Dreiviertelmond) is a 2011 film based on an idea from Christian Zübert's wife İpek. They evolved the plot together.

== Plot ==
Taxi driver Hartmut Mackowiak (Elmar Wepper) is a seasoned man who has grown fond of firm habits and attitudes as it is not unusual for a man of his age. He shows no other ambitions than to do his job properly and to speak his mind. Mackowiak is no family man because his wife Christa (Katja Rupé) abandoned him and now he lives alone. One day a Turkish business woman becomes his passenger when she visits her mother in Nuremberg. She has her six-year-old daughter Hayat (Mercan Türkoğlu) with her because the child is supposed to get to know her grandmother (Özay Fecht) who lives in Germany. Mackowiak makes an impression on Hayat who is soon after left in grandmother's care while Hayat's mother goes abroad. Unfortunately grandmother is no longer up to the task of caring for a little child. Hayat feels that she is on her own when her grandmother suffers a stroke. Wondering to whom she could turn, the grumpy taxi driver comes to her mind. Mackowiak is downright flabbergasted when he realises that she seems to consider his taxi her refuge and that she's thinking "Nazi" was his name because she overheard her mother calling him that. However, he then also realises little by little he is neither too old to make new friends nor unable to learn to look at his world from a hitherto unknown point of view. Thus he even finds a new approach to his wife.

== Reception ==
The film had friendly reviews and entered the Top Ten of German box office charts. The Deutsche Film- und Medienbewertung awarded the film an "Especially Valuable" ("Besonders wertvoll"). It entered numerous festivals such as the International Dubai Film Festival or the Palm Springs International Film Festival and received many awards and nominations.
