= Leonard Carow =

German actor

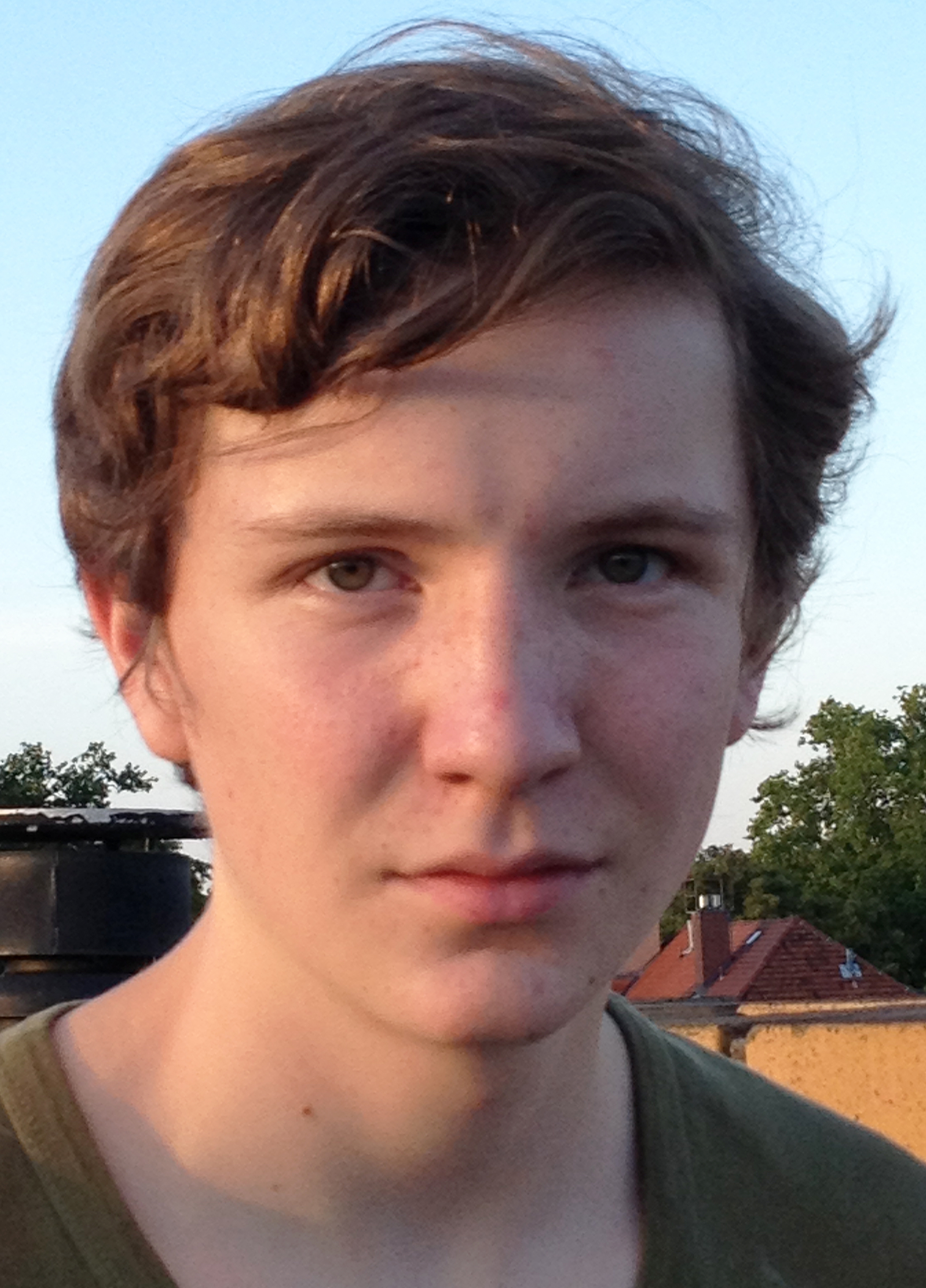
- Leonard Carow, August 2012
- Born: 26 June 1994 (age 31); Berlin, Germany
- Occupation: actor

Leonard Carow (born 26 June 1994) is a German actor. He has appeared in several German television films and series, and in Steven Spielberg's 2011 film, War Horse.

== Filmography ==
=== Cinema ===
- 2014 Who Am I, MRX
- 2011 War Horse, Michael
- 2011 Pigeons on the Roof (German title: Die Relativitätstheorie der Liebe), Hanno

=== Television ===
- 2008 Sklaven und Herren (TV movie), Klaus Pohl
- 2008 Polizeiruf 110 (TV series), Tim Bachmeier
- 2004-2007 Tatort (TV series), Timmy Stemmler
- 2007 Mondkalb, Tom Hatzky
- 2006 Ich leih mir eine Familie (TV movie), Paul
- 2006 Unsere zehn Gebote (TV series), Leon
- 2006 30 Something (TV movie), Josh
- 2005 SOKO Wismar (TV series), Junge
- 2004 Mord am Meer (TV movie), Felix Glauberg
- 2004 Typisch Mann! (TV series), Philip Wolf
- 2004 Operation Valkyrie (TV movie), Heimeran v. Stauffenberg (uncredited)

== Awards ==
In 2017, Carow was awarded a Goldene Kamera as best young professional of the year.
