= Emma Bading =

German actress

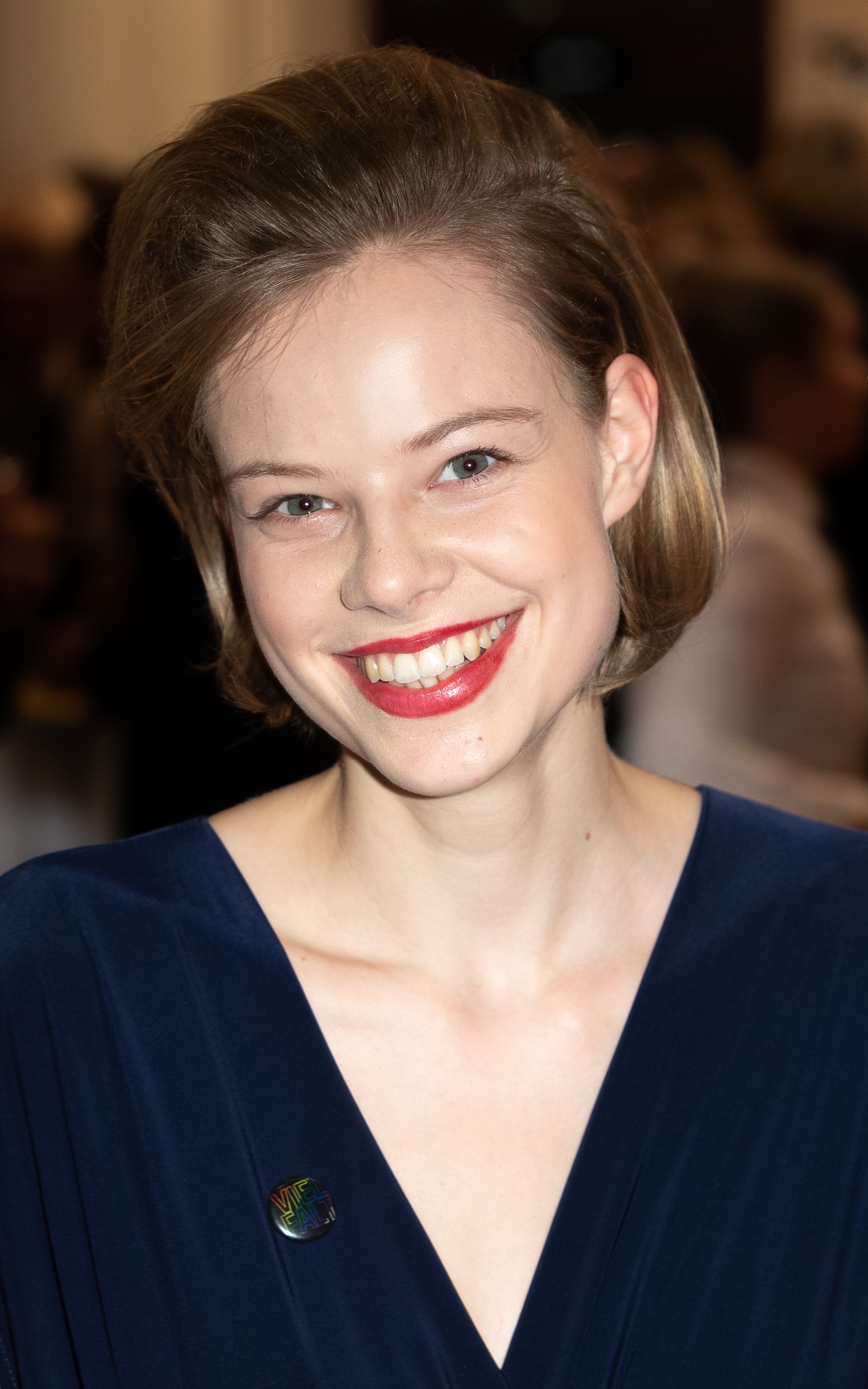
- Bading in 2019.
- Born: 12 March 1998 (age 27); Monheim am Rhein, Germany
- Occupation: Actress
- Years active: 2013–present

Emma Bading (born March 12, 1998) is a German actress. She was nominated for an International Emmy Award for Best Performance by an Actress for her role in the TV film Play.

== Filmography ==
- 2013: Everyday Objects
- 2014: Weiter als der Ozean (TV movie)
- since 2014: Der Usedom-Krimi (TV series) → see episodes
- 2015: Tatort: Das Muli (TV series)
- 2015: Kommissarin Lucas: Der Wald (TV series)
- 2015: The Small and the Wicked
- 2016: Wir sind die Rosinskis (TV movie)
- 2016: Böser Wolf – Ein Taunuskrimi (TV movie)
- 2017: Berlin Syndrom
- 2017: Helen Dorn: Verlorene Mädchen (TV series)
- 2017: Lucky Loser – Ein Sommer in der Bredouille
- 2017: Different Kinds of Rain
- 2018: Meine teuflisch gute Freundin
- 2018: In My Room
- 2018: As Green As It Gets
- 2019: Play (TV movie)
- 2021: Dear Thomas
- 2021: Westwall
- 2023: De man uit Rome as Térèse (TV movie)
- 2024: From Hilde, With Love

== Accolades ==
48th International Emmy Awards

1. International Emmy Award for Best Performance by an Actress for Play (Nominee)

2019 Hessian TV Award

1. Best Actress for Play (Won)

2018 Deutscher Filmpreis

1. Best Young Actor for Lucky Loser – Ein Sommer in der Bredouille (Nominee)

2017 Munich Film Festival

1. Best Acting for Lucky Loser - Ein Sommer in der Bredouille (Nominee)
