= The Silence (2010 film) =

- Directed by: Baran bo Odar
- Written by: Baran bo Odar
- Based on: Das Schweigen by Jan Costin Wagner
- Produced by: Frank Evers; Maren Lüthje; Florian Schneider; Jörg Schulze
- Starring: Ulrich Thomsen; Wotan Wilke Möhring; Katrin Sass
- Cinematography: Nikolaus Summerer
- Edited by: Robert Rzesacz
- Music by: Michael Kamm; Kris Steininger; Tim Allhoff
- Production companies: Cine Plus; Lüthje & Schneider Filmproduktion; Das Kleine Fernsehspiel (ZDF); ARTE
- Release date: 19 August 2010
- Running time: 118 minutes
- Country: Germany
- Language: German
- Budget: €2,300,000

The Silence (German: Das letzte Schweigen) is a 2010 German thriller film directed by Baran bo Odar, after the German crime fiction novel The Silence (German: Das Schweigen) by Jan Costin Wagner.

== Plot ==
Summer 1986: Pia, an 11-year-old schoolgirl, is raped and murdered in a wheat field near a small provincial German town by one man while another man watches silently from the passenger seat of his red car. The murderer packs Pia's body into the trunk of the car and leaves her bicycle behind.

In 2009, exactly 23 years later, 13-year-old Sinikka Weghamm goes missing from the local fair. Her bicycle is discovered in the same spot where Pia's bike had been found.

Senior detective Krischan Mittich, who investigated the original murder, has just retired. The new murder investigation is undertaken by David Jahn, a detective who is still emotionally overwhelmed by the death of his wife five months earlier. Mittich takes an interest in the new case, but he is blocked from participating by the new senior detective, Matthias Grimmer, who insists on doing things his way, even when he is wrong.

A flashback shows the initial meeting of Pia's murderer, Danish national Peer Sommer, and his companion, a student named Timo. The men form a bond as Sommer shares his collection of child pornography films, including one that shows the abuse of an adolescent girl, with Timo.

Timo leaves after Pia's murder, to Sommer's dismay.

Mittich, the retired detective, visits Pia's mother and rails against the false hope that detective Grimmer holds out for Sinikka's parents, who grow increasingly upset at the lack of progress in the investigation.

Timo, who has married, taken his wife's last name, and had two children of his own, is now an architect. Upon hearing of the new murder, he leaves home and makes his way back to Sommer. Sommer is glad to see his old friend and says that he had tried unsuccessfully to find Timo after he had left 23 years earlier. Sommer gives Timo a DVD copy of the old film with the girl.

Timo leaves Sommer again. He watches the DVD in his hotel room and cries with shame and guilt. He goes to see Pia's mother. His questions about Pia make the mother suspicious, and she tells ex-detective Mittich about him. Timo goes to the police station, presumably to confess, and Jahn notices him in the parking lot about to exit his car, but Timo has second thoughts and leaves.

Based on Timo's suspicious questions to Pia's mother, Jahn and Mittich visit Timo's house. He is not home, but the detectives question his wife and then find child pornography on his computer.

Jahn meanwhile has gotten the idea of matching the list of red cars in the vicinity of Pia's murder with the list of red cars in the vicinity of an earlier murder. After initially rejecting the idea, Grimmer adopts the idea and sends his subordinates, including pregnant Jana Gläser, but not including Jahn, out to interview the owners of the cars. Jahn sets out with Gläser anyway, but he leaves her when he gets word that a suspicious man (Timo) has visited Pia's mother. Gläser interviews Sommer alone. Sommer consults his diary to provide an alibi for his whereabouts at the time of Sinikka's murder; he hides a knife on his person in case she acts too suspicious, but she tentatively accepts the alibi, though she puts a question mark next to Sommer's name.

Timo commits suicide by driving a car into the lake where Sinikka is later found, and afterwards, Grimmer believes that Timo was the sole murderer of both girls, but Jahn is not convinced. Following this, Sinikka's body is found by a swimmer, and her parents are informed. Jahn realizes that Pia's headphones had been tossed from the passenger side of the car after her murder, and that means that someone else was driving the car. He hypothesizes that Sinikka's murder had been a signal from the other man, a lonely pedophile, that he wanted to reunite with his old friend. But Grimmer does not want to hear any new theories, and, after a tussle, he suspends Jahn.

Sommer, who had told detective Gläser that he no longer has a car, is seen returning home in a car lent to him by a neighbor—the same car that was used in Sinikka's abduction. He learns of Timo's death, and the film ends with him contemplating the loss of his friend.

== Cast ==
- Wotan Wilke Möhring as Timo Friedrich
- Sebastian Blomberg as David Jahn
- Katrin Sass as Elena Lange
- Ulrich Thomsen as Peer Sommer
- Karoline Eichhorn as Ruth Weghamm
- Roeland Wiesnekker as Karl Weghamm
- Jule Böwe as Jana Gläser
- Burghart Klaußner as Krischan Mittich
- Claudia Michelsen as Julia Friedrich
- Oliver Stokowski as Matthias Grimmer
- Anna Lena Klenke as Sinikka Weghamm
- Helene Luise Doppler as Pia Lange

== Reception ==
The Guardian's Peter Bradshaw reviewed favourably the film writing "this icy, gripping police procedural thriller is easy to recommend for fans of The Killing, and indeed for anyone else, too".
The film won or was nominated for the following awards:

- Special Jury Award, Beaune film Festival 2011
- Best Adaptation Award, Frankfurt Book Fair 2010
- Audience Award German Thriller Award
- Nominated for the German Film Critics Award
- Nominated for the Prix Europe 2011

== Soundtrack ==
Das letzte Schweigen

Soundtrack album by Pas de Deux
- Genre: Soundtracks
- Label: Ni Records

No.	Title	Artist	Length
1.	"Pia"	Pas de Deux	3:32
2.	"The Silence"	Pas de Deux	1:50
3.	"Farewell"	Pas de Deux	2:07
4.	"I Am Timo"	Pas de Deux	2:21
5.	"Sinikka"	Pas de Deux	3:12
6.	"Memento"	Pas de Deux	1:26
7.	"Talking to Silence"	Pas de Deux	3:09
8.	"Prelude, Pt. 1"	Pas de Deux	1:00
9.	"The Nightmare"	Pas de Deux	1:54
10.	"Martina"	Pas de Deux	3:02
11.	"Draw the Curtain"	Pas de Deux	3:18
12.	"Broken Silence"	Pas de Deux	1:17
13.	"Epilogue"	Pas de Deux	1:09
14.	"Requiem"	Pas de Deux	1:10
15.	"The Lake"	Pas de Deux	1:34
16.	"Prelude, Pt. 2"	Pas de Deux	0:53
17.	"Redemption"	Pas de Deux	1:15
18.	"The Awakening"	Pas de Deux	6:12
19.	"All Is Lost"	Pas de Deux	3:06
20.	"Peer's Ending"	Pas de Deux	3:59

== See also ==
- Crime fiction
