= Who Am I (2014 film) =

2014 German techno-thriller film

- Theatrical release poster
- Directed by: Baran bo Odar
- Written by: Jantje Friese; Baran bo Odar
- Produced by: Quirin Berg; Max Wiedemann; Justyna Muesch
- Starring: Tom Schilling; Elyas M'Barek
- Cinematography: Nikolaus Summerer
- Edited by: Robert Rzesacz
- Music by: Michael Kamm
- Production companies: Deutsche Columbia Pictures Filmproduktion; Wiedemann & Berg Film; Seven Pictures
- Distributed by: Sony Pictures Releasing GmbH
- Release dates: 6 September 2014 (TIFF); 25 September 2014 (Germany)
- Running time: 105 minutes
- Country: Germany
- Language: German

Who Am I (German: Who Am I – Kein System ist sicher; lit. 'Who Am I: No System Is Safe' and alternative title: Undercover Hackers) is a 2014 German techno-thriller film co-written and directed by Baran bo Odar. It is centered on a computer hacker group in Berlin geared towards global fame. It was screened in the Contemporary World Cinema section at the 2014 Toronto International Film Festival. The film was shot in Berlin and Rostock. Because of its storyline and some elements, the film is often compared to Fight Club and Mr. Robot.

== Plot ==
Benjamin Engel, a hacker from Berlin, sits in an interrogation room. The officer in charge tells Hanne Lindberg, Head of the Cyber Division of Europol, that Benjamin asked to conduct the interrogation. Benjamin says that he has information regarding FR13NDS (/frɛndz/), a notorious hacking group of four members connected to the Russian cyber mafia, and MRX, an infamous hacker known on Darknet; he tells her that he could give them both to Hanne if she listens to him. Having no choice, Hanne sits down.

Benjamin tells Hanne that he is like a superhero: like many heroes, he, too, has no parents; he never met his father as he abandoned the family when Benjamin was born, and his mother committed suicide when he was 8. He lives alone with his ailing grandmother. He regards his "superpower" as invisibility, as he was never noticed by most people during his childhood, due to him being socially awkward. He says he learned programming and hacked his first system when he was 14. Though he felt like a loser in real life, he felt a sense of belonging on the Internet. While spending most of his time on Darknet, he met his hacking hero, MRX, whose identity no one knows and who can hack into any system. Benjamin aspires to be like him.

However, as he was unable to attend university, he worked as a pizza delivery boy to pay the bills. He tells Hanne that, one night while he delivered pizzas to a group of students, he saw Marie, a girl with whom he was in love since his school days. Hearing her having trouble with examinations, he decided to help her and be a 'superhero'. He went to the university, hacked into its servers to download the exam questions—but he was caught by a security guard and arrested. Having no prior criminal record, he was forced to perform community service as a punishment.

He tells Hanne that while working on cleaning the streets as punishment, he met Max, a fellow hacker, who Benjamin feels is the opposite of himself; a charismatic, cocky and confident individual. Later, Max had introduced him to his colleagues Stephan and Paul. After Benjamin proved himself as a hacker, Max explained to him that the concept of social engineering is the greatest form of hacking. They decide to form a hacking group, called "Clowns Laughing At You", nicknamed CLAY, and they use Benjamin's house as a base of operations, since Benjamin was forced to send his grandmother to a nursing home due to her Alzheimer's disease. They cause general mayhem around Berlin in a form of pranking, becoming popular around social media. However, MRX, with whom is Max obsessed, mocks them outright. Infuriated, Max wants to perform a more outrageous feat of hacking, and Benjamin suggest hacking the main building of BND (German Central Intelligence). Impressed by this outrageous idea, the group agrees with Benjamin and decide to hack the BND in order to impress MRX.

Using dumpster diving and phishing to gain access to the BND building, they manage to hack the internal servers and hack the printers to print their logo, titled "NO SYSTEM IS SAFE", all around the building, impressing MRX. However, when they go to a club and celebrate, Benjamin notices Max kissing Marie. Infuriated, Benjamin refuses to let them into the house, also offending Marie when she visits him due to his anger. Feeling inferior, he secretly contacts MRX, offering him valuable information: a database from BND's private servers, which he hacked while he was in the BND building, which impresses MRX. When the group arrives the next day, Benjamin is still furious and attacks Max, who responds by beating him up. However, Paul, watching the TV, hears on the news that one of the members of FR13NDS, nicknamed Krypton, was murdered. Benjamin admits that he gave the information from the BND to MRX, and after checking them, realizes that the information identified Krypton as a double agent working with Hanne to expose MRX and FR13NDS, and CLAY is now labeled as a terrorist group for hacking the information.

Seeking to clear their name for the murder, Benjamin contacts MRX, who instructs them to hack into the Europol database in exchange for MRX's identity, giving them a hacking tool to help. After dissolving their hard drives in acid to erase data, they travel to Europol's headquarters in The Hague in order to try and break their way in—but it's impossible to find a way inside. The headquarters dump their trash in a secured building, the sewers are locked, and phishing attempts failed. However, while checking out the building, Benjamin notices a group of scholars visiting the building, and one of them drops his visitor card. Using Max's advice about social engineering, Benjamin manages to gain access to the building by fooling a guard and plants a hacking device inside. He then hacks into the internal Europol servers and provides MRX with an entrance, secretly encoded inside a double trojan horse so MRX will be exposed when he tries to gain access. However, MRX, anticipating this, takes a snapshot of Benjamin via his webcam, exposing him. Benjamin is forced to flee when a group of Russian mobsters finds him; he evades them in the subway.

Benjamin returns to the hotel where he was staying with the trio, only to find them murdered. Having no other choice and knowing that FRI3NDS would kill him, he decided to turn himself in to Hanne, proving that he is serious after stating that he hacked her profile and learned personal information about her. Hanne, who was suspended for her failure to capture them and is desperate to apprehend FRI3NDS and MRX, agrees to put Benjamin into a witness protection program in exchange for capturing them. Benjamin logs in as MRX himself and spreads lies about MRX being a snitch, forcing the real MRX to force his way into the Darknet servers with unsafe methods, allowing Benjamin to expose him. MRX is exposed as a 19-year-old American boy from New York City, whom the FBI arrests in a coffee shop.

However, after agreeing to give Benjamin the witness exchange program, Hanne notices a wound going through his palm (the same wound that Max got after running a nail through his hand), and realizes that Max, Stephan and Paul are all made-up characters. Distraught, she visits Benjamin's doctor, who states that his mother had multiple personality disorder and committed suicide because of it, learning that it can be genetically inherited. Hanne connects various plot holes in Benjamin's story and realizes that "he" alone was CLAY; he committed all the atrocities, he hacked into the BND alone, and he planted the WWII bullets from his grandmother in the hotel to make it look like they were killed, imagining the trio due to his illness. Hanne confronts Benjamin, who has an emotional breakdown, as people with mental disorders cannot be given witness protection. However, Hanne changes her mind and allows him access to the witness protection program, revealed to be an "actual" program containing information about all citizens of Germany; Benjamin changes his identity here. Hanne, dropping Benjamin off, states that she let him go because he truly wants to stay invisible, and lets him go on the condition that he never hacks again.

Benjamin, now sporting blonde hair, is standing alone on a Scandlines ferry heading north. However, he is suddenly joined by Marie, Max, Stephan and Paul. In narration, Benjamin states that he performed "the greatest social engineering hack" ever; the scene shifts back to Benjamin going back to the hotel, finding the guys alive and well; he instructs them to flee since MRX knows his identity, but they refuse to leave him behind. After Marie visits them and confirms that mentally ill subjects cannot be granted witness protection, they devise a plan for Benjamin to go to Hanne and dictate the story, deliberately giving plot holes which she will most likely decipher, and then using her grief for him to give him access to the witness protection program, and also spiking his hand with a nail to make the story seem truthful. In the server room, it was revealed that Benjamin didn't change his identity, he "erased" it completely. Benjamin states that Hanne will eventually realize his deception, but she won't hunt him down as she got what she wanted. Indeed, at a press conference announcing the defeat of FR13NDS and MRX, Hanne, having an epiphany, smiles as she realizes the truth.

== Cast ==
- Tom Schilling as Benjamin Engel
- Elyas M'Barek as Max
- Hannah Herzsprung as Marie
- Wotan Wilke Möhring as Stephan
- Antoine Monot, Jr. as Paul
- Trine Dyrholm as Hanne Lindberg
- Stephan Kampwirth as Martin Bohmer
- Leonard Carow as MRX
- Lena Dörrie as BKA Investigator

== Allusions and parallels ==
- Clay's first action is directed against the right-wing party NBD, an allusion to the NPD. Clay slips them a disparaging Hitler commercial at their party meeting, which is shown in front of the party members.
- The main character of the film Fight Club has a dissociative identity disorder, as does Benjamin apparently. A Fight Club film poster hangs in Benjamin's room.
- In the BND's list of employees, their “nicknames” can be found alongside their real names. These come from the DC Comics and Marvel Comics universes (e.g. Krypton).
- When Benjamin is in the car with Hanne Lindberg shortly before his release, a person can briefly be seen in the background watching the action. This led to speculation about a second part. In an interview, Odar revealed:
  When he explains the trick to her in the car and puts down the sugar cubes, you see someone standing in the background wearing a CLAY mask, who really has no business being there. I want to make this clear: He is and remains schizophrenic and creates characters that aren't actually there
- In an interview, Odar confirmed that he had staged Hannah Herzsprung's role in such a way that she never really notices or looks at the boys. Likewise, Odar confesses:
  For me, the guys don't exist until the end
  However, he leaves the question of the friends' existence open to the viewer. The question of whether Benjamin's friends are real or imaginary is therefore still unresolved at the end.
- The painting “La reproduction interdite” (1937) by the Belgian surrealist René Magritte appears several times in the film. A copy hangs in the office of the doctor who is treating Benjamin's grandmother. In the scene after the BND hack, in which the protagonists celebrate their success, the motif appears again. We see Benjamin standing in front of a mirror in the toilet from behind. In the mirror, however, we do not see his reflection but, just as in “The Forbidden Reproduction”, his back.
- In the credits at the end of the film, the program code of the Back Orifice software, a remote maintenance software that is generally considered a rootkit and thus a tool of hackers, is shown in the background.

== Reception ==
The film premiered in the Contemporary World Cinema section at the 2014 Toronto International Film Festival. It was also screened at the 17th European Union Film Festival. The film won three German Movie Awards and the Bambi for Best German Film.

== Other versions ==
Warner Bros. struck a deal in 2014 to remake the film. David Goyer is set to direct the film. The script will be written by Dan Wiedenhaupt, who wrote the Albert Hughes-directed The Solutrean. The film will be produced by Goyer and his Phantom Four banner, along with Kevin Turen and Langley Park's Kevin McCormick.
