= Hans Funck =

German film editor (1953–2014)

- Born: March 7, 1953
- Died: July 16, 2014 (aged 61); Munich, Bavaria, Germany
- Occupation: Film editor
- Years active: 1996–2014

Hans Funck (7 March 1953 – 16 July 2014) was a German film editor.

He was most closely associated with director Oliver Hirschbiegel, having edited all but one of the films Hirschbiegel made between 1998 and 2013. These include Das Experiment (2001), Downfall (2004), The Invasion (2007), Five Minutes of Heaven (2009) and Diana (2013).

Funck was Katja von Garnier's editor on the 1997 road movie Bandits and the 2004 drama Iron Jawed Angels. Funck also frequently worked with director Marc Rothemund, most notably on 2005's Sophie Scholl – The Final Days. Funck's other notable credits include Stefan Ruzowitzky's 2003 thriller Anatomy 2, Robert Schwentke's 2003 black comedy Eierdiebe (The Family Jewels), and Sönke Wortmann's Pope Joan.

Funck died of an apparent asthma attack at his apartment in Munich on 16 July 2014. He was working on the final cut of a film for Ankie Lau titled Wishing Tree when he died; it was this film's production team that found Funck's body. In a statement, Lau remembered Funck as "a true friend and one of the most extraordinarily talented film editors in the history of German cinema." Funck had also begun working on director Mika Kaurismäki's film The Girl King just before his death.
