= Moritz Bleibtreu =

German actor (born 1971)

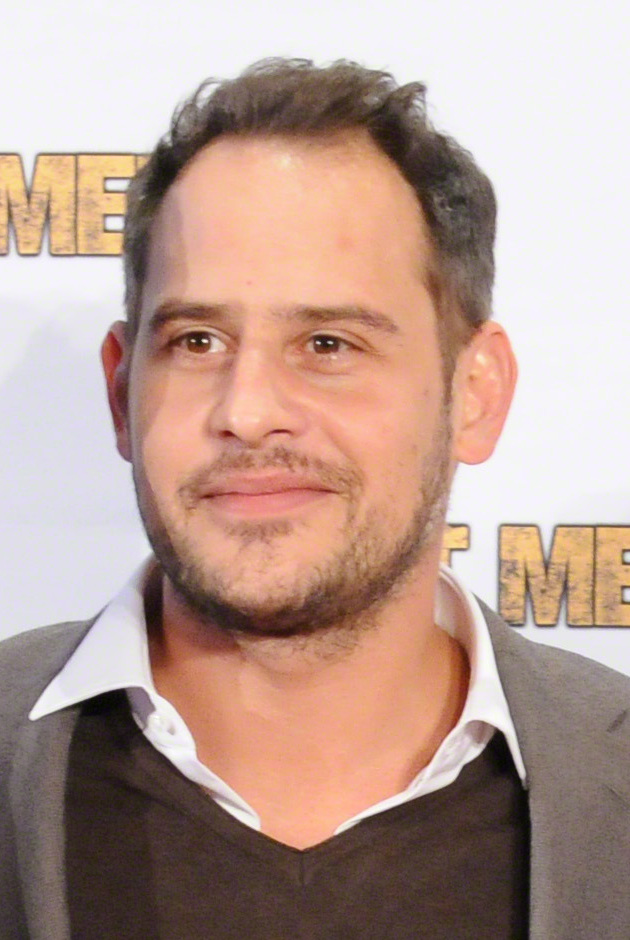
- Bleibtreu in 2014
- Born: Moritz Johann Bleibtreu; 13 August 1971 (age 55); Munich, Bavaria, West Germany
- Occupation: Actor
- Years active: 1977–present

Moritz Johann Bleibtreu (German: [ˈmoːʁɪts ˈblaɪptʁɔʏ] is a German film actor, voice actor, and film director. After coming to prominence with his role in the 1997 gangster film Knockin' on Heaven's Door, he went on to appear in films such as Run Lola Run, Das Experiment, The Baader Meinhof Complex, and Elementary Particles.

== Life ==
Moritz Bleibtreu was born in 1971 and was raised in the St. Georg district of Hamburg. His parents, Monica Bleibtreu, (1944–2009) and, Hans Brenner, (1938–1998) were both actors. Well-known writer Renato Attilio Bleibtreu is Moritz's grandfather. Many of his ancestors were actors also, such as his great-grandmother Maximiliane Bleibtreu, her sister Hedwig Bleibtreu and their parents Amalie and Sigmund Bleibtreu. Actress Cilli Drexel is the half-sister of Moritz. The Bleibtreustrasse, a street in Berlin, was originally named after Georg Bleibtreu who was a battle painter and a distant ancestor of Moritz. Moritz was in the spotlight from an early age, starring in children's series Neues aus Uhlenbusch (News From Uhlenbusch) written by Rainer Boldt, Bleibtreu's mother Monica and her then-husband Hans Peter Korff. Bleibtreu's career continued to grow as he got a role in Boldt's I Had a Dream, and then in 1986 in With My Hot Tears, a television series he acted in alongside his mother.

Bleibtreu grew up attending the Jahnschule, now known as the Ida-Ehre-School, in Hamburg-Harvestehude. There he studied until he got his secondary school certificate in the eleventh grade. Bleibtreu then moved to Paris to work as an au pair for almost two years, during which he learned French. He moved to Italy afterwards for a year and then on to New York, where he attended acting school. He auditioned for the Actors Studio, which did not result in a job but he was able to get on as a factotum, which let him observe the actors' rehearsals.

Bleibtreu had a son in November 2008 with his then wife Annika in Reinbek, Germany. He married Saskia de Tschaschell in Reinbek at the Maria-Magdelenen Church on 21 July 2022.

== Acting career ==
After 4 years of studying abroad, Bleibtreu began working at the Thalia Theater and the Schauspielhaus in Hamburg, Germany. He began getting smaller roles in television series, beginning in 1993 with a role in the series Schulz & Schulz. Bleibtreu took a role in The Little Innocent (1994) as Thorsten, a gay bartender in the Hamburg prostitute scene. In the show, he helps a 16-year-old boy prove his father's innocence after he is convicted of killing a young man who lived in Hamburg's red-light district. Bleibtreu also starred in romantic comedy Talk of the Town (1995), playing the role of Karl, a naive homosexual carpenter.

In 1998, Moritz began to step away from acting in TV series and began to focus on film. He said, "cinema is an active form of watching, while television is a passive one". Bleibtreu has appeared in many well-known films such as Run Lola Run, Knockin' on Heaven's Door, The Baader Meinhof Complex, and The Experiment.

He also worked on many other films such as Solino, im Juli, Chiko, and Soul Kitchen in which he worked with filmmaker Fatih Akin. Moritz won the German Film Award for best leading actor in the films im Juli and The Experiment. He was a member of the jury at the 25th Moscow International Film Festival.

Bleibtreu worked as a voice actor in films such as Disney's Brother Bear (2004) and Brother Bear 2 (2006). He was awarded the Silver Bear for Best Actor in 2006 for his role in Elementary Particles directed by Oskar Roehler. He enjoys taking smaller supporting roles in international co-productions such as Sam Barbarski's Vijay and I, Danish film Der Fakir (2004), and Johannes Naber's film adaptation of Wilhelm Hauff's Heart of Stone (2016).

In 2015, he stepped back into the TV production spotlight after 17 years, starring for three seasons of the ZDF crime series called Schuld. The TV series was based on Ferdinand von Schriach; Bleibtreu played the role of Friedrich Kronberg, a criminal defense lawyer. Following encouragement by his fans for a sequel to the 2001 classic German stoner film Lammbock, Bleibtreu announced in November 2015 that the sequel would be titled Lommbock, which was released in 2017.

He played a leading role in the musical adaptation "I've Never Been to New York" (2019). He worked alongside a couple other famous actors and actresses such as Katharina Thalbach, Heike Makatsch, and Uwe Ochsenknecht in films such as I've Never Been to New York and Love Your Neighbour. Bleibtreu took on the role of director for the first time with "Cortex", which premiered at Filmfest Hamburg in October 2020. The following year he worked in a six-part RTL drama series called "Faking Hitler".

== Directing career ==
Bleibtreu began his career in directing in 2019 with his psychological thriller Cortex, which he described as "very personal to him". He cited as his motivation for directing the film that "... he believed he wanted to watch a film like this himself". He also said that "directing was not an escape from acting, but rather just another challenge for his journey". Bleibtreu also played the lead role of security officer Hagen. According to IMDb with 540 viewer ratings, Cortex received a 5.3 out of 10 stars. German film critic Christopher Diekhaus said in a review that "Bleibtreu finds his own way to challenge and captivate the audience" and that the film "creates an abysmal pull and makes you want to watch it several times to better understand the dance between dream and reality".

== Selected filmography ==
Year	Title	Role	Director	Notes
1994	Simply Love	Yüksel	Peter Timm	
1994	The Little Innocent	Thorsten	Rainer Kaufmann	TV film
1995	Talk of the Town	Karl	Rainer Kaufmann	
1997	Knockin' On Heaven's Door	Abdul	Thomas Jahn	
1998	Run Lola Run	Manni	Tom Tykwer	
1998	Love Your Neighbour!	Tristan Müller	Detlev Buck	
1999	Das Gelbe vom Ei	Toon Jungjohann	Lars Becker	TV film
1999	Luna Papa	Nasreddin	Bakhtyar Khudojnazarov	
2000	In July	Daniel Bannier	Fatih Akın	
2000	Fandango	DJ Sunny	Matthias Glasner	
2001	The Invisible Circus	Eric	Adam Brooks	
2001	Das Experiment	Tarek Fahd / Number 77	Oliver Hirschbiegel	
2001	Lammbock	Kai	Christian Zübert	
2001	Taking Sides	Lt. David Wills	István Szabó	
2002	Solino	Giancarlo	Fatih Akın	
2004	Germanikus	Kaiser Titus	Hanns Christian Müller	
2004	C(r)ook	Valentin	Pepe Danquart	
2004	Agnes and His Brothers	Hans-Jörg Tschirner	Oskar Roehler	
2004	Fakiren fra Bilbao	Lombardo	Peter Flinth	
2005	The Keeper: The Legend of Omar Khayyam	Malikshah	Kayvan Mashayekh	
2005	About the Looking for and the Finding of Love	Mimi Nachtigal	Helmut Dietl	
2005	Munich	Andreas	Steven Spielberg	
2006	Atomised – The Elementary Particles	Bruno	Oskar Roehler	
2006	The Stone Council	Serguei Makov	Guillaume Nicloux	
2007	The Walker	Emek Yoglu	Paul Schrader	
2007	The Lark Farm	Ferzan	Paolo and Vittorio Taviani	
2007	Reclaim Your Brain	Rainer	Hans Weingartner	
2008	Chiko	Brownie	Özgür Yıldırım	
2008	Speed Racer	Grey Ghost	The Wachowskis	
2008	Adam Resurrected	Joseph Gracci	Paul Schrader	
2008	The Baader Meinhof Complex	Andreas Baader	Uli Edel	
2008	Female Agents	SS Standartenführer Karl Heindrich	Jean-Paul Salomé	
2009	Soul Kitchen	Illias Kazantsakis	Fatih Akın	
2010	Zeiten ändern dich	Arafat Abou-Chaker	Uli Edel	
2010	Jew Suss: Rise and Fall	Joseph Goebbels	Oskar Roehler	
2010	Jerry Cotton	Sammy Serrano	Philipp Stennert, Cyrill Boss	
2010	Young Goethe in Love	Albert Kestner	Philipp Stölzl	
2010	Angel of Evil	Sergio	Michele Placido	
2011	My Best Enemy	Viktor Israel Kaufmann	Wolfgang Murnberger	
2011	360	Businessman	Fernando Meirelles	
2012	The Fourth State	Paul Jensen	Dennis Gansel	
2012	Guardians	Rudi	Til Schweiger	
2013	Sources of Life	Klaus Freytag	Oskar Roehler	
2013	World War Z	W.H.O. Doctor	Marc Forster	
2013	Vijay and I	Will / Vijay	Sam Garbarski	
2013	The Fifth Estate	Marcus	Bill Condon	
2013	Die schwarzen Brüder	Antonio Luini	Xavier Koller	
2014	Not My Day	Nappo	Peter Thorwarth	
2014	Stereo	Henry	Maximilian Erlenwein	
2015	Woman in Gold	Gustav Klimt	Simon Curtis	
2015	Kill Your Friends	Rudi	Owen Harris	
2015	The Dark Side of the Moon	Urs Blank	Stephan Rick	
2016	The Confessions	Mark Klein	Roberto Andò	
2016	Heart of Stone	Holländer-Michel	Johannes Naber	
2017	Lommbock	Kai	Christian Zübert	
2017	Bye Bye Germany	David	Sam Garbarski	
2017	Only God Can Judge Me	Ricky	Özgür Yıldırım	
2018	Cut Off	Paul Herzfeld	Christian Alvart	
2019	Roads	Luttger	Sebastian Schipper	
2019	Ich war noch niemals in New York	Axel Staudach	Philipp Stölzl	
2020	Cortex	Hagen	Moritz Bleibtreu	
2021	Blackout	Pierre Manzano	Oliver Rihs & Lancelot von Naso	
2023	Das Engelsgesicht	Giorgio Basile	Oliver Hirschbiegel	
2024	Bonhoeffer	Karl Bonhoeffer	Todd Komarnicki	

== Awards ==
Year	Country and Show	Award	Movie	Winner or Nominee	References
1997	Germany (German Film Awards)	Best Performance in a Supporting Role (Film Award in Gold)	Knockin' on Heaven's Door	Winner	Same Website Used For All
1998	Germany	Ernst Lubitsch Award	Knockin' on Heaven's Door Talk of the Town	Winner	
1999	Germany (Berlin International Film Festival)	EPF Shooting Star		Winner	
2001	Germany (German Film Awards)	Best Performance by an Actor in a Leading Role (Film Award in Gold)	Das Experiment In July	Winner	
2001	Germany (German Film Awards)	German Actor/Actress of the Year (Audience Award)		Winner	
2001	Germany (Jupiter Awards)	Best German Actor	Das Experiment	Winner	
2002	United States (Seattle International Film Festival)	Best Actor (Golden Space Needle Award)	Das Experiment	Winner	
2005	Austria (Roma Gala)	Favorite Actor (Romy)	About the Looking for and the Finding of Love	Winner	
2006	Austria (Roma Gala)	Favorite Actor (Romy)	Atomised	Winner	
2006	Germany (German Film Awards)	Best Performance by an Actor in a Leading Role (Film Award in Gold)	Atomised	Nominee	
2006	Germany (Berlin International Film Festival)	Best Actor (Silver Berlin Bear)	Atomised	Winner	
2006	Germany (Bambi Awards)	National Best Actor (Bambi)	Atomised	Nominee	
2008	Austria (Roma Gala)	Favorite Actor (Romy)	Reclaim Your Brain	Nominee	
2009	Germany (European Film Awards)	Best European Actor	The Baader Meinhof Complex	Nominee	
2011	Austria (Austrian Film Awards)	Best Actor (Austrian Film Award)	Jew Suss: Rise and Fall	Nominee	
2011	Austria (Roma Gala)	Favorite Actor (Romy)	Jew Suss: Rise and Fall	Nominee	
2015	Germany (Jupiter Awards)	Best German Actor	Not My Day	Nominee	
2017	Germany (Jupiter Awards)	Best German Actor	The Dark Side of the Moon	Nominee	
2020	Estonia (Tallinn Black Nights Film Festival)	Rebels With a Cause Award	Cortex	Nominee	
2022	Germany (German Television Awards)	Best Actor	Faking Hitler	Winner	
2022	Germany (German Screen Actors Awards)	Best Comedy Role (DSP Award)	Faking Hitler	Nominee	
