= One Breath (2015 film) =

2015 film

- Directed by: Christian Zübert
- Written by: Christian Zübert; Ipek Zübert
- Starring: Jördis Triebel
- Release dates: 12 September 2015 (TIFF); 29 October 2015 (Germany)
- Country: Germany
- Language: German

One Breath (German: Ein Atem) is a 2015 German drama film directed by Christian Zübert. It was screened in the Contemporary World Cinema section of the 2015 Toronto International Film Festival to positive reviews.

== Cast ==
- Jördis Triebel as Tessa
- Chara Mata Giannatou as Elena
- Benjamin Sadler as Jan
- Apostolis Totsikas as Costas
- Nike Maria Vassil as Sofia
- Pinelopi Sergounioti as Despina
- Mary Nanou as Maria
- Akilas Karazisis as Tiberios Laskari
