= SK-Babies =

- Country of origin: Germany

SK-Babies is a German television series.

== See also ==
- List of German television series
