= Frauenarzt Dr. Markus Merthin =

- Starring: Sascha Hehn
- Country of origin: Germany

Frauenarzt Dr. Markus Merthin is a German television series.

== See also ==
- List of German television series
