= Frank Giering =

German actor

- Born: 23 November 1971; Magdeburg, East Germany
- Died: 23 June 2010 (aged 38); Berlin-Charlottenburg, Germany
- Occupation: Actor
- Years active: 1993–2010

Frank Giering (23 November 1971 – 23 June 2010) was a German actor.

== Biography ==
Giering studied at the HFF Potsdam. He starred in a production of The Secret Diary of Adrian Mole and was cast by Austrian filmmaker, Michael Haneke for the TV movie, The Traitor and the 1997 films The Castle and Funny Games. Giering's portrayal of the psychopathic killer Peter in Funny Games was considered a breakout performance.

Giering was regularly seen in TV and cinema productions. His best known roles were in Sebastian Schipper's Absolute Giganten (1999) as Floyd, and in the film Baader (2002), portraying the leader of the Red Army Faction. Since 2006, Giering starred in the ZDF series Der Kriminalist as the Commissioner Henry Weber. He appeared in 30 episodes up until 2010.

== Death ==
Giering was found dead in his apartment in Berlin on 23 June 2010 of multiple organ failure due to an acute bilious colic. Giering had publicly discussed his struggles with alcoholism and emotional issues.

== Filmography ==
- 1996: Teenage Wolfpack (TV film)
- 1997: The Castle (TV film)
- 1997: Funny Games
- 1998: Tatort: Blick in den Abgrund (TV)
- 1998: Opernball (TV film)
- 1998: Das merkwürdige Verhalten geschlechtsreifer Großstädter zur Paarungszeit
- 1998: Und alles wegen Mama (TV film)
- 1999: Absolute Giganten
- 2000: Bloody Weekend
- 2000: Gran Paradiso
- 2000: Love Never Fails
- 2000: Exit to Heaven
- 2000: Ebene 9 (Short)
- 2002: Baader
- 2002: One Hell of a Night (TV film)
- 2003: The Curve (Short)
- 2003: Anatomy 2
- 2003: Hierankl
- 2004: Nightsongs
- 2004: The Rose Gardener (TV film)
- 2004–2006: Eva Blond (TV series, 4 episodes)
- 2006: Esperanza
- 2006: A Pirate's Heart (TV film)
- 2006–2011: Der Kriminalist (TV series, 36 episodes)
- 2007: Free to Leave
- 2008: Tatort: Der glückliche Tod (TV)
- 2009: Lasko – Die Faust Gottes (TV series): Der Fluch
- 2009: Don't Be Afraid (TV film)
- 2009: Die Bremer Stadtmusikanten (TV film)
