= Elmar Wepper =

German actor (1944–2023)

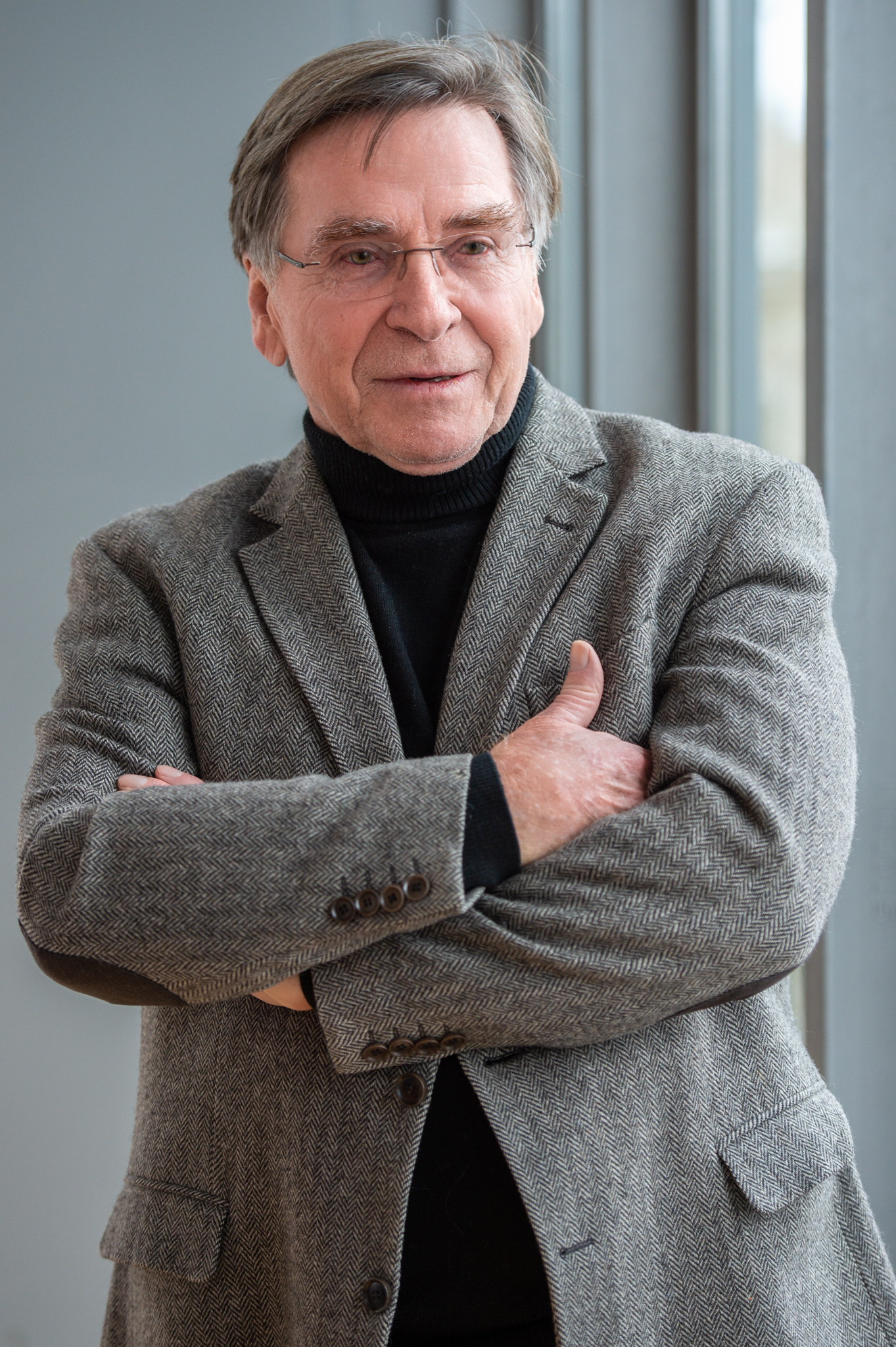
- Wepper in 2019
- Born: 16 April 1944; Augsburg, Germany
- Died: 31 October 2023 (aged 79); Munich, Germany
- Occupation: Actor
- Relatives: Fritz Wepper (brother); Sophie Wepper (niece)

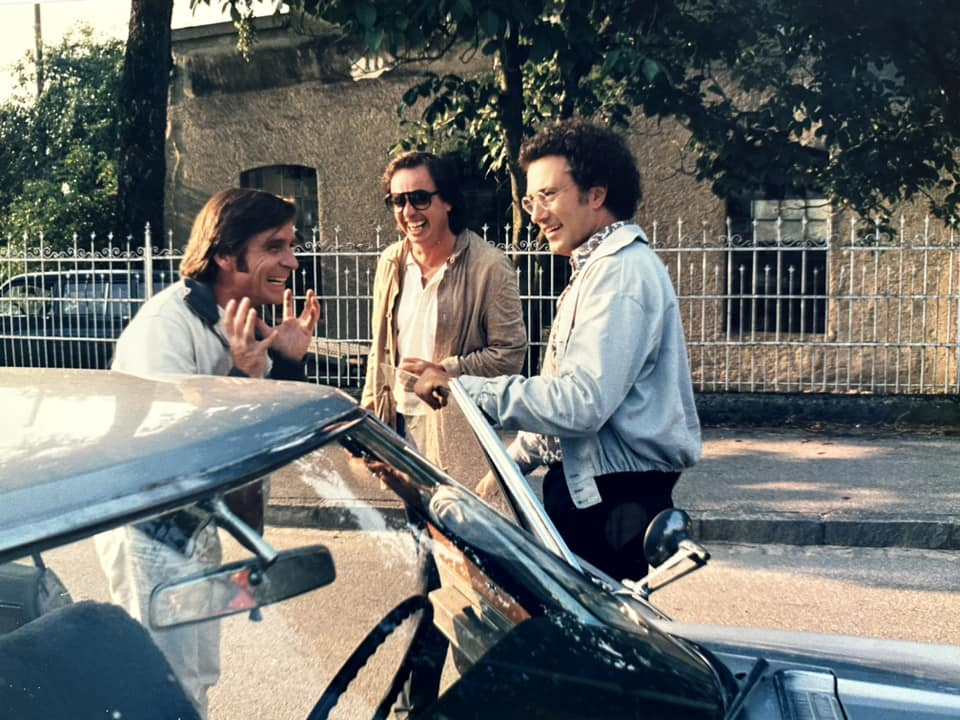
Elmar Wepper with director Franz Xaver Bogner and Robert Giggenbach filming Irgendwie und Sowieso in Albaching

Elmar Wepper (16 April 1944 – 31 October 2023) was a German actor.

== Life and career ==
Elmar Wepper was born in Augsburg and grew up in Munich. After his Abitur, he studied German language and literature and theatre studies.

His television credits include Der Kommissar, Unsere schönsten Jahre and Zwei Münchner in Hamburg. In 2008, Wepper played the main role in the film Cherry Blossoms directed by Doris Dörrie, his performance in this film was seen as one of his career highlights. He was also known for dubbing Mel Gibson's voice since the 1980s.

Wepper was a supporter of FC Bayern Munich. He died on 31 October 2023, at the age of 79, following a sudden heart failure. He was the younger brother of actor Fritz Wepper.

== Awards ==
- 2007 Bavarian Film Award (Best actor)
- 2008 German Film Award (Best Actor)
- 2019 Bavarian Film Award (together with his brother Fritz for life achievement)

== Selected filmography ==
Year	Title	Role	Notes
2001	Lammbock	Vater Becker	
2008	Cherry Blossoms	Rudi Angermeier	
2011	Three Quarter Moon		
2018	As Green As It Gets		
