= Jan Costin Wagner =

German crime fiction writer (born 1972)

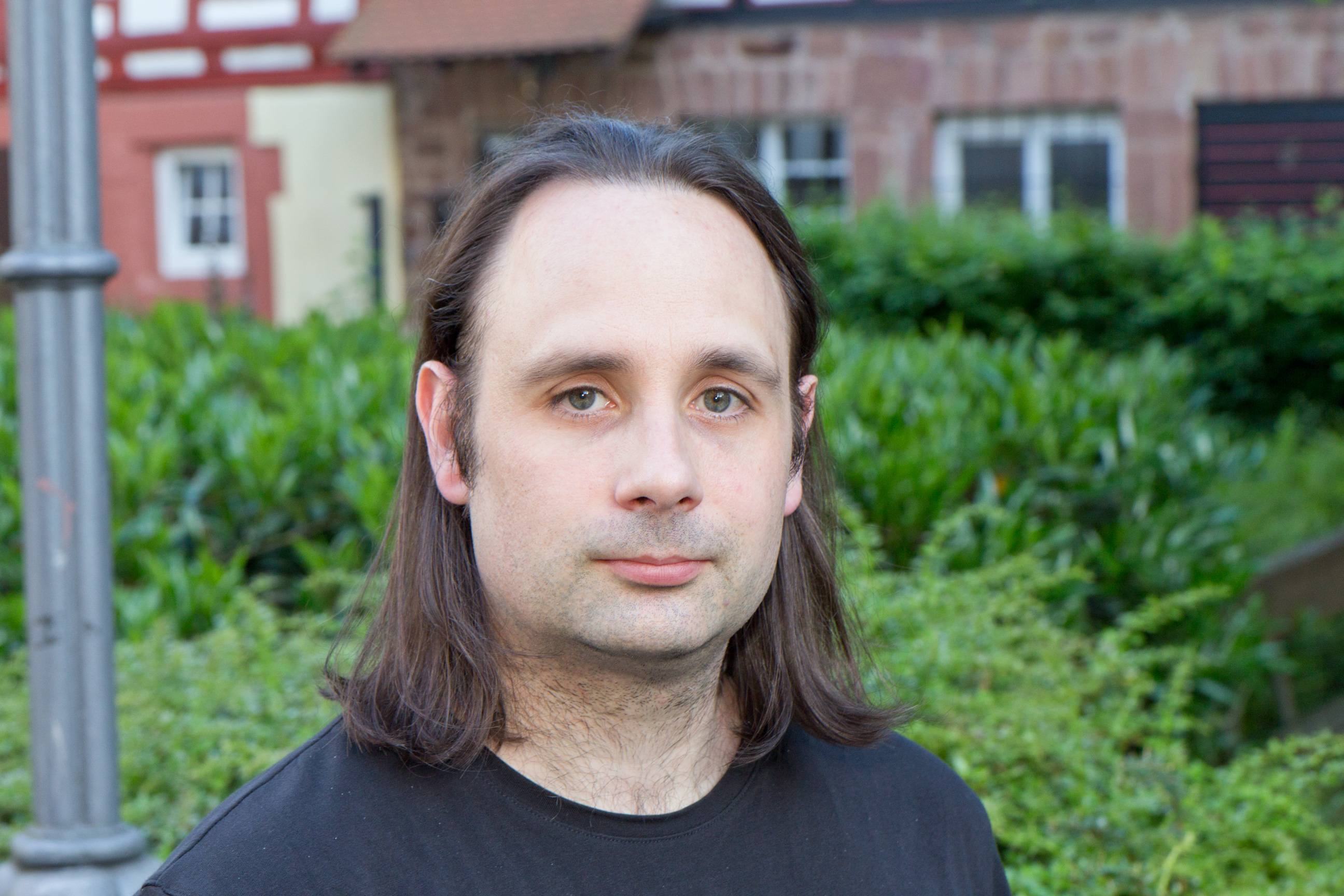
Jan Costin Wagner, 2012

Jan Costin Wagner (born 13 October 1972 in Langen) is a German crime fiction writer. His novels are set in Finland and feature detective Kimmo Joentaa.

== Biography ==
Wagner studied German Literature and History at university in Frankfurt, and later worked as a journalist. His first novel, "Nachtfahrt" (Night Trip) was published to much acclaim in 2002 and won the Marlowe Prize for Best Crime Novel. His wife is a native of Finland, and they spend time both there and in Germany. His 2007 novel The Silence (German: Das Schweigen) was adapted into the 2010 German film of the same name in English; the original name of the film in German is Das letzte Schweigen, i.e. The last Silence.

== Bibliography ==
- Eismond 2003, (Ice Moon, translated to English 2005)
- Das Schweigen 2007 (Silence, translated to English 2010)
- Im Winter der Löwen 2009 (The Winter of the Lions, translated to English 2011)
- Light in a Dark House (2013)
