= Eierdiebe =

2003 film

- Directed by: Robert Schwentke
- Written by: Robert Schwentke
- Starring: Wotan Wilke Möhring
- Cinematography: Florian Ballhaus
- Edited by: Hans Funck
- Music by: Martin Todsharow
- Distributed by: Tobis Film
- Release dates: 16 February 2003 (Berlinale); 22 January 2004 (Germany)
- Running time: 87 minutes
- Country: Germany
- Language: German

Eierdiebe (The Family Jewels in United States) is a 2003 German comedy-drama film written and directed by Robert Schwentke. The film deals with testicular cancer, which Schwentke suffered through and survived.
