= Christian Zübert =

German film director and screenwriter (born 1973)

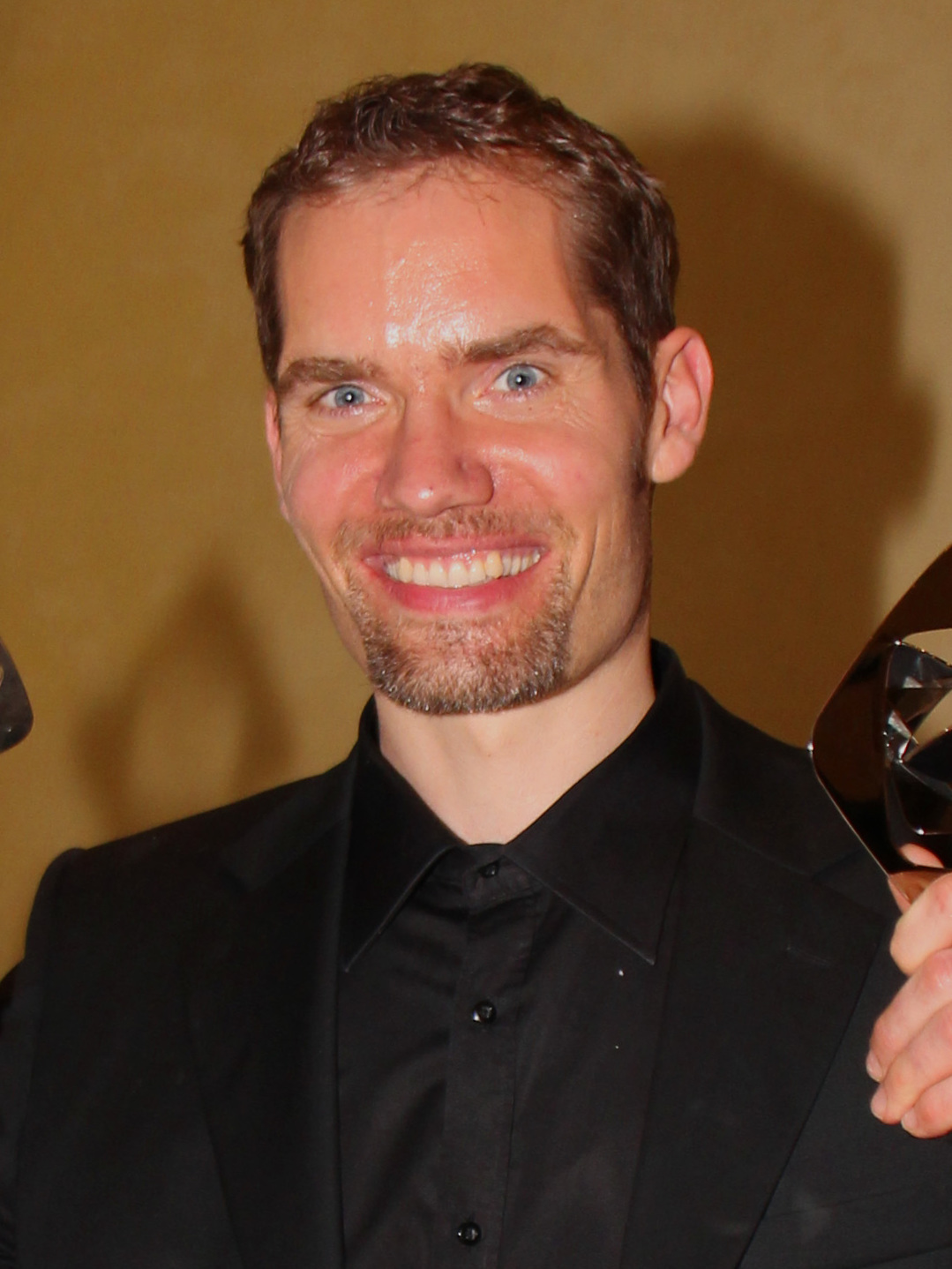
- Zübert at the 2011 Grimme-Preis awards
- Born: 1973 (age 52–53); Würzburg, West Germany
- Occupations: Film director, screenwriter
- Years active: 1997–present

Christian Zübert (born 1973, Würzburg) is a German film director and screenwriter.

== Career ==
Zübert started out as a screenwriter for German television. In 2000 he directed and wrote his first feature Lammbock, which was a surprise hit in Germany with over one million admissions. That same year he wrote the script for Mädchen, Mädchen, which was a box office hit.

In 2004, he directed the children's adventure movie Der Schatz der weißen Falken which received many awards and played numerous international festivals. After directing and writing award-winning movies and series for television, e.g. the Tatort crime thriller Nie wieder frei sein, Zübert returned to the big screen in 2010 with the comedy-drama Dreiviertelmond (Three Quarter Moon), which was nominated for the German Film Award, won the Bavarian Film Award and the Director's Guild of Germany Metropolis Award and was screened in many international festivals.

His 2013 effort Tour de Force had its premiere on the Grand Piazza of the Locarno International Film Festival and its North American Premiere on the Toronto International Film Festival, where he returned the following year with his German-Greek drama One Breath.

He wrote and directed the Netflix thriller Exterritorial which opened in 2025 to mostly positive reviews. According to FlixPatrol, the film reached number one on the Netflix charts in 79 countries on May 2, 2025. After six weeks the film ranks on number five of the Netflix all time Top Ten with over 83 Million views. It is the most successful german film on Netflix.

== Selected filmography ==
=== Director ===
- Lammbock (2001)
- Echte Männer? (2003, TV film)
- Was nicht passt, wird passend gemacht (2003, TV series, 3 episodes)
- Der Schatz der weißen Falken (2005)
- Hardcover (2008)
- KDD – Kriminaldauerdienst (2010, TV series, 3 episodes)
- Tatort: Nie wieder frei sein (2010, TV series episode)
- Three Quarter Moon (2011)
- Tour de Force (2014)
- One Breath (2015)
- Lommbock (2017)
- Arthurs Gesetz (2018, TV series, 6 episodes)
- Bad Banks (2020, TV series, 6 episodes)
- Exterritorial (2025)

=== Screenwriter ===
- Der Clown (1998–2001, TV series, 15 episodes)
- Mädchen, Mädchen (dir. Dennis Gansel, 2001)
- Lammbock (dir. Christian Zübert, 2001)
- Absolut das Leben (2002–2006, TV series, 10 episodes)
- Echte Männer? (dir. Christian Zübert, 2003, TV film)
- Der Schatz der weißen Falken (dir. Christian Zübert, 2005)
- 30 Something (dir. Annette Ernst, 2006, TV film)
- Vollidiot (dir. Tobi Baumann, 2007) — based on a novel by Tommy Jaud
- Die Rote Zora (dir. Peter Kahane, 2008) — based on The Outsiders of Uskoken Castle by Kurt Held
- Don Quixote (dir. Sibylle Tafel, 2008, TV film)
- Hardcover (dir. Christian Zübert, 2008)
- Hangtime (dir. Wolfgang Groos, 2009)
- Neue Vahr Süd (dir. Hermine Huntgeburth, 2010, TV film) — based on a novel by Sven Regener
- Three Quarter Moon (dir. Christian Zübert, 2011)
- Dampfnudelblues (dir. Ed Herzog, 2013) — based on a novel by Rita Falk
- One Breath (dir. Christian Zübert, 2015)
- Lommbock (dir. Christian Zübert, 2017)
- The Collini Case (dir. Marco Kreuzpaintner, 2019) — based on a novel by Ferdinand von Schirach
- Exterritorial (dir. Christian Zübert, 2025)
