= KDD – Kriminaldauerdienst =

German police procedural series

- Also known as: KDD – Berlin Crime Squad
- Genre: Police procedural Serial drama
- Created by: Orkun Ertener
- Written by: Orkun Ertener; Lars Kraume; Oliver Hein; Edward Berger; Matthias Glasner; Falko Löffler
- Starring: Götz Schubert; Saskia Vester; Manfred Zapatka; Barnaby Metschurat; Melika Foroutan; Billey Demirtas; Jördis Triebel
- Opening theme: "KDD Thema"
- Composers: Christoph M. Kaiser; Julian Maas
- Country of origin: Germany
- Original language: German
- No. of seasons: 3
- No. of episodes: 28

Production
- Executive producer: Kathrin Breininger
- Camera setup: Multi-camera
- Running time: approx. 45 minutes
- Production companies: Hofman & Voges

Original release
- Network: ZDF (season 1 & 2) arte (season 3)
- Release: February 2, 2007 – March 2, 2010

KDD – Berlin Crime Squad, German title KDD – Kriminaldauerdienst is a German television series that was broadcast from 2007 to 2010. The series differs from typical police procedurals by focusing on the daily work life and the private problems of the main characters instead of following a "case of the week" scheme, and because of the overarching storylines spanning one or several seasons. Due to its uncommon dramaturgy and its ambiguous drawing of the main characters, it was critically lauded and received several accolades. However, as the limited number of viewers underperformed expectations, the series was cancelled after three seasons.

Filmmaker Edward Berger, who later made Oscar and BAFTA-winning film All Quiet on the Western Front, directed and co-wrote several episodes of Season 2.

== Series premise ==
In German law enforcement, the "Kriminaldauerdienst” is a 24/7 stand-by service of the Kriminalpolizei (responsible for criminal investigations). Divided into a day and night shift, the officers of the Kriminaldauerdienst are responsible for collecting information about a crime with the ultimate goal of referring it to the responsible units (unless the crime can be solved during the shift). In reality, Berlin, unlike other major cities such as Munich, Hamburg or Cologne, has no such service.

== Plot ==
The series follows the story of the fictional day-shift squad of the Berlin “Kriminaldauerdienst” (Crime Squad) in the problematic quarter Kreuzberg. It can be divided into three narrative levels; a plot spanning all three seasons is a corruption case within the Berlin police that the officers of the Berlin Crime Squad investigate, additionally, the show follows the private lives of the investigators, and the criminal cases they are confronted with every day.

The main characters of the show are the seven officers of the Berlin Crime Squad:

- Kriminalhauptkommissar Helmut Enders (Götz Schubert)
- Kriminaloberkommissar Jan Haroska (Manfred Zapatka)
- Kriminaloberkommissarin Kristin Bender (Saskia Vester)
- Kriminalkommissar Leo Falckenstein (Barnaby Metschurat)
- Kriminalkommissarin Sylvia Henke (Melika Foroutan)
- Kriminalkommissar Mehmet Kilic (Billey Demirtas)
- Polizeikommissarin (later Polizeioberkommissarin) Maria Hernandez (Jördis Triebel)

=== Season 1 ===
In season 1, Jan Haroska embezzles drug money from the crime scene of an explosion in order to help his estranged daughter − and thus his grandson − who is in debt after her husband's suicide. However, the money belonged to the Russian drug dealer Han who now looks frantically for it which endangers Haroska's life and that of his family.
The explosion was orchestrated by another drug dealer, Aoun, to put his rival in his place. The investigation is reassigned from the KDD to the Landeskriminalamt and led by Rainer Sallek who, together with the Berlin Chief of Police, is in business with Aoun. Refusing to let go of the investigation, Enders and his team start to uncover the corruption. In the season finale, the squad is attacked by snipers belonging to the drug mafia during an undercover operation at the Gendarmenmarkt, ending the season with a cliffhanger.
Other storylines include the relationship between Haroska and Maria Hernandez, as well as Sylvia Henke, who is kidnapped and raped. Kristin Bender takes a liking to Enes, an adolescent fugitive from Kosovo who has to steal to support himself.

=== Season 2 ===
In season 2, the squad continues investigating the corruption case. Helmut Enders relies on the contacts of Armin Ponew, a former cop who now is involved in manipulated sports betting in the Fußball-Regionalliga (football regional league); as a result, Enders himself becomes entangled in criminal activities.
Additionally, Jan Haroska is forced to leave the KDD because of his relapse into alcoholism and the show chronicles his attempts to sober up and rejoin the police force. Also, Sylvia Henke has difficulties coping with the aftermaths of her rape. Kristin Bender makes an effort to adopt Enes as her foster child.

=== Season 3 ===
The third season is very focused on the character of Mehmet Kilic who has developed a cocaine addiction and works in a night club to support his drug habit.
When an undercover police officer is killed by a weapons dealer, Kilic is asked to go undercover as the victim and he were in the same club that night. Kilic is tested in his loyalty to his colleagues on the one hand, and the Turkish club owner who is his friend, on the other hand. The series finale depicts a hostage crisis in the KDD precinct; however, the episode does not present a series finale in a classical sense, but rather another cut within the show's story, with the ending remaining open in many aspects.

== Cast and characters ==
Role	Actor	Seasons	Episode count	Notes
Main cast
Helmut Enders	Götz Schubert	1–3	28	Head of the squad
Kristin Bender	Saskia Vester	1–3	28	Enders' deputy who hides her homosexuality from her colleagues
Jan Haroska	Manfred Zapatka	1–3	27	Experienced police officer and a sober alcoholic who relapses sometimes
Leo Falckenstein	Barnaby Metschurat	1–3	28	Son of a wealthy newspaper publisher
Sylvia Henke	Melika Foroutan	1–3	27	Former vice investigator who is – sometimes ruthlessly – career-driven
Mehmet Kilic	Billey Demirtas	1–3	27	Police officer who is torn between his German and Turkish identity
Maria Hernandez	Jördis Triebel	1–3	26	Uniformed police officer
Recurring cast
Karsten Stieglitz	Michael Rotschopf	1–3	19	Internal Affairs investigator
Sabine Enders	Johanna Gastdorf	1–3	16	Wife (then ex-wife) of Helmut Enders
Enes	Edin Hasanović	1–3	16	an adolescent fugitive from Kosovo who is taken in by Kristin Bender
Wolfgang Jacobi	Bernhard Schütz	1, 2	12	Berlin's corrupt Chief of Police who aims for a political career
Maren Enders	Anna Fischer	1–3	10	Daughter of Helmut Enders. Fischer also portrayed Lisa Enders, Maren's twin sister, in the first episode
Han	Jürgen Vogel	1, 2	10	A drug dealer seeking to dominate the market in Berlin
Rainer Sallek	Christian Redl	1	9	High-ranking official of the Landeskriminalamt Berlin who works for Jacobi
Karen Mornau	Alma Leiberg	1, 2	9	Police officer who works temporarily in the squad
Armin Ponew	Jürgen Tarrach	2	7	A former policeman-turned crook on whose contacts Enders relies to incriminate Jacobi
Frank Döring	Tobias Oertel	2	6	Temporary partner of Leo Falckenstein
Carla Wagner	Henny Reents	2, 3	5	An LKA official investigating illegal gambling
Androsch	Tom Schilling	1	5	Han's lover
Martina Beck	Nina Kronjäger	3	4	Former lover of Enders. Her husband's murder during an undercover operation is investigated in season 3
Aoun	André Hennicke	1	4	Drug kingpin who is in a "tit for tat" business with Jacobi and Sallek, Han's rival

Other important characters include:

- Marlies Haroska (Sandra Borgmann), Jan Haroska's daughter
- Kristin Bender's significant others
  - Petra Kirchhoff (Julika Jenkins) in season 1
  - Thomas Behrens (Martin Brambach) in season 2
  - Müjde (Adriana Altaras) in season 3
- Axel Falckenstein (Falk Rockstroh), Leo Falckenstein's father
- Mia (Charleen Deetz), Sylvia Henke's daughter
- In Mehmet Kilic's private life
  - Elif Kilic (Sıla Şahin), his wife from Turkey
  - Timur (Elyas M'Barek), Elif's secret fiancé
  - Rüya Deniz (İdil Üner), Kilic's emancipated girlfriend (seasons 2 and 3)
  - Veli Gür (Bülent Sharif), a club owner for whom he works in season 3
- The partners of Maria Hernandez
  - Stefan Mahler (Daniel Zillmann) in season 1, shot on duty
  - Keitel (Devid Striesow) in season 2
  - Nicole Ries (Laura Tonke) in season 3

== Production and broadcasting ==
The series was primarily shot in the Berlin neighborhoods of Kreuzberg and Neukölln. For the exterior shots of the KDD precinct, the old building of the Heeresbäckerei Berlin was used whereas the interior scenes were shot a studio close to the Berlin Tegel Airport.

Season 1, consisting of a pilot episode with a length of 90 minutes and 10 episodes, was broadcast from February 2, 2007 to April 20, 2007 on ZDF. Season 2, containing 9 episodes, was broadcast from May 2, 2008 to July 4, 2008.
Shooting on season 3 began in October 2008. On November 17, 2009, the ZDF announced that the series would not be renewed for a fourth season. Because the third season was co-financed by arte, the channel had the rights to first run, showing the episodes from January 12, 2010 to March 2, 2010. The final season aired on ZDF from April 9, 2010 to May 21, 2010.

=== International broadcast ===
The series was broadcast in French on arte under the title KDD – Berlin Brigade Criminelle. In 2010, the series was sold to Eurochannel and was first broadcast on the Canadian Eurochannel in October 2010 as KDD – Berlin Crime Squad Eurochannel then went on to broadcast it in Spanish-speaking countries (KDD: Policia de Investigación), Portuguese-speaking countries (KDD: Policia Investigativa de Berlim), French-speaking countries and on the Polish Eurochannel (KDD: Berlinski Oddzial Kryminalny).

=== Narrative and visual style ===
The series differed from many German television series due to its rapid narrative pace, the complexity and thickness of the plot and the subject matters (which included forced marriage, euthanasia, rape, gambling addiction, child sexual abuse and abuse of elderly in nursing homes).

The series was shot with two cameras to enhance the dynamic and achieve a more fluent way of acting. Another characteristic was the coloring of the series, which was kept in livid shades of green and beige, which was likened to modern American television series such as The Wire. The minimalistic and electronic soundtrack also contributed to the exceptional style of KDD – Berlin Crime Squad.

== Reception ==
=== Critical response ===
KDD – Kriminaldauerdienst was received almost unanimously well by critics. They were particularly impressed with the series' narrative pace ("The series has this high narrative pace known from American TV series", Süddeutsche Zeitung) and the complex stories ("...The era of ironing in front of the television is over...").
The series' challenging of German crime series traditions was also lauded: "Does one really want the world to be kept in order by people who cannot even get their own lives together? A question that is especially disturbing on Friday nights in the ZDF. Here, investigations are usually carried with a state-underpinning noblesse [...] The integrity of the investigators was yet always guaranteed during the “fire place hour” of crime entertainment", contemplated Christian Buß in the Spiegel. KDD was called "by far the best of the current German crime genre" and was praised for its realism.

=== Audience response ===
Despite the acclaim and enthusiasm with which KDD was received by critics, the series proved unsuccessful with the television audience. Airing on Friday nights where the ZDF traditionally shows crime series, the viewing figures corresponded to the average ZDF share, but were far inferior to that of the other crime series shown the same night.

Series creator Orkun Ertener mused that the show was "...too complex, too fast, too dark, too immoral" for the German audience and voiced his fear that ambitious series such as KDD will never be successful in Germany: "...We will most likely never gain upon Great Britain and the US that are setting the standards". The magazine Stern called KDD – Kriminaldauerdienst a series caught "in the quality trap".

== Awards and nominations ==
- Deutscher Fernsehpreis
  - 2007: Best Series
  - 2008: Nomination for Best Series
  - 2008: Nomination for Best Music (Christoph M. Kaiser, Julian Maas)
- Adolf-Grimme-Preis
  - 2008: Distinguished in the category Fiction
- Bayerischer Fernsehpreis (Bavarian TV Awards)
  - 2007: Best Actress (Saskia Vester)
  - 2008: Best Actor (Manfred Zapatka)
- International TV Broadcasting & Film Awards (New York Festivals)
  - 2008: Bronze World Award, Category Television Entertainment Programs | Drama (Pilot episode)

== Episode list ==
Title	Series #	Season #	Directed by	Written by	Original air date
Season 1 (2007)
"Auf schmalem Grat"	1	1	Matthias Glasner	Orkun Ertener	February 2, 2007
"Unversöhnlich"	2	2	Matthias Glasner	Orkun Ertener	February 9, 2007
"Unter Druck"	3	3	Matthias Glasner	Orkun Ertener & Falko Löffler	February 16, 2007
"Am Ende des Weges"	4	4	Lars Kraume	Orkun Ertener	February 23, 2007
"Vertrauen"	5	5	Lars Kraume	Orkun Ertener	March 2, 2007
"Verwirrungen"	6	6	Lars Kraume	Orkun Ertener	March 9, 2007
"Enttäuschungen"	7	7	Lars Kraume	Orkun Ertener	March 16, 2007
"Rückkehr"	8	8	Filippos Tsitos	Orkun Ertener	March 23, 2007
"Veränderungen"	9	9	Filippos Tsitos	Matthias Glasner	March 30, 2007
"Verantwortung"	10	10	Filippos Tsitos	Orkun Ertener	April 13, 2007
"Fragen der Ehre"	11	11	Filippos Tsitos	Orkun Ertener	April 20, 2007
Season 2 (2008)
"Am Abgrund"	12	1	Edward Berger	Edward Berger & Oliver Hein	May 2, 2008
"Schatten"	13	2	Edward Berger	Lars Kraume	May 9, 2008
"Geständnisse"	14	3	Edward Berger	Lars Kraume	May 16, 2008
"Im Zwielicht"	15	4	Andreas Prochaska	Lars Kraume	May 23, 2008
"Letzte Chance"	16	5	Andreas Prochaska	Lars Kraume	May 30, 2008
"Verloren"	17	6	Andreas Prochaska	Orkun Ertener & Oliver Hein	June 6, 2008
"Aufbruch"	18	7	Züli Aladag	Edward Berger & Orkun Ertener	June 13, 2008
"Großer Tag"	20	9	Züli Aladag	Orkun Ertener	June 27, 2008
Season 3 (2010)
"Chancen, Teil 1"	21	1	Christian Zübert	Orkun Ertener	January 12, 2010 (arte)
"Chancen, Teil 2"	22	2	Christian Zübert	Orkun Ertener	January 19, 2010 (arte)
"Überraschungen"	23	3	Christian Zübert	Orkun Ertener	January 26, 2010 (arte)
"Sicherheit"	24	4	Christian Zübert	Orkun Ertener	February 2, 2010 (arte)
"Schlaflos"	25	5	Andreas Prochaska	Orkun Ertener	February 9, 2010 (arte)
"Schutz"	26	6	Andreas Prochaska	Orkun Ertener	February 16, 2010 (arte)
"Familie"	27	7	Andreas Prochaska	Orkun Ertener	February 23, 2010 (arte)
"Hoffnung"	28	8	Andreas Prochaska	Orkun Ertener	March 2, 2010 (arte)
