= Ghost Ship =

A ghost ship is a vessel with no living crew aboard.

Ghost Ship may also refer to:

== Film and television ==
- The Ghost Ship, a 1943 film
- Ghost Ship (1952 film), a British thriller
- Ghost Ship (2002 film), an American supernatural horror film
- "The Ghost Ship" (Stingray), a 1964 television episode
- "Ghost Ship" (MacGyver), a 1987 television episode
- "Ghost Ship" (Quantum Leap), a 1992 television episode

== Literature ==
- Ghost Ship (Cussler novel), 2014
- Ghost Ship (novel), a 2005 novel by Dietlof Reiche
- Ghost Ship (novella), a 2002 Doctor Who novella by Keith Topping
- Ghost Ship, a 1988 Star Trek: The Next Generation novel by Diane Carey
- The Ghost Ship, a 1990 book of poetry by Henry Hart
- "The Ghost Ship", a 1912 short story by Richard Barham Middleton
- Ghost Ship, a 2011 science fiction novel by Sharon Lee and Steve Miller

== Music ==
- Ghost Ship (Sultans album), 2000
- Ghost Ships (album), by James Reyne, 2007
- Ghost Ship (Theocracy album), 2016
- Ghostship EP, by The Fall of Troy, 2004
- Ghost Ship (band), a contemporary worship music band from Seattle
- "Ghost Ship", a song by Blur from the 2015 album The Magic Whip
- "Ghost Ship", a song by Nox Arcana from the 2008 Phantoms of the High Seas
- "Ghost Ship", a song by Robyn Hitchcock from the 1995 album You & Oblivion
- "Ghost Ship", a 2011 song by Neverending White Lights
- "Ghostship", a song by Shadow Gallery from the 2009 album Carved in Stone

== Other uses ==
- Ghost Ship (beer), by Adnams brewery
- Ghost Ship, an imprint of Seven Seas Entertainment
- Ghost Ship (sculpture), a 2001 sculpture in Portland, Oregon, U.S.
- Ghost Ship warehouse fire, Oakland, California, U.S., in 2016
- Juliet Marine Systems Ghost, an advanced super-cavitating stealth ship

== See also ==
- Ghost (disambiguation), for ships named "Ghost"
- Ghost boat (disambiguation)
- Death Ship (disambiguation)
- Phantom Ship (disambiguation)
