= Käptn Blaubär =

Figure by Walter Moers

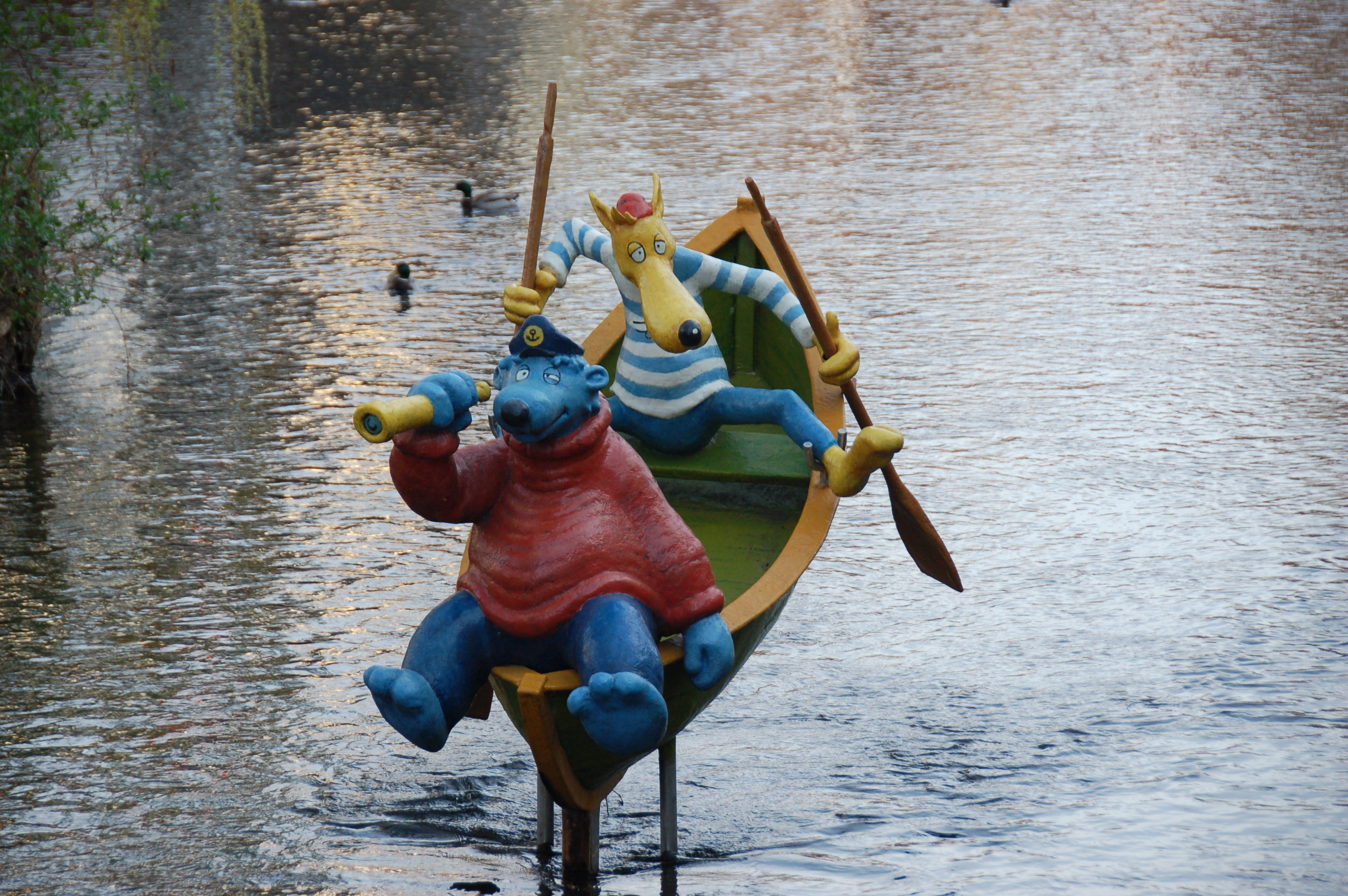
Captain Bluebear and Hein Blöd on the Gera in Erfurt

Käpt'n Blaubär is a fictional character created by German novelist and comic artist Walter Moers. He is an anthropomorphic talking bear with blue fur who originally appeared in the German children's television program Die Sendung mit der Maus, has since then appeared in a film, a novel, a stage musical and various other media, all of which chronicle the character's life as a sailor and adventurer. Outside of Germany, Captain Bluebear is best known for being the protagonist of Moers' novel The 13½ Lives of Captain Bluebear.

The name pokes fun at the relative homophony between the German vowel e and umlaut ä, when pronounced in a more colloquial, everyday style of language, especially in Northern Germany. In a compound noun the final -e from -beere (e.g. Erdbeere "strawberry", Himbeere "raspberry", etc.) would very often not be pronounced at all: Bär/Beer(e) - 'bear/berry' ... 'bluebear/blueberry'

== Die Sendung mit der Maus ==
Käptn Blaubär originally appeared in Käpt'n Blaubärs Seemannsgarn (“Captain Bluebear's Sailor's Yarn”), a regular segment in the educational children's television series Die Sendung mit der Maus. Other regular characters of the Seemannsgarn episodes are Bluebear's sailor companion Hein Blöd (an anthropomorphic rat whose name translates as “Harry Dim”) and his three grandchildren (little bears who have yellow, green and pink fur), all of which live with Bluebear in a ship stranded on a cliff. One episode would usually consist of Bluebear telling a cock-and-bull story to his grandchildren, with the frame narrative being made with animated puppets and Bluebear's story itself being a traditionally animated short film. The stories always take the form of a tall tale and usually have Captain Bluebear overcome some unbelievable obstacle or a seemingly all-powerful adversary who threatens to sink the Captain's ship. The little bears habitually doubt the veracity of their grandfather's tales, while Hein Blöd acts as a buffoon character.

The episodes sometimes contained allusions to other popular characters of German children's television like the Sandmännchen, and also to other aspects of Walter Moers' work, e.g. in some episodes one of the little bears wears a pin-back button of Moers' adult comic character Das Kleine Arschloch (The Little Asshole). Bluebear, Hein Blöd and the three little bears later became part of other children's TV shows as well, such as Käpt’n Blaubär Club and Blaubär und Blöd.

== Film and novel ==
In 1999, Captain Bluebear simultaneously appeared in a made-for-television feature film and in The 13½ Lives of Captain Bluebear, Walter Moers' first fantasy novel. The novel reveals that Bluebear is a Chromobear (Buntbär) and thus belongs to a fictional race of ursines who inhabit the continent of Zamonia, which became a regular setting for most of Moers' fantasy novels. The 13½ Lives of Captain Bluebear is presented as the autobiography of its eponymous hero, which nevertheless covers only the first half of his 27 lives—implying that the other half is covered by the television episodes and making the novel a kind of origin story for the character. The novel ends with Bluebear rescuing his fellow Chromobears from slavery. The Chromobears (although not Bluebear himself) return in Moers' second Zamonia novel Ensel and Krete, in which they are shown as having established a touristic paradise in their native forest that the Chromobears nevertheless rule in a militaristic, semi-totalitarian way. The novels depart from the concept of the television program in that they are suited not only for children, but for adult readers as well.

The traditionally animated film Käpt'n Blaubär – Der Film was written by Moers and directed by Hayo Freitag. It is based on the television episodes rather than the novel. Its plot centers around the mad scientist Prof. Dr. Feinfinger, who, in kidnapping the little bears, seeks revenge against their grandfather, who once thwarted Feinfinger's plan to achieve world domination. Feinfinger is voiced by German comedian Helge Schneider, who had previously participated in the film adaptations of Moers' Little Asshole character, while Bluebear's voice is provided by actor Wolfgang Völz, who already voice-acted the Bluebear puppet in the Seemannsgarn episodes. The film also features an end title theme written and performed by Berlin rock group Die Ärzte. Käpt'n Blaubär – Der Film was awarded a Deutscher Filmpreis in 2000 and grossed over $5.5 million in Germany.

== Musicals ==
In 2006, The 13½ Lives of Captain Bluebear was adapted into a stage musical composed by Martin Lingnau and written by Heiko Wohlgemuth. It premiered in the Musical Dome in Cologne. It was followed by two television musicals in 2008 and 2009 respectively, Die drei Bärchen und der blöde Wolf ("The Three Little Bears and the Dim Wolf") and Abenteuer im Pizzawald ("Adventures in the Pizza Forest"), both of which were in turn based on the television episodes.

In fall 2014 a Live-Musical by the name Käpt’n Blaubär – Das Kindermusical was created.

== Video games ==
In 2001, a Käptn Blaubär puzzle video game titled Käpt'n Blaubär: Die verrückte Schatzsuche (lit. 'Captain Bluebear: The Crazy Treasure Hunt') was developed by Shin'en Multimedia and published by Ravensburger for the Game Boy Color. By German publisher Tivola the game Bannig auf Zack was released on CD-ROM.
