= Ghost boat =

Ghost boat may refer to:

- Ghost ship, a vessel with no living crew aboard
- Ghostboat, a 2006 British television film
- Ghost boat investigation, into a boat that disappeared in the Mediterranean Sea in 2014

== See also ==
- Ghost Ship (disambiguation)
- Death Ship (disambiguation)
- Phantom Ship (disambiguation)
