= Princess Insomnia & the Nightmare-colored Night-mare =

2017 novel by Walter Moers

- Author: Walter Moers
- Original title: Prinzessin Insomnia & der alptraumfarbene Nachtmahr
- Illustrator: Lydia Rode
- Cover artist: Walter Moers
- Genre: Fantasy novel
- Published: 2017 (Albrecht Knaus Verlag) (German)
- Publication place: Germany
- Media type: Print (hardcover)
- Pages: 344
- ISBN: 978-3-813-50785-0 (first hardcover edition)
- Preceded by: The Labyrinth of Dreaming Books
- Followed by: Christmas on Lindworm Castle

Prinzessin Insomnia & der alptraumfarbene Nachtmahr (transl. Princess Insomnia and the Nightmare-Colored Night-mare or Princess Insomnia and the Nightmare-Colored Chimera) is the sixth novel in the Zamonia series written by German author Walter Moers. It is the first Zamonian novel that was not illustrated by the author himself but by the German artist and book illustrator Lydia Rode. The novel was published in August 2017.

The book is about Princess Dylia, who suffers from a mysterious illness that leads to insomnia, and her traveling companion, the night-mare Catastrofel Opal. As with the novels Ensel and Krete and The Alchemaster's Apprentice, the novel's in-universe author is Optimus Yarnspinner, with Walter Moers claiming to have merely translated it.

== Plot ==
Princess Insomnia begins with a detailed characterization of the princess, her circumstances and her mysterious illness, which leads to weeks of restless nights. Other symptoms include her senses becoming extremely heightened and her ability to perceive phenomena that are invisible to everyone else. At night, when all the inhabitants of her castle are asleep, she seeks out appropriate activities. She comes up with ever more creative ways to pass the extra time, such as inventing and exploring new words and imaginary worlds of her own creation.

One night, she encounters Catastrofel Opal, a night-mare who seemingly attempts to suffocate her by sitting on her chest. During the ensuing conversation, he tries to convince the princess that his destiny as a night-mare is to drive her inevitably into madness and ultimately to her demise. He assures her that a swift death would be the best outcome for her, suggesting that any resistance would only lead to him haunting her until she, driven to madness, finally takes her own life. However, as she resists, the night-mare takes Dylia on a journey to Amygdala, the part of her brain responsible for generating the feeling of fear.

On this journey, the pair experience a wide variety of events and dangerous situations. The intentions and true personality of the night-mare, who describes himself as immortal and an expert in the 'nightmare business', continue to be alluded to, but remain uncertain and unexplained until the end. At the same time, they repeatedly find themselves in situations in which Dylia even rescues him from otherwise hopeless predicaments, aided in part by the twilight dwarves who are well-disposed towards her.

At the end of their journey, they reach their destination, Amygdala. Once there, the night-mare tries to lure the princess into the dark heart of the night, the quickest way to madness. With broken resistance, she hands herself over to the Grillos, the inhabitants of Amygdala, to be carried by them into the dark center of the city. At the last moment, Catastrofel Opal changes his mind, pulls the princess out of the perilous area and shows her an escape route through which they can return to reality. Dylia wakes up in her bedroom, where the night-mare is already waiting for her in the next room. Throughout the book, it has been emphasized several times that it is impossible to get rid of a night-mare until it has achieved its goal of driving its victim to madness and subsequent death, with one exception: the victim must bring the night-mare to confront itself and ask itself to depart. While Catastrofel Opal continues to work on driving the princess mad, she manages to trick him into uttering the phrase "Oh, begone from my sight!" while he gazes at himself in a mirror. When he realizes this, he throws himself out of the window and shatters into a thousand pieces.

The book concludes with Dylia, whose hobby is interesting words - mostly foreign words - now, after a long search, finding her personal super-duperest word (or favorite word) to be her own name.

== Style ==
Moers describes Princess Insomnia as a somnambulistic fairy tale, which can therefore be categorized as a literary fairy tale similar to The Alchemaster's Apprentice and Ensel and Krete. The book ends with the death of the antagonist and thus the rescue of the heroine. In his previous novels, Moers describes such a happy ending as atypical for Zamonian literature.

In Princess Insomnia, Walter Moers once again works heavily with different types of wordplay, such as neologisms and anagrams. The clearest is the princess's name, Dylia, which is an anagram of illustrator Lydia Rode's first name.

The book is divided into 18 chapters, which are titled with Latin numerals.

The illustrations are fully colored throughout using watercolors.

== Background ==
After Walter Moers published The Labyrinth of Dreaming Books in 2011, he announced the third part of the trilogy. However, he postponed the publication date several times due to work on other projects. In the meantime, he announced the graphic novel for The City of Dreaming Books, which was published in two parts in November 2017 and January 2018, and the novel The Island of a Thousand Lighthouses. The latter was also postponed, however, as he began work on Princess Insomnia & the Nightmare-colored Night-mare after contacting Lydia Rode.

Princess Insomnia is the first publication by Lydia Rode, who has lived with chronic fatigue syndrome, which leads to insomnia, since age 17. She contacted Moers, whereupon the idea of a collaboration and later the novel was born. In the epilogue, Walter Moers describes how Lydia Rode and her illness served as inspiration for the novel, which, however, is not about the effects of the illness, but about the power of creativity.

== Release details ==
- Prinzessin Insomnia & der alptraumfarbene Nachtmahr, Albrecht Knaus Verlag, Munich 2017, ISBN 978-3-813-50785-0 (Hardcover)
- Prinzessin Insomnia & der alptraumfarbene Nachtmahr. Penguin, Munich 2018, ISBN ISBN 978-3-328-10334-9 (Paperback)
- Prinzessin Insomnia & der alptraumfarbene Nachtmahr. der Hörverlag, Hamburg 2017, ISBN 978-3-844-52809-1 (Audiobook)
- Prinzessin Insomnia & der alptraumfarbene Nachtmahr. Penguin Random House, 2017, ISBN 978-3-641-22013-6 (ePUB)

== Reception ==
The book remained in the top 10 of the Spiegel bestseller list for seven weeks, peaking at number two in its second week. It was controversially received by critics (and fans), with one major criticism for many being that the drawings were not by Moers himself.

In 2018, the audiobook, read by Andreas Fröhlich, won the Deutscher Hörbuchpreis (German Audiobook Prize), while the illustrations won the Deutscher Fantasy Preis (German Fantasy Prize).
