= Rumo and His Miraculous Adventures =

2003 novel by Walter Moers

- Author: Walter Moers
- Original title: Rumo & Die Wunder im Dunkeln
- Translator: John Brownjohn
- Illustrator: Walter Moers
- Cover artist: Walter Moers
- Language: German
- Genre: Fantasy novel
- Publisher: German: Piper Verlag GmbH. English: Overlook TP
- Publication date: 2003
- Publication place: Germany
- English publication date: 2004
- Media type: Print (hardcover)
- ISBN: 978-0-436-20529-3
- OCLC: 57692975

Rumo and His Miraculous Adventures is a fantasy novel, written and comically illustrated by German author Walter Moers and published in 2003. An English translation by John Brownjohn was published in 2004.

== Plot introduction ==
The events of this novel take place on the fictional continent of Zamonia, which is also featured in Moers' previous novel The 13½ Lives of Captain Bluebear. While Rumo is not a prequel to Bluebear, the two do have many parallel events and returning characters such as Volzotan Smyke, Professor Nightingale, and Fredda the Alpine Imp. There is also a character named Rumo in The 13½ Lives of Captain Bluebear which ís also the protagonist of Rumo and His Miraculous Adventures. This epic consists of two separate sections, with both sections together telling the tale of how Rumo the Wolperting became Zamonia's most illustrious hero.

== Plot summary ==
The first book chronicles Rumo's childhood, beginning with his puppyhood raised by Hackonian Dwarves, his capture and lengthy detainment by fearsome Demonocles on a floating island known as Roaming Rock, and his befriending fellow prisoner Volzotan Smyke. Smyke, a Shark Grub, gives him the name Rumo (also the name of one of Zamonia's most popular card games) and teaches him to speak, watching him grow into a Wolperting - a strong canine creature with small horns, high intelligence and unparalleled proficiency in combat. With Smyke's tactical ability and Rumo's strength and agility they are able to escape Roaming Rock but eventually decide to go their separate ways. While Smyke remains an important character, most of the remainder of the first book details Rumo's search for the source of the Silver Thread, a particular scent he visualizes as a thin silver ribbon. The Thread leads him to a city aptly named Wolperting, full of Wolpertings and intensely guarded. Rumo discovers the source of his Silver Thread - a beautiful female Wolperting named Rala. During his time in Wolperting Rumo attends school to learn swordsmanship and receives his first sword, a small, two-pronged, talking Demonic Sword. Desperately in love with Rala but incredibly bad at showing it, Rumo leaves Wolperting to make a token to gain her favor but upon his return, he discovers an empty city and an entrance to the Netherworld. Scenting the Silver Thread, Rumo descends into the dark to rescue the others.

The second book describes Rumo's journey to Netherworld/Hel—a kingdom ruled by Gornab the Ninety-Ninth, a cruel tyrant who is misshapen and insane. Among the inhabitants are the Dead Yetis, the Vrahoks, and Friftar, Gornab's right-hand man and translator who plans to overthrow the throne. General Tick-tock, a terrifying creation of metal and alchemy that leads the legendary Copper Killers, takes Rala from the abducted group of Wolpertings and uses her to perfect his machine of torture (the Metal Maiden). Rumo must fight his way across the Netherworld and back to rescue his kinsman from the horrors of Hel and save his beloved from her seemingly deadly fate.

== Reception ==
Publishers Weekly described it as an "exuberant, highly original fantasy" and stated: "Illustrated with the author's appealing line drawings and full of sly humor, this rambunctious novel will appeal to fans tired of the usual epic fantasy, though they should be prepared for some violence in the tradition of the Brothers Grimm." Colin Greenland of The Guardian wrote that Rumo "makes a perfectly appropriate, even charming object for the interest of the readers he is likely to attract" and called the novel "undemanding" yet "unpretentious, far from stupid, and demonstrably humane." Kirkus Reviews called it "amusing" but "too long by half."

== See also ==
- The 13½ Lives of Captain Bluebear
- The City of Dreaming Books
