= It's Good to Be King =

It's Good to be King may refer to:

- "It's Good to be King" (song), a song by Tom Petty from his 1994 album Wildflowers
- "It's Good to Be King", an episode of Stargate SG-1
- Good To Be King, a 2004 book by Michael Badnarik
- "It's good to be the king", a catch phrase from the 1981 Mel Brooks film History of the World, Part I

== See also ==
- The Good King (disambiguation)
