= John Brownjohn =

British literary translator (1929–2020)

- Born: John Maxwell Brownjohn; 11 April 1929; Rickmansworth, Hertfordshire, England
- Died: 6 January 2020 (aged 90)
- Occupation: Literary translator

John Maxwell Brownjohn (11 April 1929 – 6 January 2020) was a British literary translator.

== Career ==
John Brownjohn translated more than 160 books, and won the Schlegel-Tieck Prize for German translation three times and the Helen and Kurt Wolff Prize once.

== Film ==
Brownjohn also collaborated with the filmmaker Roman Polanski on Tess (1979), Pirates (1986), Bitter Moon (1992), The Ninth Gate (1999) and The Pianist (2002).

== Personal life ==
Brownjohn was born in Rickmansworth, Hertfordshire. He died in January 2020 at the age of 90.

== Selected works ==
- Frank Arnau: The Art of the Faker
- Marcel Beyer: The Karnau Tapes
- Willy Brandt: People and Politics: The Years, 1960-75 (Schlegel-Tieck Prize)
- Thomas Brussig: Heroes Like Us (Schlegel-Tieck Prize, Helen and Kurt Wolff Translator's Prize)
- Thomas Glavinic: Night Work
- Martin Gregor-Dellin: Richard Wagner: His Life, His Work, His Century
- Lothar Günther Buchheim: The Boat
- Hans Hellmut Kirst: The Night of the Generals
- Bodo Kirchhoff: Infanta (Schlegel-Tieck Prize)
- Georg Klein: Libidissi
- Walter Moers: The 13½ Lives of Captain Bluebear (2000)
- Walter Moers: A Wild Ride Through the Night (2004)
- Walter Moers: Rumo and His Miraculous Adventures (2004)
- Walter Moers: The City of Dreaming Books (2007)
- Walter Moers: The Alchemaster's Apprentice (2010)
- Dietlof Reiche: The Golden Hamster Saga, Ghost Ship (2005)
- Alain Claude Sulzer: A Perfect Waiter
- Leo Perutz: The Swedish Cavalier (Schlegel-Tieck Prize)
- Mario Giordano: Auntie Poldi and the Sicilian Lions
