= Golden Hamster Saga =

German children's book series

The Golden Hamster Saga
- Author: Dietlof Reiche
- Translator: John Brownjohn
- Illustrator: Joe Cepeda
- Cover artist: Wolf Erlbruch
- Country: Germany
- Language: German
- Genre: Children's literature
- Publisher: Beltz & Gelberg
- Published: 1998-2003
- Media type: Print
- No. of books: 5

The Golden Hamster Saga is a children's book series written by German author Dietlof Reiche, and translated by John Brownjohn. It was illustrated by Joe Cepeda. The series revolves around a golden hamster named Freddy Auratus, two silly guinea pigs named Enrico and Caruso, a black, civilized tomcat named Sir William, and Freddy's owner, Mr. John, who translates German to English.

All mammals (except humans) in this series communicate in Interanimal, a telepathic language. The only animal that can read and write is Freddy. He goes on adventures with his friends Sir William, Enrico, Caruso, and Tjark.

== Characters ==
- Freddy Auratus is a smart, golden hamster that can read and write, but only with a keyboard. He can talk in Interanimal, and other pets often ask him to type something to Mr. John for them.
- Enrico and Caruso, Enrico is a smaller guinea pig, while Caruso is a larger one, often taunt Freddy by saying guinea pigs are superior to golden hamsters. They enjoy singing songs, writing plays, and making animals laugh. They are named after the famous opera singer, Enrico Caruso.
- Sir William is a 'respectable' tom cat that says he will not kill an animal for food. He also always makes laws for the other pets to obey and is loyal to Mr. John. However, later in the series, Sir William catches mice.
- Mr. John, a human who takes care of all the pets, can understand Freddy by the words the hamster types on his computer.
- Tjark, first appearing in the fifth book, is a robotic hamster that was built by Goldoni, an Italian scientist. He is friends with Enrico, Caruso, and Sir William.
- Sophie, a young girl, was Freddy's original owner.

== Titles ==
The five books in the series are:

- I, Freddy follows Freddy going to a new home.
- Freddy in Peril - Freddy is stalked by an evil scientist.
- Freddy to the Rescue - Freddy saves some field hamsters.
- The Haunting of Freddy - Freddy is haunted by a ghost during his vacation at a castle.
- Freddy's Final Quest - Freddy must fight off Crusaders from the past to return to his own time

== Reception ==
Publishers Weekly called the first novel in the series "worth putting down on paper". Moreover, they write that "Brownjohn's [English] translation reads smoothly and captures the considerable wit of the narrative. Spare yet comical, Cepeda's line art reveals endearing views of Freddy and some inventive shots of his surroundings." The Australian Broadcasting Corporation review of the first book, described it as strong: "The empowering nature of literacy has been captured perfectly in this remarkable little autobiography of golden hamster, Freddy Auratus."
