= Costly =

Costly may refer to:

- Wikipedia:COSTLY

== People ==
- Anthony Costly (born 1954), Honduran footballer
- Carlo Costly (born 1982), Honduran footballer
- Marcel Costly (born 1995), German footballer

== Entertainment ==
- Costly (album), an album by Ghost Ship
- Costly (card game), a traditional English card game related to Cribbage
