= The Art of the Faker =

1959 book by Frank Arnau

- Title page for The Art of the Faker (1959)
- Author: Frank Arnau
- Original title: Kunst der Fälscher - Fälscher der Kunst. 3000 Jahre Betrug mit Antiquitäten
- Language: German
- Subject: Art forgery
- Genre: Non-fiction
- Publication date: 1959

The Art of the Faker is an influential 1959 book on art forgery by Frank Arnau.

== Editions and translations ==
- 1959 Kunst der Fälscher - Fälscher der Kunst. 3000 Jahre Betrug mit Antiquitäten. (Original German edition)
- 1960 L'Art des faussaires et les faussaires de l'art (French translation by Édith Vincent)
- 1960 Arte della falsificazione, falsificazione dell'arte (Italian translation by Piero Bernardini, published in Milan)
- 1961 The art of the faker: three thousand years of deception in art and antiques (English translation by J. Maxwell Brownjohn, published in London)
- 1961 El Arte De Falsificar El Arte : Tres Mil Años De Fraudes En El Comercio De Antigüedades (Spanish translation by Juan Godó Costa, published in Barcelona)

== See also ==
- Alceo Dossena
