= Das Experiment =

2001 German thriller film by Oliver Hirschbiegel

- Theatrical release poster
- Directed by: Oliver Hirschbiegel
- Written by: Mario Giordano; Don Bohlinger; Christoper Darnstädt
- Based on: Black Box by Mario Giordano
- Produced by: Marc Conrad; Norbert Preuss; Friedrich Wildfeuer
- Starring: Moritz Bleibtreu; Justus von Dohnányi; Christian Berkel; Oliver Stokowski; Andrea Sawatzki
- Cinematography: Rainer Klausmann
- Edited by: Hans Funck
- Music by: Alexander Bubenheim
- Production companies: Fanes Film; Senator Film Produktion; Seven Pictures; Typhoon
- Distributed by: Senator Film
- Release date: 8 March 2001
- Running time: 120 minutes
- Country: Germany
- Language: German
- Box office: US$11.6 million

Das Experiment (English: The Experiment) is a 2001 German drama thriller film directed by Oliver Hirschbiegel. It is based on Mario Giordano's novel Black Box and deals with a social experiment which resembles Philip Zimbardo's Stanford prison experiment of 1971.

== Plot ==
Former journalist and now taxi driver Tarek Fahd spots a newspaper ad seeking to recruit test subjects for a social experiment. Participants in a simulated prison situation stand to earn 4,000 German marks. The experiment is led by Professor Klaus Thon and his assistant, Dr. Jutta Grimm. He decides to join in.

Tarek participates as a journalist while wearing a pair of glasses with a built-in mini-camera. After a car accident he suffers shortly before the experiment, Tarek meets a woman called Dora. She spends the night with him and Tarek keeps thinking of her, shown in flashbacks. The 20 volunteers are divided into 12 prisoners and 8 guards, and are observed by a team of scientists.

In the experiment, the prisoners lose their civil rights and have to obey arbitrary rules, such as the obligation to completely finish their meals. The guards are given nightsticks, but are told not to use violence in any case. Each prisoner's name is taken away and replaced by a number. Tarek (prisoner number 77) initially refuses to acknowledge the guards' superiority by drinking the milk of one of his co-prisoners because of that prisoner's lactose intolerance, or by throwing his blanket out of his cell to provoke the guards. He befriends his cellmates Schütte and Steinhoff, this last one being an Air Force Major who is secretly monitoring the experiment on behalf of the German military. Psychological changes develop and the situation deteriorates. The circumstances seem to be escalating after only a few days. It becomes clear that limits are not only being reached, but being surpassed when the guards kidnap Tarek from his cell late in the night, order him to strip fully naked, shave his head bald and urinate on him.

The guards become excessively aware of their power and use the prisoners' fear to make them obedient. On both sides, one person is considered dominant. On the prisoners' side, this is Tarek, and on the guards' side, it is the quiet guard Berus, a sadist, whose motto during the experiment is: "Humiliation is the only way we can solve these troubles." From that moment on, the guards start to use more and more violence against the prisoners. The scientists engage in a discussion whether or not to abort the experiment. Dr. Grimm suggests putting an end to the alarming situation, but Professor Thon refuses to stop the experiment until the violence has reached a maximum.

Dora meanwhile returns to Tarek's apartment and discovers his participation contract for the experiment. She surprises him by showing up for a visit day. Tarek, who was forced to clean the toilet with his own clothes, implores the friendly guard Walther Bosch to slip her a message. Berus intercepts Bosch, however, and tells Dora that everything is all right and refuses to let Tarek see Dora.

The situation becomes critical and more violence occurs. The prisoners are being abused and their self-esteem is drastically decreased by the guards' power. Most of the violence is directed against Tarek and he is locked up in solitary confinement inside a "black box" resembling a safe. Schütte, protesting this, is beaten severely, bound and gagged with duct tape and forced to sit on a chair. Later he suffocates due to his bloody nose clogging up while gagged.

Bosch is beaten by the other guards for his "betrayal" and is put into confinement. Lars, a member of Thon's team, notices this and attempts to contact Professor Thon, who is attending a conference. The guards, who are aware that the professor cannot be reached by phone, are convinced by Berus that the entire situation is a test put up by Thon's team, in order to make the guards handle an exceptional situation. They take over control of the facility and capture Lars, Dr. Grimm and the other scientists, who are put into confinement as well, and gradually start their own prison in which they engage in brutally sadistic games with total control.

Dora comes to the facility a second time to speak to Tarek and is lured into a room by Berus, where he locks her up. Dr. Grimm is handcuffed and gagged with duct tape while the guard Eckert attempts to rape her. He is stopped by Tarek, who escaped from solitary confinement through the use of a screwdriver that he found inside the "black box". Tarek knocks down Eckert and frees Lars, Bosch, Steinhoff, Dr. Grimm and the other prisoners. They manage to escape by removing the wall paneling of one of the cells with the screwdriver. Meanwhile, Professor Thon hears Lars' desperate message in his voicemail and leaves for the facility.

Meanwhile, Steinhoff and Tarek stay behind in order to prevent Berus from coming after them. Professor Thon reaches the facility and demands an explanation from Eckert, who accidentally injures him with a pistol. The fleeing prisoners are ambushed by the guards and trapped. Bosch, who could not keep up with the others, loses his sanity and kills Eckert with a fire extinguisher. Dora then escapes the room she was locked up in, and steals Eckert's gun. She injures one of the guards while he is engaged in fighting Tarek and Steinhoff, leaving only Berus to fight them. Tarek incapacitates Berus, who is nearly choked to death by Steinhoff until Tarek convinces him not to kill Berus.

The film ends with a news break, confirming two deaths (Schütte and Eckert) and three severely injured (Thon, Berus, and Bosch). Both Berus and Thon will be put on trial, Berus for multiple homicides and torture with rape, and Thon for allowing an illegal and unethical experiment. In last scene Dora and Tarek are sitting together happily on a beach.

== Cast ==
- Moritz Bleibtreu as Tarek Fahd - Prisoner No. 77
- Justus von Dohnányi as Berus - Strafvollzugsbeamter / Guard
- Christian Berkel as Steinhoff - Prisoner No. 38
- Oliver Stokowski as Schütte - Prisoner No. 82
- Andrea Sawatzki as Dr. Jutta Grimm - Scientist and Dr. Thon's girlfriend
- Wotan Wilke Möhring as Joe - Prisoner No. 69
- Stephan Szasz as Prisoner No. 53
- Polat Dal as Prisoner No. 40
- Danny Richter as Prisoner No. 21
- Ralf Müller as Prisoner No. 18
- Markus Rudolf as Prisoner No. 74
- Peter Fieseler as Prisoner No. 11
- Thorsten J.H. Dersch as Prisoner No. 86
- Sven Grefer as Prisoner No. 94
- Nicki von Tempelhoff as Kamps - Guard
- Timo Dierkes as Eckert - Guard
- Antoine Monot, Jr. as Bosch - Guard
- Lars Gärtner as Renzel - Guard
- Jacek Klimontko as Gläser - Guard
- Markus Klauk as Stock - Guard
- Ralph Püttmann as Amandy - Guard
- Edgar Selge as Professor Dr. Klaus Thon - Wissenschaftler / Scientist / Leader of the experiment
- Philipp Hochmair as Lars - Scientist
- Klaus Spinnler as Assistant
- Tristan Vostry as Assistant
- Maren Eggert as Dora - Tarek's girlfriend
- André Jung as Ziegler - Media owner for whom Tarek secretly works
- Uwe Rohde as Hans - The Others
- Heiner Lauterbach as Dennis - The Voices
- Fatih Akin as Taxi Driver - The Voices
- Christiane Gerboth as Newscaster - The Voices

== Production ==
The film was inspired by the events of the Stanford prison experiment in the US. It is based on the novel Black Box by Mario Giordano.

== Release and reception ==
Das Experiment premiered on 7 March 2001 in Berlin and was released with a theatrical release in Germany one day later. In the UK it was released on 22 March 2002 as The Experiment and in the United States on 20 September 2002.

In a positive review, Roger Ebert stated that he was impressed by the film's effectiveness, even though he viewed its outcome as predetermined. According to Karen Durbin of the New York Times, the movie can be seen as an allegory for the rise of authoritarian governments such as the Nazi regime.

== Remake ==
An American remake released in 2010 was directed by Paul Scheuring and stars Adrien Brody, Forest Whitaker, Maggie Grace, and Cam Gigandet. Filming began in Iowa in July 2009. When the film was still shooting, the North American distribution rights were acquired by Sony Pictures Worldwide Acquisitions Group, which released the film direct-to-video in the United States on 21 September 2010 through its Stage 6 Films label.

== See also ==
- List of films featuring surveillance
