= Blaubär und Blöd =

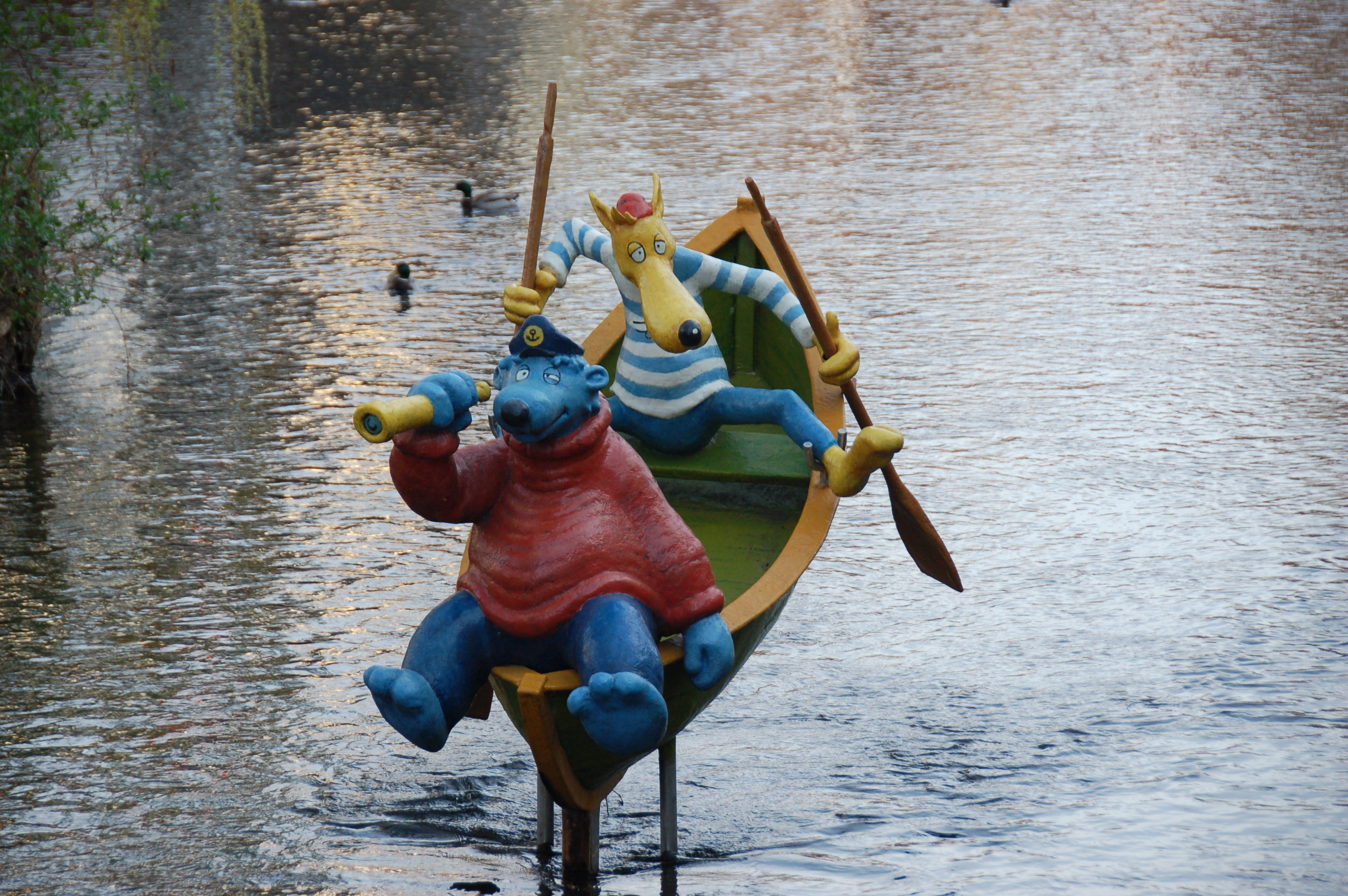
- Captain Bluebear and Hein Blöd on the Gera in Erfurt
- Created by: Thomas Menke
- Country of origin: Germany
- No. of episodes: 86

Original release
- Network: Westdeutscher Rundfunk
- Release: 2002 – 2008

Blaubär und Blöd is a German children's comedy television series which aired from 14 September 2002 to 17 February 2008. The series is based on the novels by German author Walter Moers.

== See also ==
- Käpt’n Blaubär Club (1993 – 2001)
- List of German television series

== Literature ==
- Michael Reufsteck; Stefan Niggemaier (2005). Das Fernsehlexikon. Alles über 7000 Sendungen von Ally McBeal bis zur ZDF Hitparade. Goldmann-Verlag. ISBN 3-442-30124-6.
