= Die Dame im Chinchilla =

1961 detective fiction novel by Frank Arnau

- First edition (publ. Ullstein Verlag)
- Author: Frank Arnau
- Publication date: 1961

Die Dame im Chinchilla (1961) is a detective fiction novel by German writer Frank Arnau. It was translated into Dutch as De vrouw in chinchilla.

== Plot summary ==
The body of a murdered woman is discovered in a New York apartment. Her luxurious bedroom has been thoroughly searched, and expensive clothes are lying around. Chief Inspector David Brewer knows that the victim lived on the edge of crime. In a previous life, she was a stripper and the owner of a night club that got mentioned in a call-girl scandal. Her name also came up in a case involving hard drugs. All motives are present for murder.
