= Contest (1932 film) =

1932 film directed by Erich Schönfelder

- German: Kampf
- Directed by: Erich Schönfelder
- Written by: Frank Arnau; Heinz Gordon; Franz Roswalt; Bob Stoll; Max Wallner
- Produced by: Haro van Peski
- Starring: Manfred von Brauchitsch; Evelyn Holt; Kurt Vespermann
- Cinematography: Willy Winterstein
- Music by: Marc Roland
- Production company: Majestic-Film
- Distributed by: UFA
- Release date: 20 December 1932
- Running time: 87 minutes
- Country: Germany
- Language: German

Contest (German: Kampf) is a 1932 German sports film directed by Erich Schönfelder and starring Manfred von Brauchitsch, Evelyn Holt, and Kurt Vespermann. It is set in the world of motor racing. It was the final film directed by Schönfelder. It was shot at the Babelsberg Studios and on location in Freiburg, at the Nürburgring and the AVUS in Berlin. The film's sets were designed by Artur Günther and Willi A. Herrmann.

== Plot ==
Robert Wenck is a well-known racing driver who goes to Freiburg to take part in a car race that starts there. He is very much looking forward to the race, which will lead through the nearby mountains, because here he will meet his favorite opponent, Kurt Harder. However, this ongoing titular contest between the two rivals hasn't changed their friendship. During training, Wenck and Harder meet and also exchange private words. Wenck learns that his friend Harder recently got married. Robert is happy to accept Kurt's invitation to a seaside resort where newlywed Eva is staying.

During the race, Kurt has a technical glitch that forces him to retire. In a daring ride, Wenck then wins the race. Harder has to go on to Italy and for this reason asks his old friend to drive up to the seaside resort and take care of Harder's wife Eva. Robert is amazed when he sees who Eva Harder is. It is none other than his former flame who he neglected for the sake of his racing. Their unexpected reunion rekindles the feelings they had for each other. Harder is unaware of the former relationship between the two, but an old photograph of Robert and Eva leads him to believe that the two of them probably had something to do with each other. He immediately returns to Germany and goes to see his wife. Great displeasure rises in him when he sees Wenck returning home with Eva from a joint car jaunt.

Kurt Harder now believes that Wenck wants to get the lost love back and declares their friendship over. Only some time later, during a race on the Nürburgring, do the two opponents meet again. A hard-fought battle ensues and Robert manages to take the lead, only to crash his racing car against a rock face. Kurt immediately rushes to him and frees the opponent from the burning wreckage. His human commitment is rewarded, despite the loss of time, Kurt Harder is able to win the race and is on the winner's podium. Before the award ceremony can take place, he and his wife visit Wenck at his bedside. Kurt places one of Eva's hands in Robert's hands, signaling that he is ready to give up his wife, since the two obviously still have a lot in common.

== Cast ==
- Manfred von Brauchitsch as Robert Wenck, Autorennfahrer
- Evelyn Holt as Eva, Wenck's wife
- Kurt Vespermann as Steppke, Wenck's mechanic
- Georg H. Schnell as Kurt Harder, racing driver
- Lucie Höflich as Wenck's mother
- Jessie Vihrog as Charlotte, Eva's friend
- Alfred Abel as Wagemann, headmaster
- Hans Leibelt as Brandt, Mercedes team manager
- Blandine Ebinger as Hilde, Steppke's bride
- Lia Eibenschütz as Juana
- Henry Lorenzen as Krause, the fitter
- Hubert von Meyerinck as Schneckendorf
- Josefine Dora as Anna, Faktotum bei Wencks
- Paul Laven as broadcast rapporteur
- Gerhard Hoffmann as choir
- Ufa Jazz-Orchester as choir
