= The Good King =

The Good King may refer to:

- The Good King (album), a 2013 album by Ghost Ship
- The Good King EP, a 2014 EP by Chris Rivers

== See also ==
- The God King, a 1974 British–Sri Lankan historical film
- "The Good Kind", a song by The Wreckers from the 2006 album Stand Still, Look Pretty
- "The Good Knight and the Bad Knight", an episode of Little Knights
