= A Wild Ride Through the Night =

2001 novel by Walter Moers

- Cover art to the first English-language edition
- Author: Walter Moers
- Original title: Wilde Reise durch die Nacht
- Translator: John Brownjohn
- Illustrator: Gustave Doré
- Language: German
- Genre: Fantasy
- Publication place: Germany
- Pages: 223
- ISBN: 978-3442452910

A Wild Ride Through the Night (German: Wilde Reise durch die Nacht) is a novel by the German author/cartoonist Walter Moers. It was first published in German in 2001 and is the story of Gustave Doré, a young boy who goes on a fantastical adventure to defy Death. The story is based on 12 engravings by Gustave Doré.

This book was actually written by Moers prior to his stories about Zamonia, but was not published in the UK until 2004 and the US until 2008. It was translated into English from German by John Brownjohn.

The story itself is not set in Zamonia, as most of Moers’ other novels are.

Illustrations used are taken from "The Rime of the Ancient Mariner", Orlando Furioso, "The Raven", Don Quixote, Legend of Croquemitane, Gargantua and Pantagruel, Paradise Lost, and the Bible.

Blind Guardian's song, from the album A Twist in the Myth, "This Will Never End", is based on this book.

== Plot summary ==
The story begins with 12-year-old Gustave, captain of the Aventure as he attempts to escape the deadly Siamese Twins Tornado. When the storm finally catches up with his crew, everyone is killed except Gustave, who meets Death, and his crazy sister Dementia. After the wicked siblings play dice for Gustave's soul, Death gives him six seemingly impossible tasks in order to stay alive. In one night, he must face six giants, rescue a damsel in distress from the clutches of a dragon, make himself conspicuous amidst a forest of evil spirits, encounter the Most Monstrous of all Monsters, and even meet himself.
