= Der perfekte Mord =

1960 novel by Frank Arnau

Der perfekte Mord, published in 1960, is a detective fiction novel written by German author Frank Arnau. "Der perfekte Mord" is German for "the perfect murder". The novel is set in Hamburg.

== Plot ==
To celebrate the successful illegal transaction of weapons to Algerian freedom fighters, Nissim Cordanu is going to organise a dinner for ten people at his house. Walter Reyder, head of the Hamburg Police research force, is oblivious when he is almost struck by Nissim's car. Nissim immediately recognises his old friend, even though twenty-five years have passed since they met. Nissim invites his old friend for dinner, not suspecting that by doing so, he invites the law as the eleventh guest. When it is announced that a very special hypnosis act will be performed at the party, Reyder decides that it is not yet time to reveal his true identity.
