= Oliver Stokowski =

German film and stage actor (born 1962)

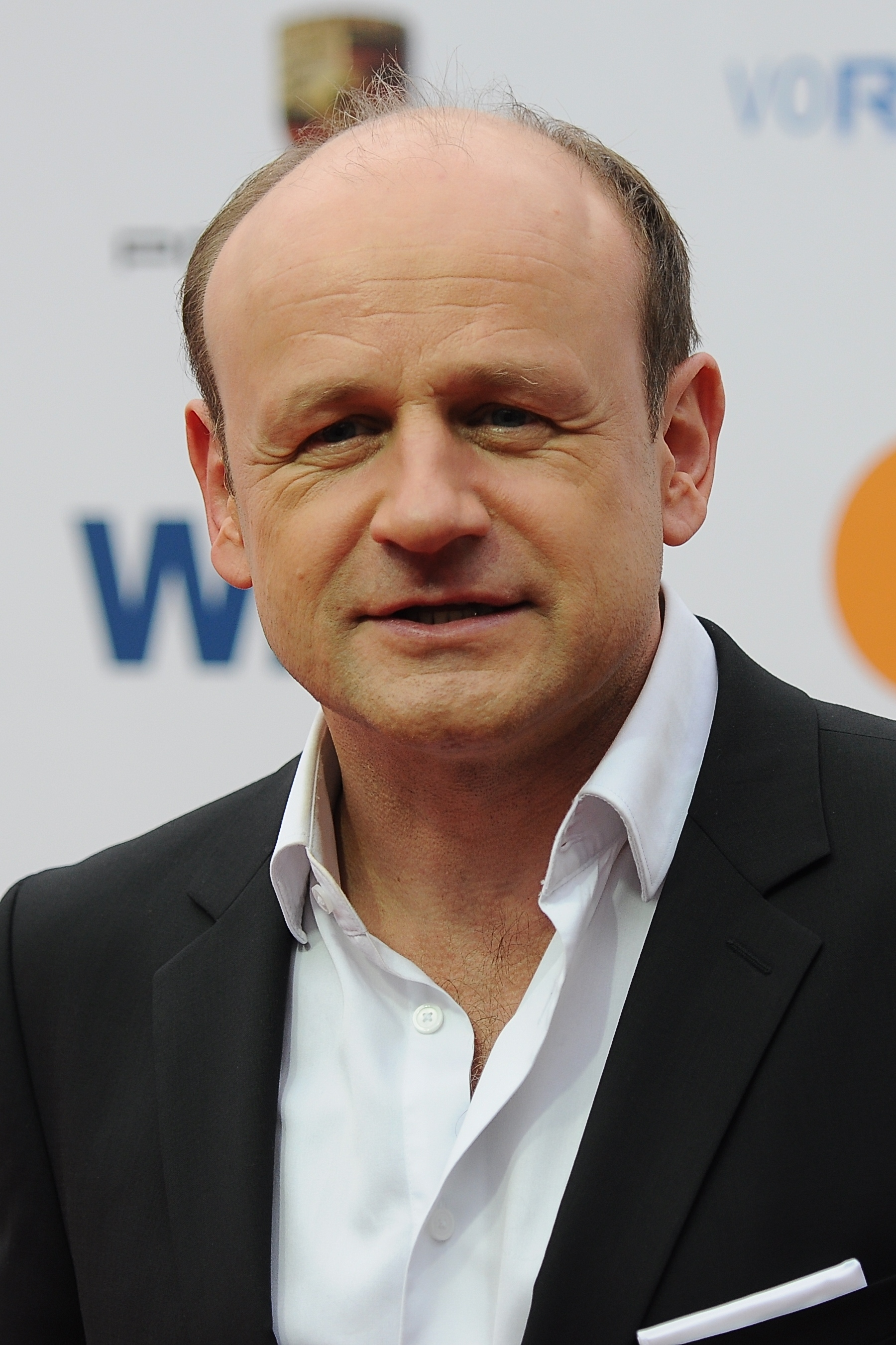
- Oliver Stokowski at the Grimme-Preis 2014
- Born: 8 August 1962 (age 63); Kassel, West Germany
- Occupation: Actor
- Years active: 1987-present

Oliver Stokowski (born 8 August 1962) is a German film and stage actor. He is best known for his per formance as Schütte - Prisoner No. 82 in Das Experiment. In 2014 he won the Grimme-Preis.

== Filmography ==
Film
| Year | Title | Role | Notes |
|---|---|---|---|
| 1989 | Tiger, Lion, Panther | Schorsch | |
| 1989 | Schatten der Wüste | Kai | |
| 1992 | Shadow Boxer | Dealer | |
| 1995 | Japaner sind die besseren Liebhaber | | |
| 1996 | Regular Guys | Mike | |
| 1999 | St. Pauli Night | | |
| 2000 | U-571 | German Chief | |
| 2001 | Das Experiment | Schütte - Prisoner No. 82 | |
| 2004 | Hildes Reise | Stephan Bertsch, Martin's former boyfriend | |
| 2005 | Schneeland | Salomon | |
| 2007 | Wild Chicks in Love | Thorben Mossmann | |
| 2008 | Peaceful Times | Dieter Striesow | |
| 2008 | Max Manus: Man of War | Oberscharfuhrer Karl Hohler | |
| 2010 | The Silence | Matthias Grimmer | |
| 2013 | The Book Thief | Alex Steiner | |
| 2016 | Sex & Crime | Ha-Gü | |
| 2016 | Short Term Memory Loss | Ronald | |
| 2017 | Vollmond | Martin Wildner | |
