= The Alchemaster's Apprentice =

2007 novel by Walter Moers

- Author: Walter Moers
- Original title: Der Schrecksenmeister
- Translator: John Brownjohn
- Language: German
- Genre: Fantasy novel
- Publisher: Piper Verlag
- Publication date: 2007
- Publication place: Germany
- English publication date: 2010
- ISBN: 978-3492049375

The Alchemaster's Apprentice is a fantasy novel by Walter Moers, first published in August 2007. It is the fifth of his novels set on the continent of Zamonia, and as in the earlier Ensel and Krete and The City of Dreaming Books, Moers purports to be acting merely as the translator of a work by the Zamonian writer Optimus Yarnspinner. An English translation by John Brownjohn was published in 2010.

The novel is described on the title page as 'a culinary fairy tale', reflecting the importance within the story of the theme of cooking and eating.

== Synopsis ==
The novel takes place in Malaisea, the "least healthy place in Zamonia". The city is dominated by the Alchemaster of the title, Ghoolion, who lives in a building which towers over the town and who combines a range of activities: alchemy; controlling the city's Ugglies (roughly equivalent to witches); spreading disease among the city's inhabitants; and painting pictures of natural disasters.

The novel's other main character is Echo, a Crat (an animal identical to a cat except that it can speak all languages, has near perfect memory and two livers). On the death of his owner, Echo faces starvation until he makes a deal with the Alchemaster: the latter will fatten the Crat for a month, in return for which he will then be permitted to kill Echo and extract his fat. Ghoolion intends to use the fat for various alchemistic purposes, but in particular as the final ingredient which he needs to secure the secret of eternal life: it turns out that Echo's deceased owner had been the long-lost lover of Ghoolion, who intends to bring her back to life.

Echo attempts to escape from his pact, enlisting the help of a Tuwituwu (a one-eyed species of owl) by the name of Theodore T. Theodore, and the last Uggly in Malaisea, Izanuela, who is in love with Ghoolion. Echo and Izanuela plan to use a love potion to make Ghoolion return the Uggly's love. The plan fails, and Izanuela is killed, but in revenge the living houses of the Uggly destroy Ghoolion's castle. Echo is saved and sets off in search of his own love with a female Crat.

== Intertextuality ==
The Alchemaster's Apprentice is a reworking of the novella Spiegel the Cat by Gottfried Keller. The names in the German original are only lightly transformed: Keller's novel features the alchemist and Hexenmeister (witch master) Pineiß, living in the town of Seldwyla, while Moers' novel features the Schrecksenmeister Eißpin, who lives in Sledwaya. Keller's work also features a contract in which the alchemist is to fatten up the cat in return for its fat, but in the original the cat escapes by tricking him into marrying the town's witch.

The novel features two afterwords: one by the Zamonian writer Optimus Yarnspinner, in which he explains that he is reworking a story named "Echo the Crat" which is originally by 'Gofid Letterkerl' (an anagram of Gottfried Keller), because Letterkerl's style makes his works inaccessible to modern readers. In the second afterword, only found in the German edition, Moers informs the reader of the troubles which he had translating Yarnspinner's work, which dates from his 'hypochondriac' phase; Moers claims to have reduced the length of the book by some 700 pages through the elimination of Yarnspinner's lengthy discussion of his own physical condition.
