= Auntie Poldi and the Sicilian Lions =

2014 book by Mario Giordano

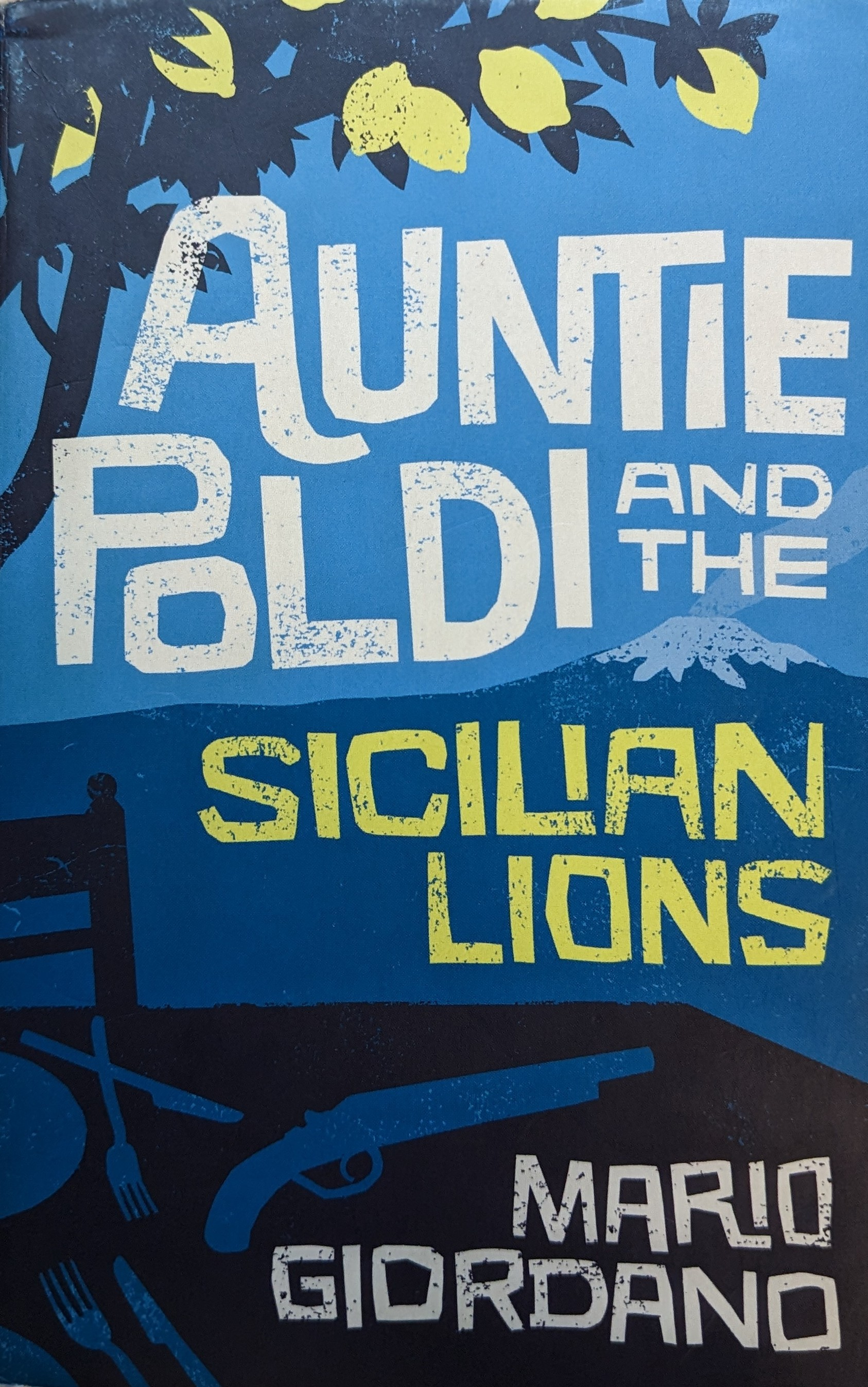
- Author: Mairo Giordano
- Translator: John Brownjohn
- Language: German
- Series: Auntie Poldi Adventures
- Genre: Detective fiction
- Publication date: March 12, 2014
- ISBN: 978-1328863577
- Followed by: Aunti Poldi and the Vineyards of Etna

Auntie Poldi and the Sicilian Lions is the first of five books written by Mario Giordano in the Auntie Poldi Adventure Series. It was published in German in 2014 and translated into English by John Brownjohn in 2018. It was the first of Giordano's novels to be translated into English. Set in Sicily, the topics of the Sicilian Mafia and Italian police forces are presented.

== Summary ==
Isolde Oberreiter, known in the story as Auntie Poldi, is a Bavarian widow who retires to Sicily on her 60th birthday with an intention of drinking the rest of her days away at her seaside house. When Poldi's handyman Valentino Candela fails to show up to her home one day, Poldi becomes concerned, and begins to inquire into his whereabouts. During her search, Poldi speaks to Valentino's parents, who inform her that Valentino used to work for a man named Russo near the estate of Femminamorta.

Poldi travels to Femminamorta to investigate, where she meets Valerie, the house's owner and sole resident. Valerie reveals that Russo, a mafia leader, is pressuring her into selling the land. She believes that he is behind the theft of one of the lion guardants at her house. Unable to speak to Russo at his house, Poldi is subsequently invited to Valerie's uncle Mimi's party because Russo will also be there. Poldi's plan to interrogate Russo is foiled by Mimi's incessant discussion of Friedrich Hölderlin's poetry.

Two days later, Poldi discovers Valentino's body at the beach. She calls the two police entities, causing confusion about jurisdiction. Chief inspector Vito Montana later arrives at the scene as a leader of the police investigating Valentino's murder and questions Poldi. After questioning Poldi and advising her to stay out of the case, Montana lets her go.

Despite Montana's instructions, Poldi continues to involve herself in the case through her own investigation. Throughout her investigations, she continues to get closer to Montana through professional, personal, and sexual interactions.

It is later discovered that Valerie's missing lion guardant was placed inside Poldi's house. Inside it, she found an inventory of prices. Poldi later learned that the inventory was for items looted from houses belonging to Mimi.

Poldi finds out there is more than one Femminamorta in Italy, meaning that Valerie's house may not have been the correct location of the crime. Poldi links the yellow crystal she found in Valentino's room to a sulfur crystal. There is a sulfur mine called Femminamorta, so they go investigate it and find a dead body dumped in an old iron cistern and locked with a brand-new padlock. Montana reveals that Valentino's blood was found in the boot of a vehicle whose tire tracks were found by the mine.

Signora Cocuzza, a worker at the town's gelateria (a shop that sells gelato), goes to Poldi's house and reveals that she knows who the body in the cistern was. Her name was Marisa and she made a man who wrote her love letters jealous by falling for someone else. Marisa died after confronting this man. Signora Cocuzza leads Poldi to the virgin Mary statue where Marisa and the man exchanged love letters. Poldi discovers poetry in the imitation of Hölderlin, which leads her to suspect Mimi not only as Marisa's murderer but also Valentino's.

At Poldi's house, Mimi realizes Poldi identified him as the murderer and sends his dog to attack Poldi. He reveals his motives by saying Valentino was blackmailing him about the letters and would not stop. Montana then arrives and shoots Mimi's dog. Mimi dies of heart failure shortly after.

The story ends with Montana, who had to choose between Poldi and his current girlfriend, later showing up at Poldi's house and being warmly welcomed inside.

== Inspiration ==
In interviews, Giordano spoke about the pieces of his own life that led him to create the character of Auntie Poldi. Giordano had people in his life that were his inspiration for Auntie Poldi, Teresa, Caterina, and Luisa. While he does not mention his aunt by name, Giordano does say that he has a Bavarian aunt who moved to Sicily with similar goals to Auntie Poldi. Giordano also said that the narrator of the novel, an aspiring novelist without a life plan, is inspired by himself at a young age. Giordano was even writing a family saga similar to the one that the narrator attempts to write throughout the novel.

Giordano was born in Munich, Germany. His parents are both of Italian descent. Most of his career was focused on writing, as he wrote novels and screenplays. Much of his work has been awarded. This novel, inspired by his family and life, is his first novel to be translated into English from its original language of German. His time attending primary school in Bavaria influenced his use of Bavarian language in his novel. Giordano said he specifically loves the roughness of the Bavarian dialect, which he feels suits Auntie Poldi as a character.

== Issues in Italian culture ==
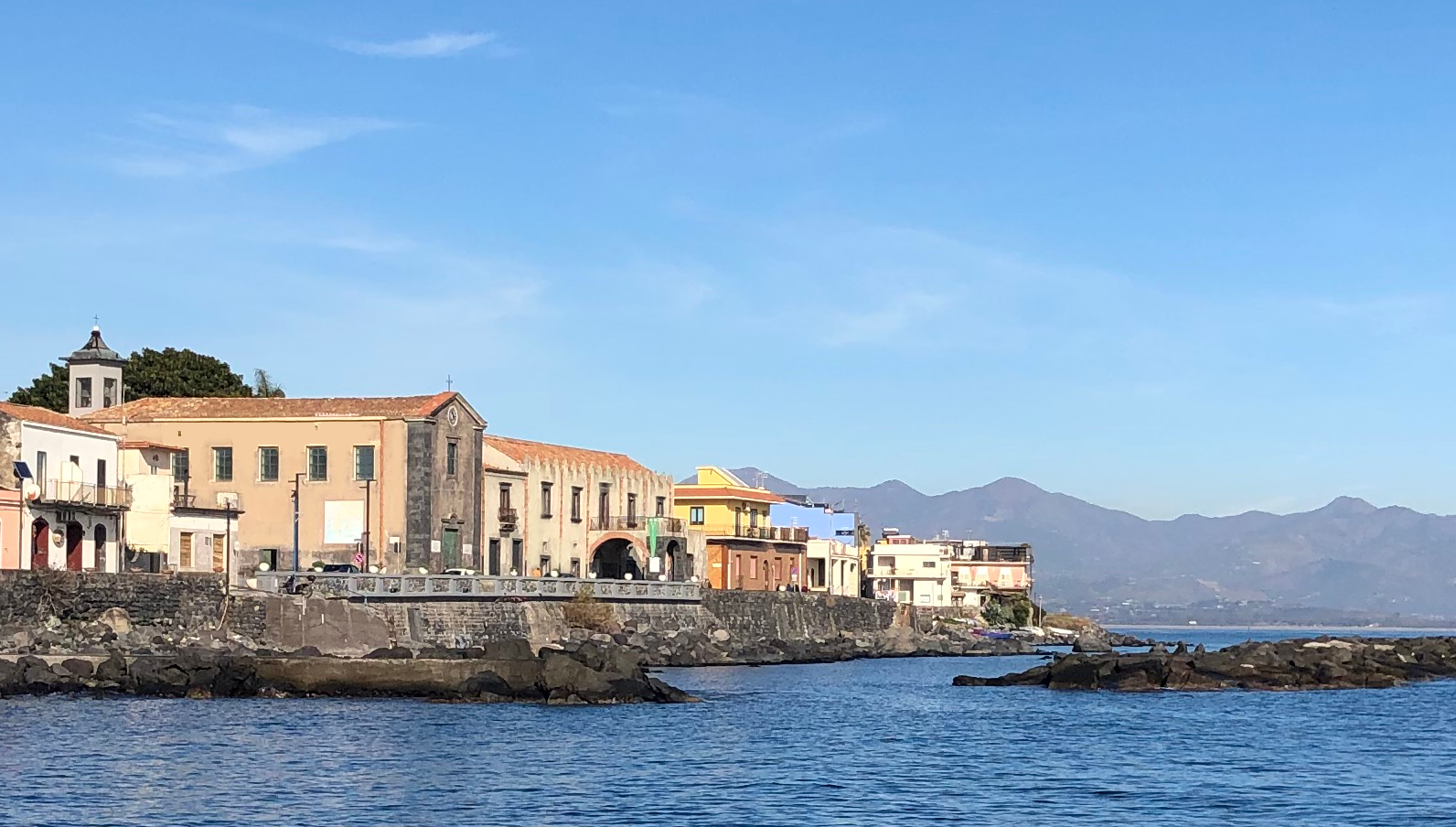
Torre Archirafi, the setting of Auntie Poldi and the Sicilian Lions

This story is set in the town of Torre Archirafi in Sicily. It is a small, ocean-front town that also has sulfur mines. The Italian setting of the book allowed Giordano to include many aspects of Italian culture in his book. Italian culture is described as an ideal setting because of the social issues of government corruption and the presence of the mafia which are prominent in Italian society.

=== Mafia ===
The Sicilian Mafia is a major part of Sicilian culture. The mafia was prevalent throughout Sicilian society and left an impact on its residents. For example, Italian crime writer Leonardo Sciascia's writings were inspired by his upbringing in mafia-ridden Sicily. The Mafia has been a major part of Sicilian culture since the 19th century. It originally started as a way to identify those who were suspicious of the government. Currently, the Mafia's strength in culture has been weakened. Its primary activity includes protecting those who pay for protection, which often includes criminals.

In Auntie Poldi and the Sicilian Lions, a member of the mafia is the first major suspect of Valentino's murder.

=== Police jurisdiction ===
When Poldi finds Valentino's body, she accidentally calls the Carabinieri instead of the Polizia di Stato (state police). She ends up calling both after noticing her mistake, causing a confusion on police jurisdiction that resulted in Vito Montana, a chief inspector associated with the state police, heading both police departments on the case.

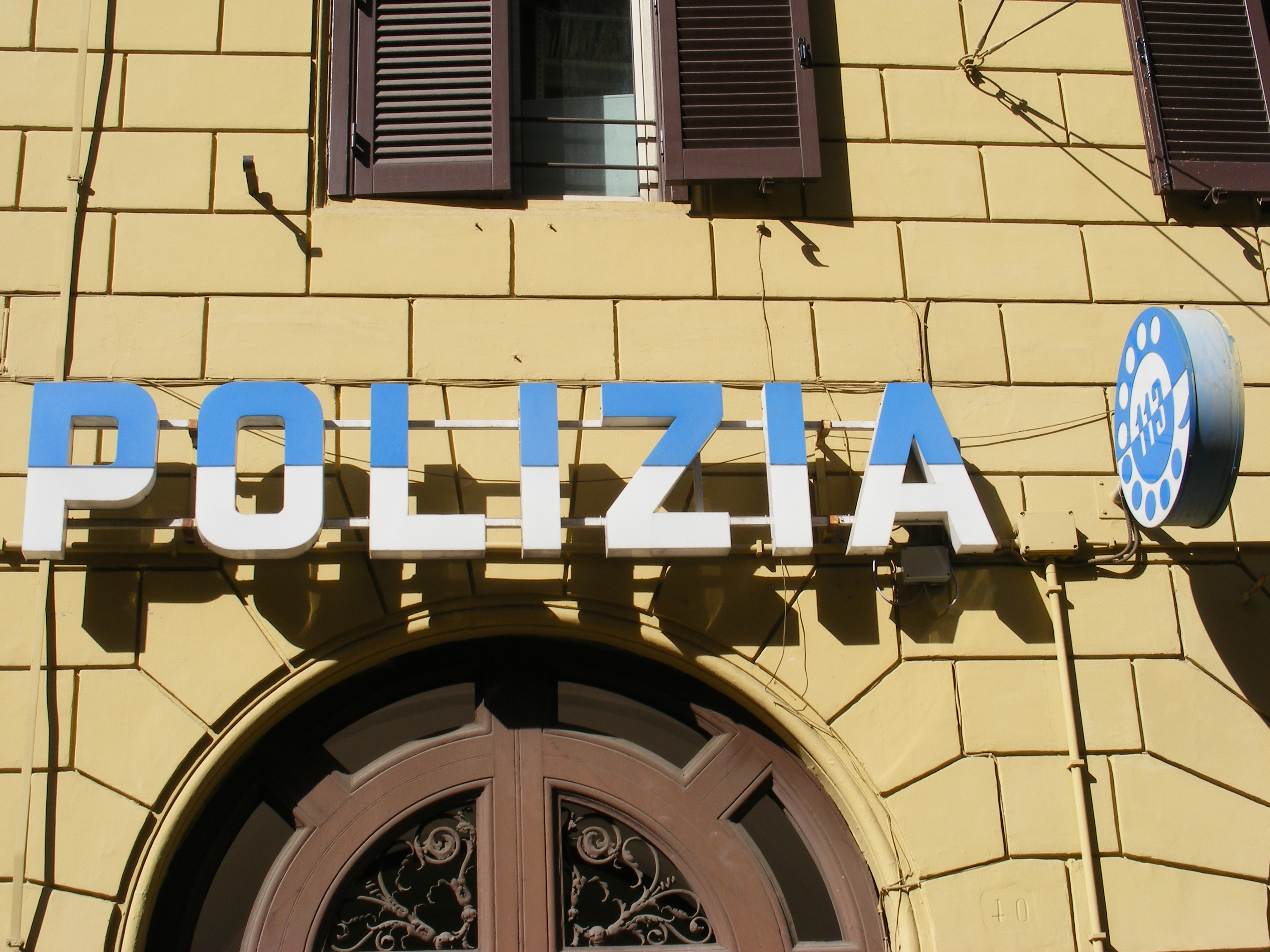
A Polizia di Stato station in Rome.

Both the Carabinieri and the Polizia di Stato are headquartered in Rome, but have stations all throughout Italy. The Carabinieri, associated with the Ministry of Defense, primarily handles financial crimes. In contrast, the Polizia di Stato handles investigation and arrests of criminals associated with human crimes such as murder. Located in each city, members of the Polizia di Stato also act as rangers, traffic police, and coast guards. Valentino's murder, according to police jurisdiction, officially belongs to the Polizia di Sato.

== Reception ==
The book garnered a generally positive reception. For example, the Lisle Library District located in Illinois hosted a book club which reviewed Auntie Poldi and the Sicilian Lions. In their discussion, they determined that the book is "a great armchair travel experience" and "eccentric and appealing".

There are also plans for a British production company to create a TV series following the events of the Aunt Poldi series.
