= Mario Giordano (writer) =

German writer (born 1963)

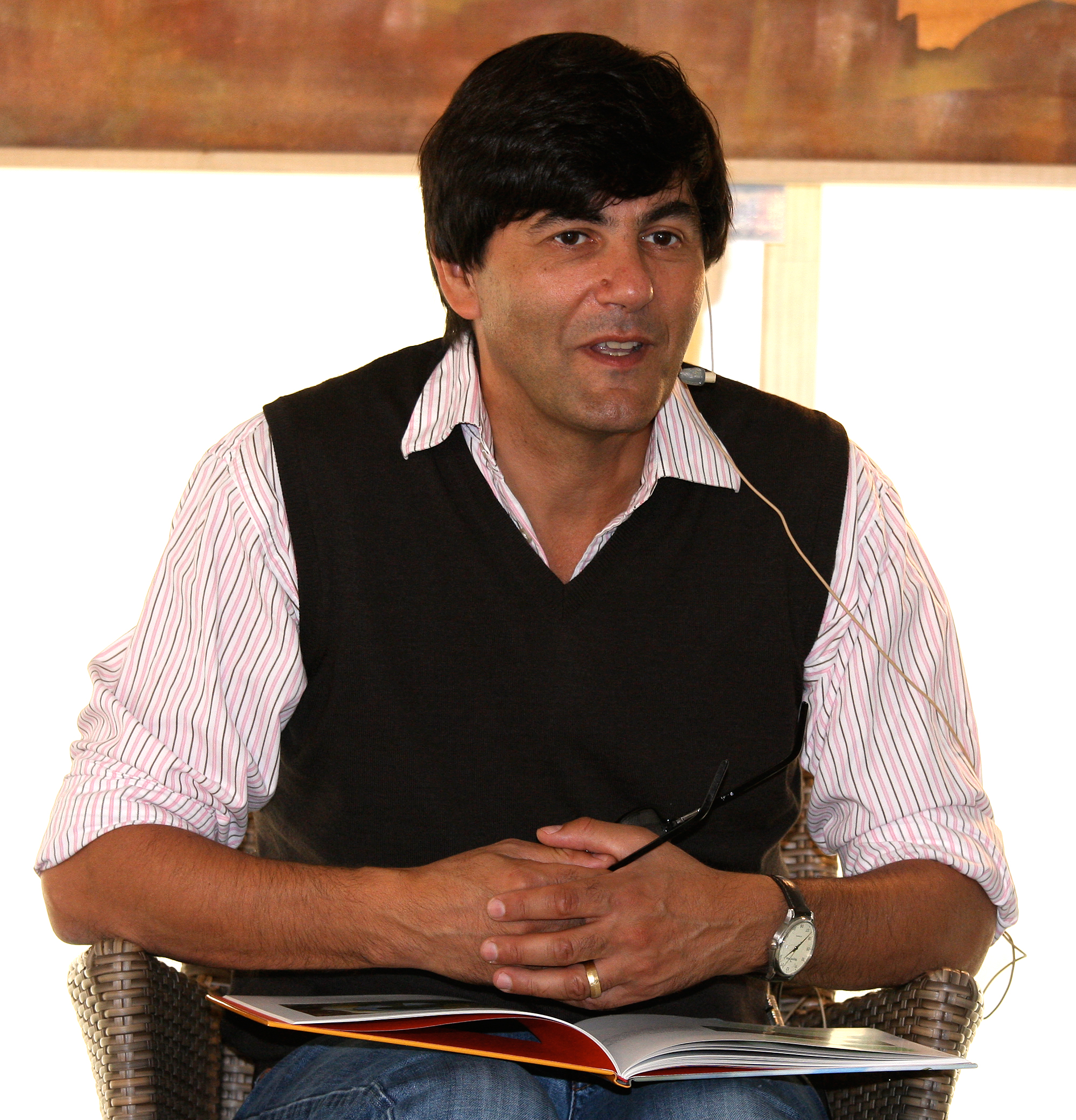
- Giordano in 2009
- Born: 30 May 1963 (age 62); Munich, West Germany
- Occupation: Writer

Mario Giordano (born 30 May 1963) is a German writer. His novel Black Box (1999), which is based on a true occurrence (Stanford prison experiment) was adapted to a film under the name Das Experiment directed by Oliver Hirschbiegel. The film was acclaimed and Giordano received for it among other prizes the Bavarian Film Award for Best Screenplay.

== Books ==
- Karakum
- Der aus den Docks
- Black Box (Das Experiment) also as screenplay
- Pangea (together with Andreas Schlüter)
- 1000 Gefühle für die es keinen Namen gibt
- Auntie Poldi and the Sicilian Lions
- Auntie Poldi and the Fruits of the Lord alternately titled Auntie Poldi and the Vineyards of Etna
- Auntie Poldi and the Handsome Antonio
- Auntie Poldi and the Lost Madonna
- 1,000 Feelings for Which There Are No Names - Ray Fenwick (Illustrator), Isabel Fargo Cole (Translator)

== Screenplays ==
- Das Experiment, from his novel Black Box, 2001
- Lilalu im Schepperland, from Enid Blyton, 2000
