= Käpt'n Blaubär Club =

- Country of origin: Germany

Production
- Running time: 60 minutes; shortened to 30 minutes

Original release
- Network: Das Erste
- Release: 2 October 1993 – 14 April 2001

Käpt'n Blaubär Club was a German television series for children. It was first aired on the channel Das Erste from 1993 to 2001. The programme was centred around Käpt'n Blaubär (Wolfgang Völz) and Hein Blöd (Edgar Hoppe) and also featured three bears called Yellow, Green and Red. Another important character was a carnivorous flower called Karin (Edith Hancke).

== See also ==
- Blaubär und Blöd (2002 – 2008)
