= Ghost Ship (band) =

American contemporary worship music band

- Origin: Seattle, Washington, U.S.
- Genres: Christian rock, contemporary worship music, folk rock
- Years active: 2009–present
- Labels: BEC, Mars Hill Music
- Members: Cam Huxford, Shay Carlucci, Chae Choi, Tyler Edwards, Doug Finefrock, Mikaela Edwards
- Website: facebook.com/ghostshipmusic

Ghost Ship is a contemporary worship music band from Seattle, Washington, United States. In 2013, the band released the critically acclaimed and commercially successful album entitled The Good King.

== Background ==
In 2009, Ghost Ship formed at Mars Hill Church's Downtown Seattle campus in Seattle, Washington. They were one of the worship bands at the church, alongside Ivan & Alyosha, Elysium, and Thunderoso.

== Music ==
In 2013, the band was signed to BEC Recordings, when the partnership with Mars Hill Music took place.

=== A River with No End EP ===
On November 15, 2011, the EP with Mars Hill Music was released, which was the first EP by the band, but it never charted.

=== The Good King ===
On June 11, 2013, Ghost Ship released The Good King on BEC Recordings in association with Mars Hill Music. The Good King charted at No. 28 and No. 22 on the Top Christian Albums and the Top Heatseekers Albums charts respectively, for the Billboard charting week of June 29, 2013. The album garnered critical acclaim by music critics, which gave only one mixed review.

=== Costly ===
Their second studio album, Costly, was released on August 28, 2015, by BEC Recordings.

=== To the End ===
Their third studio album, To the End, was released on August 9, 2019, by BEC Recordings. The songs were written over a four year period of brokenness and healing, with each song accessing a different snapshot of God speaking into despair and providing hope.

== Members ==
Current

- Cam Huxford – vocals, guitars
- Shay Carlucci – piano, organ, vocals
- Chae Choi – guitars
- Tyler Edwards – bass
- Doug Finefrock – drums
- Mikaela Edwards – violin, vocals

Past

- Jamison Dewlen – banjo, dobro, pedal steel, guitars, percussion
- Fancy Morales – percussion, vocals
- Keegan Williams – bass
- Nate Robertson - bass
- Matt Willis - bass
- Adam Bradley - keys
- Kelsey Schwichtenberg - bass
- Nathan Broyles - drums
- Gabe Martinez - drums
- Chris Bowden - guitar
- Steve Fox - percussion
- Nick Kramer - guitar
- Andrew Jacobson - piano

== Discography ==
=== Studio albums ===
List of studio albums, with selected chart positions
Title	Album details	Peak chart positions	
Title	Album details	US Christ	US Heat
The Good King	Released: June 11, 2013; Label: BEC/Mars Hill; CD, digital download	28	22
