= Death Ship =

Death Ship may refer to:

- "Death Ship" (The Twilight Zone), TV series episode
- The Death Ship, a 1926 novel by B. Traven
- The Death Ship (1928 film), a short film written by Joseph Jackson
- The Death Ship (1959 film), an adaptation of the Traven novel
- Death Ship (1980 film), a film starring George Kennedy

== See also ==
- Ghost Ship (disambiguation)
