= The Good King (album) =

Studio album by Ghost Ship
- Released: June 11, 2013
- Genres: Christian rock, contemporary worship music, folk rock
- Length: 44:25
- Label: BEC/Mars Hill

Ghost Ship chronology
A River with No End EP (2011)	The Good King (2013)	Costly (2015)

The Good King is the debut studio album by contemporary worship music band Ghost Ship, and it was released on June 11, 2013, by the joint label partnership of BEC Recordings and Mars Hill Music venture. This album was commercially successful and critically acclaimed.

== Background ==
The album was released on June 11, 2013, by the joint label partnership of BEC Recordings and Mars Hill Music.

== Music and lyrics ==
Andy Argyrakis at CCM Magazine noted that the band is "presenting Scripture-inspired lyrics with a folk/rock framework." At HM, Sarah Andreas Roberts wrote that the release is "Folky in some songs, country in others [...] and others are more pop-rock", so that "If you enjoy unique pop-rock worship, flecked with elements of folk and piano, you will enjoy this album." Ryan Barbee of Jesus Freak Hideout wrote that the album contains "Convicting truth combined with artful music and a hoedown to wrap it all up; that sounds like a party everyone should be a part of." Also, Jesus Freak Hideout's Mark Rice said that "Lyrically, it is hard to ask for much more out of a worship band".

Jonathan Francesco of New Release Tuesday wrote that "While the song selection is definitely in line with an extended Sunday Morning worship set list, the sound is definitely not your typical Church music. Thematically, the album has an especially deep layer that goes beyond any individual songs that is best seen when the songs stand together as a cohesive collection." At Indie Vision Music, Josh Hamm told that "with an alternative rock sound with folk sensibilities seeping through every once and awhile", and that the album "is undeniably one of the most in your face declarations of the Gospel in modern worship."

Lydia Akinola at The Christian Manifesto stated that the release is "Musically engaging, theologically whole and endlessly interesting", which is because it "exhibits an incredible quirkiness that quickly draws you in." At Louder Than the Music, Lydia Akinola said that the release "sounds like a fresh new sound, because there is something more than that with the sound of this album." Mathew Reamus of All About Worship wrote that "Overall the album is a little less congregational than other worship albums, but is filled with rich theology."

== Critical reception ==
Professional ratings
Review scores
Source	Rating
All About Worship	4/5 stars
CCM Magazine	4/5 stars
The Christian Manifesto	5/5 stars
HM	3.5/5 stars
Indie Vision Music	3/5 stars
Jesus Freak Hideout	4/5 stars
Jesus Freak Hideout	4/5 stars
Louder Than the Music	5/5 stars
New Release Tuesday	4/5 stars

The Good King garnered critical acclaim from music critics. At CCM Magazine, Andy Argyrakis noted that "Though the material is clearly grounded in Gospel, it never sounds like convention church praise, making those rootsy romps a great evangelism tool for faith seekers that also gives believers with more indie-minded musical tastes something meaty to sink their teeth into." Sarah Andreas Roberts at HM told that "While the album may be a bit too varied stylistically, it is well-written and doesn't fall into your 'typical' worship album category."

At Jesus Freak Hideout, Ryan Barbee said that "Some listeners may be put off by the folk/story format, while others may gravitate toward this style", however "it is easy to surmise that The Good King is surely good." In addition, Jesus Freak Hideout's Mark Rice stated "The Good King is a definitely good album to start off with", and that "The Good King does everything that a band ought to do, and does it with impeccable quality." At New Release Tuesday, Jonathan Francesco closed with stating that the band "successfully infuse fairly traditional worship music with a fun and upbeat sound that makes for an overall fresher and more dynamic listening and worshiping experience than you might be used to."

Josh Hamm of Indie Vision Music told that overall the band "is on solid footing with The Good King. It is heartfelt worship that has a focus in theology through a scripture based storytelling that is a delight to listen to. Although some of the songs aren’t as strong as they could be, there are moments of grandeur and joy riddled throughout." At The Christian Manifesto, Lydia Akinola proclaimed that "The Good King is a stellar album. I cannot emphasize it enough." Jono Davies of Louder Than the Music felt that "this album uses passionate words that declare who God is, and it has its fair share of inspiring words to uplift the listener." At All About Worship, Mathew Reamus affirmed that "The Good King is a very unique album."

Sam Robinson of Reel Gospel awarded The Good King the inaugural Reel Gospel Album of the Year in 2013, stating the record contains 'eleven beautifully-crafted tracks that focus on Jesus, the King.'

== Commercial performance ==
For the Billboard charting week of June 29, 2013, The Good King was the No. 22 most sold album in the breaking and entry chart of the United States by the Top Heatseekers and it was the No. 28 Top Christian Album as well.

== Track listing ==
No.	Title	Length
1.	"Mediator"	3:17
2.	"Orion"	5:11
3.	"Lion Man"	4:03
4.	"Jude Doxology"	3:47
5.	"Son of David"	4:15
6.	"The Truth"	3:47
7.	"Holy Holy Holy"	4:00
8.	"The Gospel"	3:27
9.	"Behold the Lamb of God"	4:18
10.	"Where Were You"	4:00
11.	"What a Friend We Have in Jesus"	4:20
Total length:		44:25

== Charts ==
Chart (2013)	Peak position
US Christian Albums (Billboard)	28
US Top Heatseekers Albums (Billboard)	22
