= Ghost Ship (novel) =

2005 young adult novel by Dietlof Reiche

- First American edition cover
- Author: Dietlof Reiche
- Translator: John Brownjohn
- Language: German
- Genre: Paranormal fiction
- Publisher: Scholastic (English-language)
- Publication date: March 1, 2005 (English-language)
- Pages: 320 (paperback)
- ISBN: 978-0-439-59705-0

Ghost Ship is a 2005 young adult paranormal novel by Dietlof Reiche.

== Synopsis ==
Vicki, a 12-year-old girl helping run her father's New England restaurant, learns that her family history traces back to a doomed ghost ship in the 1700s and becomes entangled in the mystery of the present-day ship haunting the coast.

== Publishing history ==
Ghost Ship was released in the United States by Scholastic on March 1, 2005. The English-language release was translated by John Brownjohn. It was released in the United Kingdom by Chicken House in 2007.

== Reception ==
The English-language edition received mixed-to-positive feedback upon release.Kirkus Reviews complimented the novel's ideas and characters but criticized the internal logic, describing it as "sometimes shaky." Publishers Weekly wrote that the book was a "dramatic departure" from Reiche's previous, more humorous, novels, but recommended the book. The Park City Daily News published a positive review, praising the book for appealing to children of a wide range of ages and for the plot.

School Library Journal described the book as being somewhat derivative of Pirates of the Caribbean but recommended it for its engaging plot, while The Bulletin of the Center for Children's Books complimented the Reiche for consistently raising the stakes of the plot but criticized him for rooting the ship's curse in the killing of white sailors rather than their participation in the Atlantic slave trade. In a more critical review, Booklist described the translation as having "pedestrian dialogue and lots of clichés."

After the UK release, the Birmingham Post published a mostly positive review that criticized the characterization of the side characters but praised the novel's plot.
