= Phantom Ship =

Phantom Ship may refer to:

- Ghost ship, a vessel with no living crew aboard
- Phantom Ship (island), in Crater Lake, Oregon, U.S.
- The Phantom Ship, an 1839 novel by Frederick Marryat
- The Phantom Ship (film), a 1936 animated short film
- Phantom Ship, a shortened version in the U.S. of the 1935 British film The Mystery of the Mary Celeste

== See also ==
- Ghost Ship (disambiguation)
