= The 13½ Lives of Captain Bluebear =

1999 novel by Walter Moers

The 13 1/2 Lives of Captain Bluebear
- Author: Walter Moers
- Original title: Die 13½ Leben des Käpt’n Blaubär
- Translator: John Brownjohn
- Illustrator: Walter Moers
- Cover artist: Walter Moers
- Language: German
- Series: Zamonia
- Genre: Fantasy novel
- Publisher: Eichborn Verlag
- Publication date: 1999
- Publication place: Germany
- English publication date: 2000
- Media type: Print (hardcover)
- ISBN: 3-8218-2969-9 (first hardcover edition)
- Followed by: Ensel und Krete (2000)

The 13 1/2 Lives of Captain Bluebear is a 1999 fantasy novel by German writer and cartoonist Walter Moers which details the numerous lives of a human-sized bear with blue fur. Though the novel was originally written in German, an English translation by John Brownjohn was published in the United Kingdom in 2000 and in the United States in 2005, an Italian translation in 2000, a Chinese translation in 2002, and a French translation in 2005. The book became a bestseller in Europe with considerable popularity in Germany and the United Kingdom while experiencing relative obscurity in the United States.

== Plot ==
The 13 1/2 Lives of Captain Bluebear follows the adventures of the character Bluebear in the first half of his 27 lives. The novel intersperses Bluebear's narrative with excerpts from The Encyclopedia of Marvels, Life Forms and Other Phenomena of Zamonia and its Environs by Professor Abdullah Nightingale, who bacterially transmits it into Bluebear's brain.

The story is set in the fictional continent of Zamonia (location of several other novels by Walter Moers) on Earth before the "great descent" in which Zamonia and many other continents sink beneath the waves. Many of the creatures encountered by Bluebear in the novel are taken from myths, folktales, prehistory, and Moers' imagination, among them Gryphons, Maenads, Trolls, Yetis, and Pterodactyls. Nearing the end of the novel, the mythical city of Atlantis disappears from Earth, an event witnessed by Bluebear.

The plot is supplemented by Moers' drawings of the characters interspersed throughout the book. These illustrations are done in a cartoonish style: Moers is a noted German cartoonist. While the drawings are colored in the German hardcover version, they remain in black-and-white in most other versions.

=== Summary ===
==== Life 1 ====
Bluebear begins life floating in a walnut shell in the north Zamonian sea and in the grip of the Malmstrom, a mysterious and giant whirlpool that all the world's sailors take care to avoid. He is saved by a fearless crew of Minipirates, diminutive buccaneers who adopt the bear as their good-luck charm. He grows up on a diet of exclusively seaweed and water, and begins to apprentice the Minipirates' nautical way of life. Aboard their tiny craft he learns much of waves, sailing, and knot tying, but after five years aboard he grows too large for the ship and the Minipirates regretfully maroon him on an island.

==== Life 2 ====
On the island, Bluebear discovers a group of Hobgoblins, who raise him to celebrity status for his fantastic displays of crying. Hobgoblins are, according to Nightingale's encyclopedia, semi-ghost invertebrates who feed on emotions. Every night Bluebear cries for their pleasure, and they elevate him to stardom. Eventually repulsed by his lifestyle, Bluebear builds a raft and sets off on his own.

==== Life 3 ====
Lost at sea, Bluebear is befriended by a pair of "Babbling Billows", or talking waves, who teach him to speak, and encounters the SS Moloch, the world's largest ship. He makes futile attempts to board the vessel, and in his head hears a voice that whispers repeatedly: "Come! Come aboard the Moloch!". Soon afterwards Bluebear is almost eaten by a Tyrannomobyus Rex, a gargantuan black whale with one eye. Bluebear helps ease the creature's pain by pulling harpoons out of its back (originally intending to construct another raft out of them but, becoming too absorbed in the task, tossing them into the water) and the grateful whale deposits him within swimming distance of another island.

==== Life 4 ====
The island, which Bluebear christens "Gourmet Island", proves to be a fantastic paradise filled with delicious foodstuffs that mysteriously grow in place of normal vegetation. (Ex: The lakes are filled with chocolate and all the so called "Animals" Always get along.) The bear, after sampling them all, develops a monstrous appetite and lavish tastes. He eats so much that he can no longer walk comfortably. Bluebear's last meal (a man-sized mushroom) is interrupted by the discovery that the island is a giant carnivorous plant that ensnares passers-by, fattens them up and eats them at 300 pounds. Seconds from being devoured, Bluebear is saved by Deus X. "Mac" Machina, a pterodactyl Roving Reptilian Rescuer whose job is to save adventurers moments before their death. There is only few left in his world, and he just so happened to encounter one.

==== Life 5 ====
Bluebear acts as a navigator for the near-sighted Mac, assisting the Reptilian Rescuer in his daring rescues, including saving a farm of Wolperting Whelps from the dreaded Bollogg: a cyclops varying from 50 feet to two miles high that can survive without a head. On flying over the city of Atlantis (Zamonia's capital), Bluebear promises himself that he will visit it someday. Towards the end of his time with Mac, he rescues a human who threw himself off the Demon Range, a man who later appears in Life 10. The year ends with Mac entering retirement and depositing Bluebear at the entrance to the Nocturnal Academy, the headmaster of which (Professor Abdullah Nightingale) owes Mac a favor.

==== Life 6 ====
At Nightingale's Academy, Bluebear is taught all the knowledge in the universe by the seven-brained Nocturnomath Professor Abdullah Nightingale and his infectious intelligence bacteria. The closer one is to a Nocturnomath, and the more bacteria they absorb, the more intelligent one becomes. Fellow students include Qwerty Uiop (a gelatine prince from the 2364th Dimension who accidentally fell into this world through a Dimensional Hiatus) and Fredda the Alpine Imp (a hairy creature with a crush on Bluebear). Before leaving the Academy, Bluebear is infected with intelligence bacteria, and Nightingale transmits an encyclopedia into his head. In the caves outside the Academy, he meets Qwerty next to a Dimensional Hiatus debating whether to jump in and attempt to return home. Bluebear, acting on an impulse, pushes him in the hope that he will land in the right dimension. Bluebear is led astray in the cavern labyrinth by a treacherous Troglotroll (the most reviled and sneaky creature in Zamonia). With the help of a Mountain Maggot (an annelid made of gleaming steel) Bluebear makes his way out of the caves and into the neighboring Great Forest.

==== Life 7 ====
Wandering in the Great Forest, Bluebear spots a blue she-bear in the strangely silent Great Forest and falls in love with her. Bluebear attempts to court her only to discover she is an illusion created by the Spiderwitch, a giant spider, to catch prey. Bluebear is caught in an intricate web in place of where he thought the she-bear's house was. He eventually frees himself and flees from the spider moments before it can dissolve and eat him. He runs for eight hours straight to escape the spider, who is in hot pursuit. Because of the oxygen conditions in the Great Forest, he hallucinates that he is the fastest and most agile creature on the planet. When the hallucination ends, his body feels too heavy to run. Just as his strength gives out, Bluebear stumbles and falls through a fortuitous Dimensional Hiatus, the same sort of portal through which Qwerty entered Bluebear's universe.

==== Life 8 ====
The Dimensional Hiatus deposits Bluebear into the past in the 2364th Dimension, where he sets off a chain of events that led to Qwerty falling into the Dimensional Hiatus and into our world in the first place. Bluebear jumps into the portal after his friend and comes back out in his own world, where the Spiderwitch is nowhere to be seen.

==== Life 9 ====
Seeking Atlantis, Bluebear treks across the Demara Desert in the company of nomadic Muggs who are searching for the legendary mirage city of Anagrom Ataf. Bluebear helps the Muggs trap the city with molten sugar, but they find it already populated with transparent ghost-like Fatoms. He sets the Muggs roaming again, this time in search of a non-existent city called esidaraP s'looF. Leaving their company, Bluebear misinterprets a Tornado Warning for a Tornado Stop and decides to wait there to catch a ride to Atlantis on the other side of the desert. A tornado arrives, but Bluebear is sucked into its center and is aged nearly eighty years upon entering.

==== Life 10 ====
Bluebear and the other elderly denizens of Tornado City search for a way to escape the whirlwind. He is reunited with the cliff-jumper he and Mac once saved, and discovers Phonzotar Huxo, a madman in the tornado who is responsible for the strange laws of the Muggs and their search for Anagrom Ataf. Bluebear is told by the encyclopedia that the tornado stops for one minute once a year, so he and the other old men count backwards for a year in anticipation of the next stop. During that stop, they dig through the tornado wall, aging in reverse as they make their escape.

==== Life 11 ====
Making his way to Atlantis, Bluebear travels through the discarded head of a Megabollog cyclops. He meets a bad idea named 1600H who saves him from falling into a pool of earwax and drowning. 1600H suggests Bluebear becomes a dream composer. The head, being constantly asleep, must always be dreaming, otherwise it will wake up and throw the brain into confusion as there is no body for it to be attached to. Bluebear takes a job as a dream composer, manipulating the head's "dream organ" in order to purchase a map of the head's interior so that he may find his way out. Insanity (another idea, whose plans were thwarted previously by Bluebear) steals the map and attacks Bluebear, but right before Bluebear is pushed into the Lake of Oblivion, a pool of liquid forgetfulness that totally annihilates anything thrown in, 1600H pushes Insanity into the lake himself. Bluebear escapes the head just as the roaming cyclops body returns to put his head back on his shoulders, and approaches the city of Atlantis.

==== Life 12 ====
Entering the city, Bluebear meets a Brazilian tobacco dwarf named Chemluth Havanna who becomes his new best friend. Bluebear works his way up the Atlantean professions tree, starting as a sweeper in a spitting tavern and eventually reaching the coveted King of Lies in the Megathon's Congladiator tournaments. The King of Lies and their challenger exchange fictitious stories, with the audience deciding who wins each round. Bluebear defends his throne for over a year, eventually battling against the Congladiating legend and former champion Nussram Fakhir in an epic 99-round Duel of Lies. Bluebear's boss, Volzotan Smyke, asks him to throw this last fight and when the bear wins it, Smyke attempts to sell him onto the giant SS Moloch; which is revealed to be a slave ship. However, Bluebear's guard, one of the Wolperting Whelps saved by Bluebear and Mac, takes the bear below Atlantis, where Bluebear is reunited with Fredda the Alpine Imp and the Troglotroll. Fredda and the Invisibles (creatures from another planet who really are invisible) plan to pilot the city of Atlantis off Earth and to their planet before the continent of Zamonia sinks beneath the waves. Chemluth, inveterate womanizer, becomes smitten with Fredda and decides to stay with her and the Invisibles, but Bluebear elects to remain behind with the Troglotroll as he has no desire to leave Earth. As Atlantis flies away, the Troglotroll betrays Bluebear yet again and deposits him into the hands of the Moloch's slave crew.

==== Life 13 ====
Bluebear discovers that the captain of the Moloch is the renegade Zamonium, the only thinking element. Professor Nightingale reappears piloting a cloud of darkness and reveals reluctantly that he created the Zamonium himself. He does battle with the Zamonium in a war of thoughts. In the midst of the fight, Bluebear manages to throw the Zamonium into Nightingale's cloud of domesticated darkness and frees the crew. The Moloch, without a pilot at the wheel, becomes trapped by the massive Malmstrom, but the crew, minus Bluebear, is saved by the fortuitous arrival of an army of Reptilian Rescuers. As Mac, who now has a large pair of glasses, tries to save Bluebear, the Troglotroll jumps onto his back instead and Mac flies off. The unfortunate bear is the only person left on the ship. Bluebear almost falls into the Malmstrom, which turns out to be a Dimensional Hiatus, and he is saved by the arrival of his old friend Qwerty Uiop on a flying carpet, who is soaring up from the whirlpool. Upon rejoining the rescued crew, Bluebear discovers that many of them are Chromobears, members of his own species. Every Chromobear has different coloured fur, but the soot on the Moloch made their fur appear to be black until it was washed off in a flooded lagoon in the spot where Atlantis used to be. Bluebear learns that the Chromobears once lived in the Great Forest, but they were forced to leave for the coasts when the Spiderwitch invaded the forest, and were later found by the Zamonium, which enslaved them on the Moloch. He later finds that a bluebear couple (an ultramarine male and an indigo female) who were slaves on the Moloch who threw their newborn off the ship to avoid a life of slavery, are likely his parents. The Chromobears then decide to reinhabit the Great Forest.

==== Life 13 1/2 ====
At the end of the book, in Bluebear's final "half-life", he meets a real-life she-bear identical to the one he hallucinated in Life 7. He begins a new life with her, but hints that further adventures await them in the future.

The book written later "The Adventures of Rumo" expands upon Zamonia by telling the story from the perspective of a young Wolpertinger.

== Influences ==
The novel has similarities with The Hitchhiker's Guide to the Galaxy (1979) in the frequent occurrence of excerpts from Professor Abdullah Nightingale's The Encyclopedia of Marvels, Life Forms and Other Phenomena of Zamonia and its Environs within the narrative. There are also similarities in the ironic sense of humor found in both works. It also has similarities to both Baron Munchausen and The Phantom Tollbooth (1961) in its description of fantastical adventures and travels. It also shows influence from Moomin series by Tove Jansson.

Bluebear's 27 lives are a joke deriving humor from the implication that a bluebear lives three times as long as a cat.

== Characters ==
In order of appearance.

- Bluebear
- The Minipirates
- The Hobgoblins
- The Babbling Billows
- Deus X. Machina (Mac)
- Professor Abdullah Nightingale
- Qwerty Uiop, the Gelatine Prince from the 2364th Dimension
- Fredda, the Alpine Imp
- Flowergrazer
- Knio, the Barbaric Hog
- Weeny, the Gnomelet
- Odod
- The Troglotroll
- The bear illusion
- The Spiderwitch
- The Muggs
- Baldwyn Baobab
- 1600H, a bad idea
- Chemluth Havanna, the Tobacco Elf
- Volzotan Smyke, the Shark Grub
- Rumo, the Wolperting
- THE Zamonium!
- Avriel

== Adaptations ==
Moers' Captain Bluebear character originally appeared in short segments of the Sendung mit der Maus (Programme with the Mouse), a half-hour German children's television show. During these sequences, a puppet Bluebear would spin ridiculous pirate yarns, all of which he claimed were true. Käpt'n Blaubär – Der Film (Captain Bluebear – The Movie), a traditionally animated movie based on the television series, was released in German theaters in 1999, coinciding with the novel's original release.

A musical version of the novel premiered in October 2006 in Cologne, adapted by Heiko Wohlgemuth and music composed by Martin Lingnau.

== Release details ==
- Die 13½ Leben des Käpt'n Blaubär, Eichborn Verlag, Frankfurt a.M. 1999. ISBN 3-8218-2969-9 (Hardcover)
- The 13½ Lives of Captain Bluebear, Secker & Warburg, UK, 5 October 2000. ISBN 0-436-27500-7 (Hardcover)
- Die 13½ Leben des Käpt'n Blaubär, Goldmann Verlag, München 2001. ISBN 3-442-41656-6 (Paperback)
- Die 13½ Leben des Käpt'n Blaubär, Eichborn Verlag, Frankfurt a.M. 2002. ISBN 3-8218-5159-7 (Audiobook)
- The 13½ Lives of Captain Bluebear, Overlook Hardcover, USA, 20 October 2005. ISBN 1-58567-724-8 (Hardcover)
- The 13½ Lives of Captain Bluebear, Overlook Trade paperback, USA, 29 August 2006. ISBN 1-58567-844-9 (Trade paperback)
- 13 1/2 življenj kapitana Sinjedlakca, Cankarjeva založba, SI, 2000. ISBN 961-231-204-4 (Hardcover)
- 13 a 1/2 života Kapitána Modrého Medvěda, Albatros, Česká republika- Czech Republic
- 13 1/2 života Kapetana Plavomedvedića, Zlatni zmaj, Serbia, 2013 ISBN 9788683495351 (Paperback)
