= Frank Arnau =

German crime fiction writer (1894–1976)

- Born: March 9, 1894; Vienna
- Died: February 11, 1976 (aged 81); Munich
- Occupation: crime fiction writer
- Writing career
- Genre: crime fiction

Frank Arnau (March 9, 1894 – February 11, 1976) was the pseudonym of a German crime fiction writer, born as Heinrich Schmitt.

== Biography ==
Arnau was born in Vienna, the son of a hotel manager.

He began his literary career as a newspaper journalist. With the political ascent of Hitler, this avowed opponent of National Socialism emigrated in 1933, first to France, then in 1939 to Brazil, where he lived until 1955. There he was further active as journalist and freelance writer. After his return to Germany he worked as a freelancer for Stern magazine.

Arnau wrote over a hundred books and was president of the German league for human rights. He wrote stage plays, novels, detective stories and critical studies about society and the legal system. In 1934 he described the ascent of the Nazis in his novel Die braune Pest (The Brown Plague).

In 1959 he published a book about counterfeiting art, entitled Kunst der Fälscher – Fälscher der Kunst. 3000 Jahre Betrug mit Antiquitäten (translated in English as The Art of the Faker - 3,000 Years of Deception).

He died at Munich in 1976.

== Works ==
=== Crime Fiction ===
- 1929 Der geschlossene Ring
- 1933 Männer der Tat
- 1944 Die Maske mit dem Silberstreifen
- 1953 Auch sie kannten Felix Umballer
- 1956 Pekari Nr 7
- 1957 Tanger nach Mitternacht
- 1957 Verwandlung nach Mitternacht
- 1957 Mordkommission Hollywood
- 1957 Der geschlossene Ring
- 1958 Nur tote Zeugen schweigen
- 1958 Jenseits aller Schranken
- 1958 Heisses Pflaster Rio
- 1958 Heißes Pflaster Rio
- 1959 Nur tote Zeugen schweigen
- 1959 Lautlos wie sein Schatten
- 1960 Der perfekte Mord
- 1960 Der letzte Besucher
- 1960 Das andere Gesicht
- 1961 Die Dame im Chinchilla
- 1961 Der letzte Besucher
- 1962 Heroin AG
- 1962 Im Schatten der Sphinx
- 1963 Der Mord war ein Regiefehler
- 1963 Schuss ohne Echo
- 1963 Verwandlung nach Mitternacht
- 1964 Der Mord war ein Regiefehler
- 1965 Mit heulenden Sirenen
- 1968 Das verbrannte Gesicht
- 1984 Das verschlossene Zimmer (posthumous)

=== Others ===
- 1934 Die braune Pest
- 1959 Kunst der Fälscher - Fälscher der Kunst. 3000 Jahre Betrug mit Antiquitäten.
- 1960 Brasilia. Phantasie und Wirklichkeit. Prestel-Verlag, München.
- 1962 Im Schatten der Sphinx
- 1964 Warum Menschen töten
- 1966 Jenseits der Gesetze
- 1967 Die Straf-Unrechtspflege in der Bundesrepublik
- 1971 Tatmotiv Leidenschaft
- 1972 Lexikon der Philatelie
- 1972 Gelebt, geliebt, gehasst (autobiography)
- 1974 Watergate - Der Sumpf

== Films ==
- Täter gesucht (1931, based on the novel Der geschlossene Ring)
- Contest (1932)
