= Walter Moers =

German comic creator and author (born 1957)

- Born: 24 May 1957 (age 69) Mönchengladbach, West Germany
- Occupation: Author, comic artist and illustrator
- Genre: Comics & Graphic Novels, Humor, Satire, Fantasy Literature

Walter Moers artist's mark

Website
- zamonien.de

Walter Moers (German: [ˈvaltɐ ˈmøːɐ̯s]; born 24 May 1957) is a German comic artist, illustrator and writer. He is the creator of the character of Captain Bluebear and became a best-selling author in Europe with his Zamonia novels.

== Life ==
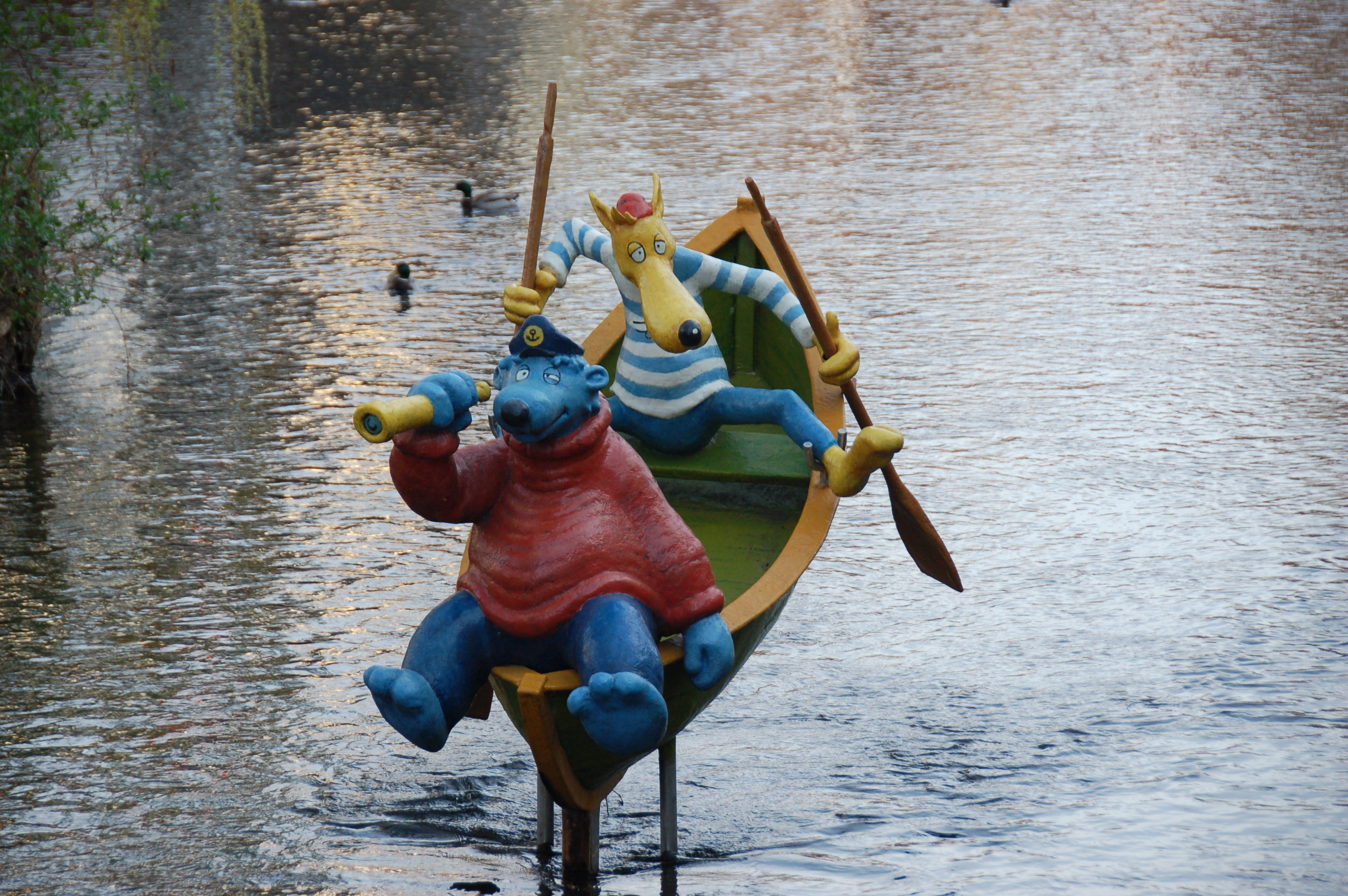
Captain Bluebear and Hein Blöd, characters created by Moers, on the Gera in Erfurt

Moers was born in Mönchengladbach. According to his own statements, he ended his school career prematurely and initially supported himself by doing odd jobs. He began a commercial apprenticeship, but did not finish it. The odd jobs included his first drawing commissions, such as little bedtime stories for the "Sandmännchen". Moers acquired his drawing skills through self-study.

Walter Moers is married and has lived in Hamburg since 1992. He is considered publicity-shy, does not make public appearances, gives his few interviews by e-mail and rarely allows himself to be photographed. The only recordings of him that exist are older photographs and a short film in the NDR archives showing Moers at an exhibition in 1994. Some of the few pictures also date from before 2000, and in the case of some of them it is disputed whether the person depicted is really Walter Moers. His dealings with the public have meanwhile become a kind of trademark, so that he is often dubbed a "phantom". Therefore, biographical information on Moers must be treated with caution, as there are few truly reliable sources.

== Work ==
=== Zamonia series ===
Walter Moers's Zamonia novels are works of fantasy literature presented as literary fragments of the world of Zamonia. In the course of the publications, Moers's authorship was fictitiously reduced further and further, from author and helper (The 13½ Lives of Captain Bluebear) to editor and illustrator (Ensel and Krete, The City of Dreaming Books) to second-tier editor (The Alchemaster's Apprentice).

The books are characterised by their intermedial and intertextual presentation. Thus, there are many references to other works of literature, film and music. The parallels are sometimes so obvious that the Zamonia novels have been called "plagiarism poetry" and "art of copying". However, the combination of maps, illustrations and texts in which the novels are written also contributes to the intermediality. Both adolescent and adult readers are given as the target audience, although it can be assumed that Moers intended the works primarily for adults. As of 2025 there are eleven books in the series, of which five have been translated to English:

- The 13½ Lives of Captain Bluebear (1999)
- Ensel und Krete (2000) (lit. 'Ensel and Krete')
- Rumo and His Miraculous Adventures (2003)
- The City of Dreaming Books (2004)
- The Alchemaster's Apprentice (2007)
- The Labyrinth of Dreaming Books (2011)
- Princess Insomnia & the Nightmare-colored Night-mare (2017)
- Weihnachten auf der Lindwurmfeste (2018) (lit. 'Christmas at the Lindworm Stronghold')
- Der Bücherdrache (2019) (lit. 'The Book Dragon')
- Die Insel der Tausend Leuchttürme (2023) (lit. 'The Island of a Thousand Lighthouses')
- Das Einhörnchen, das rückwärts leben wollte (2024) (lit. 'The Squirrel That Wanted to Live Backwards')
- Qwert: Ein Prinz-Kaltbluth-Roman in 43 Aventiuren (2025) (lit. 'Qwert: A Prince Kaltbluth Novel in 43 Adventures')

==== Language and style ====
Moers' style is overall strongly influenced by the tradition of the grotesque. The Zamonia novels are in themselves easy to understand and partly influenced by everyday language, and therefore belong more to popular literature. However, by repeatedly alluding to works that are usually considered "canonical" through intermedial and intertextual references, sometimes even whole set pieces, Moers blurs or negates the sometimes imaginary boundary between "high literature" and "trivial literature".

Among the obvious references are the dedication of entire novels; with Ensel und Krete, inspired by the Grimm's fairy tale of Hansel and Gretel, and The Alchemaster's Apprentice, behind which Gottfried Keller's novella Spiegel, das Kätzchen is hidden. In addition, elements from Mary Shelley's Frankenstein, William Goldman's The Princess Bride or Ray Bradbury's Fahrenheit 451 are evident.

==== Translations ====
Walter Moers' works have already been translated into over 20 languages, including mainly the Zamonia novels. Because of the many stylistic devices and word creations, translating Moers' novels is considered a particular challenge. For example, the translator of most of the works into English, John Brownjohn, describes how many names had to be Latinised and the large number of anagrams had to be re-imagined. Several works dealt with translation problems based on Walter Moers' works and showed difficulties in translating neologisms and phrasemes.

=== Comics ===
His best-known comic characters are:

- Das kleine Arschloch (English: The Little Asshole), a precocious and irreverent little boy who constantly gets one over on the adults.
- Der alte Sack (English: The Old Curmudgeon), a terminally ill old man in a wheel chair who makes sarcastic comments on what he sees.
- Adolf, die Nazisau (English: Adolf, the Nazi Swine), an absurd satirical interpretation of Adolf Hitler in today's world.
- Käpt'n Blaubär (English: Capt'n Bluebear), a sea-faring bear with blue fur, who spins ridiculous pirate yarns, all of which, he claims, are true.

== Bibliography ==
=== German Works ===
==== Children's Books ====
- Die Schimauski-Methode. 1987, ISBN 9783407780256.
- Käpt'n Blaubärs Seemannsgarn. 3 Bände, 1990. Volume 1, Opachens Mondfahrt, ISBN 9783473346516. Volume 2, Moby Duck, die weiße Riesenente, ISBN 9783473346523. Volume 3, Die Piraten von der Haifischbucht, ISBN 9783473346530

==== Satirical Comics ====
- Aha! 1985, ISBN 3821818255.
- Wenn er gut drauf ist, erläßt er alle Sünden. So treiben's die Klerikalen. 1985, ISBN 3821819472. (1990 republished as Die Klerikalen., ISBN 3821819642)
- Hey! 1986, ISBN 3821818271.
- Schweinewelt. 1987, ISBN 382181828X.
- Herzlichen Glückwunsch. 1988, ISBN 382181831X.
- Von ganzem Herzen. 1989, ISBN 3821818328.
- „Huhu!" 1989, ISBN 9783821818290.
- Schwulxx-Comix. 1990, ISBN 9783923102297.
- Kleines Arschloch. 1990, ISBN 382183000X.
- Das kleine Arschloch kehrt zurück. 1991, ISBN 3821829990.
- Schöne Geschichten. 1991, ISBN 3821829966.
- Schöner leben mit dem kleinen Arschloch. 1992, ISBN 3821829931.
- Es ist ein Arschloch, Maria! 1992, ISBN 3821829923.
- Der alte Sack, ein kleines Arschloch und andere Höhepunkte des Kapitalismus. 1993, ISBN 3821829877.
- Arschloch in Öl. 1993, ISBN 3821829761.
- Du bist ein Arschloch, mein Sohn. 1995, ISBN 3821829680.
- Sex und Gewalt. 1995, ISBN 3821829672.
- Peppi & Co (Moers' Tierleben). 1996 ISBN 3821829664
- Buckel & Co (Moers' Gruselkabinett). 1996, ISBN 3821829648.
- Vagina & Co (Moers' Liebesleben). 1996, ISBN 3821829656.
- Wenn der Pinguin zweimal klopft… 1997, ISBN 3821829850.
- Adolf. oder Adolf / 1, Äch bin wieder da. 1998, ISBN 3821829591.
- Feuchte Träume. 1999, ISBN 3821829583.
- Adolf, Teil 2. oder Adolf / 2, Äch bin schon wieder da!. 1999, ISBN 3821829524.
- Schamlos!. 2001, ISBN 9783473346530.
- Adolf, Der Bonker. 2006, ISBN 3492046460.
- Der Pinguin: A Very Graphic Novel. 2012, ISBN 9783813505283.
- Jesus total – Die wahre Geschichte. 2013, ISBN 9783813505313.
- Sex, Absinth und falsche Hasen – Eine Weltgeschichte der Kunst. 2013, ISBN 9783813505467.
- Adolf total – Alles über den Führer in einem Volume. 2016, ISBN 9783328100690.

==== Illustrated lyric poetry ====
- Das Tier. 1987, ISBN 9783821818306.

==== Illustrated prose ====
- Wilde Reise durch die Nacht. Hardcover, 2001, ISBN 382180890X, Softcover, ISBN 3442452910, audiobook, ISBN 3821851716.
- Der Fönig. Hardcover, 2002, ISBN 3821829478, Softcover, ISBN 345387398X, audiobook, ISBN 3821852224.

==== Zamonia series ====
- Die 13½ Leben des Käpt'n Blaubär. Hardcover, 1999, ISBN 3821829699, Softcover, ISBN 3442416566, audiobook, ISBN 3821851597.
- Ensel und Krete. Hardcover, 2000, ISBN 3821829494, Softcover, ISBN 3442450179, audiobook, ISBN 3821851643.
- Rumo & Die Wunder im Dunkeln. Hardcover, 2003, ISBN 3492045480, Softcover, ISBN 3492241778, audiobook, ISBN 3899031725.
- Die Stadt der Träumenden Bücher. Hardcover, 2004, ISBN 3492045499, Softcover, ISBN 3492246885, audiobook, ISBN 389903225X.
- Der Schrecksenmeister. Hardcover, 2007, ISBN 9783492049375, Softcover, ISBN 9783492253772, audiobook, ISBN 3899034074.
- Das Labyrinth der Träumenden Bücher. Print, 2011, ISBN 9783813503937, audiobook (CD) ISBN 9783867177719, audiobook (MP3-CD) ISBN 9783867178037.
- Prinzessin Insomnia & der alptraumfarbene Nachtmahr. Print, 2017, ISBN 9783813507850, E-Book ISBN 9783641220136, audiobook (MP3-CD) ISBN 9783844528091.
- Weihnachten auf der Lindwurmfeste. Print, 2018, ISBN 9783328600718, E-Book ISBN 9783641234706, audiobook ISBN 9783844530612.
- Der Bücherdrache. Print, 2019, ISBN 9783328600640, E-Book ISBN 9783844533231, audiobook ISBN 9783641234232.
- Die Insel der Tausend Leuchttürme. Print, 2023, ISBN 9783328600060, E-Book ISBN 9783641197827, audiobook ISBN 9783844529715.
- Das Einhörnchen, das rückwärts leben wollte. Print, 2024, ISBN 9783328603429, E-Book ISBN 9783641315221, audiobook ISBN 9783844551877.

==== Screenplay ====
- Kleines Arschloch – Der Film. 1997, ISBN 3821829605.
- Käpt'n Blaubär – Der Film. 1999, ISBN 3821829575.
- Das kleine Arschloch und der alte Sack – Sterben ist Scheiße. 2006
- Drachengespräche. 2007
- Adolf – Er ist wieder da! 2012

==== Graphic Novels ====
- Die Stadt der Träumenden Bücher. Volume 1, Knaus, Munich 2017, ISBN 9783813505016, Volume 2, Knaus, Munich 2018, ISBN 9783813505023.

=== Works available in English translation ===
==== Zamonia ====
- The 13½ Lives of Captain Bluebear, 2000 (UK) / 2005 (US), ISBN 9781441732552, including audiobook, 2010, ISBN 978-1441732590
- Rumo & His Miraculous Adventures : a novel in two books, 2004, ISBN 9780099472223, including audiobook, 2010, ISBN 978-1441757982
- The City of Dreaming Books, 2006. ISBN 978-1-58567-899-0, including audiobook, 2011, ISBN 978-1441757937
- The Alchemaster's Apprentice, 2009 (English Edn), ISBN 9781590202180, including audiobook, 2011, ISBN 978-1441757845
- The Labyrinth of Dreaming Books, 2012 (English Edn), ISBN 9781846556883

==== Others ====
- Little Asshole, 1991, Eichborn, ISBN 3-8218-2998-2
- A Wild Ride Through the Night, 2004, ISBN 9781585678730, including audiobook, 2012, ISBN 978-1441758064
