= Costly (album) =

Studio album by Ghost Ship
- Released: August 28, 2015
- Genres: Contemporary worship music, folk rock, Christian rock
- Length: 61:32
- Label: BEC

Ghost Ship chronology
The Good King (2013)	Costly (2015)	To the End (2019)

Costly is the second studio album by Ghost Ship. BEC Recordings released the album on August 28, 2015.

== Critical reception ==
Professional ratings
Review scores
Source	Rating
CCM Magazine	3.5/5 stars
The Christian Manifesto	3/5 stars
Christian Music Review	3.6/5
HM Magazine	4/5 stars
Jesus Freak Hideout	4.5/5 stars 3.5/5 stars
New Release Today	4/5 stars

Jordan Gonzalez, allotting the album four stars from HM Magazine, says, "Ghost Ship stands a head taller in that crowd." Awarding the album three and a half stars at CCM Magazine, Kevin Sparkman writes, "Costly rises to offer easy access points for those needing a message of Christ hope through song...There's a simplistic beauty at work here, leaving much room for spiritual communication." Mary Nikkel, giving the album four stars from New Release Today, states, "Especially for those looking for words of worship that they can sing honestly in the midst of hardship, Costly is a timely release well worth your time." Rating the album four and a half stars for Jesus Freak Hideout, Ryan Barbee describes, "The instrumentation is rich, the lyrics doctrinally and introspectively deep, and the production is fantastic." Scott Fryberger, signaling in three and a half review by Jesus Freak Hideout, says, "A solid mixture of country gospel, contemporary pop, and alternative, it's a little more radio-friendly than I'm used to enjoying, but it's not a bad album, and it'd fit well next to your Rend Collective or Third Day albums." Indicating in a four and a half star review at Jesus Freak Hideout, Mark Rice states, "Costly is without a doubt in the upper echelon of worship albums that have been released in 2015, and is destined for many repeat listens." Calvin Moore, rating the album three stars for The Christian Manifesto, writes, "Costly is a simple album." Giving the album a 3.6 out of five at Christian Music Review, Daniel Edgeman states, "The album is simple and smooth...recommend this album if you are looking for a smooth sound to your worship experience."

== Track listing ==
Track list
No.	Title	Length
1.	"Invitation"	3:53
2.	"Adoption"	4:21
3.	"Scarlet"	3:58
4.	"Look What God Has Done"	4:30
5.	"Heavy as the Sea"	4:17
6.	"When I Survey the Wondrous Cross (Jesus Saves)"	4:32
7.	"Peace"	5:15
8.	"Provide"	4:20
9.	"The Way"	3:38
10.	"Fear and Love"	3:50
11.	"You Loved Us First"	4:05
12.	"Poverty nor Riches"	4:54
13.	"The Revelation of Jesus Christ"	3:48
14.	"Hesed"	6:11
Total length:		61:32
