= Dietlof Reiche =

German author of children's books and books for young adults (born 1941)

Dietlof Reiche (born 1941) is a German author of children's books and books for young adults. He was born in Dresden and grew up in the village of Nördlingen. He studied engineering at university and was a teacher at Darmstadt Technical University for a while.

As an author, he is known above all for his series The Golden Hamster Saga. His many prizes include the German Juvenile Literature Award and the Oldenburg's Children's Book Prize.

In 2005, his novel Ghost Ship was published in the United States with a translation by John Brownjohn.

He lives in Hamburg, Germany.
