= The City of Dreaming Books =

2004 novel by Walter Moers

- Author: Walter Moers
- Original title: Die Stadt der Träumenden Bücher
- Translator: John Brownjohn
- Illustrator: Walter Moers
- Cover artist: Walter Moers
- Language: German
- Genre: Fantasy novel
- Publisher: German: Piper Verlag GmbH. English: Overlook TP
- Publication date: 2004
- Publication place: Germany
- English publication date: 2007
- Media type: Print (hardcover)
- ISBN: 978-1-58567-899-0
- OCLC: 149009059

The City of Dreaming Books (original title: Die Stadt der Träumenden Bücher) is the fourth novel in the Zamonia series written and illustrated by German author Walter Moers, but the third to be translated into English by John Brownjohn. The German version was released in Autumn 2004, and the English version followed in Autumn 2007. It is followed by The Labyrinth of Dreaming Books (2011).

== Plot ==
Protagonist Optimus Yarnspinner (Hildegunst von Mythenmetz in the German text) is a Lindworm (a species of bibliophile dinosaurs) who inherits a perfectly written manuscript from his mentor. Its author went to Bookholm, the center of the Zamonian book trade, and was not heard of again.

Seeking adventure as well as inspiration for his own writing, Optimus travels to Bookholm in search of the mysterious author. A publisher directs him to Pfistomefel Smyke (Phistomefel Smeik in the German text), who controls the book trade by means of musical hypnosis. Smyke pretends to help, but then reveals that he hates art and that a truly gifted author would raise the bar and hurt the market for mass-produced fiction. Smyke drugs Optimus and transfers him to the catacombs of Bookholm.

The catacombs are a labyrinth of old, disused shops and storerooms beneath the city. They are inhabited by all kinds of monsters as well as bookhunters, brutish mercenaries who only care for the high prices that rare old books can fetch on the surface. As Optimus tries to navigate the labyrinth, he falls victim to a bookhunter’s trap and almost gets eaten by a spider-like sphinx. A bookhunter saves him, only to try and to sell Optimus’ body parts as trophies to fans of lindworm literature. The hunter is killed by an unseen force.

By means of hypnosis, Optimus is guided to the cave of the booklings, a race of one-eyed creatures who live by reading and memorizing books. There he finds some respite, but when the cave is attacked by bookhunters, Optimus has to flee again.

Optimus comes to Shadowhall Castle, home of the Shadow King, a giant who is the mortal enemy of bookhunters. The Shadow King reveals himself to be the mysterious author of the manuscript. Many years ago, he showed his manuscript to Smyke and was transformed into a golem made of an alchemistic paper that is nearly indestructible but will catch fire if exposed to natural light. He was banished to the catacombs and Smyke put a price on his head, leading to the Shadow King’s feud with the bookhunters. After several interactions in which the Shadow King acts in a fearsome and erratic manner towards Optimus, it is revealed that he wanted to tutor Optimus in the art of writing but felt too prideful to offer it outright.

The Shadow King takes Optimus close to the surface where they are ambushed by the bookhunters. The booklings save them by hypnotizing the bookhunters so that they kill themselves. The Shadow King confronts Smyke and steps into the sun, setting himself aflame before chasing after Smyke into the catacombs, igniting everything in his path. The resulting fire destroys Bookholm. Optimus flees with a copy of the antique and fearsome Bloody Book and embarks on his own literary career.

== Wordplay ==
The names of many of the authors listed in The City of Dreaming Books are anagrams of famous authors. Below are a few listed in alphabetical order by the last name of the real-world author:

- Ojahnn Golgo van Fontheweg = Johann Wolfgang von Goethe
- Ergor Banco = Roger Bacon
- Lugo Blah (a Zamonian Gagaist) = Hugo Ball (a German Dadaist)
- Hornac de Bloaze = Honoré de Balzac
- Rashid el Clarebeau = Charles Baudelaire
- Bethelzia B. Binngrow = Elizabeth B. Browning
- Trebor Snurb = Robert Burns
- Selwi Rollcar = Lewis Carroll
- Auselm T. Edgecroil = Samuel T. Coleridge
- Asdrel Chickens = Charles Dickens
- Evsko Dosti = (Fyodor) Dostoevski
- Doylan Cone (Author of Sir Ginel) = Conan Doyle (author, among other works, of Sir Nigel)
- Samoth Yarg = Thomas Gray
- Dolreich Hirnfiedler = Friedrich Hölderlin
- Ugor Vochti = Victor Hugo
- Honj Steak = John Keats
- Melvin Hermalle = Herman Melville
- Gramerta Climelth (Author of Gone with the Tornado) = Margaret Mitchell
- Perla la Gadeon = Edgar Allan Poe
- Inka Almira Rierre = Rainer Maria Rilke
- T. T. Kreischwurst = Kurt Schwitters
- Aliesha Wimperslake = William Shakespeare
- Elo Slooty = Leo Tolstoy
- Rasco Elwid = Oscar Wilde
- Wamilli Swordthrow = William Wordsworth
- Rimidalv Vokoban (author of "Love and the Generation Gap") = Vladimir Nabokov (author of Lolita, about the paedophilic passion of a middle-aged European professor for the eponymous heroine)
- Gofid Letterkerl = Gottfried Keller
- Ertrob Slimu = Robert Musil

The City of Dreaming Books also contains fictional words, found in most of Moers' work. Some are onomatopoeic; others are amalgamations of existing words or Indo-European roots; still others are created by the author. Many such words can be found in Chapter 60. A sample of these are listed below:

- "fructodism:" the sensation experienced when squeezing an orange until it becomes soft.
- "rumbumblion:" the sound produced by a volcanic eruption.
- "indigabluntic:" one of a number of derogatory epithets.
- "nasodiscrepant:" a person whose nostrils are notably different in size.
- "glunk:" a sound some animals — including lindworms — can make with their teeth, indicating pleasure or satisfaction, particularly with a certain food

== Sequels ==
=== The Labyrinth of Dreaming Books ===
A sequel, The Labyrinth of Dreaming Books, has been released, wherein Yarnspinner, now a best-selling author, receives a letter apparently from himself, and visits a rebuilt Bookholm in search of its origin. There, he becomes engrossed in 'Puppetism', the variety of puppet-theatres now ubiquitous in the city, and intrigued by the emulation, among Bookhunters, of Colophonius Regenschein. This second book ends in a cliffhanger, featuring Yarnspinner alone in the still-enormous catacombs, with implication that the 'Shadow King' is alive.

==== Wordplay ====
The list of fictional authors, anagramming the names of historical authors, continues or repeats in the sequel, expanded therein to include musicians and artists. These include (but are not limited to):

- Orphetu Harnschauer = Arthur Schopenhauer
- Nartinian Schneidhasser = Hans Christian Andersen
- Plaidy Kurding = Rudyard Kipling
- Trebor Sulio Vessenton = Robert Louis Stevenson
- Rubert Jashem = James Thurber
- Joghan Rimsh = John Grisham
- Volkodir Vanabim = Vladimir Nabokov
- Wilma Kleballi = William Blake
- Eiderich Fischnertz = Friedrich Nietzsche
- Odion la Vivanti = Antonio Vivaldi
- Perla la Gadeon = Edgar Allan Poe
- Evubeth van Goldwine = Ludwig van Beethoven
- Freechy Jarfer = Jeffrey Archer
- Arlis Worcell = Lewis Carroll
- Edd van Murch = Edvard Munch
- Crederif Pincho = Frédéric Chopin

Many are identified with their models by reference to the subject of their works.

=== The Castle of Dreaming Books ===
A third book in the Dreaming Books trilogy was announced following the release of The Labyrinth of Dreaming Books, originally for October 2015. However, it has been indefinitely delayed and as of August 2026 there has been no further information about a possible release date. It It is believed to continue directly from the end of the previous book.
