= Soul Kitchen (film) =

2009 German comedy film

- Theatrical poster
- Directed by: Fatih Akın
- Written by: Fatih Akın; Adam Bousdoukos
- Produced by: Corazon International
- Starring: Adam Bousdoukos; Birol Ünel; Moritz Bleibtreu; Anna Bederke
- Cinematography: Rainer Klausmann
- Edited by: Andrew Bird
- Production company: Corazon International
- Release date: 2009
- Running time: 99 minutes
- Country: Germany
- Language: German

Soul Kitchen is a 2009 German comedy film directed by Fatih Akın, with a screenplay by Akın and Adam Bousdoukos, based on Bousdoukos' story on his own experiences as the owner of a Greek tavern named "Taverna", where Akın was a regular customer.

== Plot ==
Zinos, a Greek restaurant owner, owns Soul Kitchen, a shabby, run-down restaurant providing working-class food in the Hamburg area, in an old warehouse space. The business is struggling financially, and tax inspectors ask Zinos for payments. Occasionally a punk rock band uses the restaurant as practice space, but never pays rental fees. An old sailor, Sokrates, continuously works on his boat at the warehouse but is never able to pay the rent.

At a family gathering at an upscale restaurant, Zinos argues with his girlfriend Nadine, a journalist, who is preparing to leave on assignment to Shanghai. During that dinner, the chef, Shayn, is fired. Afterward, Zinos meets an old schoolmate, Thomas Neumann, who has become successful in real estate. In spite of their arguments over Nadine's assignment to Shanghai, Zinos and Nadine maintain contact via Skype. Zinos' brother Illias, a gambler and hustler, is serving a prison sentence, and is granted "special leave" to leave the prison and go to work. Even though he doesn't need more staff and can't afford to pay Illias, Zinos agrees to hire his brother, to the disdain of bartender Lucia. Illias asks Zinos not to tell anyone about his criminal past. When he tries to move a heavy dishwasher, Zinos injures his back. Nadine recommends that he see a physical therapist, Anna, who teaches him exercises and movements to ease the back pain.

Zinos locates Shayn and hires him as Soul Kitchen's new cook. Shayn insists on dropping the cheap comfort food menu in favor of haute cuisine. This drives away the old clientele and shrinks business to nearly nothing. Sensing the restaurant is failing, Neumann offers to purchase the building to redevelop the property. Zinos repeatedly refuses to sell. Gradually, after attracting a young, hip clientele, the restaurant's reputation and fortunes turn around, and Zinos makes a cash tax payment to the authorities. Lucia changes her opinion of Illias and begins to find herself attracted to him. But Zinos, whilst drunk, had revealed to Lucia that Illias has a criminal record, which enrages Illias.

Zinos had hoped to travel to Shanghai to meet Nadine, but the new success of Soul Kitchen keeps him distracted from maintaining contact with her. Zinos plans a surprise trip to Shanghai, and appoints Illias manager of Soul Kitchen, with full power of attorney. At the airport, Zinos sees Nadine arriving, accompanied by a Chinese man, Mr. Han. She has returned following the sudden death of her grandmother. At the funeral, Zinos realizes that Mr. Han is Nadine's new boyfriend. Zinos disrupts the funeral and becomes estranged from Nadine and her family.

In Zinos' absence, Illias loses the Soul Kitchen to Neumann in a poker game and is forced to sign away the deed. To try to prevent completion of the deal, Zinos, Illias and accomplices plan to steal the title deed. The theft fails and the brothers are arrested. Zinos is released, but Illias is kept confined. In a desperate move to cure Zinos's herniated disc, Anna takes him to a chiropractor, Kemal "the Bone Cruncher", whose extreme therapy succeeds.

Zinos is despondent at losing both his restaurant and Nadine. Lucia has found employment at another restaurant, and Shayn has apparently left the country altogether. In a sudden twist, however, the tax authorities arrest and convict Neumann of tax fraud, and the Soul Kitchen property is offered at auction. Because Nadine is now wealthy from her grandmother's inheritance, Zinos begs her for a loan. Zinos wins the auction and buys back the restaurant. Although in prison, Illias continues his relationship with Lucia. The film ends with the restaurant closed for a "private party" for Zinos and Anna, who is visiting Soul Kitchen for the first time.

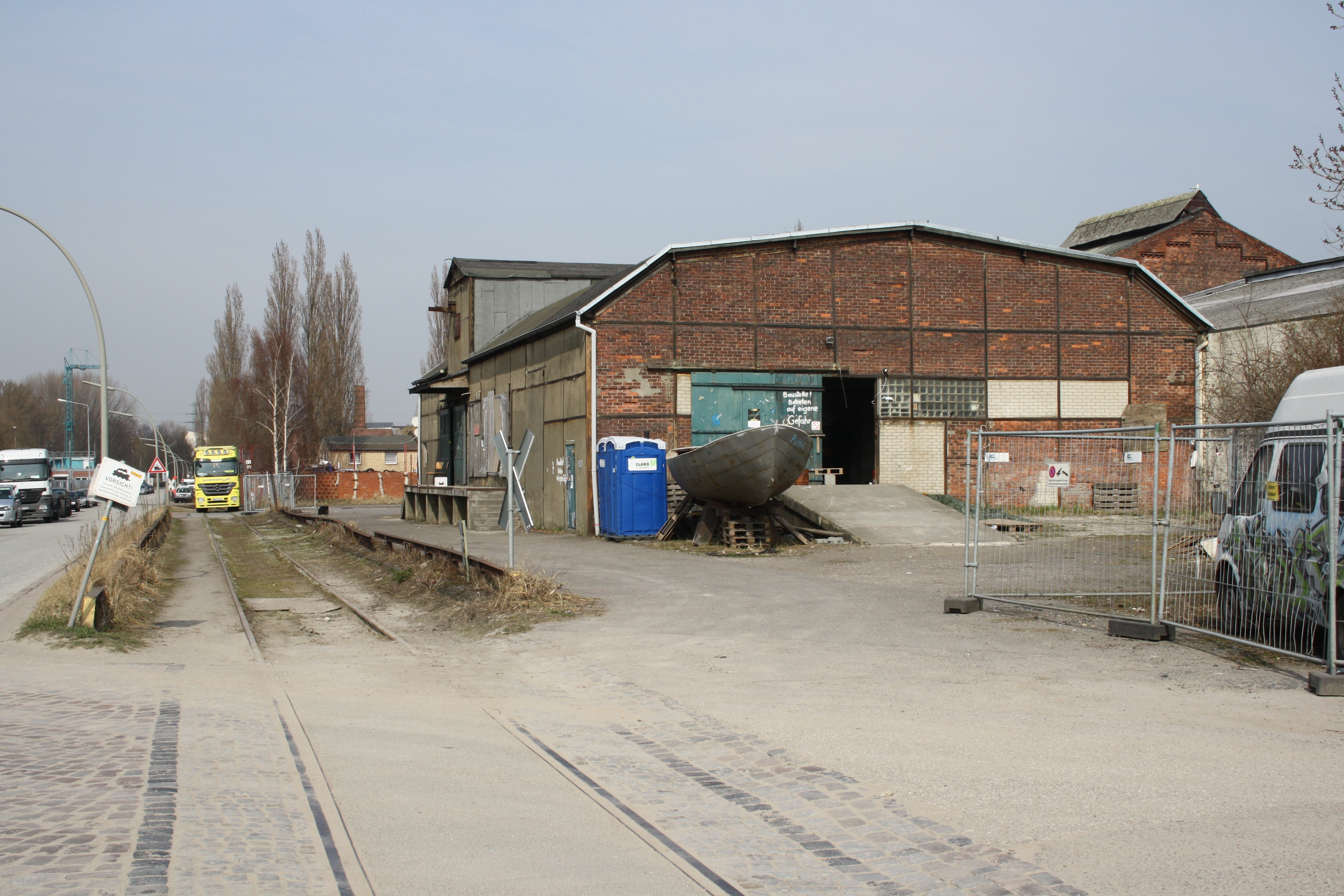
The Soul Kitchen

== Cast ==
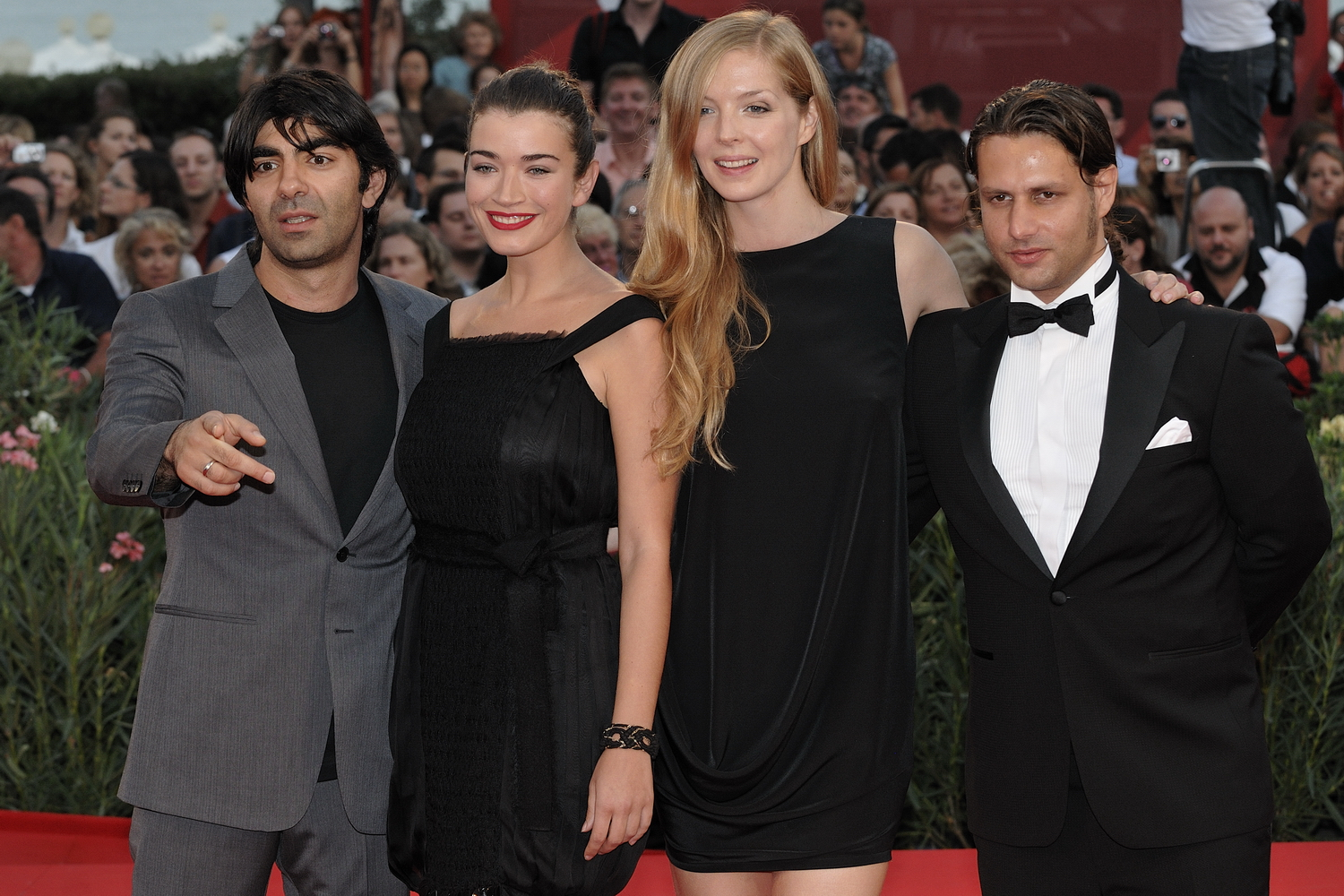
Akın, Bederke, Roggan and Bousdoukos in Venice 2009

- Adam Bousdoukos as Zinos Kazantsakis
- Birol Ünel as Shayn Weiss
- Moritz Bleibtreu as Illias Kazantsakis
- Anna Bederke as Lucia Faust
- Pheline Roggan as Nadine Krüger
- Dorka Gryllus as Anna Mondstein
- Wotan Wilke Möhring as Thomas Neumann
- Lucas Gregorowicz as Lutz
- Demir Gökgöl as Sokrates
- Udo Kier as Herr Jung
- Monica Bleibtreu as Grandma Krüger
- Marc Hosemann as Ziege
- Cem Akın as Milli
- Jan Fedder as Herr Meyer
- Catrin Striebeck as Frau Schuster
- Uğur Yücel as "Bonebreaker" Kemal
- Maria Ketikidou as policewoman
- Hendrik von Bültzingslöwen as assistant to Frau Schuster
- Julia Wachsmann as Tanja
- Maverick Quek as Mr. Han
- Markus Imboden as Nadine's father
- Gudrun Egner as Nadine's mother
- Arne Benzing, Piotr Gregorowicz, Hans Ludwiczak, and Jan Weichsel as Bad Boy Boogiez Band musicians
- Peter Jordan as notary

== Background ==
Fatih Akin dedicated the film to his brother Cem. According to the filmmaker, "our theme is the relationship between brothers" The film is also dedicated "in memory of" Monica Bleibtreu, the actress who died in 2009 and who has "her last major appearance" in the role of Nadine's grandmother.

The director also dedicates the film to his hometown of Hamburg.

Because of its themes, Akin also calls the film, set in Hamburg, a modern Heimat film (Heimatfilm). It's about "Family and friends, about love, trust, and loyalty – and about the fight for home as a place that needs to be protected in an increasingly volatile world." There are numerous well-known actors from Akin's previous productions in the film, such as Moritz Bleibtreu (Im Juli, Solino) Birol Ünel (Im Juli, Gegen die Wand), and Adam Bousdoukos (Sensin – Du bist es!, Kurz und schmerzlos). Akins film company calls it a "best-of" cast.

The "patron and landmark" for the film, according to the filmmaker, was Billy Wilder. Akin had hung a poster of him over his desk while working on the comedy.

According to Die Welt, director Fatih Akin also supported Hamburg's gang district, which is threatened with destruction, by using around 200 artists in the film. "The planned demolition of the historic district is an example of the city of Hamburg neglecting its heritage. When he advertises his new film Soul Kitchen, he also advertises the monuments of the Hanseatic city," the newspaper reported.

The film is the director's first self-produced full-length comedy, following Akin's co-writing of Kebab Connection (2005). Akin repeatedly emphasized the special difficulty that the genre prepared him for ("comedy is the supreme discipline").

The unusual dishes from the new chef Shayn in Soul Kitchen are from Isabel Allende's cookbook Aphrodite. A Celebration of the Senses (1997) was also an inspiration. Birol Ünel was coached for the role of the chef by Joern Martens and Hamburg's top chef Ali Güngörmüş.

It is thanks to the fact that Ünel read Arthur Rimbaud while on set that the Rimbaud quote "What cannot be sold will be sold!" was subsequently written into the screenplay.

The severe horse fall scene in the film is a recording of the real fall of rider Katharina Werning at a gallop race in Neuss in early 2008. After this fall, she had to temporarily interrupt her career.

Lutz, the waiter at Soul Kitchen, has the band the Bad Boy Boogiez, which happens to be the actual band of Lutz's actor, Lucas Gregorowicz.

Although Soul Kitchen is an adaptation of an original screenplay, the film was one of the four titles shortlisted for best International Literary Adaptation at the 2009 Frankfurt Book Fair, which coincided with the film's prequel novel, Soul Kitchen. The first part of the story was created by the previously unknown author Jasmin Ramadan. Juergen Boos underpinned what he called an "experiment" decision:

For me, this film is exciting because it shows how the industries are growing together – blogs, pictures, original sounds, it will be tweeted. In Soul Kitchen by Fatih Akin, the book and film are created together and influence each other. The great things is that the book, which deals with the beginning of the film, is being published by a literary publisher (...).

Soul Kitchen is the first Fatih Akin film to be released as a radio play with the original voice acting from the film version, with an additional first-person narrator (Zinos, voiced by Adam Bousdoukos). It went on sale at the start of the film's release.

=== Origins ===
The film Soul Kitchen was already planned in 2003/2004 as a direct follow-up project to Head On (Gegen die Wand). Therefore, the first phase of work on the film falls ahead of Akin's international breakthrough as a director.

According to Akin, he wanted to try out a new text program on his computer and "started writing without a vision, without an idea (...)." At the time, his friend Adam Bousdoukos had just been dumped by his then-girlfriend and was also having professional problems. At the time, he was the owner of the Greek tavern Sotiris at Barnerstraße 42 in Hamburg-Ottensen and ran the Glam Slam Music Club at Bahrenfelder Straße 237. Akin took Bousdoukos' life crisis as an opportunity to write down his story: "I just jammed around with the new program. On the very first day I had written 20 script pages. The first version was completed after five days. I gave them to my partner, Andreas Thiel [...]. He read it and said, 'Let's make a movie out of this!'" described the director of the first phase of the script. After the Golden Bear award for Head On, however, he had doubts about the project; it suddenly seemed "not important enough anymore". A "snotty comedy" apparently no longer met his expectations, so he preferred to "put on something more serious, bigger".

In 2004, during the filming of the music documentary film, Crossing The Bridge – The Sound of Istanbul, Akin's plans to cast the comedy with Hanna Schygulla in the role of the band's pianist as the leading actress were revealed. The 2004 Yearbook of the DEFA Foundation Apropos, Film already reported a later scriptwriting phase in the works for the film. It was created as the second part of Akin's planned trilogy about love, death, and the devil. Then the project was finally shelved and even discarded in connection with the film trilogy. In the drama The Edge of Heaven (2007), which was created instead as the second part of the trilogy, Schygulla remained the only actress planned for the film.

Between these and other projects (initially without further concrete plans for a film adaptation), Soul Kitchen was "further developed from time to time on a whim. Whenever we didn't have anything better to do or wanted to distract ourselves, we had a good time with Soul Kitchen," says Akin. According to Akin, however, when Andreas Thiel died shortly before the end of filming The Edge of Heaven (Auf der anderen Seite), his view of the postponed project changed. Thiel always said about Soul Kitchen: "Don't give a shit what people say. Do it anyway!" But it was only after the death of his friend that he was able to take these words to heart.

First, Akin planned another western with Bousdoukos; however, after a research trip to America, it became clear that Akin would not be able to produce this western starring his friend. According to the filmmaker, this was the final reason for resuming the Soul Kitchen project:

At the end of the trip, we sat in a motel in Albuquerque. I said to (Bousdoukos): We won't make it together. I need a budget of 15 million for the film. I can't get that financed with you. I need someone like Johnny Depp for that. Sorry! He asked: And now? So I said: Let's go to Hamburg and do Soul Kitchen.

Actual film work on the comedy took two years, with the goal of completion for the Cannes Film Festival in May 2009, to which the film had already received an invitation. However, due to incomplete post-production, Akin had to cancel participation in the festival. The director told the Hamburger Abendblatt (Hamburg Evening Newspaper) that Jan Delay only wanted to decide after a preview whether one of his songs could be used in the film that he thought was already ready for Cannes. After seeing the film, the musician said: "I don't think you're done yet. The film doesn't have the right groove yet." Akin then began extensive post-production and partly re-shot scenes.

Due to the international success of The Edge of Heaven, Akin had to turn down offers to shoot in Hollywood in order to make the film. His main actor, Moritz Bleibtreu, even decided not to play in Quentin Tarantino's Inglorious Bastards (2009) because he had already been promised a role in Soul Kitchen.

Akin filed a lawsuit in early 2010 against Alexander Wallasch, who claimed to have seen "striking similarities" between his debut novel Hotel Monopol and Soul Kitchen. Wallasch lost, so an injunction against him remained in place.

=== Filming location ===
The filming locations of Soul Kitchen are places in Hamburg-Wilhelmsburg that have potential to be affected by change. They reflect an overarching theme of the film, the Soul Kitchen's waitstaff's struggle against gentrification. For example, the film "the Mandarin Casino, formerly the Mojo Club, on the Reeperbahn, the Astrastube on the Sternbrücke, or a club in the Karstadt branch where Akin once bought his first record". The Soul Kitchen restaurant was created for the film in a factory building on Industriestraße in Hamburg-Wilhelmsburg. Since June 18, 2010, the hall has been used for a variety of music and cultural events.

In addition, the "beautiful and touristy sides of the Hanseatic metropolis with the Speicherstadt, Elbe and Alster" can also be seen in the film. The cemetery scene was filmed at the Riensberg Cemetery in Bremen. The prison scenes were filmed in the Bremen correctional facility.

=== Soundtrack ===
Michael Giltz (The Huffington Post) called the soundtrack of the film "a blast". It contains different versions of the song "La Paloma", which is played "live" in the Soul Kitchen. Also, in the film the audience can hear songs by Quincy Jones, Kool & The Gang, the Isley Brothers, Mongo Santamaría, Markos Vamvakaris, and Jan Delay. The film ends with Louis Armstrong's cover of "The Creator Has a Master Plan". Hans Albers is represented with the hit song "Das letzte Hemd hat leider keine Taschen" (The Last Shirt Unfortunately has no Pockets). The song "Soul Kitchen" by the Doors was originally intended to be played in a scene, but the rights to the track were ultimately too expensive for the filmmaker, so he exchanged it for a song by Curtis Mayfield. The rights to an older song by Prince, the main character's absolute favorite musician in the Soul Kitchen novel, could not be acquired for the film due to long-standing differences between Prince and Warner Brothers.

A soundtrack was released on CD by Universal Music and in the first week of 2010 was the second highest new entry in the German album charts behind the Avatar soundtrack. The double album, which was released in several countries, was in the top three of the general sales charts in Greece.

== Reception ==
=== Festival reception ===
At the "convincing" (dpa) world premiere with an international audience in Venice, there was roaring laughter and applause. The Süddeutsche Zeitung (The South-German Newspaper) stated: "The real heartbreaker of the festival is (...) the German competition entry." Akin's film was "so funny and touching that the audience in Venice was over the moon."

The film later won the second most important prize at the festival. Fatih Akin said: "We shot a comedy with local Hamburg color. If Italians and Americans also jump on it, the main goal has apparently been achieved."

The film's humor was also well received at the press screenings the night before; Katja Nicodemus from SWR noticed that the reactions from the Italian press were even better than the German ones.

Soul Kitchen was also "very well received" at the American premiere at the following Toronto International Film Festival. But with the city's "open, multicultural audience", there was no reason to expect anything else.

In Germany, the film was first shown in 2009 as the opening film of the Hamburg Film Festival, in line with the main theme of pulsating metropolises. Albert Wiederspiel said before the screening: "What could be nicer for a film festival director than to open with such a film!" In fact, "never (...) has an opening film been so celebrated" in the Hanseatic city like this one. The Hamburger Abendblatt reported at least "30 times (...) an enthusiastic applause, always collective laughter". The film festival already has experienced many spectacular openings, but what happened (...) in the Cinemaxx set new standards. Soul Kitchen ran in three halls, but even the almost 1700 seats were hardly enough to offer space to all those who had gotten hold of one of the coveted invitations. Long before the start, it was impossible to get into Cinemaxx 1 and 3 even with a ticket, and there were some audience members sitting on the narrow steps of the theater.

At about the same time, it became known that Soul Kitchen had been nominated for the North German Film Prize and would also be shown at the Nordic Film Days in Lübeck in 2009. In 2009, the film had already received several international awards. Further international nominations followed in 2010, some of which were for important film prizes (see Awards section).

As of September 2009, the film was screened in festivals in Italy, Canada, Japan, Belgium, Brazil, Greece, and France. In December, the film started regularly screening in Greece, Germany, Austria, and Switzerland. Further screenings followed at international film festivals and, until July 2011, there were regular screenings in Turkey, Italy, Russia, Kazakhstan, France, Belgium, Brazil, Spain, Slovenia, Portugal, Australia, the Netherlands, Israel, Romania, Denmark, Norway, Finland, Hungary, Sweden, Estonia, Poland, Japan, Argentina, and Hong Kong. A theatrical release in the USA was negotiated, but was only shown in New York at festivals.

=== Reviews ===
Derek Elley from Variety saw in the film a "love letter to the place (Hamburg) and its people" with partly "explosive comedy", tightly staged and edited. Mark Olsen (Los Angeles Times) called Soul Kitchen "a rollicking comedy". Michael Giltz of The Huffington Post also called Akin one of the best directors by far of the time and hoped that this "light" comedy, which gives "much cause for celebration", will now reach "the wider audience [Akin] deserves.

The film was very well received in the United States, earning very positive reviews from American film critics, both for the story and the film's production. The film was also well received by the American audiences.

Peter Zander of Die Welt described the work, which Akin identified as a "dirty heimat film", simply as "indulgence". A "colorful, eloquent tone (...) that can't find an end to all the gags, relaxed funny" rules in Soul Kitchen for Christina Tilmann from the Berliner Tagesspiegel. In her estimation, however, the film is "by no means as weird and evil as it wants to be". For Anke Westphal from the Berliner Zeitung, on the other hand, the comedy "bursts with energy". A "big, colorful, swinging comedy mess full of temper tantrums" left the review "in tears". The German Press Agency reported that "good actors, humor bordering on the grotesque, and some situational comedy (...) make up the charm of Soul Kitchen, even if it "at times drifts into slapstick". Cristina Nord from the Taz found the film "rough around the edges", although she found occasional "admirable nonsense" in it. Frank Olbert from the Kölner Stadt-Anzeiger, on the other hand, warned against considering Soul Kitchen only as a feel-good piece because "that would mean reducing it. Soul Kitchen is a gentle homage to a place and its visitors, it's a heimat film with Germans, Greeks, and Turks." "Having to say goodbye to the film brings a nice dash of melancholy." Above all, however, it is also a "fantastic actor's film." The review of the Frankfurter Rundschau particularly emphasized Birol Ünel, who makes himself "unforgettable as a kind of samurai of the art of cooking" in his scenes. The screenplay compares Daniel Kothenschulte "with a mixed bag: there is a little trump card in every scene. The jokes in the dialogue are not fake, but rather develop naturally from the characters and the situations they get into.

The 3sat program Kinokino called Soul Kitchen a "totally unpretentious masterpiece" that was "simply great" and agreed with the filmmaker: "a heimat film!", as did ttt – tiel, thesen, temperamente on ARD, where a satisfied reviewer added: "I experienced what I want to experience on a nice evening at the movies. I cried, I sympathized, I was sad, I laughed a lot. So a great film. Perhaps the most beautiful and best film by Fatih Akin".

‚'Heimat comedy' is about the search for security in a rapidly changing urban world, one that is less about a place than about being rooted in a community and an attitude towards life. With verve and a feeling for cinematic space, for music and sometimes bawdy situational comedy, the film rounds off to a harmonious, atmospheric celebration of human cohesion.

— Lexikon des internationalen Films

=== Audience reception ===
Akin at the presentation of Soul Kitchen in Vienna (2009). Soul Kitchen was not only well received by the trade press and the festival audience. In Germany, Akin's comedy had by far the most successful theatrical release ever in terms of admissions. Already on the first weekend, 160,000 people saw the film. At the end of the first week, Soul Kitchen was number 5 in the German cinema charts. . After ten days, more than half a million people had seen the film. The film was also in the top ten in the Swiss and Austrian cinema charts.

Prior to this, Akin had been touring the German-speaking world with the lead cast throughout December to promote his upcoming comedy. On the so-called Soul-Kitchen-Cinema-Tour, the film was presented in up to three cities a day.

In other countries like Italy and Greece, the film later was successfully shown in theaters.

== Festivals (selection) ==
=== 2009 to 2010 ===
- Internationale Filmfestspiele von Venedig 2009
- Toronto International Film Festival
- Deutsches Filmfestival in Tokyo
- Gent International Film Festival
- São Paulo International Film Festival
- Thessaloniki International Film Festival
- Les Arcs Film Festival
- Transilvanian International Film Festival (Cluj, 2010)

== Awards ==
- Soul Kitchen received an invitation to compete at the 2009 Venice Film Festival, where Akin's film competed for the Gold Lion. In the end, the film won the Silver Lion for the "Grand Jury Prize", the second most important award in the competition.
- In Venice, Soul Kitchen was also given the "Young Cinema Award" by an international audience jury.
- "Art Cinema Award" from the International Association of Artistic Theaters (C.I.C.A.E.) at the Hamburg Film Festival 2009.
- Inclusion in the shortlist for the best international literary adaptation at the Frankfurt Book Fair 2009.
- North German Film Award 2009 in the category "Best Screenplay"
- third place in the Kulturnews Awards 2009 (category: Best Book) for the Book Before the Film.
- Nominations for the German Film Critics' Prize: Rainer Klausman (camera), Andrew Bird (editing).
- Nominations for the German Film Award 2010 in the categories Best Film and Editing.
- Nomination for the David di Donatello 2010 as best film from an EU country.
- Nomination for the European Film Awards 2010 as best film.
- North German Film Award 2010 in the category "Best Feature Film".

== The "Book Before the Film" ==
Similar to Akin's previous work The Edge of Heaven, the film promotes a book by a German author. However, Jasmin Ramadan's novel Soul Kitchen, published by Blumenbar, has just as little basis for the film as Selim Özdogan's novel The Blacksmith's Daughter in The Edge of Heaven, so it is not a "book based on the film" in the traditional sense. According to the blurbs, Ramadan's book is "the book before the film" and "the first part of the story". In fact, it was released on September 10, 2009, months before the German theatrical release of the comedy planned for Christmas 2009 and tells only the story before it, the one "between the coming of age and the road movie". Ramadan's debut novel has received widespread critical acclaim.

There was also an audio book released.
