= Daniel Puente Encina =

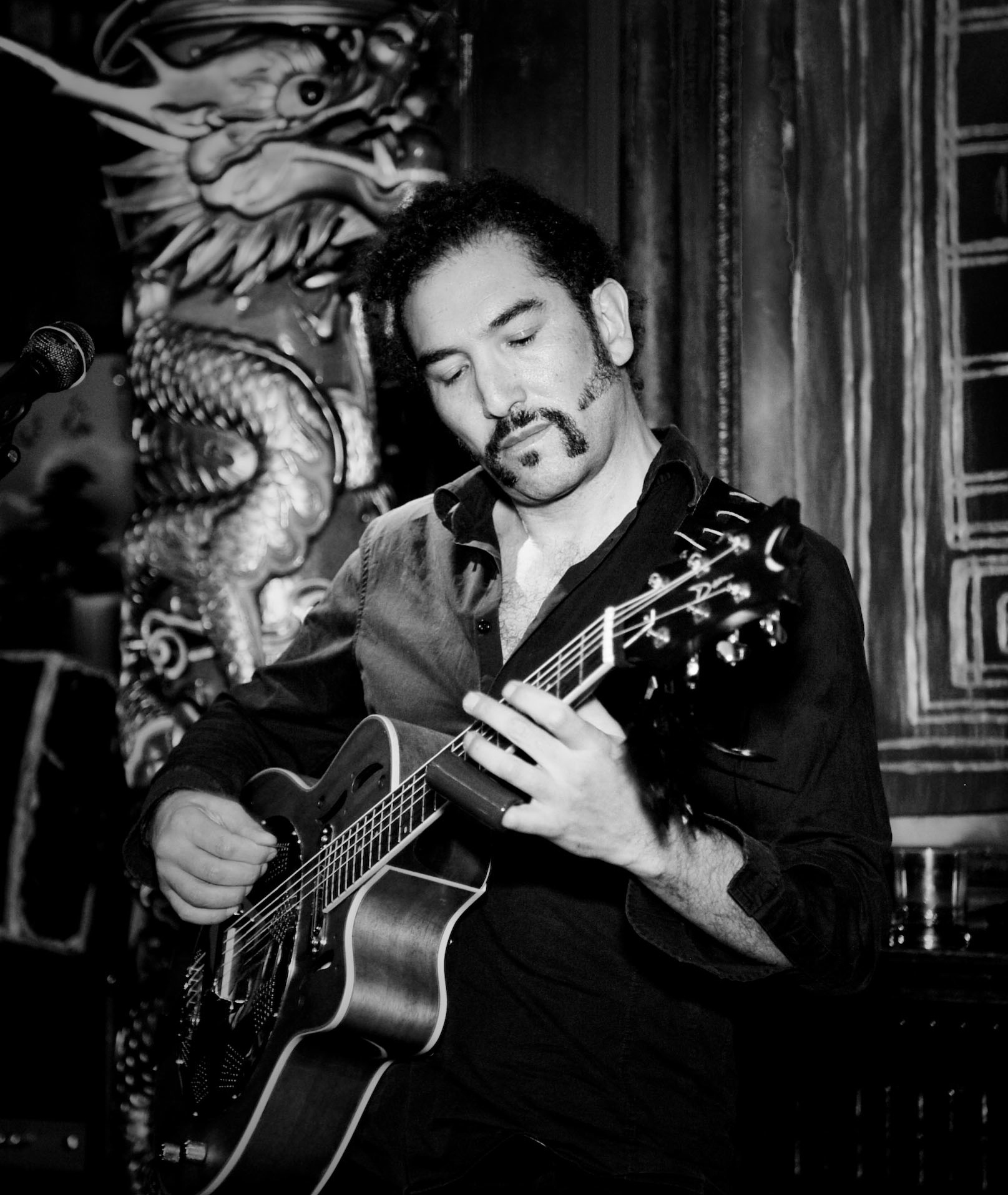
- Daniel Puente Encina with Dobro (2013)

Background information
- Also known as: Daniel Puente, Dani Puente
- Born: Santiago de Chile
- Genres: Singer-songwriter; crossover jazz; Latin blues; Latin jazz; Latin alternative; world music; music of Latin America; independent music; desert rock
- Occupations: Musician; singer-songwriter; composer; producer; film composer; actor
- Instruments: Vocals; guitar; charango; bass; percussion; keyboards
- Years active: 1984–present
- Labels: Polvorosa; Intercord; Potomak; Grita! Records
- Website: www.danielpuenteencina.com

Daniel Puente Encina (Santiago de Chile, 1965) is a Chilean singer-songwriter, guitarist, film composer, producer and actor known for his bands such as the anti-fascist Pinochet Boys from Santiago de Chile, Niños Con Bombas from Hamburg and Polvorosa from Barcelona, where he currently lives.

== Biography ==
=== Education and career ===
Daniel Puente Encina began teaching himself music at the age of four. On his twelfth birthday, he father gave him a guitar and an hour's lesson. As an adolescent, he studied Musicology and Sociology at the University of Chile.

=== Los Pinochet Boys (1984–1987) ===
In his native Chile, he is better known as "Daniel Puente" o "Dani Puente", founder, lead singer and bass player of the anti-fascist new wave/post-punk group Pinochet Boys formed with a few friends in the Santiago of the mid-1980s, one of the most repressive periods of Augusto Pinochet's dictatorship. His first group, it formed part of the Chilean revolution, as noted in a number of books, documentaries and the fourth episode of Chilean drama TV series Los 80 by Canal 13. In 1984, Carlos Fonseca, a friend of the group and presenter of the programme Fusión contemporánea on Santiago's Radio Beethoven station, offered them a contract with the record company Fusión, owned by his father Mario Fonseca, on the condition that they changed its provocative name –something the group refused to do. The contract was later offered to group Los Prisioneros. Los Pinochet Boys' clandestine concerts were routinely broken up by the police shortly after they began, soon sparking to a youth movement in the Chilean capital. Its four members were harassed, threatened and persecuted for their irreverent attitude and wild performances, and often arrested for having dyed hair. In 1987, after only three years together, Los Pinochet Boys were unofficially forced by the military regime to leave the country. After almost two years of organizing their own concerts and touring with, amongst others, the Inocentes and Plebe Rude in Brazil and Todos Tus Muertos in Argentina, the group returned to Chile to play an active role in the No campaign for the 1988 Chilean national plebiscite, which put an end to Pinochet's regime. Their sole musical legacy consisted of two cassette recordings: "Botellas contra el pavimento"/"En mi tiempo libre" and "La música del general"/"Esto es Pinochet Boys", which have been copied on numerous occasions over the past decades. In 2012, record company Hueso Records from New York remastered both to produce a 500-copy limited edition 7-inch record entitled Pinochet Boys.

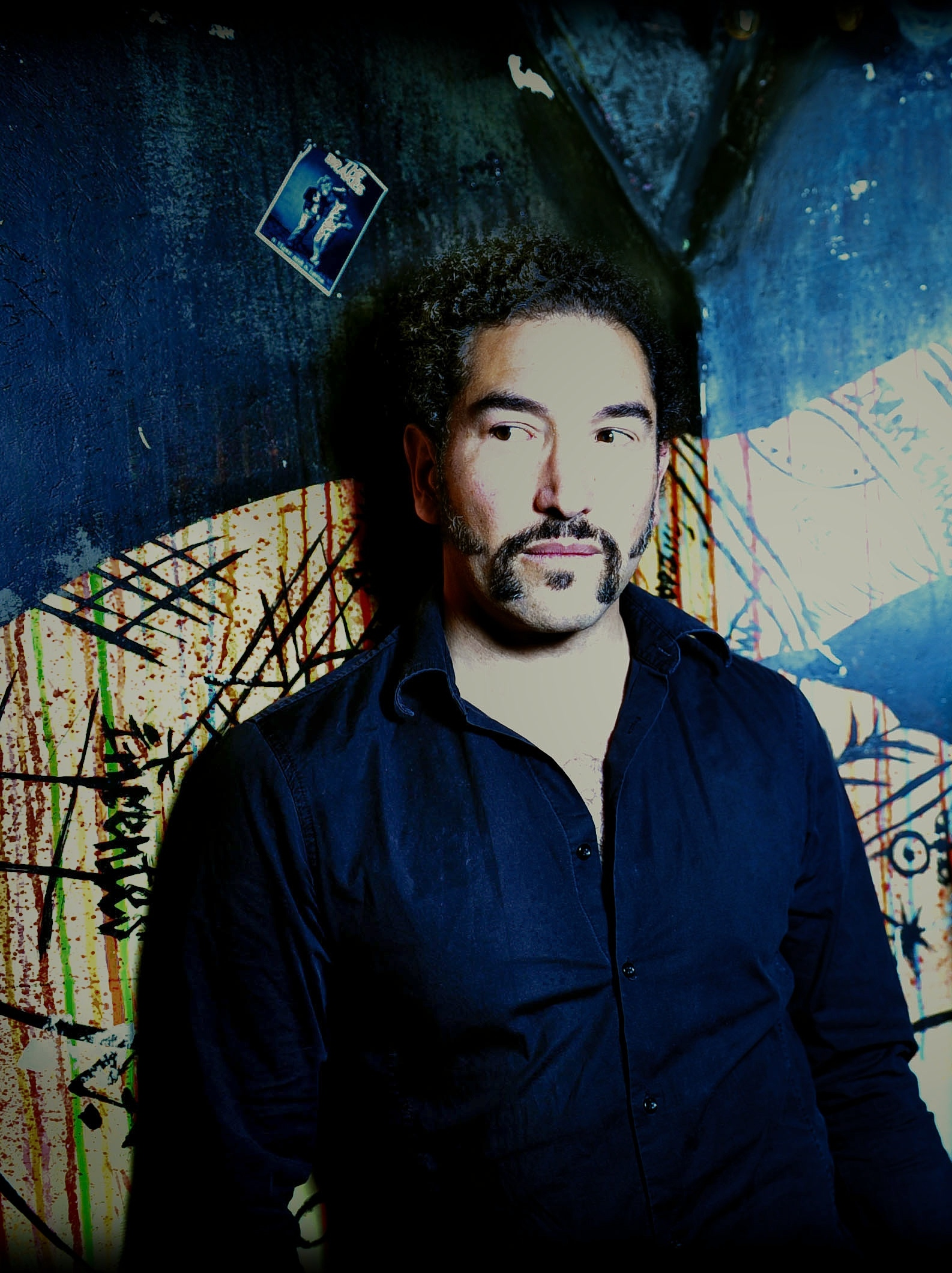
Daniel Puente Encina Berlin (2013). Photo: Roger Askew

=== Niños Con Bombas (1994–1999) ===
In 1989, after traveling through Europe, "Daniel Puente" moved to West Berlin a few months before fall of the Wall. There, he became friends with members of Einstürzende Neubauten, who would later on play an important role introducing him to a wider audience. After the fall of the Berlin Wall, Puente Encina settled in Hamburg, where he founded the multicultural group Niños Con Bombas, sharing the stage with a number of bands from the so-called Hamburger Schule indie scene, such as Tocotronic, Blumfeld and Die Goldenen Zitronen. In 1995, Niños Con Bombas won the "John Lennon Talent Award" and signed deals with Stuttgart label Intercord, Potomak and New York-based international alternative Latin record company Grita! Records, founded by Bad Religion's original drummer Jay Ziskrout. The band released two albums: Niños Con Bombas de tiempo en el momento de la explosión (1996) produced by Chris Rolffsen and El Niño (1997) produced by Thies Mynther. Due to the MTV Music Television Video Rotation and radio airplays, songs such as Skreamska and Postcard were popular in Europe, South America and the US, which the group toured in 1997, with concerts in New Jersey, Boston, Philadelphia, Washington, Virginia, New York, Los Angeles and San Francisco. In 1998, they played in front of a crowd of 90,000 at the Rock al Parque festival in Bogotá, Colombia and, in 1999, at Austin's South by Southwest (SXSW) Music Festival, with The New York Times saying "one of the most interesting performances was that of Niños Con Bombas". In South America, Puente Encina and his group toured countries such as Chile, Argentina, Mexico, Brazil and Colombia and performed its alternative Latin Jazz-Ska-Rock sound in Europe as openers for Einstürzende Neubauten. In 1999, Niños Con Bombas moved to Los Angeles, but due to internal differences split shortly afterwards.

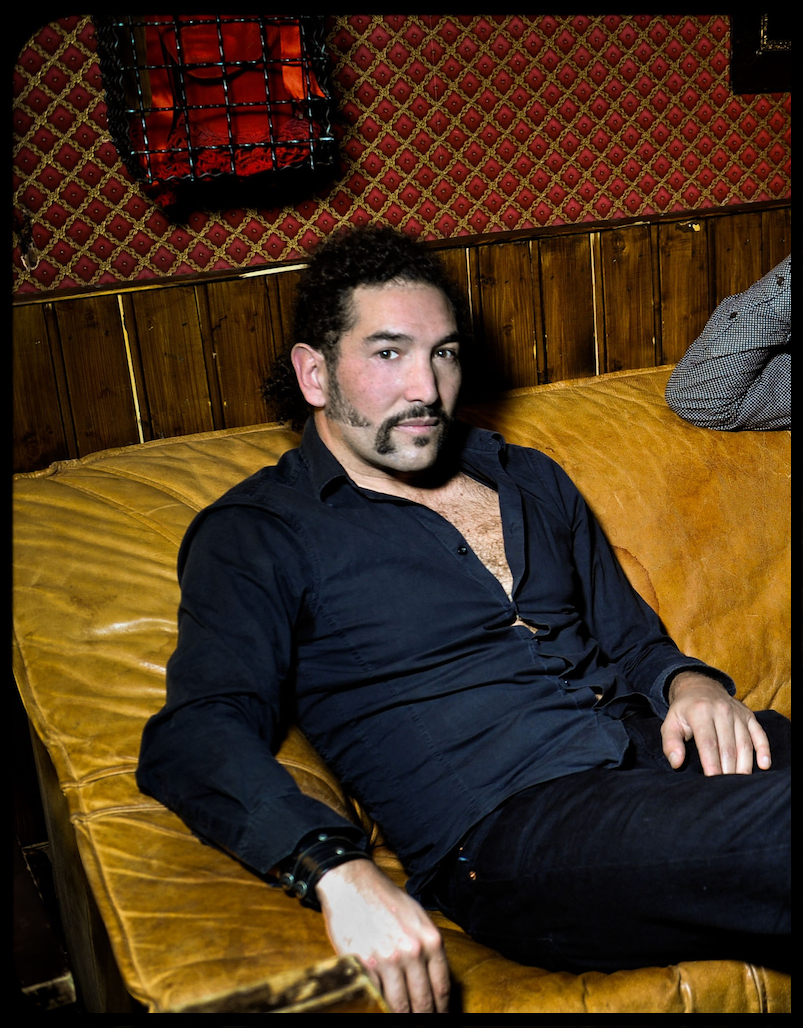
Daniel Puente Encina, backstage White Trash Club, Berlin (2013). Photo: Roger Askew

=== Polvorosa (2000–2011) ===
In 2000, Puente Encina moved back to Europe and began performing and producing under the name "Polvorosa" in Barcelona, Spain. Once again changing musical direction, he created a new style: "Latin-Elektro-Clash". "Polvorosa" toured Europe and, as openers for Chambao and Ojos de Brujo, the entire Iberian peninsula. In 2004, he released the album Radical Car Dance. The track Behind de mi House became known worldwide after its video, created by German film director Marten Persiel, was chosen by MTV Music Television for its 2004 DVD compendium "Los Vídeos Mas Espectaculares" ("The Most Spectacular Videos"). In 2009, Puente Encina abandoned electronica in favor of a more natural feel and more organic sound. The end result was a mix of Latin, desert rock, jazz and world music. In 2011, he was chosen by Spanish nonprofit organization Instituto Cervantes in Tel Aviv to give a number of concerts in Israel.

=== Solo career ===
In 2012, Daniel Puente Encina recorded his first album under his own name: Disparo, a blues-based work noteworthy for the minimalism of its instrumentation. Its ten tracks included an updated version of "Botellas contra el pavimento" by way of a personal tribute to his first band, "Pinochet Boys". The album was released in spring 2012 and launched in his native Chile, with a subsequent tour of Spain, Germany and Denmark. In 2013, before continuing with his German tour, with the support of Catalan governmental organization Institut Ramon Llull, he invited New York soul singer Mónica Green, granddaughter of Margaret "Maggie" Price of The-Cabineers, to the studio to take part in the recording of new versions of Lío and Mike Tysonboth songs from this album, to give the chorus a touch of Motown.

July 2014 saw Puente Encina release Chocolate con Ají (Chocolate with Chilli), the second album under his own name, containing a mixture of genres and described on his website as a personal "Best Of" album, a compilation of his favorite previously unreleased compositions. It reflects a wide variety of styles ranging from South American music, rhythm and blues and Caribbean sounds. He promoted the album in Denmark, during the Copenhagen Jazz Festival, in Germany and Italy and began another European tour in 2015. Puente Encina was invited by the Cuban Music Institute's National Centre for Popular Music to give four performances at the 31st "Jazz Plaza" Havana International Jazz Festival in December 2015.

In 2016, for the International Workers' Day, he published "Freire", an animated music video created by Chilean illustrator and director Cristián Montes Lynch and his team. With the song from his album Chocolate con Ají and its corresponding video clip, Daniel Puente Encina reflects his critical view of "the unjust, dysfunctional system that is capitalism" and draws attention to the exploitation of mining workers throughout the Andes.

In 2017 he invited Majorcan organist and pianist Llorenç Barceló to record a piano version of his smooth-jazz classic Odd Desire.

Sangre y Sal (Blood and Salt), his third solo album, published in 2019, was inspired by the mark left by Africa on the criolla music of Chile, Peru and Argentina. In 2019 Daniel Puente Encina was awarded with The Lukas, (Latin UK Awards), Runner-up in the category European Jazz/ Folk Act of the year.

=== Style and influences ===
Daniel Puente Encina has created—and recreated—a number of different styles of music. With Los Pinochet Boys, he offered a mix of new wave and post-punk. With Niños Con Bombas, he fused Latin, jazz, ska and rock with punk elements. In 2004, under the name Polvorosa, he invented a new style he dubbed "Latin-Elektro-Clash". 2012's Disparo is a minimalist, blues-based album fusing R&B, Son cubano, Reggae and Bolero elements with African and Afro-Peruvian rhythms. His 2014 album Chocolate con Ají mixes South American musical influences, rhythm and blues and Caribbean music, providing a listening experience embracing everything from boogaloo blues, 60s Latin soul, samba funk and Latin rap to Dixie country ska, slow swing and indie-Cuban ballads. According to his website, he calls such creations "Furious Latin Soul", "Dirty Boogaloo", "Rebel Tango", "Flamenco Tex-Mex" and "Dixie Country Ska". Sangre y Sal (2019) stands out for its organic mixture. with Afro-Peruvian rhythms with dashes of Flamenco, Peruvian waltz, Argentinian Zamba, Guaguancó, Cueca, Latin Swing and Boleros. The album is considered as a tribute to Latin American music "inspired by the mark that Africa has left on the Creole music of Peru, Argentina and of course Chile, his country of origin."

Although he mainly sings in Spanish, Puente Encina occasionally uses a mix of different languages in his lyrics. With Niños Con Bombas, he wrote songs such as Ton Ego n'est pas toi, sung partly in French. With Polvorosa, he sang in Portuñol, a mix of Portuguese and Spanish, in English and Spanish alone, and also in Spanglish, the mix of the latter two languages used mainly by the Latino community in the US.

He plays a variety of guitars when performing, frequently swapping between his Dobro, resonator, 1962 Höfner electric and Camps classical guitars. Since 2018 Daniel Puente Encina belongs to the official artist roster of Canadian Godin (guitar manufacturer) in Germany and plays a Godin Multiac Grand Concert Duet Ambiance guitar, a hybrid between electric guitar and acoustic guitar.

=== Film and TV ===
In the 1990s, Niños Con Bombas caught the eye of Turkish-German film director Fatih Akin, who contacted Daniel Puente Encina, marking the start of long working relationship. Puente Encina's songs Cocomoon and Nunca Diré formed part of the soundtrack of the Akin's first feature, 1998's crime film Short Sharp Shock. Puente Encina also composed songs such as El Amor se demora and Ramona for the director's road movie In July (2000), in which he had a cameo role with Niños Con Bombas, singing the song Velocidad. He also wrote the song Not here for the multi-award-winning drama film Head On (2004).

In 2012, Daniel Puente Encina was interviewed during his Chilean tour by Joe Vasconcellos for El baile de los que sobran, a documentary on singer Jorge González, as well as by Alfredo Lewin for the Via X TV programme Red Hot Chilean People, for which he also performed five songs live. Lewin was a famous MTV video jockey and had previously interviewed Puente Encina in the 90s for MTV Latin America in Miami.

In April 2015, Daniel Puente Encina played a supporting role as "Sadler", P.E.N. congress visitor in Buenos Aires, in Maria Schrader's film Stefan Zweig: Farewell to Europe, awarded by the European Film Awards ("People’s Choice Award for Best European Film" for Maria Schrader), Bavarian Film Awards (Maria Schrader as Best Director), German Film Critics Award (Josef Hader as Best Actor), German Film Critics Award (Wolfgang Thaler as Best Cinematography) and the Austrian Film Award (Monika Fischer-Vorauer and Andreas Meixner for Best Make Up) in 2017. In 2016 the narrative film was nominated for the Deutscher Filmpreis (German Film Awards, also called Lola Awards) in two categories: Maria Schrader for Best Director and Barbara Sukowa for Best Supporting Actress and Maria Schrader for the Variety Piazza Grande Award by the Locarno International Film Festival. In 2017 the movie was nominated by the European Film Awards (Josef Hader as Best European Actor), Austrian Film Award (Josef Hader as Best Actor), Palm Springs International Film Festival (FIPRESCI Prize for Maria Schrader as Best Foreign Language Film), German Film Critics Award (Maria Schrader for Best Film, Maria Schrader and Jan Schomburg for Best Screenplay, Aenne Schwarz as Best Actress) and by the Jupiter Award (Josef Hader as Best German Actor).

== Discography ==
=== Pinochet Boys ===
- 2012 – Pinochet Boys, 7" Vinyl, recorded 1984

=== Niños Con Bombas ===
- 1996 – Niños Con Bombas de tiempo en el momento de la explosión (Album)
- 1997 – El Niño (Album)
- 1998 – Short Sharp Shock, crime film by Fatih Akin, (Songs "Cocomoon" and "Nunca Diré": Original Soundtrack)
- 1998 – Skaliente (compilation)
- 1998 – Rolling Stone New Voices, Vol. 21 (compilation)
- 1999 – Elektro Latino Vol.1 (compilation)
- 2000 – Im Juli (English: In July) road movie by Fatih Akin, (Song "Ramona": Original Soundtrack / Cameo: "Velocidad" live)
- 2004 – Head-On, German: "Gegen die Wand", multi-award-winning drama film by Fatih Akin (Songs "Postcard" and "Cocomoon": Original Soundtrack)

=== Polvorosa ===
- 2000 – "Popkomm Sampler" (compilation)
- 2000 – Im Juli (English: In July) road movie by Fatih Akin, (Song "El amor se demora": Original Soundtrack)
- 2004 – Head-On, German: "Gegen die Wand", multi-award-winning drama film by Fatih Akin (Song "Not here": Original Soundtrack)
- 2004 – Radical Car Dance (Album)
- 2004 – "Electronic Latin Freaks" (compilation)
- 2004 – "Barcelona Raval Sessions" (compilation)
- 2006 – "Sex, City, Music: Barcelona" (compilation)

=== Solo albums ===
- 2012 – Disparo (Shot), (Album)
- 2014 – Chocolate con Ají (Chocolate with Chili), (Album)
- 2019 – Sangre y sal (Blood and salt), (Album)

=== Singles ===
- 2013 – Mike Tyson Radio Mix (with Monica Green)
- 2013 – Lío Radio Mix (with Monica Green)
- 2016 – Freire (video clip created by Chilean illustrator Cristián Montes Lynch)
- 2017 – Odd Desire Piano Version (with Majorcan pianist Llorenç Barceló)
- 2019 – Love is the only sound
- 2019 – Frente al mar
- 2019 – Bipolar
- 2019 – Falta de ti

== Selected filmography ==
- 1998 – Short Sharp Shock, crime film by Fatih Akin, (Songs "Cocomoon" and "Nunca Diré": Original Soundtrack). Film score composer
- 2000 – Im Juli (English: In July). Cameo appearance with Niños Con Bombas playing "Velocidad" live in Fatih Akin's road movie. (Songs "El amor se demora" and "Ramona": Original Soundtrack). Film score composer.
- 2004 – Head-On, German: "Gegen die Wand", multi-award-winning drama film by Fatih Akin (Songs "Not here", "Postcard" and "Cocomoon": Original Soundtrack). Film score composer
- 2015 – Stefan Zweig: Farewell to Europe internationally co-produced drama film by Maria Schrader. Supporting actor as the congress visitor "Sadler".

== Documentary film ==
- 2012 – "El baile de los que sobran". Music documentary film about Jorge González. Chile, TV-Serie: Doremix with Joe Vasconcellos, Screenplay: Cristián Freund, Fernando Fuentes, Rodrigo Sepúlveda, Directed by Werner Giesen, Rodrigo Sepúlveda, Produced by: CNTV, Zoofilms, first broadcast: September 9, 2012, by TVN, TV Chile

== Awards and nominations ==
Awards

- 1995: John Lennon Talent Award for Niños Con Bombas
- 2004 MTV Spain "The most spectacular videos 2004", Song "Behind de mi House" by Polvorosa. Artdesign Marten Persiel
- 2019 The Lukas, Runner-up in the category "European Jazz/Folk Act of the Year"
