= Adam Bousdoukos =

German actor

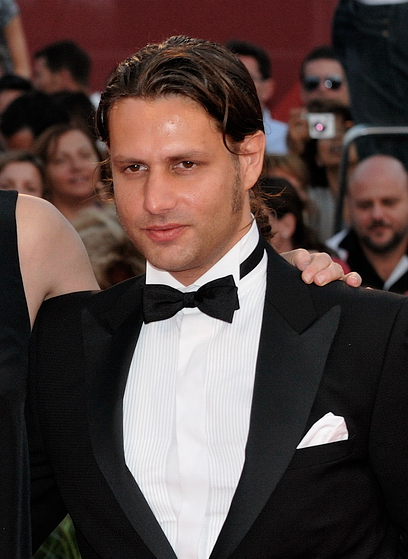
- Born: 25 January 1974 (age 52); Hamburg, West Germany
- Occupation: Actor
- Years active: 1995–present

Adam Bousdoukos (Greek: Αδάμ Μπουσδούκος; born 25 January 1974) is a German actor of Greek origin. He has appeared in more than 50 films since 1995.

== Life ==
Growing up as the son of Greek parents in the Hamburg district of Altona, Bousdoukos played smaller roles in commercials as a teenager and later took classes at the Stage School Hamburg.

In 1998, Bousdoukos had a role in Fatih Akin's Short Sharp Shock and, together with the other two leading actors Mehmet Kurtuluş and Aleksandar Jovanovic, received the Leopard award at the Locarno Festival in 1998 and the Grimme-Preis in 2001. With the exception of Getürkt, Bousdoukos can be seen in every film by his friend Akın, including Soul Kitchen (2009), where he had the leading role and wrote the script. The cinematic collaboration with Akin began in 1995 with the short film Sensin – Du bist es!.

In addition, Bousdoukos appeared in a number of other movie and TV roles. He also ran the "Sotiris" restaurant in the Ottensen district of Hamburg for almost ten years.

== Charity work ==
Adam Bousdoukos with friends has been supporting the Soul Kids association since 2009. The organization raises funds through various events and activities, which are donated to selected non-profit associations, institutions and projects.

== Selected filmography ==
- 1995: Sensin – Du bist es! (short)
- 1998: Short Sharp Shock
- 2000: In July
- 2000: Die Pfefferkörner
- 2002: Solino
- 2003: Adelheid und ihre Mörder (Episode: Millionenpuzzle)
- 2004: Kebab Connection
- 2004: Head-On
- 2009: Soul Kitchen
- 2011: Chalet Girl
- 2011–2019: Großstadtrevier (TV series, 2 episodes)
- 2012: Life Is Not for Cowards
- 2012: Leipzig Homicide (TV series, 1 episode)
- 2013: Stuttgart Homicide (TV series, 1 episode)
- 2014: Der letzte Bulle (TV series, 7 episodes)
- 2014: The Cut
- 2014–2015: Lindenstraße (TV series, 11 episodes)
- 2015: Tetarti 04:45
- 2015: Highway to Hellas
- 2019: The Golden Glove
- 2019: SOKO Hamburg (TV series, episode Der Lottokönig)
- 2022: Skin Deep (Aus meiner Haut)
