= Greeks in Germany =

- Distribution of Greek nationals in Germany

Total population
- 2016, Greek Ethnic Origin 443,000; 2016, Greek Citizens 348,475; 2016, Born in Greece 274,060; 2016, Born in Germany 74,415

Regions with significant populations
- Berlin, Frankfurt Rhine Main Region, Munich, Stuttgart, Düsseldorf, Bielefeld

Languages
- Greek and German

Religion
- Predominantly Greek Orthodox Church, Atheism, some Islam (Greek Muslims)

Related ethnic groups
- Greek diaspora

The Greeks in Germany (Greek: Έλληνες στη Γερμανία, romanized: Éllines sti Germanía; German: Griechen in Deutschland) comprise German residents or citizens of Greek heritage and Greeks who immigrated to Germany. According to the Federal Statistical Office of Germany, 453,000 people living in Germany in 2019 had full or partial Greek ancestry. 363,650 of these were Greek citizens (including those with dual citizenship).

== History ==
Significant immigration from Greece to Germany started around 1700, when the Ottoman Empire opened its borders. The first community was found in Leipzig at this time.

A second wave of immigration occurred in and after 1832 when Otto von Wittelsbach (1815—1867) became King of Greece as Otto of Greece. Many Greeks came as students to Bavaria.

The last major wave took place following World War II, most Greeks arriving during this time. In those post-war years, West Germany sought workers for their expanding industries, while East Germany provided safe haven for Greek communists.

Many Greek children were involuntarily relocated to the German Democratic Republic by the Communist rebels during the Greek Civil War.

== Education ==
The first Greek schools were created because of the number of Greeks immigrating to Germany. Since the first Greek school built in 1960 and up until 1990, over 1 million Greeks had immigrated to Germany. About 800,000 of those Greeks had after either a long-term or a short term stay gone back to Greece. Nowadays, every fifth of an estimated 47,000 students of Greek origin attends one of 35 Greek schools in Germany.

== Demographics ==
The first Greeks came during the time of the Roman Empire to Central Europe. Among the major German cities Offenbach am Main and Stuttgart had the highest share of Greek migrants in 2011 according to German Census data. Munich was home to the largest Greek community in Germany. According to the same census, there are also large Greek diaspora communities in Nordrhein-Westfalen, especially in Düsseldorf and Bielefeld.

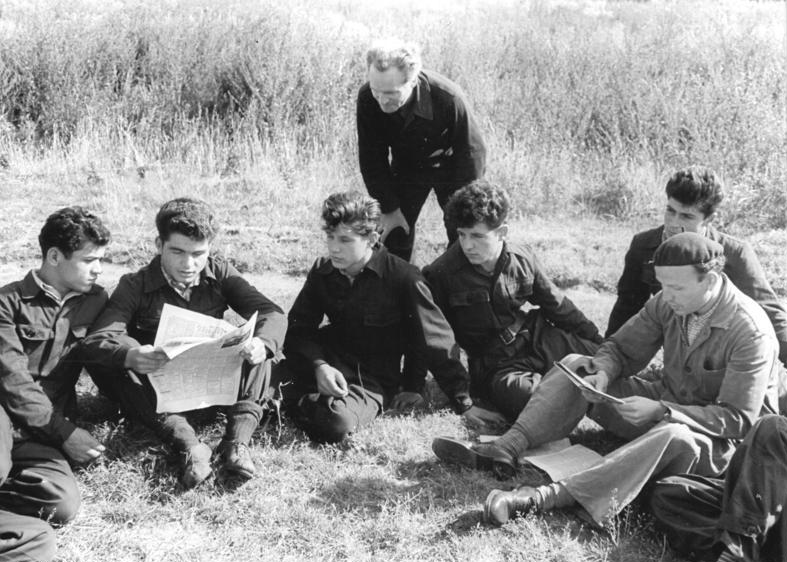
Early Greek workers in Germany, in 1956

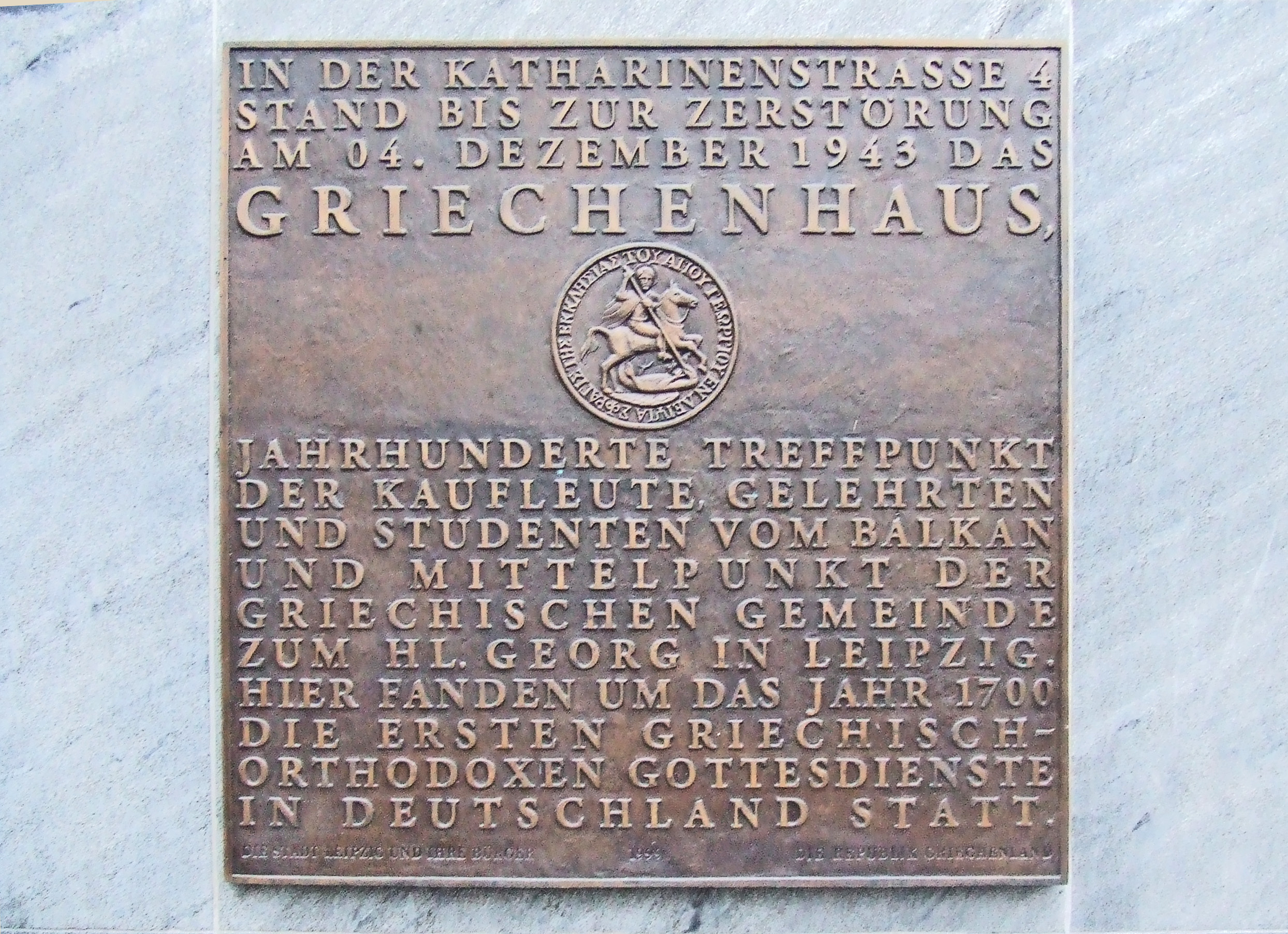
The place where the Griechenhaus stood, a court of Greek merchants in Leipzig

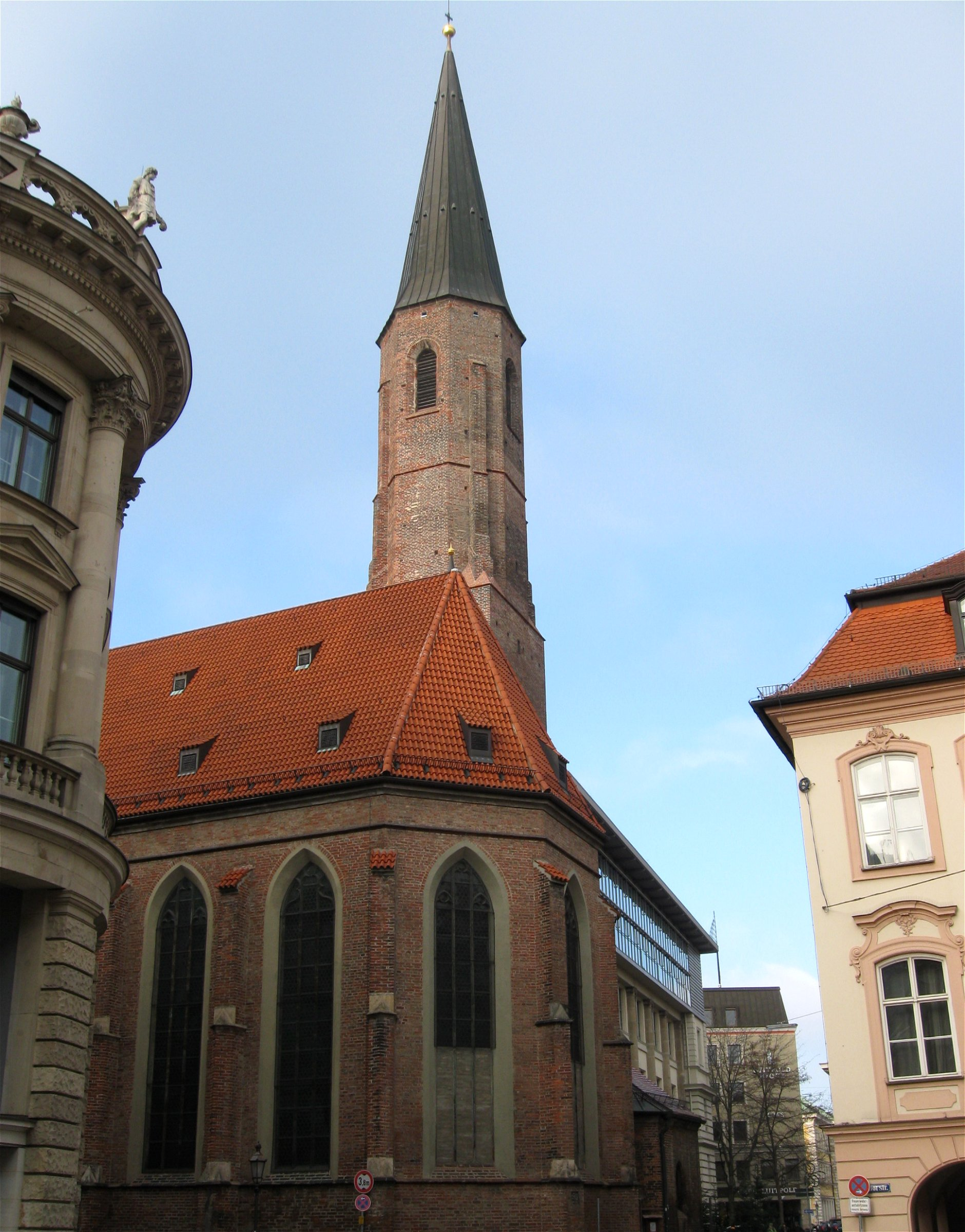
The Greek Salvator church in Munich

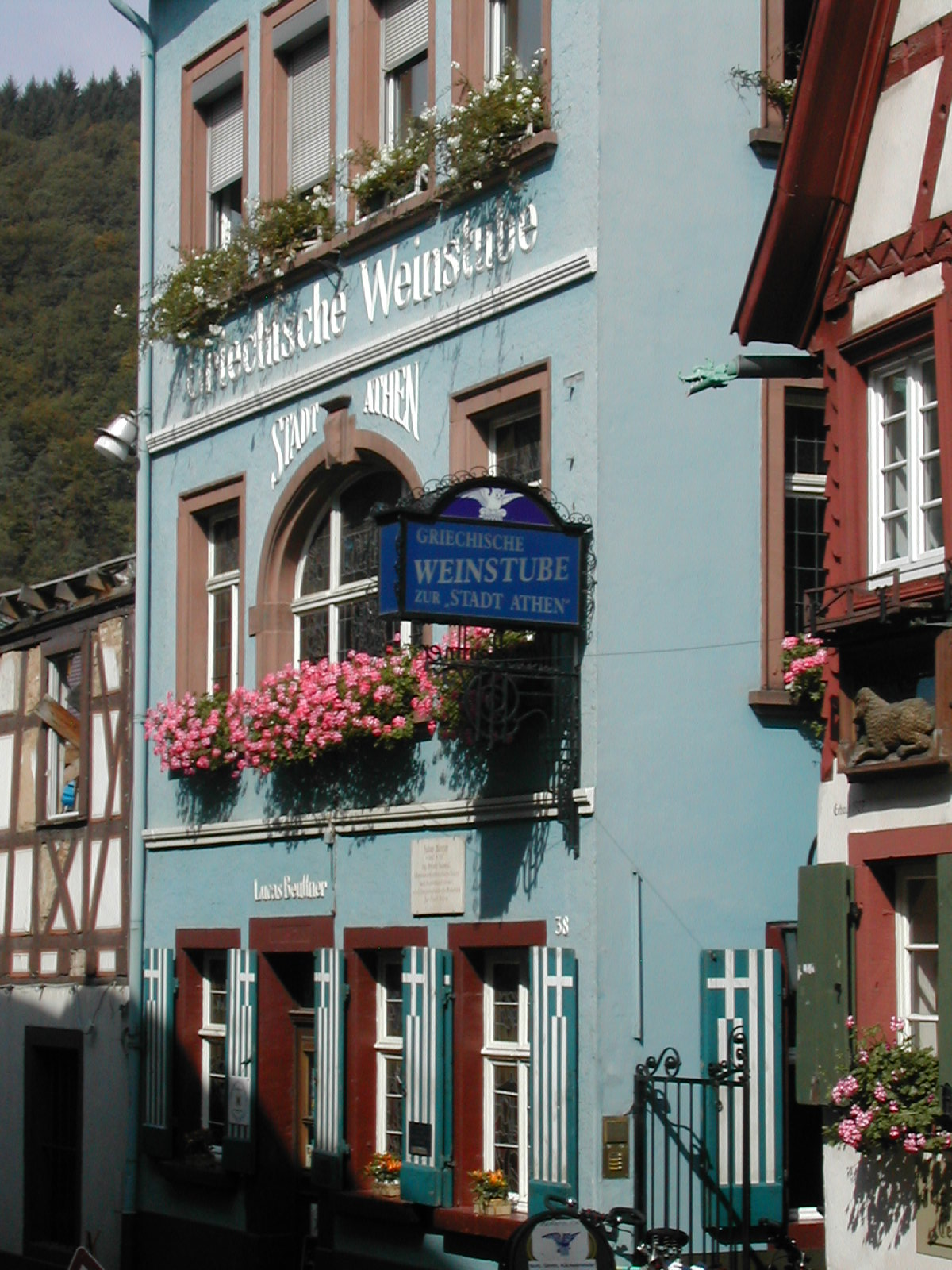
This Greek tavern, located in Neckargemuend near Heidelberg, was founded in 1882.

Number of Greeks in larger cities
#	City	People
1.	Munich	26,613
2.	Berlin	14,625
3.	Stuttgart	13,757
4.	Nuremberg	12,145
5.	Düsseldorf	10,388
6.	Frankfurt	6,381
7.	Wuppertal	6,130
8.	Hamburg	6,095
9.	Cologne	5,841
10.	Offenbach	5,230
11.	Hanover	4,763
12.	Dortmund	4,132
13.	Bielefeld	3,765
14.	Mannheim	3,341
15.	Essen	3,000
16.	Wiesbaden	2,774
17.	Duisburg	2,381
18.	Augsburg	2,219
19.	Ludwigshafen	2,086
20.	Krefeld	1,942

Greeks in Germany by Nationality
Year	Pop.	±%
1967	200,951	—
1972	389,426	+93.8%
1977	328,465	−15.7%
1982	300,824	−8.4%
1987	256,396	−14.8%
1992	345,902	+34.9%
1997	363,202	+5.0%
2002	359,361	−1.1%
2007	294,891	−17.9%
2012	298,254	+1.1%
2017	362,245	+21.5%

=== Muslims from Greece ===
There are some members of the Turks of Western Thrace who espouse a Turcophone identity including Turks of the Dodecanese among the some 350,000 Greeks living in Germany. The majority of them immigrated from Western Thrace. In the 1960s and 1970s, the Thracian tobacco industry was affected by a severe crisis and many tobacco growers lost their income. This resulted in many Muslims leaving their homes and emigrating abroad, with estimates suggesting that there are now between 12,000 and 25,000 residing in Germany.

== Notable people ==
- Theophano (960-991) - Empress of Holy Roman Empire, Wife of Otto II.
- John Argyris (1913-2004) - was among the creators of the Finite Element Method (FEM)
- Daniela Amavia - actress and model
- Adam Bousdoukos- from Soul Kitchen
- Constantin Carathéodory - mathematician
- Miltiades Caridis - conductor
- Costa Cordalis - singer/songwriter
- Georgios Donis - footballer
- Margaritis Dimitsas (1830-1903) - geographer
- Artemis Gounaki - singer/songwriter
- Nicolaus Handjery (1836-1900) - conservative politician, member of the Reichstag of the German Empire
- LaFee - singer/songwriter
- Georg Anton Jasmatzi (1847-1922) - founder of the Jasmatzi tabac factory (later sold to British American Tobacco)
- Aris Kalaizis - painter
- Panajotis Kondylis (1943-1998) - philosopher
- Jonas Kyratzes - video game designer
- Vicky Leandros - singer
- Pierre Mavrogordatos (1870-1948) - archaeologist
- Ioannis Masmanidis - footballer
- Kostantinos Mitroglou - footballer
- Argyris Nastópoulos - singer
- Demis Nikolaidis - footballer
- Antonis Remos - singer
- Susan Sideropoulos- singer and actress
- Despina Vandi - singer
- Melina Aslanidou - singer
- Andromache Dimitropoulou - singer
- Anastasia Zampounidis - broadcaster
- Antonios Papadopoulos - footballer
- Linda Zervakis - newscaster (Tagesschau)
- Haris & Panos Katsimihas - singers, songwriters, composers
- Odisseas Vlachodimos - footballer
- Panagiotis Vlachodimos - footballer
- Shindy - rapper
- Ioannis Panousis - Author, Law Enforcement Specialist
- Evan K
- Joseph Pilates Inventor of the Pilates method of physical fitness.

== See also ==
- Germany–Greece relations
- Greek diaspora
- Immigration to Germany
- Greek Orthodox Metropolis of Germany

== Bibliography ==
- Clogg, Richard (2002). Minorities in Greece: Aspects of a Plural Society. C. Hurst & Co. Publishers. ISBN 1-85065-705-X..
- Council of Europe: Parliamentary Assembly (2007). Parliamentary Assembly: Working Papers 2007 Ordinary Session 22–26 January 2007. Council of Europe. ISBN 978-92-871-6191-8..
- Westerlund, David; Svanberg, Ingvar (1999). Islam Outside the Arab World. Palgrave Macmillan. ISBN 0-312-22691-8..
