= Winsley (disambiguation) =

Winsley is a large village and civil parish in Wiltshire, England.

Winsley may also refer to:

- Winsley Mines, biological site of special scientific interest, near Winsley, England
- Lady Winsley, 2019 French–Turkish–Belgian black comedy mystery film
- Shirley Winsley (born 1934), American politician
- Wayne Winsley (born 1963), American motivational speaker, author, and broadcaster
- Winsley Boteli (born 2006), Swiss footballer
