= Tim Seyfi =

Turkish-German actor (born 1971)

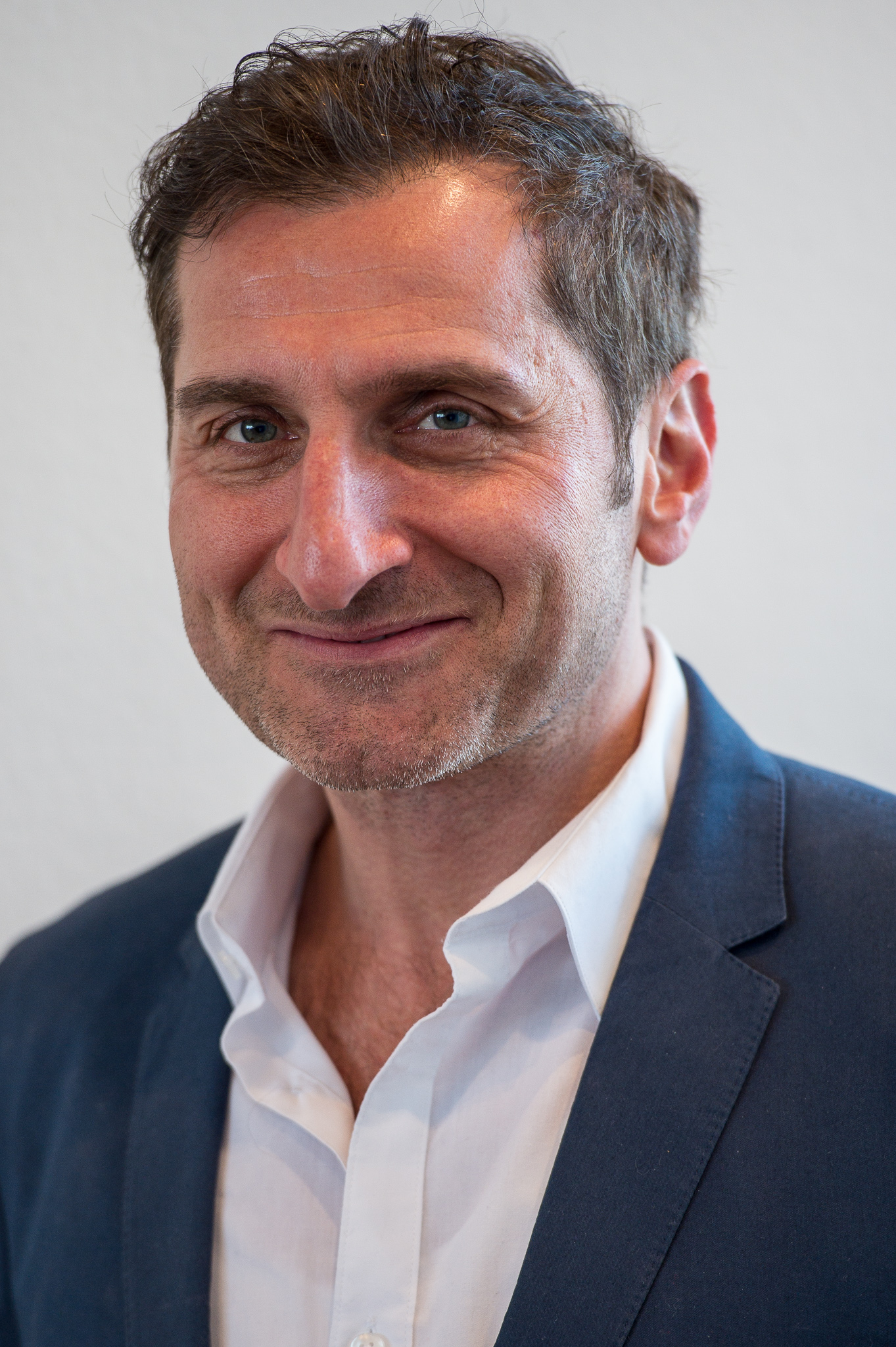
- Tim Seyfi in 2017
- Born: Timur Seyfettin Ölmez; 10 August 1971 (age 55); Yıldızeli, Turkey
- Years active: 1996–present
- Website: http://www.timseyfi.com/

Timur Seyfettin Ölmez (born 10 August 1971) better known as Tim Seyfi, is a Turkish-German actor. In 2017 he played his first leading role as Commissioner Pascha in a TV series of the same name.

== Filmography ==
=== Film ===
Year	Title	Role	Notes
1997	Magic Bus	Italian Singer	
1999	Weites Meer	Cem	
1999	The Cookie Thief	Turkish man	Credited as Seyfi Ölmez
2000	Ein ganz normaler Tag	Luigi	
2000	Der Kanacke	Der Türke	
2001	Birth:day	Louis	
2001	Floor 29	Alec Petrovic	
2001	Gott ist ein toter Fisch		
2001	Das Sams	Angestellter	Credited as Seyfi Ölmez
2003	Die Windsbraut	Barber	
2003	In Search of an Impotent Man	Lorenzo	Credited as Seyfi Ölmez
2003	God Is No Soprano	Moishe	
2003	Glücksstadt	Dominick Galliano	
2003	Der Typ		
2004	Head-On	Bayerischer Taxifahrer	
2004	Soundless		
2004	C(r)ook	Italiener	
2004	Meine Frau, meine Freunde und ich	Franco	
2006	Grave Decisions	Kaffl	
2006	Fay Grim	Rabbi Todorov	
2006	2 süper film birden	Necati	
2007	Die Handwerker Gottes	Buffalmaco	
2008	Na lepom plavom Dunavu	Boss from nowhere	
2008	Aşk tutulması	Burçaslan	
2008	Evet, I Do!	Coşkun	
2009	Vasha	Globe	
2009	Germany 09: 13 Short Films About the State of the Nation	Fraktur	
2014	Geronimo	Tarik	
2016	Çakallarla D4ns	Şerafettin	
2017	Bye Bye Germany		
2018	Les Bonnes Intentions	Adjin	
2021	Necista krv: Greh predaka	Dzafer Beg	
2023	Operation Fortune: Ruse de Guerre	Alexander	
2025	Our Girls	Ahmed Özdemir	

=== Television ===
Year	Title	Role	Notes
1996	Willkommen in Kronstadt	Ali	
1998	Supersingle		
2000	Schöne Aussichten	Murat	Credited as Seyfi Ölmez
2000	Wolffs Revier	Hakan Badawi	1 episode
2000	No More Men	Ansager beim Tanzwettbewerb	Credited as Seyfi Oelmez
2000	Force Majeure	Unteroffizier Wilmer	
2000–09	Tatort	Heinzi	6 episodes
2001	Du oder keine		
2001	Die Kumpel	Kernal	1 episode
2001	Herzstolpern	Wirt Luigi	
2001	Ein Sommertraum	Kemal	
2002	Drei Frauen, ein Plan und die ganz große Kohle	Attila	
2003	Alltag	Bingomann	
2004	Leipzig Homicide	Dr. Hakim Winterfeld	1 episode
2004	Schulmädchen	Moritz Wagner	1 episode
2005	Zeit der Wünsche	Kadir	
2005	Siska	Yenal	1 episode
2005	Balko	Achim Pohl	1 episode
2005–09	The Old Fox	Hehler	2 episodes
2006	Das total verrückte Wunderauto	Dixons Handlanger Plotz	
2006	Abschnitt 40	Abdullah Gürüncan	1 episode
2006	SOKO 5113	Josip Kandic	1 episode
2006	Ein Fall für den Fuchs		1 episode
2007	SOKO Rhein-Main	Yussuf Alemin	1 episode
2007	Eine folgenschwere Affäre	Sascha	
2008	Ten: Umbra Mortis	Fatih	
2008	Rennschwein Rudi Rüssel	Cem Koray	1 episode
2008	Zwillingsküsse schmecken besser	Hazım	
2011	Kung Fu Mama	Mario	
2013	Otisabi	Otis	Continued
2017	Commissioner Pascha	Commissioner Pascha	Continued
2019	The Spy	Mohammed bin Laden	2 episodes
2019–21	The Gift	Serdar	24 episodes

== Awards ==
In the 2001 International Film Festival (in Badalona) Seyfi won the Best actor award for the short 1999 film The Cookie Thief.
