= Gigi Savoia =

Italian actor

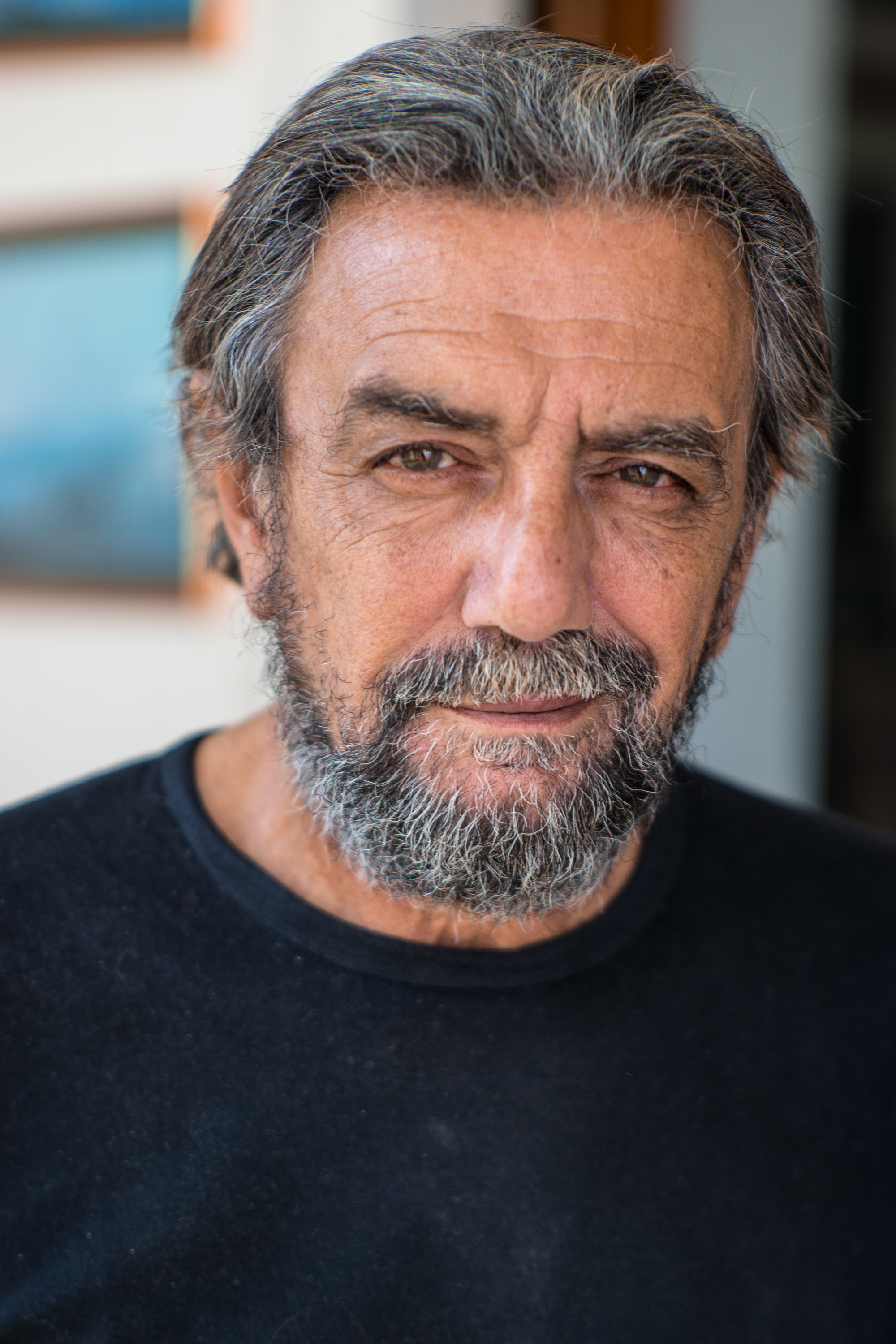
- Born: Luigi Savoia; 30 November 1954 (age 71); Naples, Italy
- Years active: 1980–present

Luigi "Gigi" Savoia (born 30 November 1954) is an Italian actor.

== Career ==
Savoia was born in Naples. He debuted in theatre in 1980 with Pescatori, written by Raffaele Viviani and directed by Mariano Rigillo. Currently he recites in Eduardo De Filippo's comedy Le voci di dentro directed by Francesco Rosi.

== Filmography ==
=== Film ===
- 1986 - Terno Secco - Directed by Giancarlo Giannini
- 1989 - Scugnizzi - Directed by Nanni Loy
- 1993 - Malesh - Directed by Angelo Cannavacciuolo
- 1993 - Pacco, doppio pacco e contropaccotto - Directed by Nanni Loy
- 1999 - Prima del tramonto - Directed by Stefano Incerti
- 2002 - Solino - Directed by Fatih Akin
- 2003 - Il mare, non c'è paragone - Directed by Eduardo Tartaglia
- 2019 - Rosa Pietra e Stella - Directed by Marcello Sannino

=== Theatre ===
- 1980 - Pescatori - Directed by Mariano Rigillo
- 1981 - L’arbitro - Directed by Mariano Rigillo
- 1981 - Ditegli sempre di sì - Directed by Eduardo De Filippo
- 1982 - Chi è cchiu' felice 'e me! - Directed by Eduardo De Filippo
- 1983 - Tre cazune fortunate - Directed by Eduardo De Filippo
- 1983 - Il turco napoletano - Directed by Eduardo De Filippo
- 1984 - La bisbetica - Directed by Giancarlo Sepe
- 1985 - O’ Scarfalietto - Directed by Armando Pugliese
- 1985 - Don Giovanni - Directed by Armando Pugliese
- 1986 - Non ti pago - Directed by Luca De Filippo
- 1988 - Svenimenti - Directed by Antonio Calenda
- 1989 - Flaiano-Silone-D’Annunzio - Directed by Giorgio Albertazzi
- 1990 - Memorie di Adriano - Directed by Maurizio Scaparro
- 1991 - Aida - Directed by Armando Pugliese
- 1992 - Questi fantasmi! - Directed by Luca De Filippo
- 1994 - Casa di frontiera - Directed by Gigi Proietti
- 1995 - Attori comici affittasi – Directed by Gigi Savoia
- 1995 - Na mugliera zitella – Directed by Gigi Savoia
- 1995 - Non mangiare il pollo con le dita – Directed by Gigi Savoia
- 1995 - Il monaco nel letto – Directed by Gigi Savoia
- 1996 - Morte di carnevale – Directed by Gigi Savoia
- 1996 - Pescatori – Directed by Gigi Savoia
- 1996 - Vico – Directed by Gigi Savoia
- 1997 - Toledo di notte – Directed by Gigi Savoia
- 1997 - Assunta Spina – Directed by Gigi Savoia
- 1997 - Napoli 1900 – Directed by Gigi Savoia
- 1997 - Don Giovanni – Directed by Franco Però
- 1997 - Il matrimonio di Figaro – Directed by Mico Galdieri
- 1998 - L’ultimo scugnizzo – Directed by Gigi Savoia
- 1999 - La Figliata – Directed by Gigi Savoia
- 1999 - Re Minore – Directed by Gigi Savoia
- 2000 - I casi sono due – Directed by Gigi Savoia
- 2003 - Vuoto di scena – Directed by Gigi Savoia
- 2003 - A’ Nanassa – Directed by Gigi Savoia
- 2003 - Ci sta un Francese, un Inglese e un Napoletano – Directed by Edoardo Tartaglia
- 2004 - Ridi Pagliaccio Ridi – Directed by Gigi Savoia
- 2004 - Amare Donne all’Infinito – Gigi Savoia
- 2005 - Comico Napoletano – Directed by Gigi Savoia
- 2005 - I veri fantasmi – Directed by Peppe Miale
- 2006 - L’ultimo scugnizzo – Directed by Gigi Savoia
- 2006 - L’ultimo giorno di un condannato a morte
- 2003/2006 - Napoli milionaria! – Directed by Francesco Rosi
- 2006/2008 - Le voci di dentro – Directed by Francesco Rosi
- 2022 - Il Muro di Napoli - Directed by Gigi Savoia

=== Television ===
- 1990 - Il Riscatto - Directed by Leon Ichaso
- 2001 - La Squadra
- 2001 - Incantesimo
- 2003 - Casafamiglia
- 2004 - Un posto al sole
- 2016 - La Famiglia - Television Hollanda
