= Die Liebenden vom Hotel von Osman =

2001 film directed by İdil Üner

- Directed by: İdil Üner
- Written by: Idil Üner
- Produced by: Tobias Büchner
- Starring: Fatih Akin; İdil Üner
- Cinematography: Bernd Meiners
- Edited by: Andrew Bird
- Release date: 2001
- Running time: 15 minutes
- Country: Germany
- Language: German

Die Liebenden vom Hotel von Osman is a 2001 German short film directed by İdil Üner. It stars Üner herself and Fatih Akın in the cast.
