= Birol Ünel =

Turkish-German actor (1961–2020)

- Born: 18 August 1961; Mersin, Turkey
- Died: 3 September 2020 (aged 59); Berlin, Germany
- Education: Musikhochschule Hannover
- Occupation: Actor
- Years active: 1988–2020
- Awards: Deutscher Filmpreis; Golden Bear

Birol Ünel (18 August 1961 – 3 September 2020) was a Turkish-German actor who played in German and Turkish films, television, and theatrical productions. He was perhaps best known for his role as the alcoholic Cahit Tomruk in Fatih Akin's 2004 drama film Head-On, for which he received the German film prize for Best Actor.

== Life and career ==
Ünel was born in Silifke, Mersin, in southern Turkey. In 1968, his family moved to Brinkum near Bremen in Germany. He studied acting at the Musikhochschule Hannover.

Ünel began as a theatre actor at the Berlin Tacheles where he played the lead and also directed the play Caligula. Ünel made his film debut in 1988's The Passenger. He played a private detective in the film Dealer which he followed up with a role in Fatih Akin's In July. He then portrayed the alcoholic Cahit Tomruk in Akin's Head-On (Gegen die Wand), which won the Golden Bear at the Berlinale 2004 and brought him international recognition. Ünel also won the German film prize for Best Actor for this performance.

In 2005 Ünel acted in the hit Turkish film Hırsız var!; his later films included Transylvania (2006), Seven Heroes and Soul Kitchen (2009). His career declined after struggles with alcohol and he was also in the news with minor criminal charges and homelessness.

Ünel died at a hospital in Berlin on 3 September 2020, aged 59, after suffering from cancer. He also suffered from alcoholism.
