= Zeit der Wünsche =

2005 film

- Directed by: Rolf Schübel
- Starring: Erhan Emre; Lale Yavaş
- Country of origin: Germany
- Original language: German

Production
- Running time: 3h 8min

Original release
- Release: 12 January 2005

Zeit der Wünsche is a 2005 two-part German television film directed by Rolf Schübel.

== Cast ==
- Erhan Emre - Mustafa
- Lale Yavaş - Melike
- Tim Seyfi - Kadir
- Hilmi Sözer - Yasar
- Neshe Demir - Mustafa's sister
- Katja Studt - Ursula
- İdil Üner - Hamife
- Dorka Gryllus - Esra
