= Barnaby Metschurat =

German actor

Barnaby Metschurat (born 22 September 1974, in West Berlin) is a German actor. He completed his training at the school Die Etage in Berlin. One of his first television roles was in 1993 as Kaspar Riedel in the German TV series Unser Lehrer Doktor Specht. He participates in cinema and television films and series.

In 2000 he played "Rosencrantz" in Peter Zadek's critically acclaimed production of Hamlet.

He won the Best New Actor category at the 2002 Bavarian Film Awards (Best Acting).

In the films L'Auberge espagnole (2002) and its sequel The Russian Dolls (2006), he played the role of the German, Tobias. He also starred in Solino (2002) and Anatomy 2 (2003). In 2016 he played the Nazi Joseph Goebbels in the Jesse Owens story Race. His most-recent appearance is in the 2021 crime drama "Ostfriesenangst."

In 2010 he made his debut as a director in the short film Sunny and Roswitha.

Barnaby lives in Berlin and has a son and a daughter.
