= Tekin Kurtuluş =

German actor of Turkish descent (born 1968)

- Born: September 16, 1968 (age 56); Salzgitter, Germany
- Occupation: Actor
- Years active: 1993 - present

Tekin Kurtulus (born 16 September 1968, Usak, Turkey) is a German actor of Turkish descent. He is the older brother of actor Mehmet Kurtuluş.

== Filmography ==
Year	Title	Role	Notes
2003	Lenßen & Partner	Tekin	
2008	Leipzig Homicide	Erdogan Cimsir	
