= Erhan Emre =

Turkish-German actor and director (born 1978)

- Born: Erhan Emre; 4 September 1978 (age 47); Kreuzberg, West Berlin, West Germany
- Years active: 1997–present

Erhan Emre (born 4 September 1978) is a Turkish–German actor, director, film producer and writer.

== Filmography ==
Film
| Year | Film | Role | Notes |
|---|---|---|---|
| 1997 | Brothers and Sisters | | |
| 1999 | Dealer | | |
| 2000 | Trust Me | Tuncay | |
| 2000 | Gran Paradiso | Rocky | |
| 2002 | Elephant Heart | Bülent | |
| 2003 | In Search of an Impotent Man | Wilko | |
| 2006 | Tough Enough | Hamal | |
| 2008 | Meine Mutter, mein Bruder und ich! | Areg | |

=== Television ===
| Year | Film | Role | Notes |
|---|---|---|---|
| 1999 | Einsatz Hamburg Süd | Mehmet Arbakan | 1 episode |
| 2003 | Club der Träume – Türkei, Marmaris | Mehmet | |
| 2003 | Alltag | Jabbar | |
| 2004 | Experiment Bootcamp | Rashid | |
| 2005 | Zeit der Wünsche | Mustafa | |
| 2006 | Burning Heart | Saladin | |
| 2002–06 | Tatort | Ahmet Turgut | 2 episodes |
| 2008 | Unschuldig | Dr. Sebastian Krüger | 12 episodes |

=== Director ===
| Year | Film | Notes |
|---|---|---|
| 2005 | Jack und Bob | Also the writer |

=== Producer ===
| Year | Film | Notes |
|---|---|---|
| 2003 | Urban Guerillas | |
| 2004 | Hinter der Tür | |
| 2006 | Liebe der Lieblosen | |

== Personal life ==
Emre was born to Kurdish immigrants in Germany, he is one of eight children.
