= İdil Üner =

German-Turkish actress

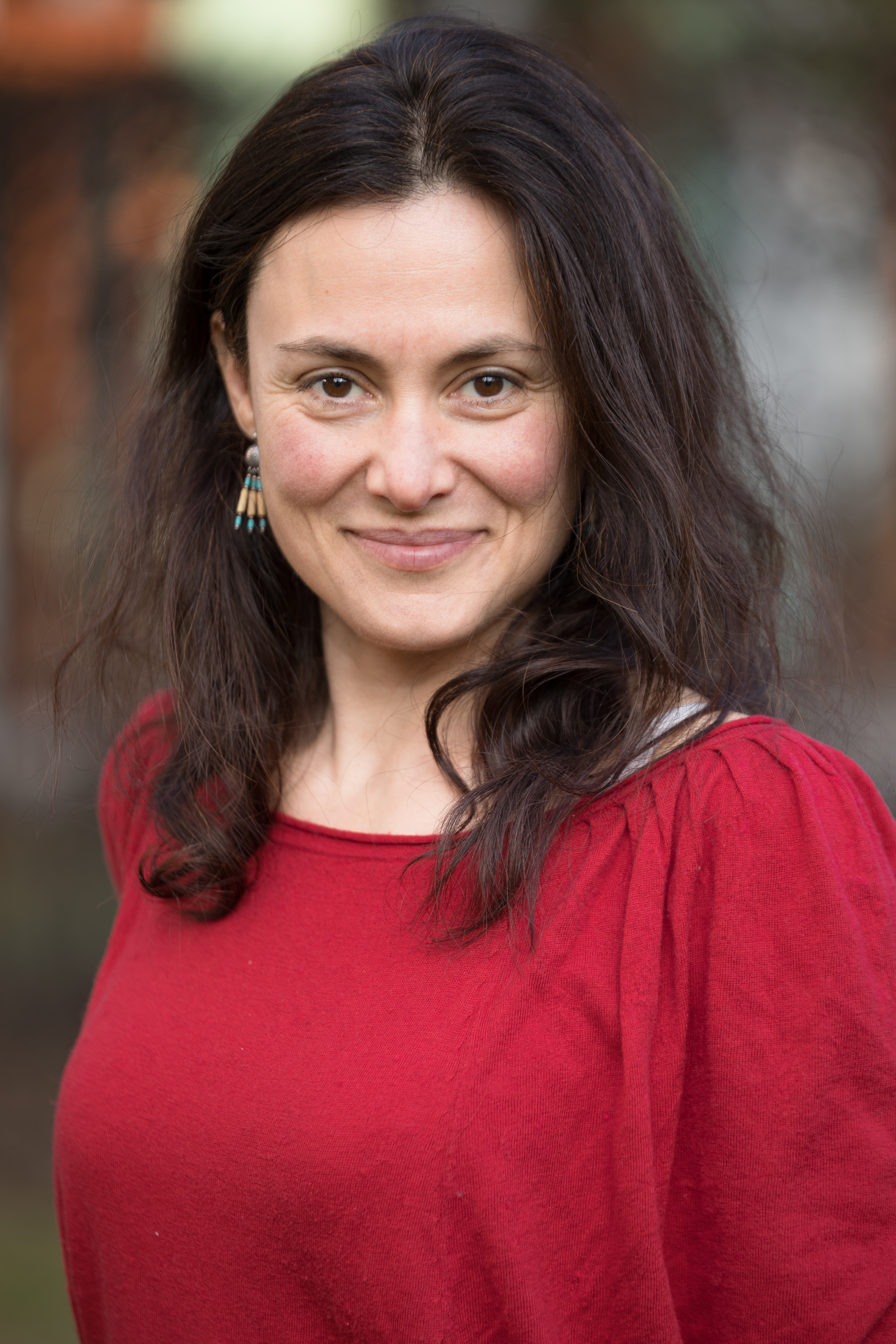
- Born: 1 August 1971 (age 54); West Berlin, West Germany
- Occupation: Actor
- Years active: 1994–present

İdil Üner (born 1 August 1971) is a German-Turkish actress.

Üner studied at the Berlin University of the Arts. She received piano lessons for 17 years—starting from the age of 6—and formal opera training for two years. She joined the youth chapters of the Turkish-speaking theater Tiyatrom in Berlin of which her father was a founding member. She made her television debut in the series Tatort (1993) and her cinema debut with Rudolf Thome's Secret of Love. Üner achieved recognition in the works of Fatih Akın and Thomas Arslan, particularly Dealer and In July. She wrote the lyrics to "Güneşim", the main song of Im Juli. She also wrote and directed a short film in 2001 named Die Liebenden vom Hotel von Osman in which she shares the leading roles with Fatih Akın. In 2004, in the segment directed by Fatih Akin of the film Visions of Europe, Üner sang the title lied by Schumann, "Die alten, bösen Lieder".

== Selected filmography ==
- 1995: Secret of Love
- 1998: Short Sharp Shock (Kurz und schmerzlos)
- 1999: Dealer
- 2000: In July
- 2000: Zwei Mädels auf Mallorca – Die heißeste Nacht des Jahres
- 2001: Rent a Baby
- 2001: Mostly Martha
- 2004: Urban Guerillas
- 2004: Saniye's Lust
- 2005: Istanbul Tales (Anlat İstanbul)
- 2005: Zeit der Wünsche, as Hamife
- 2008: Evet, I Do!
- 2013: A Spicy Kraut
