= Blind Pigs =

Brazilian punk rock band

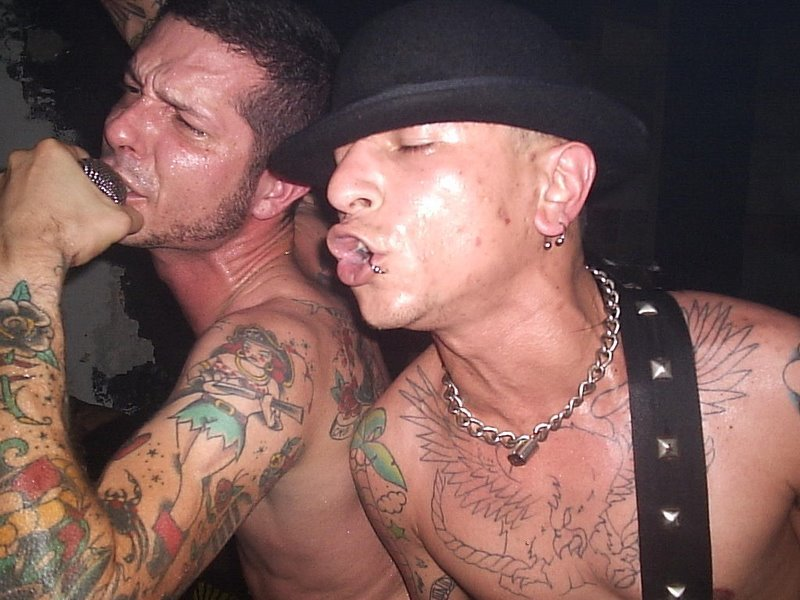
The band live at Rio de Janeiro.

Blind Pigs (also known as Porcos Cegos) is a punk rock band formed in 1993 in the city of Barueri, SP, Brazil, mainly influenced by Forgotten Rebels, Misfits and Ramones. The group entered a hiatus in 2005 and regrouped in 2006 with new band members and the record Heróis ou Rebeldes using the name in Portuguese, "Porcos Cegos". Starting in 2000, the band has released records by its own label Sweet Fury Records.

== History ==
The band's first album, São Paulo Chaos, was produced by Jay Ziskrout, former drummer of Bad Religion. Blind Pigs got into street punk and Oi! on the album Heróis ou Rebeldes but started to use the original name on their next album. In 2016 the band announced its demise because of guitar player's, Fabiano, death. Despite this in 2021 the band released a new album called Lights Out, playing just a few concerts.

In 2024, Pirates Press Records announced a re-release of their 2002 album Blind Pigs.

=== Awards ===
- Best Album: Blind Pigs (self-titled). Punk International, 2002
- Best Punk Band. Punknet Awards, 2004

== Members ==
- Henrike: vocals
- Galindo: bass
- Mauro: guitar
- Arnaldo: drums

=== Past ===
- Pablo: guitar
- Kléber: drums
- Gordo: guitar
- Fabiano: guitar
- Buda: drums
- Fralda: bass

== Discography ==
- São Paulo Chaos (1997) — Paradoxx Music
- The Punks Are Alright (2000) — Sweet Fury Records
- Blind Pigs (2002) — Sweet Fury Records
- Suor, Cerveja e Sangue (live) (2003) — Sweet Fury Records
- Porcos Cegos (EP) (2004) — Sweet Furry Records
- Heróis ou Rebeldes (2006) — Sweet Furry Records
- Capitânia (2013) — Pirates Press Records
- Lights Out (2021) — Hearts Bleed Blue
