= Neco Çelik =

Neco Çelik (born 1972) is a Turkish-German filmmaker.

== Biography ==
Çelik was born in 1972 in Berlin-Kreuzberg to Turkish immigrants. His father was a gardener, and his mother a domestic worker. In his youth, before going into film directing and teaching media, Çelik belonged to a gang called 36 Boys, corresponding to the postal address of Berlin 36 at the time. After making a fake documentary and two short films, he directed two feature films, Alltag and Urban Guerillas, both earning Çelik international acclaim as Germany’s young and upcoming Spike Lee.

== Theater ==
Çelik first staged Feridun Zaimoğlu's Black Virgins (Schwarze Jungfrauen in German) that tells the story of five Muslim women. In June 2009, at the "Almancı Festivali" in Istanbul, he put on stage the Brechtian musical Gazino Arabesk set in Kreuzberg and in which Turkish arabesk songs were performed with German lyrics, and he was inspired by hip hop.

== Cinema ==
Everyday (Alltag) tells the story of a tough neighborhood nicknamed "Little Istanbul" for its large Turkish immigrant population in Kreuzberg, Berlin. "Little Istanbul" is the neighborhood where Çelik himself grew up and is an area that was greatly influenced by all aspects of American hip hop culture. Çelik's work greatly reflects the gap between mainstream German culture and the culture of Kreuzberg. "In Alltag there is only one culture, the desperation-tinged youth culture of Kreuzberg itself, and while that may not exactly correspond to real life, it is Kreuzberg's separateness from the rest of Germany, and not the separateness of those who live within the district, that Mr. Çelik wanted to depict." Veit manages a small laundromat in the neighborhood. He has a sister who helps him out financially, a drug-addicted brother, a mentally ill mother, and a beautiful Turkish neighbor, Aliyah, who is engaged to a Turkish man. A deadly competition develops between Veit and Aliyah's fiancé, culminating in a brutal fight on a subway platform.

In 2007, he made Ganz oben. Türkisch – Deutsch – Erfolgreich, a documentary for the TV network 3Sat about the success stories of five Turks in Germany.

Çelik has stated his plans to adapt İlhan Uçkan's novel Magic of Love (Aşk Büyüsü) to film in August 2010.

=== The film Alltag and Hip-hop Culture in Germany ===
Alltag is important because it depicted the realistic interaction between punk, alternative subcultures and the Gastarbeiter (guest workers invited to Germany in 1960s and 70s to help make up for post war labor shortage) in Germany. The film shows that these subcultures create identities that mix Turkish, German and African-American culture and sets an environment for the growth of Hip-hop in Germany.

The Turkish-German Kreuzberg, the neighborhood that Çelik actually grew up in, is enthralled with sounds and styles of the U.S ghetto. Rap music, graffiti, breakdancing and gangs are all present in Kreuzberg and Çelik's film is a depiction of U.S. influence on youth culture in Kreuzberg.

== Filmography ==
- Naunynritze (Documentary, 1994)
- 36 QM Stoff (Anti-Drug Spot, 1997)
- 36 QM Stoff (Documentary, 1997)
- Hall of Blame (Short, 1998)
- Gettopump (Short, 1998)
- BerliNapoli (Documentary, 1999)
- Sitcom Teaser to Witches Cauldron (2000)
- Alltag (Everyday, 2002)
- Urban Guerillas (2003)
