= Polluting Paradise =

2012 film

- Film poster
- Directed by: Fatih Akın
- Produced by: Fatih Akın
- Cinematography: Hervé Dieu
- Release dates: 18 May 2012 (Cannes); 6 December 2012 (Germany)
- Running time: 97 minutes
- Country: Germany
- Language: German

Polluting Paradise (German: Der Müll im Garten Eden, also known as Garbage in the Garden of Eden) is a 2012 German documentary film directed by Fatih Akın. The film was screened in the Special Screenings section at the 2012 Cannes Film Festival. It focuses on the Turkish village of Çamburnu in Sürmene, which has been turned into a rubbish dump by the government.
