= Head-On (film) =

- Theatrical film poster
- Directed by: Fatih Akın
- Written by: Fatih Akın
- Produced by: Stefan Schubert; Ralph Schwingel; Andreas Schreitmüller; Mehmet Kurtuluş; Fatih Akın
- Starring: Birol Ünel; Sibel Kekilli; Catrin Striebeck; Meltem Cumbul
- Cinematography: Rainer Klausmann
- Edited by: Andrew Bird
- Music by: Alexander Hacke; Mona Mur; Maceo Parker; Daniel Puente Encina ("Niños Con Bombas" and "Polvorosa")
- Production companies: Bavaria Film International; Wüste Filmproduktion; Corazón International; NDR; Arte
- Distributed by: Timebandits Films (Germany); R Film (Turkey)
- Release dates: 12 February 2004 (Berlin); 11 March 2004 (Germany); 19 March 2004 (Turkey)
- Running time: 121 minutes
- Countries: Germany; Turkey
- Languages: German; Turkish; English
- Box office: $11,030,861

Head-On (German: Gegen die Wand, literally Against the Wall; Turkish: Duvara Karşı) is a 2004 drama film written and directed by Fatih Akın. It stars Birol Ünel as a Turkish-born, alcoholic German widower who enters into a marriage of convenience with a young woman of Turkish descent. She is desperate to escape her restrictive and abusive male relatives.

The film won the Golden Bear at the 54th Berlin International Film Festival.

== Plot ==
Cahit Tomruk is a Turkish German in his 40s. He has given up on life after the death of his wife and seeks solace in cocaine and alcohol. One night, he intentionally drives his car head-on into a wall and barely survives.

At the psychiatric clinic where he is treated, a young woman named Sibel Güner approaches him, recognizing him as being Turkish-German. She asks Cahit to marry her, but he rudely declines. Cahit later realizes she is at the hospital after also trying to commit suicide. He sees her interacting with her conservative family who condemn her behaviour and threaten her. Offering him a beer, she confides that her brother broke her nose when he saw her holding hands with a man, and she is desperate to escape her family and needs to marry a fellow Turk to do so.

When Cahit again declines to marry her, she stabs herself in the wrists with a broken bottle. The incident shakes him up, and Cahit agrees to marry Sibel after all on the basis that it is a sham, enabling her to leave her family home and live a sexually free life. He goes to her family pretending he saw her at the hospital where her injuries were treated and seeking their approval to marry her. Despite the age disparity and not knowing much about him, Sibel's family agrees to the marriage.

They live separate private lives but eventually fall in love. After Cahit accidentally kills one of Sibel's former lovers when the lover insults her in public, Cahit is sent to prison and Sibel, her infidelity exposed, is disowned by her family.

While Cahit is in prison, Sibel tells him that she will wait for him and, with nowhere else to stay, goes to Istanbul to her cousin Selma, a single career woman who manages a hotel. Sibel takes a job as a maid in Selma's hotel and stays with her, but finding her new life to be restrictive and conventional, leaves Selma's apartment to live with a bartender who offers her drugs and alcohol. Eventually, he rapes her when she passes out and throws her out. Roaming the streets that night, she is accosted by three men who eventually beat her up. One of them stabs her and they leave her for dead.

Several years later, Cahit travels to Istanbul upon his release from prison, hoping to find Sibel. Selma tells him that Sibel is in a relationship and has a daughter. Cahit waits in a hotel for Sibel's call. It eventually comes, and they meet and have sex for a weekend while her boyfriend is on a business trip. After their tryst, Cahit asks Sibel to take her daughter and run away with him. She agrees but, while packing at home, she hears her husband talking on the phone to her delighted daughter. Cahit waits at the bus stop but she never shows up. The film ends with Cahit on a bus, presumably traveling to Mersin, the city where he was born.

== Cast ==
- Birol Ünel as Cahit Tomruk
- Sibel Kekilli as Sibel Güner
- Catrin Striebeck as Maren
- Güven Kiraç as Seref
- Meltem Cumbul as Selma
- Hermann Lause: Psychotherapist Dr. Schiller
- Demir Gökgöl: Yunus Güner
- Cem Akın: Yilmaz Güner
- Mona Mur: Customer Zoe Bar
- Adam Bousdoukos: Barman 1
- Mehmet Kurtuluş: Barman 2
- Tim Seyfi: Taxidriver
- Fanfare Ciocărlia: Musicians
- Stefan Gebelhoff as Nico
- Francesco Fiannaca as Mann am Tresen

== Reception ==
Head-On received positive reviews. On Rotten Tomatoes, the film has a rating of 91%, based on 88 reviews, with an average rating of 7.35/10. The website's critical consensus reads, "A raw, provocative drama about star-crossed love and the lives of immigrants caught between the traditional and modern." On Metacritic, the film has a score of 78 out of 100, based on 33 critics.

The film has been cited as a favorite by filmmaker John Waters, who presented it as his annual selection for the 2006 Maryland Film Festival.

== Accolades ==
- "Best Film" and the "Audience Award" at the 2004 European Film Awards on 11 December in Barcelona, Spain.
- The Golden Bear for Best Film at 54th Berlin International Film Festival on 14 February 2004.
- The Golden Prize for Best Actress at the Deutscher Filmpreis on 18 June 2004.
- The Quadriga Prize on 3 October 2004 in Berlin.
- The Silver Mirror Award for the Best Movie from the South at the Oslo Film Festival on 16 October 2004.
- The Audience Prize at the 9th Festival de Cine on 6–13 November in Sevilla, Spain.
- The Golden Bambi for the best shooting star at the 56th Bambi-Verleihung on 19 November in Hamburg, Germany
- The Golden Gilde prize for the best German film of 2003-2004 at the Leipzig Film Fair.
- The Goya Award for Best European Film of 2004, on 30 January 2005 in Madrid, Spain.

Awards
Preceded by Good Bye Lenin!	European Film Award for Best European Film; 2004	Succeeded by Hidden (Caché)
Preceded by Good Bye Lenin!	Goya Award for Best European Film; 2004	Succeeded by Match Point
