= Lady Winsley =

- Film poster
- Directed by: Hiner Saleem
- Written by: Hiner Saleem; Thomas Bidegain; Véronique Wüthrich
- Produced by: Marc Bordure; Robert Guédiguian
- Starring: Mehmet Kurtulus; Ezgi Mola; Mesut Akusta
- Cinematography: Andreas Sinanos
- Edited by: Claire Fieschi; Sophie Reine
- Music by: Florence Caillon; Xavier Demerliac
- Production companies: Agat Films & Cie - Ex Nihilo; IFP Istanbul Film Productions; Versus Production
- Distributed by: Memento Films Distribution
- Release date: 2 January 2019 (France)
- Running time: 100 minutes
- Countries: Belgium; France; Turkey
- Language: Turkish
- Box office: $21,740

Lady Winsley (French: Qui a tué Lady Winsley?; Greek: Ποιος Σκότωσε τη Λαίδη Γουίνσλεϊ; Lit.: Who Killed Lady Winsley?) is a French-Turkish-Belgian black comedy mystery film directed by Hiner Saleem.

== Plot ==
Lady Winsley, an American novelist and investigative journalist, is murdered in Büyükada, an island in the Prince archipelago in Turkey. Inspector Fergün arrives from Istanbul to head the investigation. With the help of Azra, the hotel owner at which he is staying at, he has to deal with a distrustful and secretive tight-knit community which harbours numerous taboos, ethnic tensions, has strong family ties, and is attached to ancient traditions.

== Cast ==
- Mehmet Kurtulus: Fergan, detective
- Ezgi Mola: Azra, hotel owner
- Ahmet Uz: Kasim
- Mesut Akusta: Ismail
- Ergun Kuyucu: Captain Celik
- Senay Gürler: Lady Winsley
- Turgay Avdın: Burak Ozluk, journalist
- Korkmaz Aslan: Sercan Birol
