= Ötüken Neşriyat =

Ötüken Publishing
- Founded: 1964
- Country of origin: Turkey
- Key people: Mehmet Niyazi Özdemir; Nevzat Köseoğlu; Mustafa Yıldırım
- Nonfiction topics: Turkish literature Culture of Turkey
- Official website: www.otuken.com.tr

Ötüken Neşriyat is a publishing house founded in 1964 in Şehzadebaşı by university students. It publishes under the slogan “Books to be read at all times.” The first book it published was Reis Bey by Necip Fazıl Kısakürek. Subsequently, all of the author’s works were published by this publishing house. In its early years, Ötüken Neşriyat published works by prominent intellectuals of the period such as Yılmaz Öztuna, Tarık Buğra, Erol Güngör, Arif Nihat Asya, Cemil Meriç, Mehmet Fuad Köprülü, Abdülhak Şinasi Hisar, and Nihâl Atsız.

In 1978, with the partnership of its original founders Ahmet Nuri Yüksel, Nevzat Kösoğlu, Mehmed Niyazi Özdemir, Hasan Fehim Üçışık, Ahmet İyioldu, Özer Ravanoğlu, Mustafa Yıldırım, and Nurhan Alpay it became a joint stock company, thereby completing its institutionalization. In 2014, it celebrated its 50th anniversary. In 2015, it received the Culture and Arts Grand Award, a prestigious honor presented annually by the Ministry of Culture and Tourism.
