= Mehmet Kurtuluş =

Turkish actor (b. 1972)

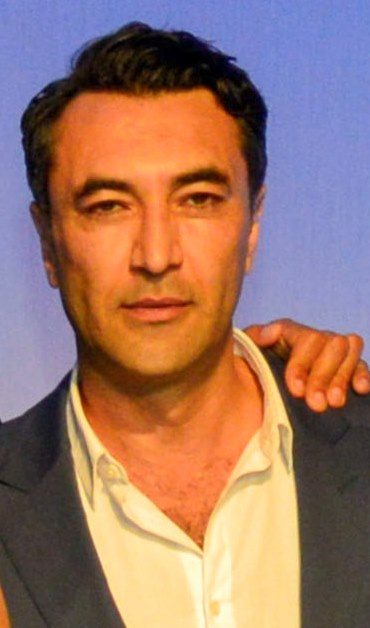
- Kurtuluş in 2015
- Born: 27 April 1972 (age 54); Uşak, Turkey
- Occupation: Actor
- Years active: 1993–present
- Spouse: Désirée Nosbusch (m. 2005; div. 2013)

Mehmet Kurtuluş (born 27 April 1972) is a Turkish-German actor. He is best known for his work with German director Fatih Akin.

== Life and career ==
Kurtuluş was born in Uşak, Turkey, and moved at the age of 18 months to Germany, where he grew up with his brother, Tekin, in Salzgitter, Lower Saxony.

He performed several minor television roles in episodes of different TV shows and continued working in theater until his big-screen debut in his main role as the young Turkish boy Gabriel in Fatih Akın's film Kurz und schmerzlos (Short Sharp Shock). After his breakthrough he appeared in the successful TV mini-series The Tunnel, of Roland Suso Richter, where he performed alongside Heino Ferch and Nicolette Krebitz. Doris Dörrie chose him for her sex comedy Naked. He went back to working in television with the love film Eine Liebe in Saigon (Love in Saigon) with Luxembourgian actress Désirée Nosbusch (to whom Kurtuluş was engaged).

Kurtuluş played the main detective role in six episodes of the cult German television series Tatort. He announced afterwards that he would be working on international projects. In 2014, he co-starred with Samuel L. Jackson and Ray Stevenson in the Finnish-British action thriller Big Game.

== Filmography ==
=== Film ===
- 1996: Getürkt (Short) - Ilami
- 1998: Short Sharp Shock (Kurz und schmerzlos) - Gabriel
- 2000: In July - Isa
- 2001: The Tunnel - Vittorio 'Vic' Castanza
- 2001: Heart - Cem Rüya
- 2001: Boran - Deniz Akim
- 2002: Naked - Dylan
- 2002: Equilibrium - Search Coordinator
- 2003: Abdülhamit Düşerken - Sefik Bey
- 2004: Head-On (Gegen die Wand) - Barmann Istanbul
- 2004: Soundless - Sicherheitschef des Russen
- 2007: Pars: Kiraz operasyonu - Atilla Karahan
- 2009: Vasha - Artur
- 2010: Transfer - Laurin
- 2014: Big Game - Hazar
- 2014: Head Full of Honey - Dr. Holst
- 2015: Famous Five 4 - Farouk
- 2015: 8 Seconds - Sami
- 2016: Tereddüt - Cem / Sehnaz's Husband
- 2017: Schneeflöckchen - Feuer
- 2019: Lady Winsley - Fergan
- 2019: Abikalypse - Mustis Vater
- 2024: Mary - Baba ben Buta

=== Television ===
- 1993: Adelheid und ihre Mörder - Hassan
- 1995: SK-Babies - Hakan Yassin
- 1995: Sterne des Südens - Selçuk
- 1996: Doppelter Einsatz - Hakan Yassin
- 2004: Love in Saigon - Selçuk
- 2007–2012: Tatort - Cenk Batu / Cem Aslan
- 2015–2016: Muhteşem Yüzyıl: Kösem - Dervish Pasha
- 2018: The Protector - Mazhar Dragusha
- 2020–2022: Into the Night - Ayaz Kobanbay
- 2024: Testament: The Story of Moses - Pharaoh

FBI International S03E05

== Awards ==
- Locarno International Film Festival 1998: Best Actor for Short Sharp Shock
- Grimme-Preis 2001: Short Sharp Shock
- Grimme-Preis 2009: Tatort – Auf der Sonnenseite
