= Anastasia Zampounidis =

Greek-German entertainer

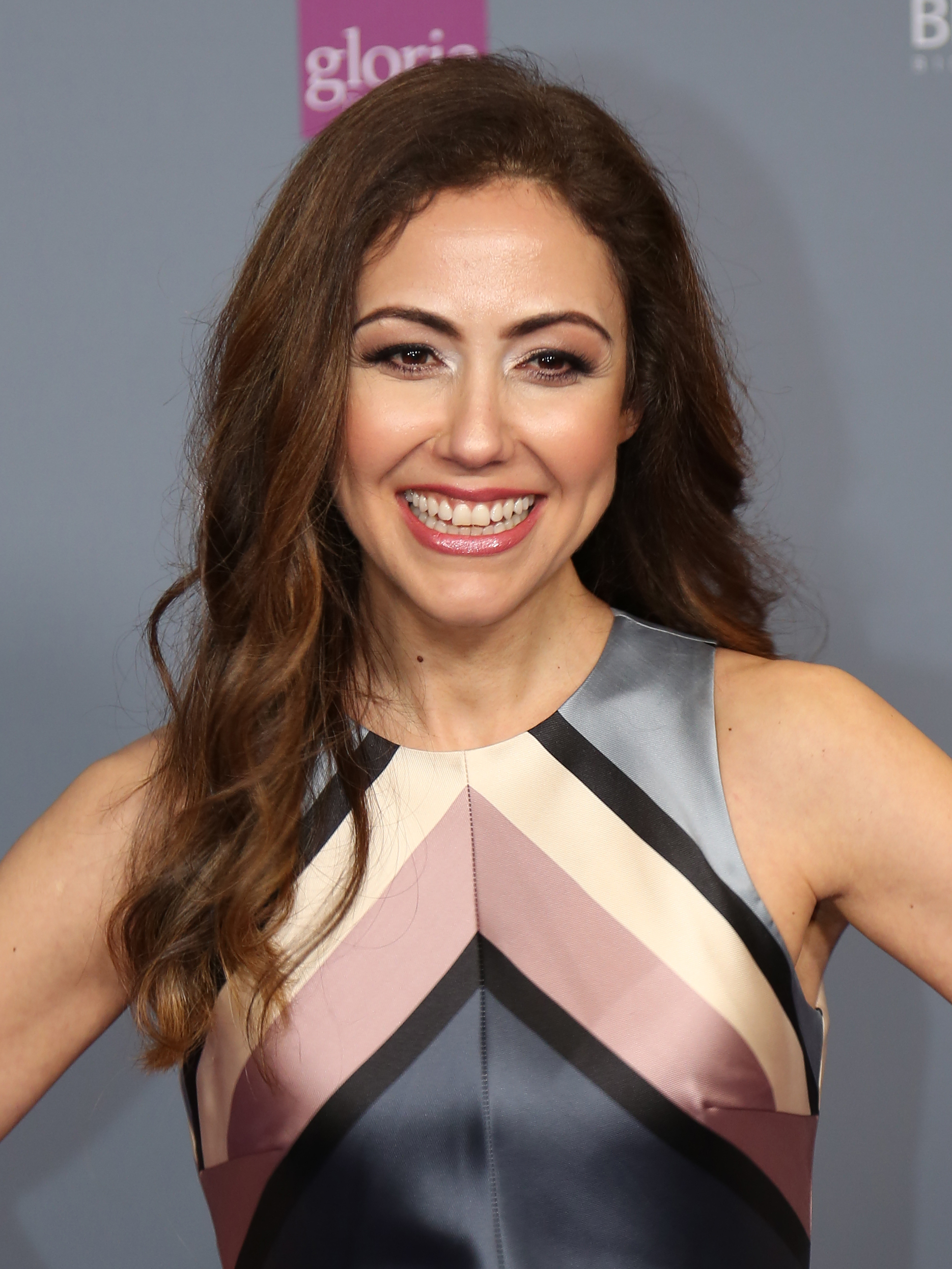
- Zampounidis in 2017
- Born: 28 December 1968 (age 57); Thessaloniki, Greece
- Occupations: VJ on MTV Germany, Actor

Anastasia Zampounidis (Greek: Αναστασία Ζαμπουνίδη; born 28 December 1968) is a Greek-German TV host.

== Climb to Fame ==
After graduating from high school, Zampounidis spent time in Los Angeles as an au pair, Go-Go dancer, and language tutor. While in LA she broadcast a radio program for Berlin radio. She ranked #55 2001, #68 2002, #57 2003 and #98 2004 in FHM-Germany's Sexiest Women.

== Filmography ==
- "The Dome", (1997) TV Series .... (Backstage Reporter) (2002–2005)
- MTV Germany, (host of "Select MTV") (2002)
- Rotlicht - Im Dickicht der Großstadt, (TV) .... (Supporting actress) (2003)
- "Comeback - Die große Chance"' TV Mini Series ... (Jury Member) (2004)
- "Total Request Live", TV Series .... Host (2004)
- MTV live show "TRL", (daily host) (2005)
