= Alltag =

2003 television film directed by Neco Celik

- Directed by: Neco Celik
- Starring: Florian Panzner; Neelesha Barthel; Erhan Emre; Kida Khodr Ramadan
- Country of origin: Germany

Original release
- Release: 2003

Alltag, released in 2003 by Turkish-German director Neco Celik, is a film depicting life in the neighborhood of Kreuzberg. The film has particular significance in the arena of Turkish-German hip-hop and hip-hop life in the neighborhood. Celik was born in 1972 and grew up in the neighborhood of Kreuzberg, and was directly influenced by the presence of hip hop and gang culture in Kreuzberg.

Some people see the film as testament to the Americanization of cultures in Europe and a report from the "frontlines". The film is not only evidence of the prevalence of hip hop in ethnic minorities in Germany, but the popularity of hip hop in Germany. Some critics dubbed Neco Celik "the next Spike Lee".

== Cast ==
- Florian Panzner as Veit Bischoff
- Neelesha Barthel as Aliya Emre
- Erhan Emre as Jabbar
- Kida Khodr Ramadan as Kida
