= Solino =

- German DVD cover
- Directed by: Fatih Akin
- Written by: Ruth Toma
- Starring: Barnaby Metschurat; Moritz Bleibtreu; Gigi Savoia; Antonella Attili; Gianluca Milano
- Release date: 2002
- Running time: 124 minutes
- Countries: Italy; Germany
- Languages: German; Italian

Solino is a 2002 Italian-German movie directed by Fatih Akın and starring Moritz Bleibtreu, Barnaby Metschurat, Gigi Savoia and Antonella Attili.

== Plot ==
The movie portrays the story of an Italian family that emigrated to Germany in the 1960s. Romano (Gigi Savoia), the father, decides to open a pizzeria which, by mutual decision with the wife Rosa (Antonella Attili), they call Solino, after their village in Abruzzo, Italy. As they grow up, his sons Gigi and Giancarlo begin to work there. A hostile relationship comes to life between the father and his sons, which will end up in the forced departure of the boys from the family apartment.

The sons, Giancarlo and Gigi, move into an apartment which they share with their childhood friend Johanna. Gigi and Johanna kindle a romance between them, to Giancarlo's dismay. Meanwhile, things go wrong between their parents Romano and Rosa, prompting Rosa to move in with her sons and their roommate. Tension between the brothers becomes intense when Rosa, for health reasons, needs to return to Italy long-term. One son must accompany her and neither wishes to, as it would leave Johanna to the other.

== Cast ==
Actor	Role
Moritz Bleibtreu	Giancarlo Amato
Barnaby Metschurat	Gigi Amato
Gigi Savoia	Romano Amato
Antonella Attili	Rosa Amato
Gianluca Milano	

== Notes ==
- (1)http://movies.nytimes.com/movie/284376/Solino/overview
- (2)http://www.timeout.com/film/reviews/74931/Solino.html
- (3)https://web.archive.org/web/20080212224540/http://www.br-online.de/kultur-szene/film/kino/0308/00414/
