= In July (film) =

- DVD cover
- Directed by: Fatih Akın
- Starring: Moritz Bleibtreu; Christiane Paul
- Distributed by: Senator Film (Germany)
- Release date: 24 August 2000 (Germany)
- Countries: Germany, Turkey
- Languages: German, Turkish

In July (German: Im Juli.) is a 2000 German-Turkish road movie.

== Plot ==
At the beginning of his summer holiday, a somewhat naive trainee teacher Daniel (Moritz Bleibtreu) buys a ring from a stall run by a neighbor, the aspiring artist and street vendor Juli (in German, "Juli" would be not only the month July but also a common nickname for someone named "Julia"; Christiane Paul). The ring bears a Mayan sun symbol, which, according to Juli, has the power to lead him to the woman of his dreams, whom he will recognise by a similar sun symbol. As Juli has the ring's counterpart, and as she is in love with him, she invites Daniel to a party that evening, hoping that they will meet.

Curious, Daniel goes to the party and meets Melek (İdil Üner), a young Turkish woman who is wearing a T-shirt imprinted with a sun symbol. Convinced that she is the woman of his dreams, Daniel talks to her. Melek is only passing through and looking for a place to spend the night. After spending the evening together seeing the sights of Hamburg, Daniel invites her to spend the night in his apartment.

Daniel and Melek leave the party just as Juli arrives. She sees them leave together. In her disappointment, she decides to leave town. Next day she goes to the Autobahn to hitch a ride, with no predetermined destination.

As fate would have it, Daniel is the first car to stop, on his way back from the airport, where he has just dropped Melek off. He has decided to drive to Istanbul in search of Melek, who, as she told him, will be under the bridge over the Bosporus at a certain time a few days later, although he does not know why. Daniel takes Juli with him in his stoner roommate's rusty old car. And this is the beginning of a long and exciting trip across a scorching hot Southeastern Europe.

== Symbolism ==
The film opens with an eclipse, an event in which the sun and the moon cross paths. Daniel crosses paths with Luna, whose name means "moon," and suffers the consequences. July is a sunny month.

== Cast ==
- Moritz Bleibtreu as Daniel Bannier
- Christiane Paul as Juli
- İdil Üner as Melek
- Mehmet Kurtuluş as İsa
- Jochen Nickel as Leo
- Branka Katić as Luna
- Birol Ünel as Club Doyen
- Sandra Borgmann as Marion
- Ernest Hausmann as Kodjo, Daniel's neighbour
- Gábor Salinger as Jewellery vendor in Hungarian market
- Cem Akın as Turkish border guard
- Fatih Akın as Romanian border guard
- Sándor Badár as Alin
- Daniel Puente Encina as singer and musician. Cameo appearance with his band Niños Con Bombas.

== Trivia ==
- The sequence of the film when Daniel and Juli travel through Romania is made up of a series of still photos, a decision taken for mainly financial reasons.
- The director has a cameo as a Romanian border guard at a checkpoint on the Hungarian-Romanian border.
- The director's brother Cem Akin plays the role of a Turkish border guard on a checkpoint of the Bulgarian-Turkish border.
- Fatih Akin attended the school shown at the beginning of the film.

== Accolades ==
- German Film Awards 2001: Moritz Bleibtreu (Best actor)
- Tromsø International Film Festival 2001: People's choice award: Fatih Akin (Best direction)
- Jupiter 2001 (Best actor: Moritz Bleibtreu; best director: Fatih Akin)
