= Fatih Akin =

German and Turkish filmmaker (born 1973)

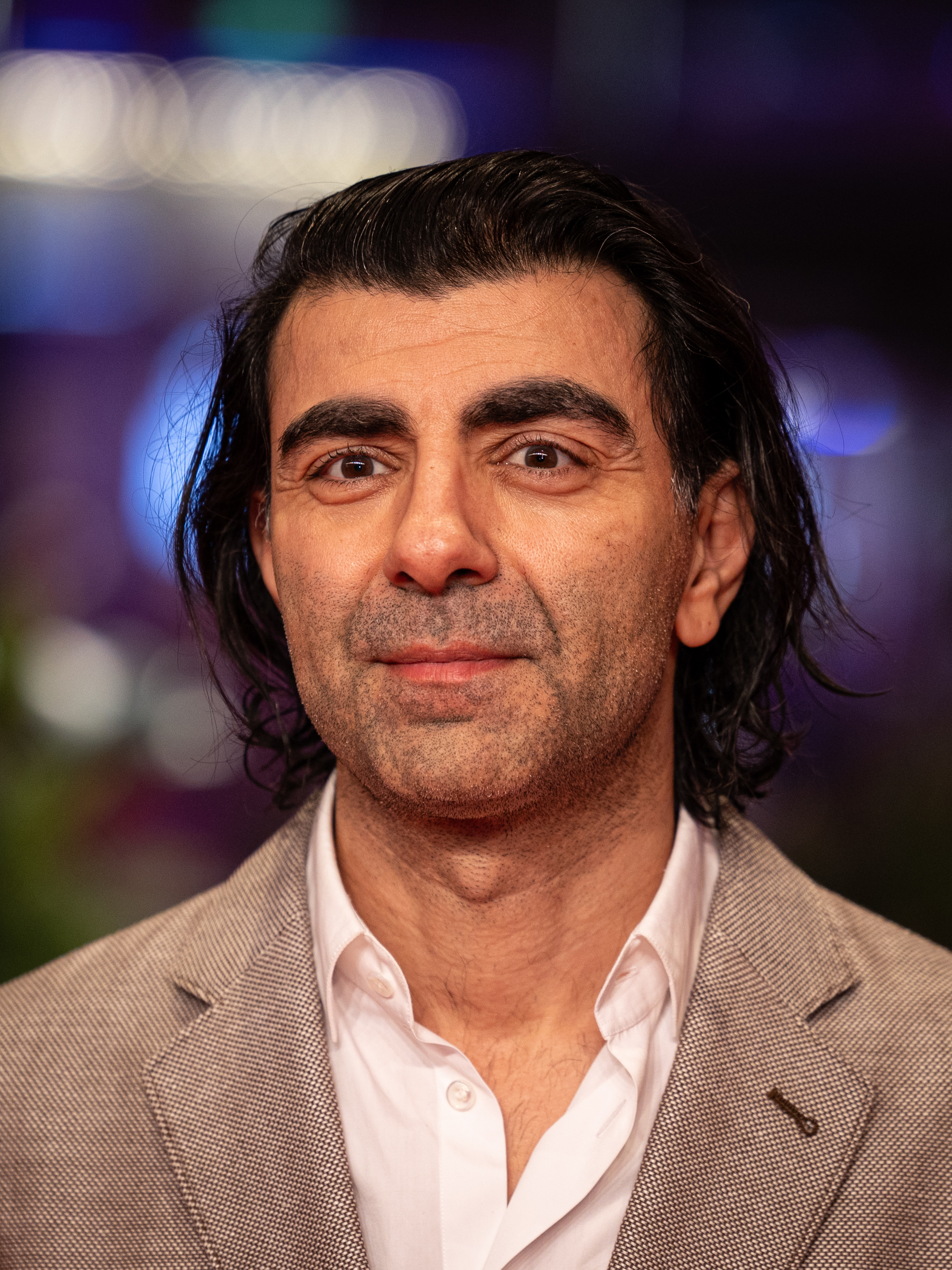
- Akin in 2024
- Born: 25 August 1973 (age 53); Hamburg, West Germany
- Occupations: Film director, screenwriter, producer
- Years active: 1995–present
- Spouse: Monique Obermüller (m. 2004)
- Children: 2

Fatih Akin (Turkish: Fatih Akın; born 25 August 1973) is a German and Turkish film director, screenwriter and producer. His films have won numerous awards and accolades, including the Golden Bear at the Berlin Film Festival for his film Head-On (2004), Best Screenplay at the Cannes Film Festival for his film The Edge of Heaven (2007), and the Golden Globe Award for Best Foreign Language Film for his film In the Fade (2017).

== Early life ==
Akin was born to Turkish parents in Hamburg in West Germany. He has one brother, actor Cem Akin. He attended the University of Fine Arts of Hamburg to study visual communications, graduating in 2000.

Akin has been married to German-Mexican actress Monique Obermüller since 2004. The couple live in Hamburg-Altona, close to where he was raised. They have two children.

== Career ==
Akin made his debut as director of a full-length film as early as 1998 with Short Sharp Shock (Kurz und schmerzlos), which brought him the "Bronze Leopard" award at the Locarno International Film Festival in Switzerland and the "Pierrot", the Bavarian Film Award for Best New Director in Munich the same year. Since then he has directed feature films such as In July (Im Juli) in 2000, We forgot to go back (Wir haben vergessen zurückzukehren) in 2001 and Solino' in 2002.

His fourth film, Head-On (Gegen die Wand), starring Sibel Kekilli, was a major success in 2004 and received several prizes, among them the Golden Bear award at the Berlin Film Festival and the "Best Film" and the "Audience Award" at the 2004 European Film Awards.

In 2005, he directed a documentary about the Istanbul music scene, Crossing the Bridge: The Sound of Istanbul, which includes musicians such as Ceza, Sezen Aksu, Aynur Doğan and Brenna MacCrimmon. It is narrated by a member of a German experimental band Einstürzende Neubauten, Alexander Hacke, who also produced music for Head-On.

In 2007, Akin's The Edge of Heaven, a German-Turkish cross-cultural tale of loss, mourning and forgiveness, won the prize for Best Screenplay at the 60th Cannes Film Festival in 2007. On 24 October 2007 the same film was awarded the first edition of the LUX prize for European cinema by the European Parliament.

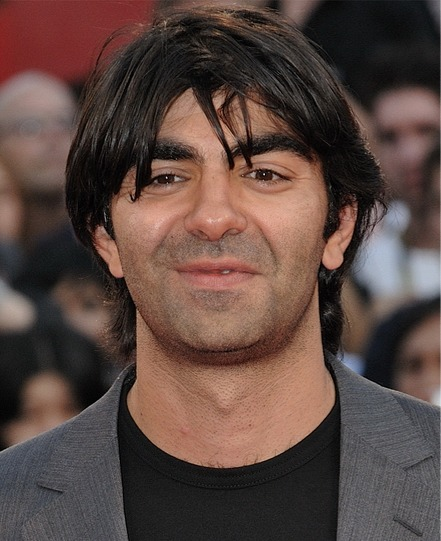
Akin in 2009

About the comedy Soul Kitchen (2009) he has said he chose this more light-hearted film because he needed a break after making the "tough" films Head-On and The Edge of Heaven before making his next planned film The Devil. "But", he says, "now I feel ready to finish the trilogy".

In 2012, his documentary film Polluting Paradise was screened in the Special Screenings section at the 2012 Cannes Film Festival.

His 2014 film The Cut was selected to compete for the Golden Lion at the 71st Venice International Film Festival.

In 2017, Akin's film In the Fade was selected to compete for the Palme d'Or in the main competition section at the 2017 Cannes Film Festival. At Cannes that year, Diane Kruger won the Best Actress award. The film was subsequently selected as the German entry for the Best Foreign Language Film at the 90th Academy Awards, making the December shortlist. In the Fade won the Golden Globe for Best Foreign Language Film.

== Controversy and death threats ==
For his shooting of The Cut, a movie on the Armenian genocide, Akin received thousands of death threats by Turkish nationalists.

The Turkish nationalist organization Ötüken Neşriyat threatened Akin for shooting the movie. They wrote a statement in which they called Akin a "Kurdish director" and accused him of having a "close relationship with [the] PKK", openly threatening the newspaper Agos, Armenians and Akin himself, writing that "we are not going to let this movie to get screened in Turkey". They threatened that Akın and those associated with the film would suffer the "same fate as Hrant Dink", an Armenian-Turkish journalist who was assassinated in 2007 by a Turkish nationalist. The group explicitly noted they were monitoring the situation with their "white berets", the symbolic headwear worn by Dink's assassin.

Akin was reportedly not surprised by the threats, stating that "I spent 7 or 8 years working on this movie, I had time to anticipate what the reaction would be".

== Works ==
=== Feature films ===
Year	English title	Original title	Notes
1998	Short Sharp Shock	Kurz und schmerzlos	Bronze Leopard at Locarno Film Festival
2000	In July	Im Juli.	
2002	Solino		
2004	Head-On	Gegen die Wand	Golden Bear winner
2007	The Edge of Heaven	Auf der anderen Seite	Best Screenplay at 2007 Cannes Film Festival
2009	Soul Kitchen		Special Jury Prize at 66th Venice International Film Festival
2014	The Cut		
2016	Goodbye Berlin	Tschick	
2017	In the Fade	Aus dem Nichts	Golden Globe Award for Best Foreign Language Film
2019	The Golden Glove	Der goldene Handschuh	
2022	Rhinegold	Rheingold	
2025	Amrum		
2026	Ghost Song	Geister	

=== Documentaries ===
Year	English title	Original title
2005	Crossing the Bridge: The Sound of Istanbul	
2012	Polluting Paradise	Der Müll im Garten Eden

=== Other credits ===
Year	English title	Original title	Notes
1995	Sensin... You're the One!	Sensin – Du bist es!	Short film
1996	Weed	Getürkt	Short film
1997	Back in Trouble		Actor
2001	Denk ich an Deutschland … – Wir haben vergessen zurückzukehren		TV documentary series episode
2004	Visions of Europe	Europäische Visionen	segment Die bösen alten Lieder
2004	Kebab Connection		Co-writer
2004	Robbery Alla Turca	Hırsız Var!	Actor (Lokman)
2008	New York, I Love You		A segment
2019	30/30 Vision: 3 Decades of Strand Releasing		anthology film segment

=== Video games ===
Year	Title	Role	Notes
2025	Death Stranding 2: On the Beach	Dollman	Likeness

== Awards ==
- 1998 Bavarian Film Awards, Best New Director
- 2004 Golden Bear at the Berlin Film Festival
- 2004 European Film Awards, Best Film, Audience Award
- 2007 Antalya Golden Orange Film Festival Golden Orange Award, Best Director
- 2007 Bavarian Film Awards, Best Director
- 2007 LUX Prize for European Cinema awarded by European Parliament
- 2007 Cannes Film Festival, Best Screenplay
- 2010 Order of Merit of the Federal Republic of Germany for his contribution in depicting the problems of Turkish-Germans.
- 2018 Golden Globe Award, Best Foreign Language Film
- 2026 [BCN Film Festival], Best Film

== Collaborations ==
Actors	Short Sharp Shock	In July	Solino	Head-On	The Edge of Heaven	Soul Kitchen	The Cut
Cem Akin	check	check	check	check	check	check	
Moritz Bleibtreu		check	check			check	check
Adam Bousdoukos	check	check	check	check		check	check
Stefan Gebelhoff			check	check			
Demir Gökgöl			check			check	
Marc Hosemann	check					check	
Mehmet Kurtuluş	check	check		check			
Hermann Lause			check	check			
Catrin Striebeck				check		check	
Birol Ünel		check		check		check	
İdil Üner	check	check		check	check		
Patrycia Ziółkowska			check		check	check	check

== Bibliography ==
- Barbara Kosta, "Transcultural Exchanges: Fatih Akin's Crossing the Bridge: The Sound of Istanbul (2005)," in Martinson, Steven D. / Schulz, Renate A. (Eds./hg.), Transcultural German Studies / Deutsch als Fremdsprache: Building Bridges / Brücken bauen (Bern etc., Peter Lang, 2008) (Jahrbuch für Internationale Germanistik, Reihe A: Kongressberichte, 94),
