= Short Sharp Shock (film) =

- Directed by: Fatih Akın
- Written by: Fatih Akın
- Produced by: Stefan Schubert; Ralph Schwingel
- Starring: Mehmet Kurtuluş; Aleksandar Jovanovic; Adam Bousdoukos; Regula Grauwiller
- Cinematography: Frank Barbian
- Edited by: Andrew D. Bird
- Music by: Ulrich Kodjo Wendt
- Production companies: Wüste Filmproduktion; Zweites Deutsches Fernsehen (ZDF)
- Distributed by: PolyGram Filmed Entertainment
- Release date: 15 October 1998
- Running time: 100 minutes
- Country: Germany
- Language: German

Short Sharp Shock (German: Kurz und schmerzlos) is a 1998 film directed by Turkish-German director Fatih Akın.

The film, which according to Rekin Teksoy, writing in Turkish Cinema, "focuses on the identity crises faced by German youth from various ethnic backgrounds," was the feature debut of the German-born director of Turkish descent and is said to have "represented a new German-Turkish cinema."

== Plot ==
Gabriel the Turk, Bobby the Serb and Costa the Greek are three friends who used to form a neighborhood gang in the Altona district of Hamburg. Following his release from prison Gabriel is ready for a new start on life. However, Bobby has been doing jobs for crazed Albanian mobster Muhamer and his girlfriend Alice turns to Gabriel for comfort. Costa has turned to petty theft and is dating Gabriel's sister, Ceyda. He also joins Muhamer's gang. Gabriel intervenes to save his friends, an action which puts his dreams of retiring to Turkey at risk.

== Cast ==
- Mehmet Kurtuluş as Gabriel
- Aleksandar Jovanovic as Bobby
- Adam Bousdoukos as Costa
- Regula Grauwiller as Alice
- İdil Üner as Ceyda
- Ralph Herforth as Muhamer

The film's director, Fatih Akın, makes a cameo appearance as the drug dealer Nejo.

== Production ==
Fatih Akın had been working on the screenplay for this film, which was his feature debut, while he was studying at the Hamburg College of the Arts (HFBK) and working on his earlier shorts Sensin... You're the One! and Weed. The success of these shorts allowed him to secure funding from the Hamburg-based film production company Wüste Filmproduktion for this film, which was shot on the streets of Altona in his hometown of Hamburg.

== Release ==
The film was premiered at the 1998 Locarno International Film Festival and was screened at the 1998 Hamburg Film Festival before going on general release across Germany on 15 October 1998.

Following the release Akın said of the film, inspired by the work of Italian-American film director Martin Scorsese, that, “It took Scorsese and the other Italo-Americans 70 years to start making their films. The Maghribi-French needed 30 years for their cinéma beur. We've been much quicker. We’re already doing it!”

== Reception ==
=== Reviews ===
Katja Nicodemus gave it a favorable review in Magazin-Deutschland, saying the film "represented a new German-Turkish cinema".

=== Awards and nominations ===
- 1998 Locarno International Film Festival
  - Best Actor: Aleksandar Jovanovic, Adam Bousdoukos & Mehmet Kurtuluş (won)
  - Golden Leopard: Fatih Akın (nominated)
- 1998 Thessaloniki International Film Festival
  - Best Actor: Mehmet Kurtuluş (won)
  - Golden Alexander: Fatih Akın (nominated)
- 1999 Bavarian Film Award for Best Young Director: Fatih Akın (won)
- 1999 German Film Award in Gold
  - Outstanding Feature Film (nominated)
  - Outstanding Individual Achievement in Direction: Fatih Akın (nominated)
- 1999 Angers European First Film Festival Jean Carment Award: Aleksandar Jovanovic (won)
- 1999 Festival de Film d'Adventures de Valenciennes Distribution Award (won)
- 2001 Adolf Grimme Award for Fiction/Entertainment: Fatih Akın, Aleksandar Jovanovic, Adam Bousdoukos & Mehmet Kurtuluş (won)
