= Army of the Dead (franchise) =

American zombie media franchise

- Official franchise logo
- Based on: The Living Dead franchise by: George A. Romero; John A. Russo
- Distributed by: Netflix
- Release date: 2021
- Country: United States
- Language: English

The Army of the Dead franchise consists of American zombie-action horror installments released in 2021, which serve as spiritual sequels to the 2004 remake of Dawn of the Dead (1978). The franchise consists of a streaming release film that was also released in theaters for a limited time, and a prequel film, as well as two short films.

The original film, entitled Army of the Dead, was stuck in development hell for a number of years until Netflix acquired the distribution rights from Universal and Warner Bros. Pictures; the film was released in May 2021. Though it was met with mixed critical reception, the movie succeeded as one of the most popular films of all time from Netflix, with an estimated 75 million homes streaming the movie. A prequel film, titled Army of Thieves, was released later that year in October.

The franchise was expected to continue with subsequent films, including a direct sequel to the original film titled Planet of the Dead, along with a prequel anime-styled television series titled Army of the Dead: Lost Vegas for exclusive release on Netflix, and even was set to feature crossover elements with Zack Snyder's other franchise, Rebel Moon; however, it was later reported by multiple outlets that these projects were quietly cancelled in August 2024 along with all further projects in the franchise.

== Development ==
=== Origin ===
Producer Eric Newman originally conceived plans to remake George A. Romero's 1978 cult horror film Dawn of the Dead. A fan of the original film, Newman asked Strike Entertainment's Marc Abraham to produce the remake with him. Abraham agreed, and the two secured the rights to the film from Richard P. Rubinstein, the original's producer. Rubinstein finally agreed to grant the rights after several years because he was worried "that somewhere along the way a studio would sanitize Newman's vision for producing a version with 'attitude'", as Romero's film was independently produced. In addition, the producer was impressed by Abraham's "long track record in keeping the creative integrity of the studio distributed films he has produced intact".

Newman and Abraham said that the new Dawn of the Dead is more of a "re-envisioning" of Romero's film geared toward younger audiences who had not seen the original. Newman stated that the production's goal is "to make the old fans happy and make a lot of new fans. Because that's the only reason we are doing it." He cited his favorite classic horror films Invasion of the Body Snatchers (1978), The Thing (1982), and The Fly (1986) as cinematic influences, explaining that these had "some amazing updates" which "add to rather than diminish the original films". In search of a screenwriter, Rubinstein hired James Gunn, an avid fan of the original, who began writing a draft. Michael Tolkin and Scott Frank did some uncredited work on Gunn's script. Rubinstein stated that Tolkin further developed the characters while Frank provided some of the bigger, upbeat action scenes. This was director Zack Snyder's directorial debut, and he storyboarded the film.

=== Production ===
In June 2008, after the financial and critical successes of Dawn of the Dead, another zombie film was announced to be in development. Matthijs van Heijningen Jr. signed on as director, with a script from Joby Harold, based on an original story by Zack Snyder. The plot centers around a father who is determined to save his daughter from a quarantined and zombie-infested Las Vegas. Snyder described the film as a zombie movie on a larger scale. The project was scheduled to be a co-production between Universal Pictures and Warner Bros. Pictures. The film remained in development hell for a number of years, with Snyder later reporting that the studios involved "didn't want to spend that kind of money on a zombie movie, or just didn't take it that seriously."

By January 2019, Netflix acquired the distribution rights to the project from Universal and Warner Bros. with Zack Snyder returning as director. The filmmaker also serves as co-screenwriter with Shay Hatten, based on the story treatment previously written by Snyder and Joby Harold. Snyder stated that Dawn of the Dead is "a zombie movie...all the way with all of [the] tropes of the genre", stating: "I started to think of what were other genres that story didn't have room for." After having a meeting with Scott Stuber, head of original films at Netflix, Stuber signed on to produce the project immediately. Described as a spiritual successor to Dawn of the Dead, Army of the Dead is designed as a franchise launcher. The studio liked the concept enough to also green-light a four-hour anime-styled animated prequel television series, as well as a spin-off prequel film. Army of the Dead commenced principal photography in mid-2019, with a reported budget of $90 million. The film was scheduled to be released on May 21, 2021.

In September 2020, an Army of the Dead spin-off prequel film was announced as being in development. The story involves multiple characters from the first film, with events taking place prior to the events of the previous installment. Matthias Schweighöfer reprised his role from the previous film with the plot centered around his character. In addition to co-starring, he served as director and co-producer. Shay Hatten, who co-wrote the script for the previous movie, returned as screenwriter. Additional producers include Zack Snyder, Deborah Snyder, Wesley Coller, and Dan Maag. The project was a joint-venture production between The Stone Quarry, Pantaleon Films, and Netflix Original Films.

By December 2020 filming had wrapped with the working title of "Army of the Dead: The Prequel". By April 2021, it was revealed that the official title of the movie would be Army of Thieves.

== Films ==
Film	U.S. release date	Director	Screenwriter(s)	Story by	Producers	Status
Army of the Dead	May 21, 2021	Zack Snyder	Zack Snyder, Shay Hatten & Joby Harold	Zack Snyder	Zack Snyder, Wesley Coller & Deborah Snyder	Released
Army of Thieves	October 29, 2021	Matthias Schweighöfer	Shay Hatten	Zack Snyder & Shay Hatten	Dan Maag, Zack Snyder, Wesley Coller, Deborah Snyder & Matthias Schweighöfer	Released

=== Army of the Dead (2021) ===
As U.S. military convoy makes its way en route from Area 51 with a transfer of a top secret government-weapon, bioengineered through experimentation with extraterrestrial DNA; it breaks free and quickly destroys everything in its path. As it attacks the military personnel, it passes on an infection rapidly spreading a disease that overtakes Las Vegas, Nevada. Some time thereafter, the U.S. government quarantines the surrounding area with plans for a tactical nuclear air strike to wipe the outbreak of walking dead from the Earth before it spreads. As the scheduled day draws near, a wealthy owner of a casino on the Strip hires a small group of mercenaries to infiltrate the infestation and pull off a dangerous heist and retrieve all the cash stored in the vault, his establishment, before time runs out. In return the team can keep a percentage of the funds.

As they work together to complete the mission, they discover an evolved-form of zombies. These "alphas" who were directly infected from the original Area 51 experiment are smarter, stronger, faster, and organized. A scene featuring a news article references events which transpired in Milwaukee, Wisconsin. Jointly the team struggles in a race against the clock to retrieve the money, rescue family members who have been taken hostage by the alpha zombies, and fight off the living dead.

=== Army of Thieves (2021) ===
In September 2020, Netflix announced plans to expand Army of the Dead into various other properties. A prequel film was announced to be in development under the working title of "Army of the Dead: The Prequel". In addition to reprising his role from the previous film, Matthias Schweighöfer served as director. Shay Hatten returns to the franchise as screenwriter, from an original story co-written by Zack Snyder and Hatten. The plot centers around Schweighöfer's character and the earliest days of the zombie outbreak. Though the movie wouldn't feature many zombies, Deborah Snyder described the film as similar to The Italian Job in a world where zombies exist, while explaining that the film is standalone in nature. The producer officially classified the genre as a romantic-comedy heist film that canonically depicts the early stages of the zombie pandemic portrayed in the previous film; stating: "[it] takes place in a world where these zombies exist in America and it's causing instability in the banking institutions. They're moving money around, so it's the perfect opportunity for a heist." The plot would show how Schweighöfer's character, Ludwig Dieter, learned how to crack safes with previous heist teams. Schweighöfer acknowledged that while the movie isn't categorically a zombie film, the filmmaker teased that the undead may appear; while Snyder confirmed that there would be zombies in the film.

Principal photography took place in Germany and wrapped in December 2020. In April 2021, the film was officially titled Army of Thieves. In June 2021 on the first day of the Netflix online event "Geeked Week", Deborah Snyder stated that they were intending the movie be released in the fall. In July 2021, Snyder shared the first promotional stills from the movie via his social media page, and stated that the film would release "soon". Later that month, the first teaser poster was released with the caption "coming soon". The film would feature a time-slotted panel, during the 2021 Comic-Con@Home event. The first trailer was released during the panel. Army of Thieves was released on October 29, 2021.

== Cancelled projects ==
=== Planet of the Dead ===
In May 2021, Zack Snyder stated that he and Shay Hatten had the story for a sequel film planned. Snyder elaborated that should the project be green-lit, the plot would include the events teased at the end of Army of the Dead with Omari Hardwick's Vanderohe character becoming the new alpha zombie, and the perilous outbreak that follows when he arrives in Mexico. Snyder confirmed that Easter eggs were purposefully placed for world-building to be included in future installments of the franchise including a potential sequel; some of which include: the fact that Area 51's shipment of Zeus the alpha was being sent to Iran, time loops, robot zombies, as well as undead's abilities to breed. Snyder described the film as "insane". The film was officially confirmed to be in development in July 2021, when the Snyders signed a first-look deal with Netflix. Hatten and Snyder are co-writing the story, while production will begin following completion of Snyder's Rebel Moon film. In October 2021, the title was officially revealed to be Planet of the Dead. Snyder also revealed that Matthias Schweighöfer's character Ludwig Dieter would factor into the film, despite seemingly dying in the previous installment; while also confirming that a time loop will factor into the plot.

In October 2021, Zack Snyder and Matthias Schweighöfer both stated that the team of characters from Army of Thieves would return in the franchise. Snyder announced that there were plans for a sequel to Planet of the Dead, with additional spin-off projects also in development. Snyder later expressed interest in exploring additional plot for the character Rolph played by Guz Khan, while confirming potential for a prequel/spin-off from Army of Thieves. In November of the same year, Khan expressed interest in exploring where Rolph and Alexis "Brad Cage" Broschini (portrayed by Stuart Martin) are post-zombie apocalypse in events taking place after Army of the Dead.

=== Army of the Dead: Lost Vegas ===
In September 2020, an anime prequel-television series titled Army of the Dead: Lost Vegas, was announced to be in development as an exclusive streaming release for Netflix. Zack Snyder was to direct two of the episodes and serve as a co-executive producer on the project, while Jay Oliva was to serve as showrunner and one of the directors for the series. The series was to be a joint-venture production between The Stone Quarry, Stone Quarry Animation, Meduzarts Animation Studios, and Netflix Original Series.

The following month, Deborah Snyder, Wesley Coller, Jay Oliva, and Shay Hatten were named as additional executive producers. Zack Snyder later stated that production was slated to last until March 2022. In July 2021, Ana de la Reguera revealed that she had completed recording the lines for her role in the series. The series was scheduled to be released in the second quarter of 2023.

In November 2023, Snyder stated that at that point the television series had been cancelled. The filmmaker confirmed however, that much of the work on the series had been completed and that one day it might be released; even if it was in its current animatic pre-visualization form. During the same interview, Snyder stated that one scene would have featured the mercenary team stepping through a portal and interacting with intergalactic aliens. Some of these characters appear in the filmmaker's Rebel Moon franchise, which would have created connections between the two separate intellectual properties. In December of the same year however, the filmmaker revealed that work on the series had once again commenced while stating that the voice-over work of each actor was completed; he expressed hopes that it would be completed.

== Short films ==
Title	U.S. release date	Director	Screenwriter(s)	Story by	Producers
The Reckoning	May 16, 2021	Karla Braun	Zack Snyder		Zack Snyder, Wesley Coller & Deborah Snyder
Guzman of the Dead 420	June 4, 2021	Zack Snyder	Zack Snyder, Shay Hatten & Joby Harold	Zack Snyder	Zack Snyder, Wesley Coller & Deborah Snyder

=== The Reckoning (2021) ===
A short film, co-developed with Netflix and the Snyders, as a promotional advertisement for Army of the Dead. The short stars Forrest Griffin as a fictionalized version of himself, a police officer who discovers an illegal street fighting ring where people battle zombies. The short was created to add an underground fight club to the franchise, at Zack Snyder's request.

=== Guzman of the Dead 420 (2021) ===
A prequel short film released as a compilation of the in-universe YouTube videos, following the character Guzman as he hunts zombies. The short was released on June 4, 2021, exclusively on Netflix Film Club's YouTube channel.

== Main cast and characters ==
List indicators

This section includes characters who will appear or have appeared in the franchise in main roles.

- An empty grey cell indicates the character was not in the film, or that the character's official presence has not yet been confirmed.
- ^{P} indicates an appearance in onscreen photographs.
- ^{V} indicates a voice-only role.

Character	Films		Short films
Character	Army of the Dead	Army of Thieves	Short films
Scott Ward	Dave Bautista	Dave Bautista^{A}	
Kate Ward	Ella Purnell		
Maria Cruz	Ana de la Reguera	Ana de la Reguera^{A}	
Vanderohe	Omari Hardwick		
Marianne Peters	Tig Notaro		
Ludwig Dieter Sebastian Schlencht-Wöhnert	Matthias Schweighöfer	Matthias Schweighöfer Leonard Treyde^{Y}	
Michael "Mikey" Guzman	Raúl Castillo		Raúl Castillo
Chambers	Samantha Win		
Lily "The Coyote"	Nora Arnezeder		
Bly Tanaka	Hiroyuki Sanada	Hiroyuki Sanada^{P}	
Martin	Garret Dillahunt		
Burt Cummings	Theo Rossi		
Richards Zeus the King / Alpha Zombie	Richard Cetrone		
The Queen	Athena Perample		
Gwendoline Starr		Nathalie Emmanuel Nandi Sawyers-Hudson^{T} Jasmina Peña Milian^{Y}	
Korina Dominguez		Ruby O. Fee Violina Maria Rostami^{Y}	
Alexis "Brad Cage" Broschini		Stuart Martin David Dvorscík^{Y}	
Rolph		Guz Khan	
Delacroix		Jonathan Cohen	
Beatrix		Noémie Nakai	
Hans Wagner		Christian Steyer	
Forrest Griffin			Himself

== Additional crew and production details ==
Title	Crew/Detail					
Title	Composer(s)	Cinematographer	Editor	Production companies	Distributing company	Running time
Dawn of the Dead	Tyler Bates	Matthew F. Leonetti	Niven Howie	Toho-Towa Co. Ltd. Strike Entertainment; Metropolitan Filmexport; New Amsterdam Entertainment	Universal Pictures	100 min Unrated Director's Cut: 109 min
The Reckoning	Tom Holkenborg	Maz Makhani	Debbie Berman	UFC; Netflix; Scissor Films; The Stone Quarry; Lair TV Productions	YouTube	2 min
Army of the Dead	Tom Holkenborg	Zack Snyder	Dody Dorn	The Stone Quarry; Netflix Original Films	Netflix	148 min
Guzman of the Dead 420	Tom Holkenborg	Zack Snyder	Dody Dorn	The Stone Quarry; Netflix Original Films	Netflix Film Club YouTube	5 min
Army of Thieves	Hans Zimmer; Steve Mazzaro	Bernhard Jasper	Alexander Berner	Pantaleon Films; The Stone Quarry; Netflix Original Films	Netflix	127 min

== Reception ==
=== Critical and public response ===
Film	Critical		Public
Film	Rotten Tomatoes	Metacritic	CinemaScore
Dawn of the Dead	76% (195 reviews)	59 (37 reviews)	B
Army of the Dead	67% (288 reviews)	57 (43 reviews)	—N/a
Army of Thieves	68% (98 reviews)	49 (22 reviews)	—N/a

== In other media ==
=== Behind the scenes ===
- Creating An Army of the Dead: A 30-minute long documentary special on the making of Army of the Dead, which was released simultaneously alongside the film on Netflix. Zack Snyder and the creative team detail the movie's stunts, groundbreaking special effects and the film's intent to evolve the zombie genre. Though other Netflix Original making-of documentaries were eventually released on the streaming company's YouTube page, Creating an Army of the Dead was not and is only viewable in-full exclusively via the streaming service.
- How to Make Movies: Snyder School: A documentary-styled miniature web series released by Netflix Film Club on YouTube, where Zack Snyder discusses specific aspects of filmmaking and experiences in creating his movies. Details regarding the making of Army of the Dead are featured throughout the mini-series. The first episode details the making of the film's title sequences; the second details the art of cinematography; the third episode inspects film editing; and the last episode explores worldbuilding, the creation of mythology and lore in a fictional universe.
- Army of the Dead: A Film by Zack Snyder: The Making of the Film: A behind-the-scenes book, released on June 1, 2021, by Titan Books. There will also be a limited edition with additional content and Snyder's signature.

=== Netflix Dreams ===
- Army of the Dead: The Vader Cut: A short fan film, released as the third episode of the Netflix Dreams web-series, which premiered at the conclusion of the first day of Netflix "Geeked Week" as a tribute to the franchise. The episode features internet personality King Vader falling asleep while watching Army of the Dead, and dreaming of a zombie apocalypse. Upon awaking, Vader discovers that an undead outbreak has actually occurred while he and a group of friends fight to survive the ensuing events.

=== Games ===
- NFT of the Dead: A non-fungible token (NFT) puzzle-based game that ran from May 27–30 of 2021, after which a "Competition is Over" message screen loads. The object of the game was to pick the four locks of the Götterdämmerung vault, with the reward of a deleted scene from the film given to the winner. In that scene Mikey Guzman plays poker with skeletons. The scene was later shown in a video about the success of NFT of the Dead released by Agentur XY the ad company Netflix works with.
- Army of the Dead – Viva Las Vengeance: VR Experience: An immersive event developed in collaboration by Netflix, Pure Imagination Studios, Fever Labs Inc., and The Stone Quarry. A VR experience; the story takes place during the early stages of the zombie outbreak in Las Vegas, wherein players are tasked with saving civilians that have been trapped within the makeshift walls of a zombie-infested city. Ana de la Reguera filmed scenes, reprising her role as Maria Cruz from Army of the Dead.
- Army of the Dead: A Zombicide Game: In May 2021, it was announced that CMON Limited would release a standalone role-playing adventure board game within their Zombicide series, based on the Army of the Dead feature film. Players assume the roles of characters from the film, each with different abilities, and must work together (through scenes from the film, and events that took place "off-screen") to make it out alive and receive their payout. The board game release on July 19, 2024.

== Soundtracks ==
Dawn of the Dead: Official Motion Picture Soundtrack

An official soundtrack album of the film which was released by Milan Records in 2012, eight years after the movie's debut. Credited as the career-making moment for Bates, the physical album is considered a collector's item, while the score received praise from music critics. The album received digital, vinyl, and audio compact disc (CD) releases.

Army of the Dead: Music from the Netflix Film

The soundtrack composed by Thomas Holkenborg, which received critical acclaim from music critics, was released digitally in collaboration between Netflix and Milan Records in May 2021. A physical release from Netflix, Milan Records, and Waxwork Records on vinyl released in late-2021.

Army of Thieves: Soundtrack from the Netflix Film

The soundtrack was composed by Hans Zimmer and Steve Mazzaro, and was released digitally by Milan Records in November 2021.
