= A Jar Full of Life =

- Theatrical release poster
- Directed by: Florian Ross
- Written by: Finn Christoph Stroeks
- Produced by: Dan Maag; Matthias Schweighöfer; Marco Beckmann
- Starring: Jella Haase; Matthias Schweighöfer; Marc Benjamin
- Cinematography: Felix Novo de Oliveira
- Edited by: Hans Horn; Jan Pusch
- Music by: Jonas David; Rasmus Zschoch
- Production companies: Pantaleon Films; Warner Bros. Film Productions Germany; Traumfabrik Babelsberg; Erfttal Film & Fernsehproduktion
- Distributed by: Warner Bros. Pictures
- Release date: 8 March 2018
- Country: Germany
- Language: German
- Box office: $808,748

A Jar Full of Life (German: Vielmachglas) is a 2018 German comedy drama film directed by Florian Ross.

== Cast ==
- Jella Haase as Marleen Ruge
- Marc Benjamin as Ben
- Matthias Schweighöfer as Erik Ruge
- Juliane Köhler as Doris Ruge
- Uwe Ochsenknecht as Peter Ruge
- Emma Drogunova as Zoë
- Gerdy Zint as Aad
- Katy Karrenbauer as Rosa
- Lars Rudolph as Pontenagel
- Jasmin Lord as Kim
- Martina Eitner-Acheampong as Frau Krüger
- Ilka Bessin as Busfahrerin
- Gerda Böken as Gisela
- Gustav-Peter Wöhler as Antiquitätenhändler
- Gisa Flake as Ticketverkäuferin
- Adam Bousdoukos as Hotelbesitzer
