= Theresa Underberg =

German actress and radio play talker (born 1985)

Kira Theresa Beatrice Frederike Felicitas Cornelia Maria „Resi“ Underberg Underberg (born 6 May 1985 in Hamburg, West Germany) is a German actress and radio play talker.

Since 1994, she speaks for some popular radio plays. In 1999, she took over the voice of Anne in the German radio play version of Enid Blyton's The Famous Five (German title: Fünf Freunde). She continues her work on this series until today. On January 16, 2008 she joined the daytime soap opera Verbotene Liebe in the contract role as Lydia Brandner. Theresa played the role for three years and left the series when she decided to move back to her hometown Hamburg.

However Theresa continued her work as an actress and made her big screen debut with a role in the comedy What a Man, starring next to actor Matthias Schweighöfer. Followed by this was the pilot of the new hour long comedy series Es kommt noch dicker for Sat.1. After a guest appearance in SOKO Köln, Sat.1 gave Es kommt noch dicker a series order. The series premiered on 10 September 2012. From 2015 till 2017 she played the nurse Lizzy Riedmüller in Bettys Diagnose.

== Filmography ==
- Verbotene Liebe (2008–2011, TV series), as Lydia Brandner
- What a Man (2011), as Stine
- SOKO Köln: Ein Schuss, kein Tor (2012, TV series episode), as Frauke Papke
- Es kommt noch dicker (2012, TV series, 7 episodes), as Rike
- Tatort: Allmächtig (2013, TV series episode), as Sarah Möltner
- Bettys Diagnose (2015–2017, TV series, 48 episodes), as Lizzy Riedmüller

== Radio plays ==
- The Famous Five (1999–present), as Anne
- Three Investigators: Gefährliches Quiz (2003), as Clarissa
- Ein Fall für TKKG: Der Mörder aus einer anderen Zeit (2001), as Regina
- Ein Fall für TKKG: Der grausame Rächer (1995), as Regina
