= Auerhaus =

2019 German drama film

- Theatrical release poster
- Directed by: Neele Leana Vollmar
- Written by: Neele Leana Vollmar; Lars Hubrich
- Based on: Auerhaus by Bov Bjerg
- Produced by: Dan Maag; Marco Beckmann; Stephanie Schettler-Köhler
- Starring: Devrim Lingnau; Damian Hardung; Luna Wedler; Max von der Groeben
- Cinematography: Frank Lamm
- Edited by: Hansjörg Weißbrich; Ana de Mier y Ortuño
- Music by: Oliver Thiede
- Production companies: Pantaleon Film; Warner Bros. Film Productions Germany; Brainpool Pictures; WS Filmproduktion
- Distributed by: Warner Bros. Pictures
- Release date: 5 December 2019
- Running time: 104 minutes
- Country: Germany
- Language: German

Auerhaus is a 2019 German film written and directed by Neele Leana Vollmar, based on the 2015 novel by Bov Bjerg.

== Cast ==
- Devrim Lingnau as Cäcilia
- Damian Hardung as Höppner
- Luna Wedler as Vera
- Max von der Groeben as Frieder
- Ada Philine Stappenbeck as Pauline
- Piet Fuchs as Faller
- Sabine Holzlöhner as Eisverkäuferin
- Greta Hubert as Melanie
- Oliver Michael Jaksch as Bauer Seidel
- Hans Löw as Bogatzki
- Milan Peschel as F2M2
- Jürgen Rißmann as Bürgermeister
- Sven Schelker as Harry
- Anja Schneider as Mutter Höppner
- Christian Skibinski as Insasse
- Hendrik Voß as Junge bei der Musterung
