= 100 Things =

- Theatrical release poster
- Directed by: Florian David Fitz
- Written by: Florian David Fitz
- Produced by: Dan Maag; Matthias Schweighöfer; Marco Beckmann
- Starring: Florian David Fitz; Matthias Schweighöfer
- Cinematography: Bernhard Jasper
- Edited by: Denis Bachter
- Music by: Josef Bach; Arne Schumann
- Production companies: Pantaleon Films; Warner Bros. Film Productions Germany; Erfttal Film & Fernsehproduktion; WS Filmproduktion
- Distributed by: Warner Bros. Pictures
- Release date: 6 December 2018
- Running time: 106 minutes
- Country: Germany
- Language: German
- Box office: $14 million

100 Things (German: 100 Dinge) is a 2018 German comedy film written, directed and starring Florian David Fitz.

== Cast ==
- Florian David Fitz as Paul Konaske
- Matthias Schweighöfer as Toni Katz
- Miriam Stein as Lucy Denske
- Hannelore Elsner as Renate Konaske
- Wolfgang Stumph as Wolfgang Konaske
- Katharina Thalbach as Oma Konaske
- Johannes Allmayer as Ronnie
- Sarah Viktoria Frick as Betty
- Maximilian Meyer-Bretschneider as Maik
- Maria Furtwängler as Antonietta Kärcher
- Artjom Gilz as David Zuckerman
- Daniel Flieger as Herr Becht
- Nora Boeckler as Jutta
