= The Stone Quarry =

American film production company

The Stone Quarry Inc.
- Logo used since 2020
- Formerly: Cruel and Unusual Films, Inc. (2004–2019)
- Type: Film production company
- Industry: Cinema of the United States
- Founded: 2004; 22 years ago
- Founders: Zack Snyder; Deborah Snyder; Wesley Coller
- Headquarters: Pasadena, California, United States
- Key people: Zack Snyder (president/CEO/CFO/Partner); Deborah Snyder (CEO/CFO/Partner); Wesley Coller (CEO/CFO/Partner)
- Website: www.cruelfilms.com

The Stone Quarry Inc. (formerly Cruel and Unusual Films, Inc.) is an American production company established in 2004 by Deborah Snyder, her husband Zack Snyder and their producing partner Wesley Coller.

== Establishment ==
Cruel and Unusual Films, Inc. was founded in 2004 by Zack Snyder, his wife Deborah Snyder, and producing partner Wesley Coller. The company is based at Warner Bros., and is located in Pasadena, California. The company signed a two-year production deal with Warner Bros. in 2007, prior to the theatrical release of 300, a film in which Snyder served as director. Snyder and his wife, Deborah, are co-presidents of the company. Coller often serves as a producing partner. Snyder launched the company's official website on January 30, 2009, and invited artists to submit versions of the company logo. Apart from producing feature films, Cruel and Unusual Films has also assisted in the marketing of its films, based on the strong advertising backgrounds of Snyder and his wife, Deborah Snyder. By January 2019, Snyder announced the studio's new title, The Stone Quarry.

== Background ==
To date, Cruel and Unusual/The Stone Quarry has served as an uncredited co-producer for films in which Snyder and his wife served as director and producer respectively. Following its establishment in 2004, the company produced Dawn of the Dead, a remake of George A. Romero's 1978 film of the same name. In 2007, Cruel and Unusual Films produced 300, an adaptation of Frank Miller's graphic novel. In 2009, the company produced Watchmen, an adaptation of the DC Comics limited series of the same name. Cruel and Unusual next produced Legend of the Guardians: The Owls of Ga'Hoole, a computer-animated film based on the series of children's fantasy books Guardians of Ga'Hoole by Kathryn Lasky. Sucker Punch was co-written and directed by Snyder, who also produced the film with his wife Deborah Snyder. The film is the first that credits Cruel and Unusual as a producer. Sucker Punch was released on March 25, 2011.

In 2014 the studio co-produced the sequel to 2007's 300, 300: Rise of an Empire. In 2016 the studio co-produced the sequel to 2013's Man of Steel, Batman v Superman: Dawn of Justice.

In 2017 the studio co-produced Wonder Woman and Justice League.

In July 2015 it was revealed that Zack Snyder and Deborah Snyder will serve as producers and executive producers in the DC Extended Universe. Since 2018, DC Films chairmen Geoff Johns and Walter Hamada will serve as executive producer on the future DC movies set in the DC Extended Universe, along with the Snyders.

The studio was supposed to produce Army of the Dead, a sequel to Snyder's Dawn of the Dead remake, in which Zack Snyder was supposed to assist in developing the story, while his wife to produce the film, and Joby Harold to write the screenplay. The story centers around a father trying to save his daughter in a zombie-infested Las Vegas. Due to the expensive production value, the production of the movie was cancelled by Warner Bros.

In 2021, Netflix released a prequel of Army of the Dead, directed by Matthias Schweighöfer in addition to reprising his role as Ludwig. Shay Hatten also penned the screenplay. It was also announced that an anime prequel series was developed titled Army of the Dead: Lost Vegas. The series served as an origin story for Dave Bautista's character Scott Ward and his rescue team during the initial fall of Vegas as they confront the source of the zombie outbreak. Jay Oliva served as showrunner for the series, with both Oliva and Zack Snyder directing two episodes each. In July 2021, the company signed a first-look deal with Netflix.

The company also produced The Last Photograph, a film about a photograph that inspires two men to travel to South America. The film was directed by Zack Snyder and was produced by Snyder and his wife Deborah Snyder.

=== Future projects ===
Zack Snyder will also direct a remake of the 1969 film The Illustrated Man. In September 2017, it was confirmed that Zack Snyder is developing The Fountainhead adaptation, based on the 1943 novel from Ayn Rand.

== Productions ==
=== Films ===
Year	Film	Director	Co-production with	Distributed by	Rotten Tomatoes	Metacritic
As Cruel and Unusual Films
2004	Dawn of the Dead	Zack Snyder	Strike Entertainment / New Amsterdam Entertainment	Universal Pictures	76%	58/100
2007	300	Zack Snyder	Legendary Pictures / Virtual Studios / Atmosphere Pictures / Hollywood Gang Productions	Warner Bros. Pictures	61%	52/100
2008–2009	Watchmen: Motion Comic	Jake Strider Hughes	Animated short film series based on the DC comic book series Watchmen	Warner Premiere Digital	—	—
2009	Watchmen	Zack Snyder	Legendary Pictures / Lawrence Gordon Productions / DC Entertainment	Warner Bros. Pictures / Paramount Pictures	65%	56/100
2010	Legend of the Guardians: The Owls of Ga'Hoole	Zack Snyder	Village Roadshow Pictures / Animal Logic	Warner Bros. Pictures	52%	53/100
2011	Sucker Punch	Zack Snyder	Legendary Pictures	Warner Bros. Pictures	22%	33/100
2013	Man of Steel	Zack Snyder	DC Entertainment / Legendary Pictures / Syncopy / Peters Entertainment	Warner Bros. Pictures	56%	55/100
2014	300: Rise of an Empire	Noam Murro	Legendary Pictures / Atmosphere Pictures / Hollywood Gang Productions	Warner Bros. Pictures	45%	48/100
2016	Batman v Superman: Dawn of Justice	Zack Snyder	Atlas Entertainment	Warner Bros. Pictures	29%	44/100
2017	Wonder Woman	Patty Jenkins	Tencent Pictures / Wanda Pictures / Atlas Entertainment	Warner Bros. Pictures	93%	76/100
2017	Justice League	Zack Snyder	Atlas Entertainment	Warner Bros. Pictures	40%	45/100
As The Stone Quarry				Warner Bros. Pictures		
2020	Wonder Woman 1984	Patty Jenkins	Atlas Entertainment / DC Films	Warner Bros. Pictures	57%	60/100
2021	Zack Snyder's Justice League	Zack Snyder	Warner Bros. Pictures / Atlas Entertainment / DC Films	HBO Max	71%	54/100
2021	Army of the Dead	Zack Snyder	—	Netflix	67%	57/100
2021	Army of Thieves	Matthias Schweighöfer	Pantaleon Films	Netflix	69%	49/100
2023	Rebel Moon – Part One: A Child of Fire	Zack Snyder	Grand Electric	Netflix	22%	31/100
2024	Rebel Moon – Part Two: The Scargiver	Zack Snyder	Grand Electric	Netflix	16%	36/100
2026	The Last Photograph	Zack Snyder	Hollywood Gang Productions	TBA	16%	16/100
TBA	Escape from New York	Zack Snyder	StudioCanal / The Picture Company	TBA	TBA	TBA

=== Television ===
Year	Title	Creator(s) / Developer(s)	Network	Rotten Tomatoes	Metacritic
2024	Twilight of the Gods	Zack Snyder / Jay Oliva / Eric Carrasco	Netflix	76%	63/100

=== Video games ===
Year	Title	Developer(s)	Publisher	Platform(s)
2021	Army of the Dead: Viva Las Vengeance	Pure Imagination Studios	Netflix	Virtual reality
