= The Most Beautiful Day =

- Theatrical release poster
- Directed by: Florian David Fitz
- Written by: Florian David Fitz
- Produced by: Matthias Schweighöfer; Dan Maag; Marco Beckmann
- Starring: Matthias Schweighöfer; Florian David Fitz
- Cinematography: Bernhard Jasper
- Edited by: Stefan Essl
- Music by: Egon Riedel; Siggi Mueller
- Production companies: Pantaleon Films; Warner Bros. Film Productions Germany
- Distributed by: Warner Bros. Pictures
- Release date: 25 February 2016
- Running time: 113 minutes
- Country: Germany
- Language: German
- Box office: $16 million

The Most Beautiful Day (German: Der geilste Tag) is a 2016 German comedy film written and directed by Florian David Fitz. Fitz himself and the German actor Matthias Schweighöfer play the leading roles. The cinema release in Germany was on February 25, 2016.

== Plot ==
The anxious and well-behaved 33-year-old pianist Andi and his room neighbor Benno, who is 36 years old and has a criminal record, have nothing in common, except for one thing: They are both in a hospice, Andi because of pulmonary fibrosis, Benno due to a brain tumor and neither of them feels like waiting around for their death. Andi suffers from shortness of breath as a result of his disease and therefore is dependent on additional supply of oxygen, while Benno's tumor causes him to randomly and irregularly fall asleep.

One day, they get tired of waiting for their seemingly imminent, certain death and spontaneously run away from the hospice, steal 140,000 euros through credit fraud and take off to Mombasa. They go on a road trip with a camper to South Africa, where Benno's ex-girlfriend lives with their daughter Leni. All of that, they do with the intention of having the most beautiful day of their lives. Despite all the hardships and experiences they face, they find no satisfaction and are forced to ask themselves whether they might be actually looking for something completely different.

While Andi ultimately succumbs to his disease shortly after returning to Germany, Benno survives after finding out that he has been misdiagnosed due to an accidental exchange of medical records. He does not suffer from a brain tumor but from narcolepsy.

== Cast ==
- Matthias Schweighöfer - Andi
- Florian David Fitz - Benno
- Alexandra Maria Lara - Mona
- Rainer Bock - Dr. Wüst

== Success ==
The demand for the cinema tour around the release date of the movie was so great that additional halls had to be reserved a month before the film was released. After the pre-sale successes of the US blockbusters Fifty Shades of Grey and Star Wars: The Force Awakens, a German film has now also generated strong pre-sale numbers. The world premiere took place on February 23, 2016, in the Mathäser in Munich.

So far, the film has had over 1.7 million viewers in German cinemas and is in 16th place among all of the films released in 2016 (as of August 13, 2017).

== Awards ==
The German film and media rating (German: Deutsche Film- und Medienbewertung (FBW)) rated The Most Beautiful Day with the word “valuable”. As an explanation they say: „The movie is a tragic-comedy that takes on the dramaturgy of a road movie as the film progresses […]. The sensitive topic is told in a balanced way, accompanied by tragic and comic elements and provided with suitable music. One or two of the slapstick interludes could have been a little more reserved in the eyes of the jury. Several turning points ensured the viewers excitement and surprise.” Additionally, the main actors Fitz and Schweighöfer have been praised and said to carry the film well. The movie has been titled as a successful tragic-comedy.

In 2016, Florian David Fitz was awarded the Romy (an Austrian award for films) for The Most Beautiful Day in the category of best book cinematic film.
