= Joy of Fatherhood =

- Theatrical release poster
- Directed by: Matthias Schweighöfer
- Written by: Andrea Willson; Christian Lyra; Matthias Schweighöfer; Murmel Clausen; Sebastian Wehlings
- Produced by: Dan Maag; Max Wiedemann; Marco Beckmann; Matthias Schweighöfer; Quirin Berg
- Starring: Matthias Schweighöfer; Isabell Polak
- Cinematography: Bernhard Jasper
- Edited by: Stefan Essl
- Music by: Martin Todsharow
- Production companies: Pantaleon Films; Wiedemann & Berg Filmproduktion
- Distributed by: Warner Bros. Pictures
- Release date: 6 February 2014 (Germany)
- Running time: 110 minutes
- Country: Germany
- Language: German

Joy of Fatherhood (German: Vaterfreuden) is a 2014 German comedy film directed by Matthias Schweighöfer.

== Cast ==
- Matthias Schweighöfer - Felix
- Isabell Polak - Maren
- Friedrich Mücke - Henne
- Tom Beck - Ralph
- Natalia Belitski - Jessie
- Lina Hüesker - Leonie
- Moritz Grove - Tom
- Alexander Khuon - Norbert
- Katharina Schüttler - Betti
- Luise Bähr - Sybille
- Tim Sander - Frederic Sattelmeyer
- Detlev Buck - Dr. Parisius
- Susan Hoecke - Kara
