= Hot Dog (2018 film) =

- Theatrical release poster
- Directed by: Torsten Künstler
- Written by: Lo Malinke; Tripper Clancy
- Produced by: Dan Maag; Matthias Schweighöfer; Marco Beckmann
- Starring: Til Schweiger; Matthias Schweighöfer; Anne Schäfer; Lisa Tomaschewsky
- Cinematography: Markus Nestroy
- Edited by: Robert Kummer
- Music by: Martin Todsharow; Josef Bach; Arne Schumann
- Production companies: Pantaleon Films; Warner Bros. Film Productions Germany; Erfttal Film & Fernsehproduktion
- Distributed by: Warner Bros. Pictures
- Release date: 18 January 2018
- Running time: 105 minutes
- Country: Germany
- Language: German
- Box office: $4.8 million

Hot Dog is a 2018 German comedy film directed by Torsten Künstler, starring Til Schweiger, Matthias Schweighöfer, Anne Schäfer and Lisa Tomaschewsky.

It was released in Germany on 18 January 2018 by Warner Bros. Pictures.

== Cast ==
- Til Schweiger as Luke Steiner
- Matthias Schweighöfer as Theo Ransoff
- Anne Schäfer as Nicki Kasulke
- Lisa Tomaschewsky as Mascha Butkin
- Samuel Finzi as Fescu / Snake
- Tim Wilde as Reiners
- Heino Ferch as Hedmann
- André Hennicke as Herr Ransoff
- Ramona Kunze-Libnow as Frau Ransoff
- Ilka Bessin as Vera
- Manou Lubowski as Peter
- Paula Paul as Innenministerin
- Lilli Schweiger as Ella Steiner
- Merlin Rose as Benno
