= Manfred von Richthofen (disambiguation) =

Manfred von Richthofen was a fighter pilot with the German Air Force during World War I

Manfred von Richthofen may also refer to:

- Manfred von Richthofen (general), a German General der Kavallerie (General of the Cavalry) during World War I
- Manfred von Richthofen (sports official), a German hockey player and coach
- Manfred Albert von Richthofen, killed in a crime with the participation of his own daughter
