= Abikalypse =

- Theatrical release poster
- Directed by: Adolfo Kolmerer
- Written by: Tim Gondi
- Produced by: Dan Maag; Marco Beckmann; Stephanie Schettler-Köhler
- Starring: Reza Brojerdi; Lea van Acken; Lucas Reiber; Jerry Hoffmann
- Cinematography: Konstantin Freyer
- Edited by: Robert Hauser; William James
- Music by: Roman Fleischer
- Production companies: Pantaleon Films; Warner Bros. Film Productions Germany
- Distributed by: Warner Bros. Pictures
- Release date: 25 July 2019
- Running time: 99 minutes
- Country: Germany
- Language: German

Abikalypse is a 2019 German coming-of-age comedy film directed by Adolfo Kolmerer and written by Tim Gondi.

== Cast ==
- Reza Brojerdi as Musti
- Lea van Acken as Hannah
- Lucas Reiber as Tom
- Jerry Hoffmann as Yannick
- Lisa-Marie Koroll as Leonie
- Bianca Nawrath as Clara
- Alexander Gaida as Toni
- Leon Blaschke as Leon Blaschke
- Mehmet Kurtuluş as Mustis Vater
- Oliver Korittke as Hausmeister Hasselmann
