= Highway to Hellas =

Highway To Hellas
- Theatrical release poster
- Directed by: Aron Lehmann
- Written by: Arnd Schimkat; Moses Wolff; Aron Lehmann
- Produced by: Dan Maag; Matthias Schweighöfer; Marco Beckmann
- Starring: Christoph Maria Herbst; Adam Bousdoukos
- Cinematography: Nikolaus Summerer
- Edited by: Simon Gstöttmayr
- Music by: Boris Bojadzhiev
- Production companies: Pantaleon Films; Warner Bros. Film Productions Germany; Arri Film & TV Services
- Distributed by: Warner Bros. Pictures
- Release date: 26 November 2015
- Country: Germany
- Language: German
- Budget: 99 minutes
- Box office: $811,296

Highway To Hellas is a 2015 German comedy film directed by Aron Lehmann and produced by Dan Maag, Matthias Schweighöfer and Marco Beckmann.

== Cast ==
- Christoph Maria Herbst as Jörg Geissner
- Adam Bousdoukos as Panos
- Akilas Karazisis as Spyros
- Kleopatra Markou as Maria
- Georgia Tsangkaraki as Eleni
- Christos Valavanidis as Ilias
- Jorgos Kotanidis as Stavros
- Rosalie Thomass as Brigitte
- Eva Bay as Steffi
- Erricos Litsis as Dr. Yannis
- Gitta Schweighöfer as Dr. Laichinger
- Jennifer Mulinde-Schmid as Selina
