= The Manny =

- Theatrical release poster
- German: Der Nanny
- Directed by: Matthias Schweighöfer
- Written by: Matthias Schweighöfer; Murmel Clausen; Finn Christoph Stroeks; Lucy Astner
- Produced by: Marco Beckmann; Dan Maag; Matthias Schweighöfer
- Starring: Matthias Schweighöfer; Milan Peschel; Paula Hartmann; Arved Friese
- Cinematography: Bernhard Jasper
- Edited by: Zaz Montana
- Music by: Josef Bach; Tina Pepper; Arne Schumann
- Production companies: Pantaleon Films; Warner Bros. Film Productions Germany; Erfttal Film- und Fernsehproduktion; ARRI Productions; Pantaleon Entertainment
- Distributed by: Warner Bros. Pictures
- Release date: 26 March 2015 (Germany)
- Country: Germany
- Language: German
- Box office: $14.1 million (Germany)

The Manny (German: Der Nanny) is a 2015 German comedy film directed and co-written by Matthias Schweighöfer, starring himself as a greedy and super-busy real-estate developer, and Milan Peschel as a victim of his development who accidentally ends up babysitting his two children.

== Plot ==
Single father Clemens (Matthias Schweighöfer) is shunned by all nanny services because his two children Winnie and Theo (Paula Hartmann and Arved Friese) are impossible to babysit: they prank, bully and terrify any lady who dares to enter their mansion. But finding a nanny is hardly Clemens' number one priority, being preoccupied by his urban development which requires the demolition of an apartment building, something bitterly opposed by its residents. One of the victims, Rolf (Milan Peschel), pays Clemens a visit to voice his protest, but is mistaken as the new nanny — or manny in his case. Rolf believes it a good opportunity to sabotage Clemens' development plans, and accepts the offer. Predictably he suffers at the hands of the unruly children, but over time wins their hearts with his goofiness and sincerity. He discovers that the root of the kids' problems is that Clemens is never home. To help bring the family together, Rolf tries to show Clemens — including taking Clemens to visit his small community — that there are things more important than money in the world.

== Cast ==
- Matthias Schweighöfer as Clemens Klina
- Milan Peschel as Rolf Horst
- Paula Hartmann as Winnie Klina
- Arved Friese as Theo Klina
- Joko Winterscheidt as August
- Andrea Osvárt as Helen Nielsen
- Friedrich Liechtenstein as Keiler
- Tim Sander as Manni
- Shane Connor as Dad
