= The Red Baron (2008 film) =

2008 film by Nikolai Müllerschön

- Theatrical release poster
- Directed by: Nikolai Müllerschön
- Written by: Nikolai Müllerschön
- Produced by: Dan Maag; Thomas Reisser; Roland Pellegrino
- Starring: Matthias Schweighöfer; Joseph Fiennes; Til Schweiger; Lena Headey
- Cinematography: Klaus Merkel
- Edited by: Christian Lonk
- Music by: Stefan Hansen; Dirk Reichardt
- Production company: Niama Film
- Distributed by: Warner Bros. Pictures
- Release date: 10 April 2008 (Germany)
- Running time: 123 minutes
- Country: Germany
- Languages: English; German; French
- Budget: €18 million

The Red Baron (German: Der Rote Baron) is a 2008 German biographical action war film written and directed by Nikolai Müllerschön about the World War I flying ace Manfred von Richthofen, known as the "Red Baron". The film stars Matthias Schweighöfer, Joseph Fiennes, Til Schweiger and Lena Headey. The Red Baron was filmed entirely in English to improve its international commercial viability. The film was a box office failure and received widely negative reviews from critics, who criticized the performances, dialogue, and historical inaccuracies, but praised the visual effects, action sequences and musical score.

== Plot ==
In 1916, young aristocrat Manfred von Richthofen is serving as a pilot with the Imperial German Air Service on the Western Front. After dropping a wreath over the funeral of an Allied pilot, Richthofen and his fellow pilots Werner Voss and Jewish Friedrich Sternberg encounter a squadron of the Royal Flying Corps led by Captain Lanoe Hawker. Richthofen shoots down Canadian pilot Arthur Roy Brown. He later pulls Brown out of his downed aircraft, with assistance from Nurse Käte Otersdorf.

After a dogfight in which he kills Hawker, Richthofen is awarded the Pour le Mérite and promoted to command a squadron. He's joined by his brother Lothar von Richthofen and paints his plane bright red. His squadron becomes the "flying circus". He orders his men to avoid killing enemy pilots unless absolutely necessary and is dismayed when Lothar kills a British pilot attempting to land and surrender. Richthofen again dogfights Captain Brown in the air. Both are forced to land their aircraft, and they share a friendly drink as Brown explains he escaped from a German prisoner of war camp. Brown expresses hope they won't meet again until after the war, and he departs, telling Richthofen that Käte expressed feelings for him.

Richthofen learn that Sternberg was shot down and killed and broods in isolation for several days. Lothar reminds him that "A leader cannot afford to mourn." Returning to the skies, Richthofen is injured, and is nursed by Käte. As he recovers, the two share a romantic dinner and a dance. After Richthofen expresses gratitude for his wound keeping him out of the fighting, an angry Käte shows him the horrors of a field hospital, berating him for regarding the war as a game. During an Allied bombing raid on the base, Richtofen orders Käte to hide in the cellar and orders his planes into the air. Richthofen's head wound reopens, making him disoriented, and upon witnessing the death of his protege Kurt Wolff, he goes into a state of rage.

During another visit, Richthofen informs Käte that he has been offered a rear echelon position in command of the entire Air Service. Käte is overjoyed, but a reticent Richthofen conceals his doubts. Richthofen sees he is being manipulated by the Kaiser and his generals. While visiting the Fokker Industries, Richtofen discovers that his close friend and competitor Voss has been killed in action, leaving Richthofen the sole survivor of the squadron's original members. On the eve of the Spring Offensive, he tells Field Marshal Paul von Hindenburg the war is unwinnable. Hindenburg orders the disillusioned Richtofen back to his squadron.

After Richthofen leads his squadron into action in support of the offensive, Käte confronts him, demanding to know why he's still flying combat. Richthofen replies he can't betray the soldiers in the field and must remain "the immortal god that Berlin wants me to be." She spends the night with him, and the next morning Richthofen is wakened with the report of an approaching British aircraft formation. He briefs his pilots and, along with Lothar, advises his newly arrived and inexperienced cousin Wolfram von Richthofen against putting himself in unnecessary danger. Richthofen exchanges a sad smile with Käte from the cockpit, and takes off on his final mission. Two weeks later, Käte crosses over to Allied lines with Brown's assistance and visits Richthofen's grave. She apologizes for not coming sooner and expresses remorse for never telling him how much she loved him.

== Cast ==
In credits order.

- Matthias Schweighöfer as Rittmeister Manfred Freiherr von Richthofen
- Lena Headey as Nurse Käte Otersdorf
- Til Schweiger as Leutnant Werner Voss
- Volker Bruch as Oberleutnant Lothar Freiherr von Richthofen
- Maxim Mehmet as Leutnant Friedrich Sternberg
- Hanno Koffler as Leutnant Lehmann
- Tino Mewes as Oberleutnant Kurt Wolff
- Steffen Schroeder as Oberleutnant Karl Bodenschatz
- Axel Prahl as General der Kavallerie Ernst von Hoeppner
- Joseph Fiennes as "Captain" Roy Brown "RCFC"
- Tomáš Koutník as Young Manfred von Richthofen
- Tomáš Ibl as Young Lothar von Richthofen
- Albert Franc as Young Wolfram Freiherr von Richthofen
- Richard Krajčo as Major Lanoe Hawker VC RFC
- Lukáš Příkazký as Oberleutnant Stefan Kirmaier
- Gitta Schweighöfer as Kunigunde von Richthofen
- Branislav Holiček as Leutnant Wolfram Freiherr von Richthofen
- Julie Engelbrecht as Ilse von Richthofen
- Jan Vlasák as Major Albrecht Freiherr von Richthofen
- Luise Bähr as Sophie
- Irena Máchová as Clara
- Robert Nebřenský as Feldwebel Räuber
- Ralph Misske as Menzke
- Josef Vinklář as Generalfeldmarschall Paul von Hindenburg
- Ladislav Frej as Kaiser Wilhelm II
- Patrik Plesinger as Hauptmann Doering
- Jiří Laštovka as Oberleutnant Ernst Udet
- Rostislav Novák as Oberleutnant Erich Loewenhardt
- Zdeněk Pecha as Leutnant Werner Steinhäuser
- Jiří Kout as Leutnant Eberhard Mohnicke
- Karsten Kaie as Anthony Fokker

== Production ==
A shooting schedule from 10 July 2006 to 3 October 2006 took place in the Czech Republic at Prague and surrounding areas as well as locations in France and Baden-Württemberg, Germany. In Postproduction, CGI was carried out by PIXOMONDO.

To improve its chances on the international market, The Red Baron was filmed by Niama Film in the English language, although it is a German production depicting Germans. With an estimated budget of 18 million euros, it is one of the most expensive films in German history; (Note: The financing for The Red Baron came exclusively from well-to-do private individuals living in the state of Baden-Württemberg and was raised by the Stuttgart-based film financing with the production house Niama Film, which was established by director Nikolai Müllerschön with partners Thomas Reisser, Roland Pellegrino and Dan Maag.) grossing 1.6 million euros, less than 1/10 of its budget, it is at the same time one of its worst financial disasters.

Fewer than 100,000 saw the film in the first week, causing the film to miss the Top 3. In the second week it dropped to No. 10. In the third week the film was gone from the top ten.

== Historical accuracy ==
Director Nikolai Müllerschön said that a "meticulous reconstruction of the Baron's life and the historical setting was not uppermost in mind, that didn't interest me so much. It is more important to see what is relevant for people today. I saw no sense in making the film like a well-researched documentary. However, during my preparation on the film and looking into the story of his life, the man seems to be more like how I thought he should be."

Manfred von Richthofen, a namesake nephew, said "It's a remarkable movie". "Somehow it did not turn into a war film. The personality and especially the thoughtfulness of my uncle are true to life." Two scenes in the film, where Richthofen expresses to his sister, about his friends in photographs all being dead and Richthofen expressing his dismay to Emperor Wilhelm about the death of his victims are based on two accounts of Richthofen's changed altitude towards the war.

Many reviewers criticizied in particular the high level of historical inaccuracy. Roy Brown is depicted being shot down by Richthofen in 1916 and subsequently escaping from a German Prisoner of War camp. In 1917, Brown and Richthofen are forced to land their aircraft in no man's land, where they share a friendly drink. In 1918, after Richthofen's death, Brown assists Richthofen's love interest, Käte Otersdorf, in crossing into allied lines to visit his grave. Brown is described as being in the "RCFC". In reality, Canadian aviator Roy Brown was a flight commander in the Royal Naval Air Service. The fictitious love story between Richthofen and Käte Otersdorf was described as having little factual basis. Richthofen biographer Joachim Castan, called Richthofen's and Otersdorf's affair "complete rubbish"; "The historical Richthofen was the James Dean of World War I, an idol of his time, but he had no affairs with women. He also did not drink and did not visit brothels." And it is true that on three occasions he waved his enemy to the ground rather than shooting them out of the sky. (In one case, seeing that an enemy pilot's gun had jammed, Von Richthofen waved him down to the ground, jumped out, shook his hand and then took off again.) But in other respects, Von Richthofen was "cold-blooded," says Castan. "He was mainly interested in his strike rate. He did not try to conceal the fact that he was aiming to kill." Later research found that Nurse Kate was named Nurse Käte Oltersdorf (1891–1988). During one of his brief visits from hospital to Jagdgeschwader 1, Richthofen was accompanied by Oltersdorf. Bodenschatz recalled that Oltersdorf "paid little notice that the Rittmeister grimaced. Showing up at an aviation facility with a nurse was not at all to his liking...(she) declared sternly that if the Rittmeister should try to make any mischief with his head still not completely healed, she would be there." Richthofen wrote his dedication to duty and country kept him from pursuing any romantic pursuits. Richthofen's mother later stated after her son's death that Richthofen had a secret love that he planned to marry after the war. Oltersdorf's family would later claim that Richthofen and Oltersdorf was planning to marry after the war and that Oltersdorf was distraught by his death. Friedrich Sternberg is a composite character.

== Reception ==
The Red Baron premiered on 31 March 2008 in Berlin and was released a week later in the German cinemas but was quite controversial in Germany, where glorification of war heroes has become taboo. The reviews after the first public performances of the film were mainly negative. The film received a cool reception at the Berlin premiere and one member of the audience stated that Richthofen's disillusion with the war was not believable.

Elizabeth Hughes Belzil gave the film two out of five, criticizing its "rushed and plodding" pace and decisions done with the story. Peter Bradshaw gave the film two out of five stars, panning the story and characters.

Both Tino Mewes as Best Young Supporting Actor and Matthias Schweighöfer as Best Young Actor from The Red Baron were nominated for Undine Awards.

== See also ==
- Flyboys (film)
- Von Richthofen and Brown
