= Resistance (2020 film) =

2020 film directed by Jonathan Jakubowicz

- Theatrical release poster
- Directed by: Jonathan Jakubowicz
- Screenplay by: Jonathan Jakubowicz
- Produced by: Claudine Jakubowicz; Dan Maag; Thorsten Schumacher; Carlos García de Paredes; Patrick Zorer; Jonathan Jakubowicz
- Starring: Jesse Eisenberg; Clémence Poésy; Matthias Schweighöfer; Félix Moati; Géza Röhrig; Karl Markovics; Vica Kerekes; Bella Ramsey; Ed Harris; Édgar Ramírez; Alicia von Rittberg
- Cinematography: M.I. Littin-Menz
- Edited by: Alexander Berner
- Music by: Angelo Milli
- Production companies: Panteleon Films; Epicentral Studios; Rocket Science; Vertical Media; Ingenious Media; Neptune Features; Bliss Media
- Distributed by: IFC Films (United States); Warner Bros. Pictures (Germany)
- Release dates: March 8, 2020 (Miami Film Festival); March 27, 2020 (United States); October 14, 2021 (Germany)
- Running time: 120 minutes
- Countries: United States; United Kingdom; Germany
- Language: English
- Box office: $449,753

Resistance is a 2020 biographical drama film written and directed by Jonathan Jakubowicz, inspired by the life of Marcel Marceau. It stars Jesse Eisenberg as Marceau, with Clémence Poésy, Matthias Schweighöfer, Alicia von Rittberg, Félix Moati, Géza Röhrig, Karl Markovics, Vica Kerekes, Bella Ramsey, Ed Harris and Édgar Ramírez.

It was released in the United States on March 27, 2020, by IFC Films. Due to the COVID-19 pandemic, only a few independent and drive-in theaters remained open, and so Resistance topped the weekend box office in its opening weekend by earning $2,490 on one screen.

== Plot ==
The film opens in 1938, in Berlin, Nazi Germany. Nazi Brown Shirts invade the home of a young Jewish girl, Elsbeth, and kill her parents.

In Strasbourg, France, 1939, a young Marcel Marceau works unfulfilled in his father's butcher shop. Despite growing Nazi power threats beyond Germany, he is disconnected from their atrocities, and is instead eager to pursue the arts, especially mime and painting. He performs impressions of Charlie Chaplin (the visual similarities between Chaplin and Adolf Hitler — especially the toothbrush moustache — are a recurring motif) at his local cabaret, much to his father's disapproval. He admires a local girl, Emma, and hopes to marry her.

Marcel's cousin, Georges, involves himself with Jews preparing for the likelihood of German invasion. Georges and Emma bring a Scout troop of 123 Jewish orphans to Strasbourg, where they take up residence in a local castle. Initially terrified and withdrawn, the children soon adapt to their new situation, aided by the comic talents of Marceau. His bond with Emma deepens, and they fall in love.

After Germany's invasion of Poland in autumn 1939, the French Government looks to move populations away from border regions like Strasbourg. Following the German occupation of France, Marcel and Emma become heavily involved with Jewish Resistance. The Jewish children are distributed in smaller groups within the community to minimise their visibility; some are sent to local churches, and others to Jewish families. Marcel and Emma maintain contact with Elsbeth.

After 1941, Marceau's story intertwines with the menacing Klaus Barbie, who arrives in Lyon in 1942 during the Nazi occupation of southern France. His aim is to eliminate the Resistance, a mission that he conducts ruthlessly by bribing collaborators and conducting brutal executions in an empty swimming pool at Gestapo Headquarters. Later, Barbie gains notoriety as "The Butcher of Lyon".

Marcel and Emma also move to Lyon to continue their work with the Resistance, along with Marcel's brother Alain, and Emma's sister Mila. Alain narrowly evades capture during a Nazi sweep of Lyon's train station, and Marcel helps him escape by burning a German soldier. Emma and Mila are less fortunate. Captured during a subsequent Gestapo roundup, Barbie tortures Mila to death while extracting information from Emma about the Resistance. Emma survives by collaboration, but later attempts suicide. Marceau saves her, and they resolve to help Jewish children escape to Switzerland.

Pretending their Scout troop is on a hiking trip, Marcel, Emma, and Alain escort a dozen children, including Elsbeth, to the French Alps by SNCF train. Barbie and his SS troops patrol the last station before the Franco-Swiss border, forcing the petrified Emma into hiding as they search the train. Despite his intense questioning of Marcel, who poses as a collaborator, Barbie fails both to discover Emma and the group's true ambition to reach Switzerland. Relieved, Marcel, Emma, and the children continue their journey towards the border.

Meanwhile, Barbie's SS learn from a tortured priest that the children are indeed escaping Jews. Barbie, angry at his mistake, mobilises SS troops to pursue the group into the icy forests of the Swiss border. Barbie gets close enough to discharge his handgun, mortally wounding Emma, but cannot prevent their escape. Marcel is devastated at Emma's death, but he and the children reach Switzerland.

The film closes in 1945 at Nuremberg, Germany. Marceau is now a Liaison Officer with the United States Army, continuing his work as an actor and entertaining troops of the American occupation of Germany. Introduced by General George S. Patton, troops learn that Marceau crossed the Alps many times to save hundreds of children, mostly orphans, and indirectly saved thousands more children. The film closes with an evocative mime by Marceau in his famous white face and blue and white shirt.

== Cast ==
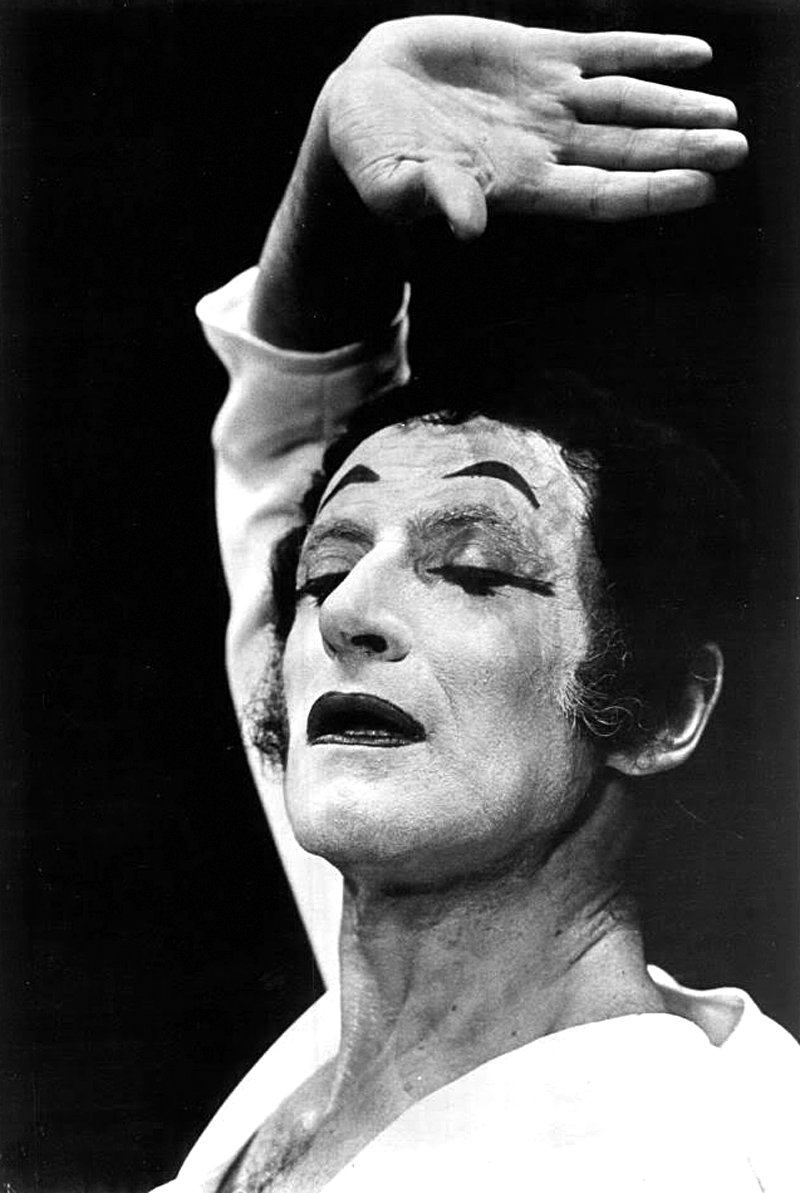
Marcel Marceau in 1971

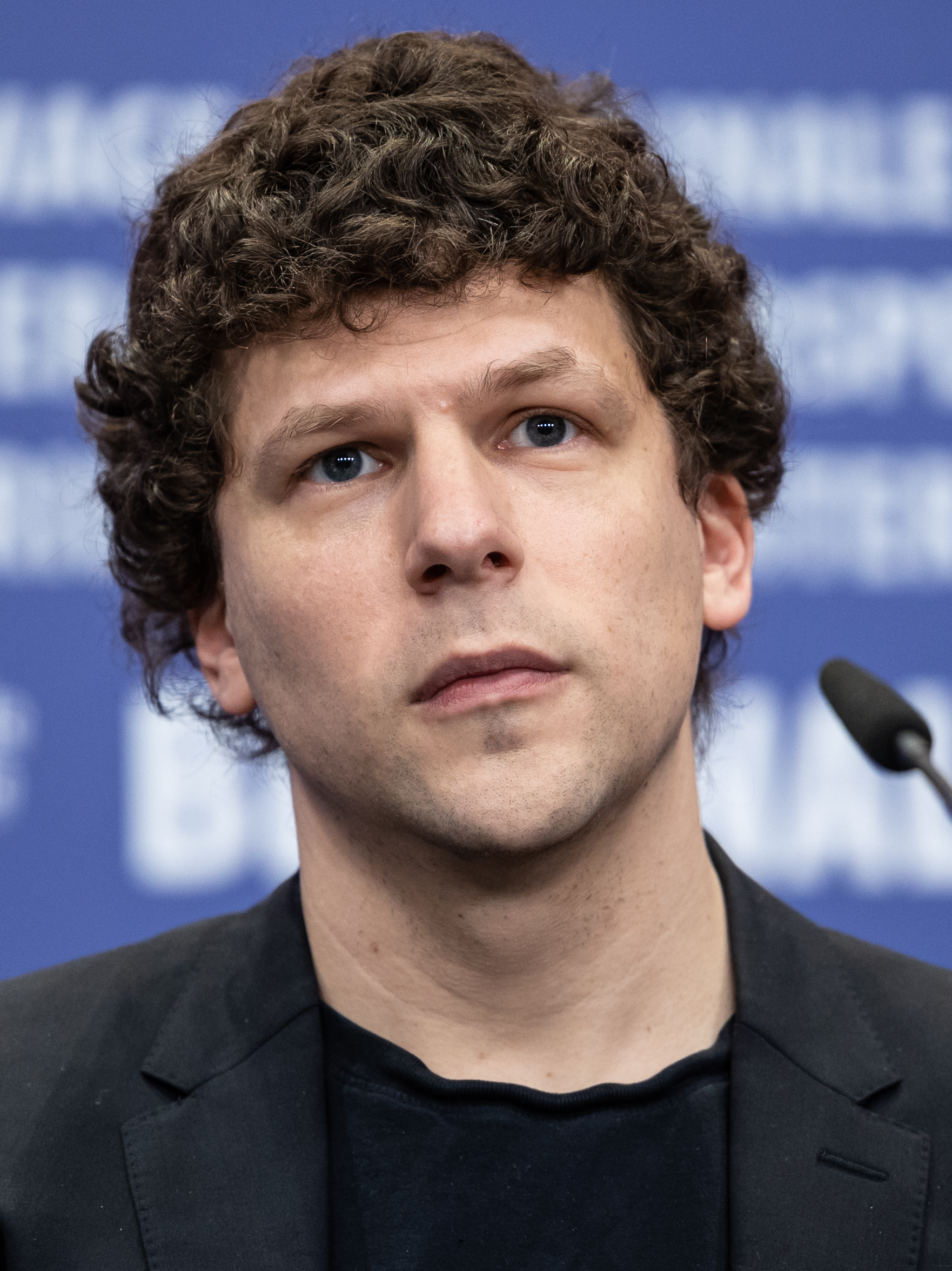
Jesse Eisenberg portrays Marceau in Resistance.

- Jesse Eisenberg as Marcel Marceau, an aspiring mime artist who fought for the French Jewish Resistance
  - Kue Lawrence as young Marcel
- Clémence Poésy as Emma
- Félix Moati as Alain Mangel, Marcel's brother, a guard at the French-German border crossing not far from the city of Strasbourg.
- Vica Kerekes as Mila
- Matthias Schweighöfer as Klaus Barbie, a ruthless Gestapo agent
- Géza Röhrig as Georges Loinger, Marceau's cousin and member of the French Jewish Resistance
- Ed Harris as George S. Patton, US Army general and commander of the 7th Army
- Bella Ramsey as Elsbeth
- Martha Issová as Flora
- Karl Markovics as Charles Mangel
- Arndt Schwering-Sohnrey as Max Rheinemert
- Alex Fondja as Frederique
- Aurélie Bancilhon as Dominique
- Alicia von Rittberg as Regine
- Louise Morell as Marcel's Mother
- Wolfgang Ceczor as Old Man on Train
- Philip Lenkowsky as Father Montluc
- Édgar Ramírez as Sigmund (Elsbeth's Father)
- Klára Issová as Judith (Elsbeth's Mother)
- Dimitri Storoge as Vichy Officer
- Felicity Montagu as Mrs. Garner (Emma's Mother)
- Werner Biermeier as Swiss Hunter
- Maxim Boubin as Joseph on the Tree
- Tobias Gareth Elman as Older Joseph

== Production ==
In May 2017, it was announced that Jesse Eisenberg had joined the cast of the film, portraying the role of Marcel Marceau, during his days as a member of the French Resistance, with Jonathan Jakubowicz directing from a screenplay he wrote. In February 2018, it was announced Haley Bennett and Matthias Schweighöfer had joined the cast of the film, with Warner Bros. Pictures distributing in Germany. In November 2018, Ed Harris, Edgar Ramirez, Clémence Poésy, Bella Ramsey, Géza Röhrig, Karl Markovics and Félix Moati joined the cast of the film, with Poésy replacing Bennett.

An important part of Jesse Eisenberg's preparation for the role of Marcel Marceau was learning mime. He trained for several months with mime artist, movement coach, and mime coach Lorin Eric Salm, who had studied with Marceau at his Paris school and is a historian of Marceau's work. Salm also choreographed the mime scenes for the film, creating original mime pieces based on Marceau's technique and style.

== Release ==
Rocket Science handled international distribution rights. In November 2019, IFC Films acquired distribution rights to the film. It was released on March 27, 2020. The film was set to have a theatrical release, however due to the COVID-19 pandemic IFC released the film on video on demand instead. It was tied for the highest-grossing film in America when it debuted in the week of April 17, 2020, grossing $2,490.

== Critical reception ==
On review aggregator website Rotten Tomatoes, the film holds an approval rating of 56% based on 94 reviews, with an average of 5.7/10. The site's critical consensus reads: "Flawed yet honorable, Resistance pushes past uneven performances and execution to pay sincere tribute to its real-life protagonist." On Metacritic, the film has a weighted average score of 53 out of 100, based on 19 critics, indicating "mixed or average reviews".

John DeFore of The Hollywood Reporter gave the film a positive review, calling it an "involving if imperfect look at humanism amidst atrocity." Peter Travers of Rolling Stone also gave the film a positive review, writing: "Playing the iconic mime Marcel Marceau in his early days as a French Resistance fighter for Jewish children, Eisenberg acts with physical finesse and deep feeling, proving that the power of art can literally be a saving grace." Michael Nordine of TheWrap praised Eisenberg's performance writing: "His best work comes at the mime's first real public performance, where he dons the white makeup and silently mimes his way through the war itself: Without a single word, he articulates the film's point more movingly than any monologue ever could."

David Ehrlich of IndieWire gave the film a negative review writing: "Resistance can't stop finding new reasons to ignore its protagonist, or flatten him into anonymity, Eisenberg's performance is the giddy standout of a bizarre and half-baked Holocaust thriller that's otherwise absent any sense of self". Jeannette Catsoulis of The New York Times also gave the film a negative review, saying that "Resistance feels disjointed and dated."
