= What a Man (2011 film) =

- Theatrical poster
- Directed by: Matthias Schweighöfer
- Written by: Doron Wisotzky; Matthias Schweighöfer
- Produced by: Marco Beckmann; Dan Maag; Matthias Schweighöfer; Gabriela Bacher
- Starring: Matthias Schweighöfer; Sibel Kekilli
- Cinematography: Frank Griebe
- Edited by: Mathilde Bonnefoy
- Production companies: Fox International Productions; Pantaleon Films
- Distributed by: 20th Century Fox
- Release date: 25 August 2011
- Running time: 94 minutes
- Country: Germany
- Language: German
- Box office: $17.3 million

What a Man is a 2011 German comedy film directed and starring Matthias Schweighöfer in his directorial debut. It was well received by German critics and also a success at the box office. It received US$17.3 million at the box office.

== Plot ==
30-year-old elementary school teacher Alex discovers that his girlfriend Carolin has an affair with their neighbour, photographer Jens, and is forced to move out of their shared flat. He moves in with his friend, animal welfare activist Nele who has a long-distance-relationship with her French boyfriend Etienne who lives in China. Alex tries to find out why his relationship with Carolin failed and what actually constitutes a man. Meanwhile, he and Nele who were in love with each other since primary school fall in love again.

== Cast ==
- Matthias Schweighöfer as Alexander
- Sibel Kekilli as Nele
- Elyas M'Barek as Okke
- Mavie Hörbiger as Carolin
- Milan Peschel as Volker
- Thomas Kretschmann as Jens
- Lilay Huser as Okke's Grandma
- Nora Jokhosha as Laura
- Theresa Underberg as Stine
- Joel Federico Laczlò Wüstenberg as Alexander's student
- Gitta Schweighöfer as Ms. Schlupp
- Friedrich Mücke as Doctor
- Katharina Schüttler as Mrs. at Checkin
- Pasquale Aleardi as Etienne
- Nora Tschirner Lady in the Panda-Costume
- Paul Alhäuser
- Andreas Nowak
- Patrick Sass as Barkeeper

== Reception in the United States ==
Aaron Coleman of Backstage found "copying its American counterparts" made the film "warmly endearing".
Farran Smith Nehme of the New York Post felt the plot was predictable and added "even the camera work is predictable".
Calhoun Kersten of www.filmmonthly.com called this film "so disarmingly charming that its faults don't stop it from being an incredibly enjoyable film", no matter whether "you feel like you’ve seen it all before".
Frank Scheck of The Hollywood Reporter judged that despite "its slavish adherence to familiar genre conventions" the film provided "reasonably fun viewing" because of its "off-kilter humor" and the "chemistry exhibited by Schweighofer and Kekilli".
Sandrine Sahakians of www.filmequals.com recommended the film to "anyone looking to put a smile on their faces".
Andy Webster of the New York Times conceded What a Man possibly quoted some well-known patterns but added "its sureness of tone" made Schweighöfer "a talent to watch".
