= Deborah Snyder =

American film producer

- Snyder in 2026
- Born: Deborah Johnson; March 13, 1969 (age 57); Edison, New Jersey, U.S.
- Occupation: Film producer
- Years active: 1990s–present
- Spouse: Zack Snyder (m. 2004)
- Children: 2 (adopted)

Deborah Snyder (née Johnson, born March 13, 1969) is an American producer of feature films and television commercials. She is married to filmmaker Zack Snyder, and has worked as his frequent producing partner on films such as Watchmen and 300. She is the co-founder of the production company The Stone Quarry.

== Personal life ==
Deborah Snyder is married to filmmaker Zack Snyder. The couple first met in 1996, and married on September 25, 2004, at the St. Bartholomew's Episcopal Church in Manhattan, New York. They currently reside in Pasadena, California. They have adopted two children together, and Snyder is the stepmother to six children from his previous relationships.

She graduated from Ithaca College in 1991.

== Career ==
Prior to her career as a film producer, Snyder worked at the New York advertising agency Backer Spielvogel Bates. In 1996, she hired Zack Snyder to direct a commercial for Reebok, hoping to create a commercial with a cinematic feel. At the time, she was dating the art director of the commercial, while Zack Snyder was married. In 1997, Snyder served as producer for the television documentary Talk to Me: Americans in Conversation. In 2002, she hired Zack Snyder to direct a commercial for Soft and Dry deodorant in New Zealand. The couple began dating at the end of filming. In 2004, the couple became the co-founders of Cruel and Unusual Films alongside their producing partner Wesley Coller.

In 2007, Snyder served as an executive producer for Zack Snyder's 2007 film 300, an adaptation of Frank Miller's same-titled graphic novel. She also produced the 2009 film adaptation of the graphic novel Watchmen. Snyder served as an executive producer for the 2010 animated film Legend of the Guardians: The Owls of Ga'Hoole, which is based on Guardians of Ga'Hoole, a series of children's fantasy books by Kathryn Lasky. The film was released in September 2010. Snyder next produced Sucker Punch, which was co-written, co-produced, and directed by her husband. The film was the first to credit their company Cruel and Unusual Films as a co-producer. Sucker Punch was released theatrically on March 25, 2011.

Snyder produced, alongside Christopher Nolan and Emma Thomas, the Superman reboot Man of Steel, which Zack Snyder directed. She will also produce a remake of the 1969 film The Illustrated Man with Zack Snyder attached as a director; she will also produce Horse Latitudes, which was formerly known as The Last Photograph and The Fountainhead, a film about a photograph that inspires two men to travel to South America and a novel adaptation from Ayn Rand, respectively.

On January 29, 2019, Zack Snyder announced that he had signed on to helm Army of the Dead, a zombie horror thriller, for Netflix. Snyder co-produced with her husband, Zack Snyder and producing partner, Wesley Coller, via their newly rebranded production company, The Stone Quarry.

== Filmography ==
Producer

- Watchmen (2009)
- Sucker Punch (2011)
- Man of Steel (2013)
- 300: Rise of an Empire (2014)
- Batman v Superman: Dawn of Justice (2016)
- Wonder Woman (2017)
- Justice League (2017)
- Wonder Woman 1984 (2020)
- Zack Snyder's Justice League (2021)
- Army of the Dead (2021)
- Army of Thieves (2021)
- Rebel Moon – Part One: A Child of Fire (2023)
- Rebel Moon – Part Two: The Scargiver (2024)
- The Last Photograph (2026)

Executive producer

- 300 (2006)
- Legend of the Guardians: The Owls of Ga'Hoole (2010)
- Suicide Squad (2016)
- Aquaman (2018)
- The Suicide Squad (2021)
- Twilight of the Gods (2024)
