= Manfred von Richthofen (sports official) =

German hockey player and coach

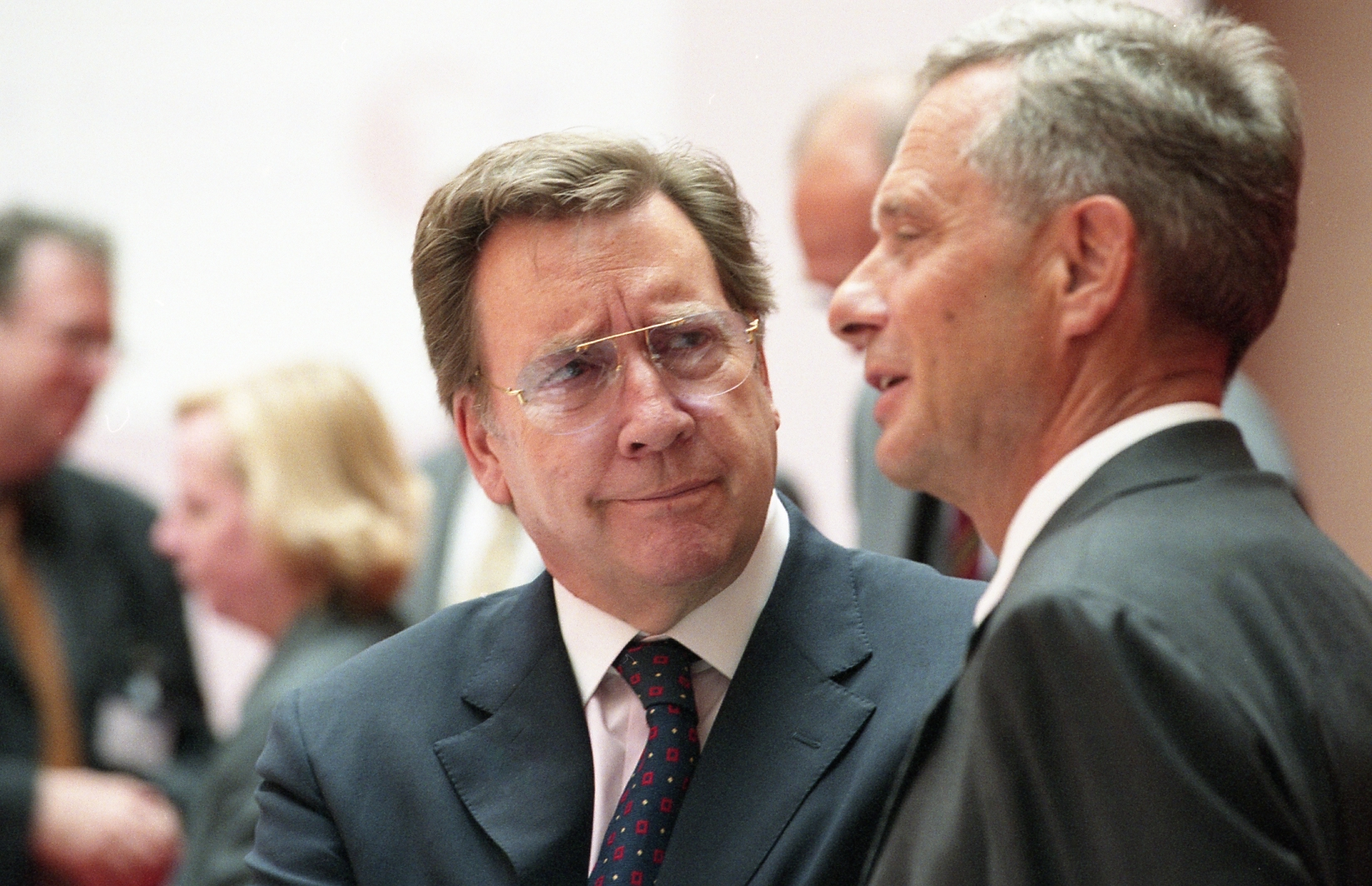
Manfred von Richthofen, 2002

Manfred von Richthofen (4 February 1934 – 1 May 2014) was a German hockey player and coach.

== Life ==
Richthofen was born in Berlin, which was then the capital of the Weimar Republic. He was a descendant of the German nobility from Prussian Silesia and was the nephew of legendary World War I flying ace Manfred von Richthofen ("The Red Baron"). His ice hockey career began during the 1950s. He retired in 2006 and served as an honorary President of German's national Olympic federation.

Reviewing the 2008 biopic The Red Baron, he said "It's a remarkable movie... Somehow it did not turn into a war film. The personality and especially the thoughtfulness of my uncle are true to life."

Richthofen died in Berlin, Germany from unknown causes, aged 80.
