= You Are Wanted =

- Cover art for season 1
- Created by: Hanno Hackfort; Bob Konrad; Richard Kropf
- Directed by: Matthias Schweighöfer; Bernhard Jasper
- Composers: Josef Bach; Arne Schumann; Matthias Schweighöfer
- Country of origin: Germany
- Original language: German
- No. of seasons: 2
- No. of episodes: 12 (6 per season)

Production
- Running time: 44-48 minutes
- Production companies: Pantaleon Films; Warner Bros. Film Productions Germany; Warner Bros. International Television Production Germany

Original release
- Release: 17 March 2017 – 18 May 2018

You Are Wanted is a German drama series directed and produced by and starring Matthias Schweighöfer, first released on 17 March 2017 by Amazon Video, the first foreign-language Amazon Original Series to be released globally.

The series was written and created by Hanno Hackfort, Bob Konrad and Richard Kropf.

A second season was commissioned by Amazon in March 2017 and was released on 18 May 2018. The second season features Jessica Schwarz, Hannah Hoekstra and Michael Landes as new characters.

== Plot ==
Lukas Franke (Matthias Schweighöfer), a hotel manager in Berlin, is the victim of a cyber attack and has his online data altered to implicate him as a member of a terrorist-activist group. He searches for the people responsible to prove his innocence, but his friends, family and colleagues begin to doubt him. He discovers another hacking victim, Lena Arandt (Karoline Herfurth), whom he tries to work with to find out the truth.

Meanwhile, police investigator Sandra Jansen (Catrin Striebeck) is leading the investigation into Franke alongside her partner Thorsten Siebert (Edin Hasanović), whilst the German Federal Intelligence Service, the BND, also begin to get involved.

== Cast ==
- Matthias Schweighöfer as Lukas Franke
- Alexandra Maria Lara as Hanna Franke
- Catrin Striebeck as Sandra Jensen
- Franz Hagn as Leon Franke
- Karoline Herfurth as Lena Aradnt
- Tom Beck as Marc Wessling
- Thomas Schmauser as Frank Jeryczek/Jens Kaufmann
- Jörg Pintsch as Thomas Franke
- Alexander Khuon as Johnny
- Louis Hofmann as Dalton
- Lucie Aron as Vero
- Markus Gertken as Lorenz
- Edin Hasanović as Thorsten Siebert
- Katrin Bauerfeind as Julia Gracht
- Lorna Ishema as Dilara Dogan
- Aleksandar Jovanovic as Case
- Dejan Bucin as Blaschko
- Ulrich Drewes as Lippel

== Episodes ==
Season 1
#	Title	Director	Writers	Original air date
1	"Blackout"	Matthias Schweighöfer, Bernhard Jasper	Hanno Hackfort, Bob Konrad, Richard Kropf	17 March 2017
Lukas Franke (Matthias Schweighöfer) finds he has been hacked and implicated in a cyber-attack on Berlin. He tries to contact his brother Thomas (Jörg Pintsch) for help, but Thomas sends him to a hacker named Dalton (Louis Hofmann).
2	"X-Ray"	Matthias Schweighöfer, Bernhard Jasper	Hanno Hackfort, Bob Konrad, Richard Kropf	17 March 2017
The hacker, Kaufmann, instructs Lukas to take a package to Frankfurt, where he meets Lena Arandt (Karoline Herfurth), another hacking victim. Meanwhile, Hanna begins to doubt Lukas' innocence, and police officers Sandra Jansen (Catrin Striebeck) and Thorsten Siebert (Edin Hasanović) start to investigate Lukas.
3	"Trust"	Matthias Schweighöfer, Bernhard Jasper	Hanno Hackfort, Bob Konrad, Richard Kropf	17 March 2017
Lukas is questioned by the police, who suspect he is planning additional attacks. The hacker reveals details of an affair to Hanna. Lukas discovers that Kaufmann (Thomas Schmauser), is actually Frank Jeryczek, and meets with him in his apartment. Jeryczek agrees to upload a video that will prove Lukas' innocence, but is shot and killed and the computer files destroyed before it can be uploaded. Jansen suspects that there is a leak in the department.
4	"Noob"	Matthias Schweighöfer, Bernhard Jasper	Hanno Hackfort, Bob Konrad, Richard Kropf	17 March 2017
Lukas escapes with the help of Lena, but they are now both suspected of Jeryczek's murder. Hanna is questioned by the police after they raid the home and take her and Leon. Dalton helps Lukas find the person behind Jeryczek's death, who is going by the username 'Slomo' in the online game Dreadnought. Lukas meets with him and discovers that it is actually Marc (Tom Beck), who asks for an access code given to Lukas by his friend Case.
5	"Rollo"	Matthias Schweighöfer, Bernhard Jasper	Hanno Hackfort, Bob Konrad, Richard Kropf	17 March 2017
Lena explains her past to Lukas. Lukas revisits the psychiatric hospital where he worked and discovers a clue from Case. Lukas is then arrested by the police, but manages to warn Hanna to get herself and Leon to safety. Lorenz, an investigator at the BND takes custody of Lukas.
6	"Burning Man"	Matthias Schweighöfer, Bernhard Jasper	Hanno Hackfort, Bob Konrad, Richard Kropf	17 March 2017
Jansen and Siebert begin to suspect that Lukas may be innocent. They visit Marc's house where they discover Lorenz has been killed. Siebert and Jansen are injured by an explosion. Marc releases Lukas to get him to reveal the access code. Marc kidnaps Leon, and attempts to use him to blow up an NSA agent. Lukas works together with Dalton and Hanna to save Leon and stop Marc.

Season 2
#	Title	Director	Writers	Original Air Date
1	File Not Found	Matthias Schweighöfer, Bernhard Jasper	Bernhard Jasper, Markus Hoffmann, Uwe Kossmann, Cornelia Popp	18 May 2018
2	Krypto-Angel	Matthias Schweighöfer, Bernhard Jasper	Bernhard Jasper, Markus Hoffmann, Uwe Kossmann, Cornelia Popp	18 May 2018
3	Virus	Matthias Schweighöfer, Bernhard Jasper	Bernhard Jasper, Markus Hoffmann, Uwe Kossmann, Cornelia Popp, Arndt Stüwe	18 May 2018
4	Shift Memory	Matthias Schweighöfer, Bernhard Jasper	Bernhard Jasper, Markus Hoffmann, Uwe Kossmann, Cornelia Popp	18 May 2018
5	Shut Down	Matthias Schweighöfer, Bernhard Jasper	Bernhard Jasper, Markus Hoffmann, Uwe Kossmann, Cornelia Popp	18 May 2018
6	Reboot	Matthias Schweighöfer, Bernhard Jasper	Bernhard Jasper, Markus Hoffmann, Uwe Kossmann, Cornelia Popp, Arndt Stüwe	18 May 2018

== Reception ==
=== Awards ===
- Golden Trailer Awards - Best Foreign (TV Spot/Trailer/Teaser for a Series) (GTA18/2017) - Nominee
- Romy Award 2018 Ceremony - Preis der Jury [Prize of the Jury] - Winner

== Soundtrack ==
A soundtrack album featuring original music composed by Josef Bach and Arne Schumann, as well as songs by Simon Hughes, Tina Pepper, Chester Travis and Walking on Cars, was released alongside the series on 17 March 2017.

=== Track listing ===
All music is composed by Josef Bach and Arne Schumann (unless otherwise indicated).

No.	Title	Length
1.	"What We Can't See" (also by Matthias Schweighöfer)	1:08
2.	"Taking Action" (by Tina Pepper)	1:40
3.	"Puncture" (by Chester Travis)	3:53
4.	"Leon's Good Night Story"	3:50
5.	"On The Ground"	1:38
6.	"You Started a Fight"	2:32
7.	"Universal Love" (by Simon Hughes)	0:57
8.	"Who's the Winner Now"	4:10
9.	"Vacuum"	3:50
10.	"Always Be With You" (by Walking on Cars)	3:55
11.	"Torn Apart"	1:44
12.	"Leon's Agent Equipment"	1:33
13.	"Heartbeats" (by Simon Hughes)	1:19
14.	"A Perfect World"	3:49
15.	"I Am God"	4:14
16.	"Great Escape" (by Simon Hughes)	2:22
17.	"Moment of Perception"	1:02
18.	"Will You Help Me"	5:00
19.	"We're Family"	2:04
20.	"Don't Trust Me"	3:25
21.	"Where Do We Go Next"	0:33
22.	"Stars in Spades" (by Chester Travis)	1:40
23.	"The Car Park"	1:56
24.	"One Man Down"	1:05
25.	"I'm Proud of You Agent Leon"	0:45
26.	"The Shallows" (by Chester Travis)	3:55
27.	"Let's Disappear"	4:59
28.	"Subject Franke"	3:39
