= Army of Thieves =

2021 film by Matthias Schweighöfer

- Release poster
- Directed by: Matthias Schweighöfer
- Screenplay by: Shay Hatten
- Story by: Zack Snyder; Shay Hatten
- Based on: Characters by Zack Snyder
- Produced by: Deborah Snyder; Zack Snyder; Wesley Coller; Dan Maag; Matthias Schweighöfer
- Starring: Matthias Schweighöfer; Nathalie Emmanuel; Ruby O. Fee; Stuart Martin; Guz Khan; Jonathan Cohen
- Cinematography: Bernhard Jasper
- Edited by: Alexander Berner
- Music by: Hans Zimmer; Steve Mazzaro
- Production companies: The Stone Quarry; Pantaleon Films
- Distributed by: Netflix
- Release date: October 29, 2021
- Running time: 130 minutes
- Countries: United States; Germany
- Languages: English; German; French; Czech

Army of Thieves is a 2021 heist comedy film directed by Matthias Schweighöfer from a screenplay by Shay Hatten, based on a story he wrote with Zack Snyder. A prequel to the post-apocalyptic zombie heist film Army of the Dead (2021), it is the second and final installment in the Army of the Dead franchise; the film stars Schweighöfer, who reprises his role as Ludwig Dieter, alongside a supporting cast that includes Nathalie Emmanuel, Ruby O. Fee, Stuart Martin, Guz Khan, and Jonathan Cohen. Filming began in Germany and the Czech Republic in October 2020, and concluded by December 2020.

Army of Thieves was released on Netflix on October 29, 2021. It received lukewarm reviews from critics who praised the performances of Schweighöfer and Emmanuel as well as Schweighöfer's direction, but criticized the plot for being unoriginal.

== Plot ==
Sebastian Schlencht-Wöhnert has a mundane life as a bank teller in Potsdam, Germany. A zombie outbreak in Nevada dominates international news, giving him nightmares about them. He also produces YouTube videos about safecracking that receive no attention until a mysterious figure comments on his most recent, inviting him to an underground safecracking competition. Sebastian wins the contest and is introduced to Gwendoline Starr, a skilled jewel thief who had commented upon his YouTube video.

Gwendoline recruits Sebastian into a heist crew consisting of herself, expert hacker Korina Dominguez, getaway driver Rolph and gunman Brad Cage to break into three banks that have the legendary safes created by legendary locksmith Hans Wagner, which currently belongs to billionaire Bly Tanaka. The safes will be decommissioned in less than a week, so time is running out for someone to break into them.

Sebastian, a theoretical expert on Wagner's work and safecracking but with no practical experience, is convinced by Gwendoline to join them for the challenge of breaking into a Wagner safe. Together, the crew successfully undertake their heist of the first safe in Paris, escaping with only a fraction of the money that is actually in it. Gwendoline justifies this, as the challenge and reputation far outweigh any major monetary gain.

As the crew celebrates after the Paris heist, Sebastian develops feelings for Gwendoline, drawing jealousy from Brad, her boyfriend since their teens, learning his real name was Alexis. The crew travels to Prague, the location of the second safe, and are followed by Delacroix, an obsessive Interpol agent leading a unit that has been trying to capture Gwendoline and the crew for years after Brad shot him during a theft.

Sebastian and Gwendoline enter the bank but are soon identified by security, forcing Brad to create a distraction with a pretend robbery. Sebastian cracks the second safe, leaving with Gwendoline and another haul of money as Delacroix and his team race to the bank to stop them. Brad is shot in the shoulder by a security guard and narrowly escapes the bank, ahead of Sebastian and Gwendoline. Brad then deliberately leaves Sebastian behind as the team flees, forcing him to shake off the pursuing police alone.

Angry at Brad's actions, Gwendoline and Korina leave the crew. However, the original plan was to ditch Sebastian after the three heists were complete. The women head back to Potsdam and reunite with Sebastian, telling him that the pursuit of the Wagner challenge is more important to them than any monetary gain.

The trio heads to St. Moritz, location of the last safe in Europe, while Interpol also arrives. Delacroix's team believes they have a lead on the theft, only to be tricked again by them. They hijacked the safe during its transfer from the casino. Their hijacking also usurps Brad and Rolph's idea of robbing the safe.

Gwendoline and Sebastian leave St. Moritz on a lorry, chased by Brad and Rolph. Korina, caught by Interpol, manages to warn them about the other two before selling them out in exchange for her family's safety. Sebastian has to crack the safe in the lorry while Brad, Rolph, and Interpol pursue them. He succeeds, finding another large haul of cash. However, before they can leave with it, Rolph and an increasingly unstable Brad arrive. Gwendoline overpowers and handcuffs them to the truck for Interpol to find before leaving with Sebastian.

Before escaping on a boat from the town of Hallstatt, Austria, Sebastian and Gwendoline confess their mutual feelings. However, Delacroix catches them, resulting in a standoff between him and Gwendoline. Out of love for Sebastian, she sacrifices herself to be arrested so that he can escape, promising to find him once she is free. Sebastian goes, vowing he will be reunited with Gwendoline one day.

Later, Scott Ward and Maria Cruz find Sebastian's (now going by Ludwig Dieter's) locksmith shop in California. They offer him the chance to crack Wagner's legendary "missing" safe, which Gwendoline and Sebastian had resolved to break together once she was free; Ludwig accepts the job.

== Cast ==
- Matthias Schweighöfer as Ludwig Dieter / Sebastian Schlencht-Wöhnert
  - Leonard Treyde as 12-year-old Dieter
- Nathalie Emmanuel as Gwendoline Starr
  - Jasmina Peña Milian as 6-year-old Gwendoline
  - Nandi Sawyers-Hudson as 16-year-old Gwendoline
- Ruby O. Fee as Korina Dominguez
  - Violina Maria Rostami as 10-12-year-old Korina
- Stuart Martin as Brad Cage / Alexis Broschini
  - David Dvorscík as 11-year-old Brad Cage
- Guz Khan as Rolph
- Jonathan Cohen as Delacroix
- Noémie Nakai as Beatrix
- Christian Steyer as Hans Wagner
- Barbara Meier as Lucy
- Peter Hosking as Policeman Joe
- Fanette Ronjat as Floor Manager

Additionally, Amy Huck makes a cameo role as Lady Café, while Peter Simonischek appears uncredited as a locksmith at Dieter's shop. Reprising their roles uncredited and appearing in extended archive footage from Army of the Dead are Dave Bautista and Ana de la Reguera as Scott Ward and Maria Cruz, respectively, while Hiroyuki Sanada appears as Bly Tanaka through a still image.

== Production ==
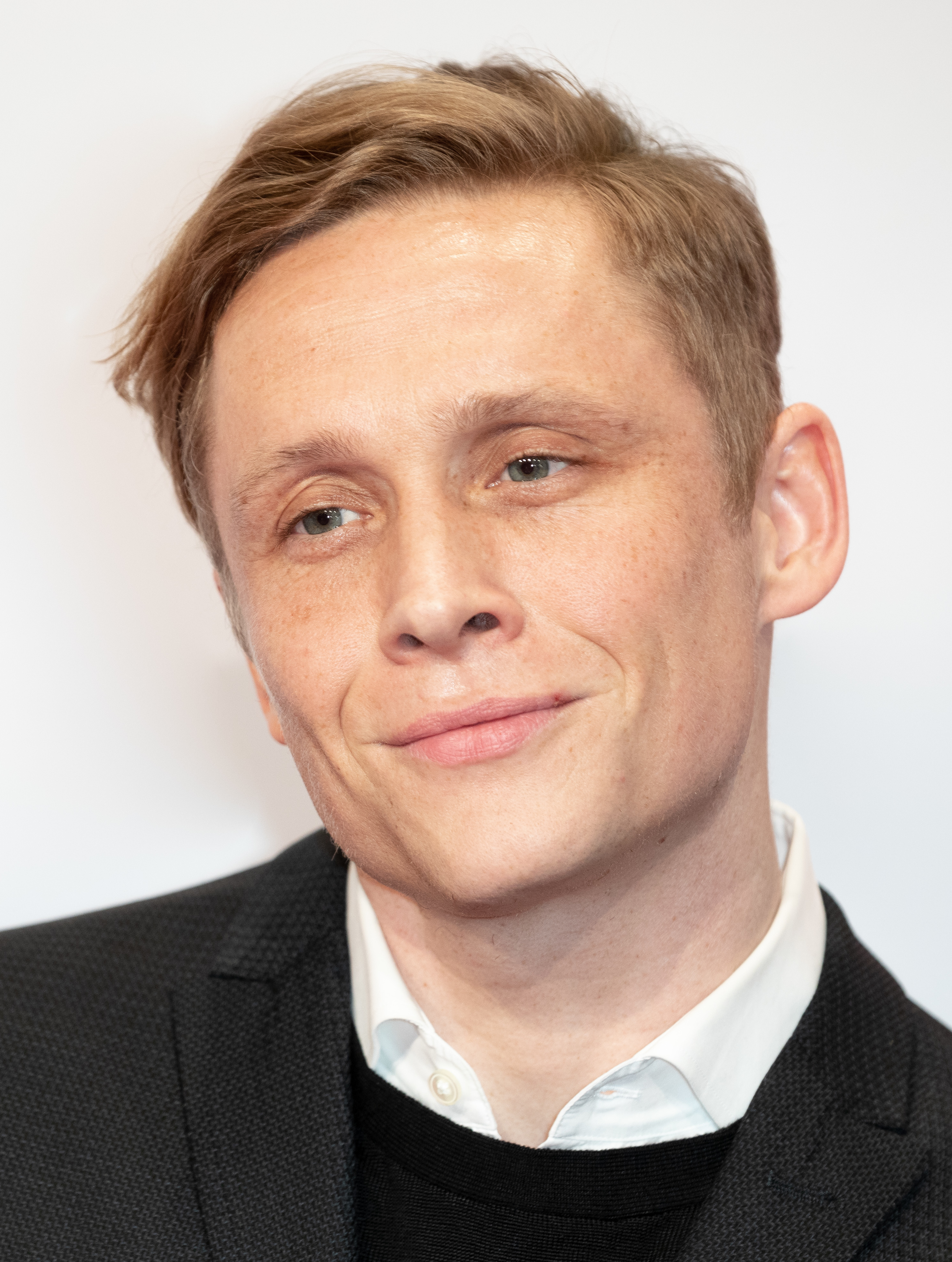
Matthias Schweighöfer serves as director, producer and lead actor

In September 2020, it was announced that the film, then known as Army of the Dead: The Prequel, was in development at Netflix. Filming took place in Germany and the Czech Republic, and finished in December 2020. In a February 2021 interview, Deborah Snyder referred to the film as Army of Thieves. That same month, Army of the Dead composer Tom Holkenborg confirmed that he would be working on both the prequel and the tie-in animated series Army of the Dead: Lost Vegas. In April 2021, Zack Snyder confirmed the official title. In August 2021, Matthias Schweighöfer announced on Twitter that Hans Zimmer and Steve Mazzaro will serve as composers for the film with Holkenborg contributing.

In May 2021, Deborah Snyder described the film as similar to The Italian Job in a world where zombies exist, while explaining that the film is standalone in nature. The producer classified the genre as a romantic comedy heist film that canonically depicts the early stages of the zombie pandemic portrayed in the previous film; stating: "[it] takes place in a world where these zombies exist in America and it’s causing instability in the banking institutions. They’re moving money around, so it’s the perfect opportunity for a heist." The plot will center around Schweighöfer's character Ludwig Dieter, showing how he learned to crack safes with previous heist teams. While Schweighöfer acknowledged that while the movie isn't categorically a zombie film, the filmmaker teased that the undead may appear. Snyder confirmed that there will be zombies in the film.

== Release ==
On July 25, 2021, Netflix unveiled its first teaser trailer for the film which premiered at San Diego Comic-Con. In the special panel, the team discussed the upcoming prequel as producer Deborah Snyder said; "Who's done a prequel where it's a different genre of film? To me this is more of a romantic, comedy, heist film than anything else. It just happens to live in this world where zombies are in the U.S. and it's causing the banking system some instability."

Army of Thieves was released in the United States on October 29, 2021, via streaming on Netflix.

== Reception ==
=== Critical response ===
On Rotten Tomatoes, 69% of 96 reviews are positive, with an average rating of 5.9/10. The website's critics consensus reads: "Army of Thieves doesn't reinvent the heist thriller, but director-star Matthias Schweighöfer proves an appealing presence on both sides of the camera." On Metacritic, it has a weighted average score of 49 out of 100 based on 22 critics, indicating "mixed or average" reviews.

David Rooney of The Hollywood Reporter wrote: "The storytelling overall is less sophisticated, leaning a little too often on strained humor, but this is a slick, enjoyably playful entertainment." Owen Gleiberman of Variety gave the film a mixed review and called it "one of those bombastically blithe and fanciful Netflix action movies, in this case with a romantic heart".

Rotten Tomatoes lists the film on its 100 Best Zombie Movies, Ranked by Tomatometer.

=== Viewership ===
Army of Thieves ranked at the top of Netflix's top 10 weekly rankings for English-language films, based on its recently launched method of ranking TV shows and films by the total amount of hours they are viewed, during its debut week with a viewership of 49.64 million hours. It also ranked first on Netflix in more than 90 countries. Samba TV estimated that the film was watched by 770,000 households in the United States. It was also the third most-watched film overall in the United States during the week according to TV Time. Nielsen meanwhile ranked it as the fourth-most-streamed film for the week with 294 million minutes viewed.

It remained the most-watched film on Netflix in its second week with 71.61 million hours viewed, while also rising to the second position on TV Time's chart. Nielsen reported that it was the second-most-streamed film during the week, with 456 million minutes viewed. It was ranked fourth on Netflix in its third week with 20.56 million hours viewed, and seventh in the fourth week with 12.26 million hours.
