= Friendship! =

- Theatrical release poster
- Directed by: Markus Goller
- Starring: Matthias Schweighöfer; Friedrich Mücke; Alicja Bachleda-Curuś
- Cinematography: Ueli Steiger
- Music by: Martin Probst
- Production companies: Deutsche Columbia Pictures Filmproduktion; Wiedemann & Berg Film; Mr. Brown Entertainment
- Distributed by: Sony Pictures Entertainment Deutschland GmbH
- Release date: 14 January 2010
- Running time: 110 minutes
- Country: Germany
- Languages: German; English
- Box office: $38 million

Friendship! is a 2010 German comedy film directed by Markus Goller.

== Plot ==
Berlin 1989: After the fall of the Berlin wall, Veit (Mücke) and his friend Tom (Schweighöfer) decide to fly to San Francisco. Veit claims that he wants to travel to San Francisco because of the Golden Gate Bridge which is "The westernmost point in the world." Tom is also fascinated by the idea and goes there with his friend.

Because the money they have saved is not quite enough they both book a flight to New York. Arriving there with only 55 dollars, a few clothes and some self-made films, Tom learns the real reason for Veit's desire to travel to San Francisco: Veit's goal above all else is to see his father again, who 12 years ago fled from the GDR and whose only sign of life is an annual birthday postcard. Veit wants to wait in front of the post office in San Francisco on his birthday - to meet his father when he sends the annual birthday card to him. They decide to travel further by hitch-hiking, because the remaining money would only buy them a train ticket to New Jersey.

A comic book graphic artist named Daryll takes them both in his AMC Pacer in the direction of San Francisco. Daryll brings them both to a bar where they can show their film in the hopes of earning a little money. They meet two young girls who invite them to their house. Because the parents come back earlier than expected, Tom and Veit have to leave the house in a hurry and spend the night in the wilderness.

The next morning they get a free breakfast in a diner. Then Veit brings one of the customers - a biker - the wallet which he had forgotten on the table. The gang of bikers takes the two to the West. However, during a rest a fight starts between Veit and a drunk biker. Tom is injured in the teeth as he tries to get between them. Another biker Hope loans Veit and Tom his brother's car, under the condition that they deliver it to Hope's brother near San Francisco. The biker also tells them that he has no key for the trunk. Despite the suspicions of the two that they could be carrying drugs or weapons, they accept the offer. Actually, there are pieces of Star Wars merchandise in the trunk. The boys only discover this when they were stopped by the police who forcibly open the trunk.

In Silver City, New Mexico, they got to know Zoey, who speaks German thanks to her German mother and at whose place they spend two nights. In the local cinema, they show a documentary about the DDR and are subsequently invited to meet the Mayor. In the town they sell painted pieces of concrete as supposedly authentic pieces of the Berlin Wall so that they can pay for necessary repairs to the car. At last the trio drives in the direction of San Francisco. At a stopover in Las Vegas, Veit and Tom go to a gay club in Russian army clothes to strip in order to earn money for Tom's necessary dental treatment. While Veit waits in the hotel room for the other two, Tom spends the night with Zoey. This angers Veit, since he is in love with her too, and he drives off alone. Tom has a bad conscience and finally leaves Zoey, and it is unclear if the two will see each other again.

Tom and Veit meet again in front of the San Francisco post office and reconcile. While Veit has gone to get them a pizza, Tom believes he recognizes Veit's father, who is walking to the post office with a postcard in his hand. As a result, Tom speaks to him. After an initial hesitation, the stranger explains that he is not Veit's father, who was shot on the wall as he tried to escape. This man had at that time put his own application for a departure, which was granted by the Stasi on the condition that in the place of the dead victim (Veit's father) on the Berlin Wall, he should send letters and cards to the victim's relatives in order to make them believe that the escape attempt did not end in death.

Before Veit returns with the pizza, the stranger has gone, leaving Tom with the postcard. Tom tells Veit that his father is dead and Veit runs off aimlessly through San Francisco. Tom follows him to the Golden Gate Bridge where they embrace each other. The film ends with them delivering the car to Hope's brother.

== Cast ==
- Matthias Schweighöfer as Tom
- Friedrich Mücke as Veit
- Alicja Bachleda-Curuś as Zoey
- Todd Stashwick as Darryl
- Peter Macon as Hope
- Kevin Rankin as Marvin
- Cameron Goodman as Amber
- Kimberly J. Brown as Dorothee

== Production ==
The movie is based on a real-life journey of the producer Tom Zickler, who started out with friends after the fall of the Wall in order to travel to San Francisco. They also could only fly to New York because of money and needed to hitchhike the rest of the way. He hardly spoke any English and needed to work in a strip club to earn money.

Friendship! was produced by Wiedemann & Berg Film Production in cooperation with Brown Entertainment and SevenPictures. The film was the first movie project distributed by the German Columbia Pictures/German Sony Pictures Film Production.

The parents of Tom's character are played by the actual parents of Matthias Schweighöfer. The sketches of the graphic artist who brought Tom and Veit in the car are redolent of the cartoon characters Ren and Stimpy. The character is also reminiscent in appearance and manner of the Canadian artist John Kricfalusi.

== Release ==
Friendship! premièred on 11 January 2010 in the CinemaxX on the Potsdamer Platz in Berlin. The official German premiere was on 14 January of that year. In Germany, the production was watched by 336,777 viewers by the end of the first weekend it was displayed and with a 908 people average audience in 371 cinemas was placed right after the James Camerons' Avatar (2009) on the second place of the cinema charts.

In total the comedy stayed in the top 20 in the charts for seven weeks and recorded about 10.3 million Euro in the box office until May 2013, with 1,597,200 viewers. In the official ranking of the most seen cinema movies of the year 2010, the production took the 14th place. Nevertheless, Friendship! advanced to the most successful German film production of the year.

== Reception ==
The Encyclopedia of International Films describes the comedy as "good humored, well crafted, carefully designed buddy movie, to which stands the skillful and sophisticated production in blatant disparity to the cliche-ridden and simplicity of the content. Kino.de summarizes, "it is seldom that someone in the wild west so explosively breaks in as these two easterners have." [...] Friendship! is the first feature film project by Markus Goller. It is beneficial to him that he lives in the U.S. and learned his work as a commercial director. Because rarely before has a German director put so well into picture the endless American hinterland."

Critic.de writes; "From the beginning, the mystery of Veit's past makes a tragic undertone. The real purpose of his journey is his father, who fled from the DDR years ago and now lives in San Francisco. The only sign of life since then was an annual birthday postcard to his son, Veit wants to catch him and so the trip soon becomes a race against time. [...] We finally find out how he actually did it and with this begins Friendship! Then however timidly on explicit political terrain - how successful this is, is argumentative, but with the opinionated gesture of coming from the same home The Lives of Others (2006) the film has little in common."

Johannes von der Gathen, author of dpa, described the film as "entertaining, but arg silly comedy that lead straight and without subtleties of socialist rain in the neo-capitalist eaves." "It can be the [...] Director [...] of a cliché about the clash of cultures. If the producers Max Wiedemann and Quirin Berg, a few years ago with the Oscar-winning "The Lives of Others" managed a sensation, you could celebrate similar success with this half-hearted humor and casserole might be greatly doubted. But the screenplay by Oliver Ziegenbalg lurches too listless of Gag to Gag, in between there are then some criticism of capitalism before the movie quite openly bathing in nostalgia again "MovieMaze however, wrote: "Though the crew shoots in some places significantly over target also, but everything is possible in all an entertaining road movie with a good dose of slapstick."

konfenster.de voted the film to be Film of the Month in January 2010 and recommended it as an educationally valuable film, suited for classroom discussion. The film offers easy entertaining access to the historical and political background of GDR time and reunited Germany. From the contrast between two countries with different systems, director Markus Goller creates all kinds of comical sparks."

== Accolades ==
- Bavarian Film Award 2009: in the category "Best Talented Young Actor" for Friedrich Mücke
- Audience Award at the German Films Festival, 2010 in Madrid
- Audience Award in the Best Film category (Non-Mediterranean Competition) at the Taormina Film Fest, 2010
- Audience Award in the Best Film category at the Salerno Shadowline Film Festival, 2010
- MTV Movie Awards 2011: in categories "Best German Film", "Best Actor in a German Film", and "best fiddling" in a German movie
