= Wiedemann & Berg Film Production =

German film production company

Wiedemann & Berg Film / W&B Television
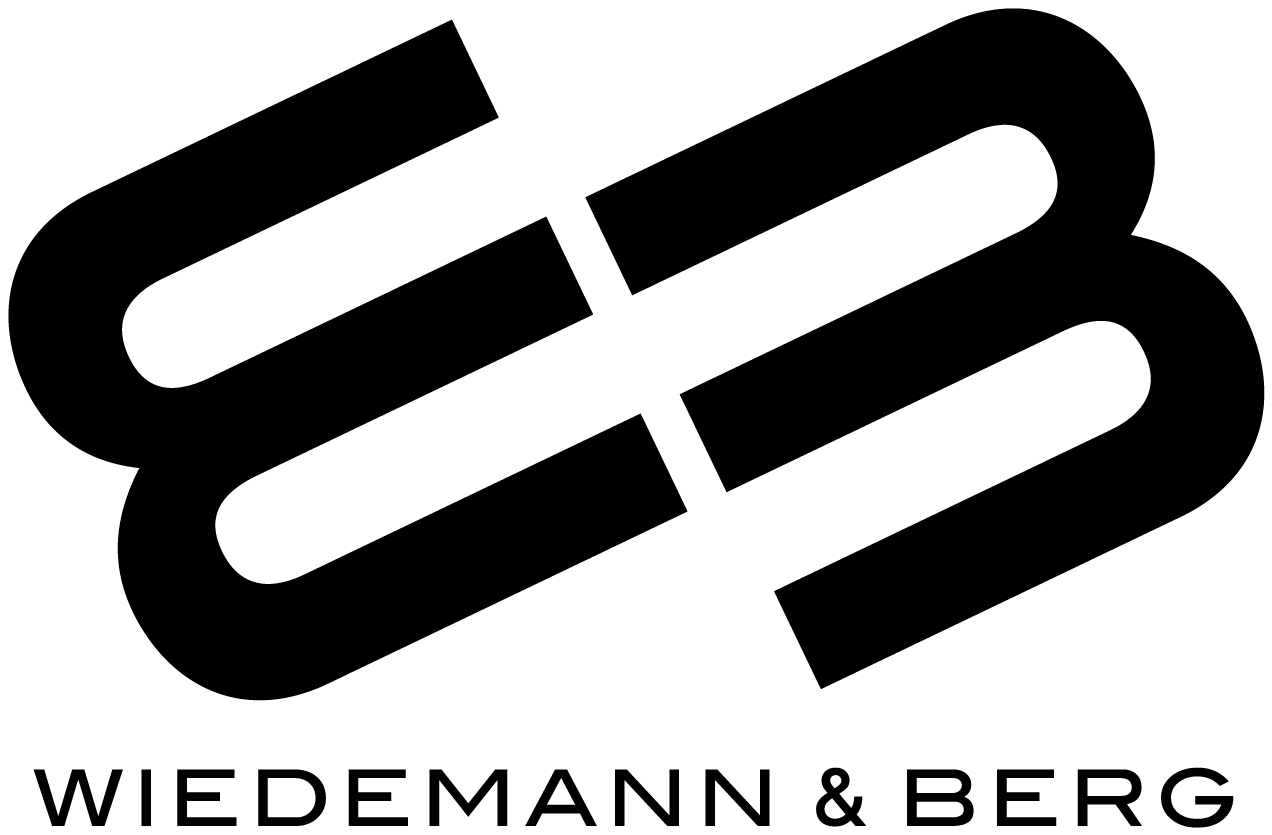
- Type: GmbH
- Industry: Film; Television
- Founded: 2003
- Founders: Max Wiedemann; Quirin Berg
- Headquarters: Munich, Germany
- Parent: Leonine Holding (2019–present)
- Website: www.w-b-film.de

Wiedemann & Berg Film is a German film production company founded by Max Wiedemann and Quirin Berg in 2003. The company's first movie The Lives of Others won the Academy Award for Best Foreign Language Film in 2007.

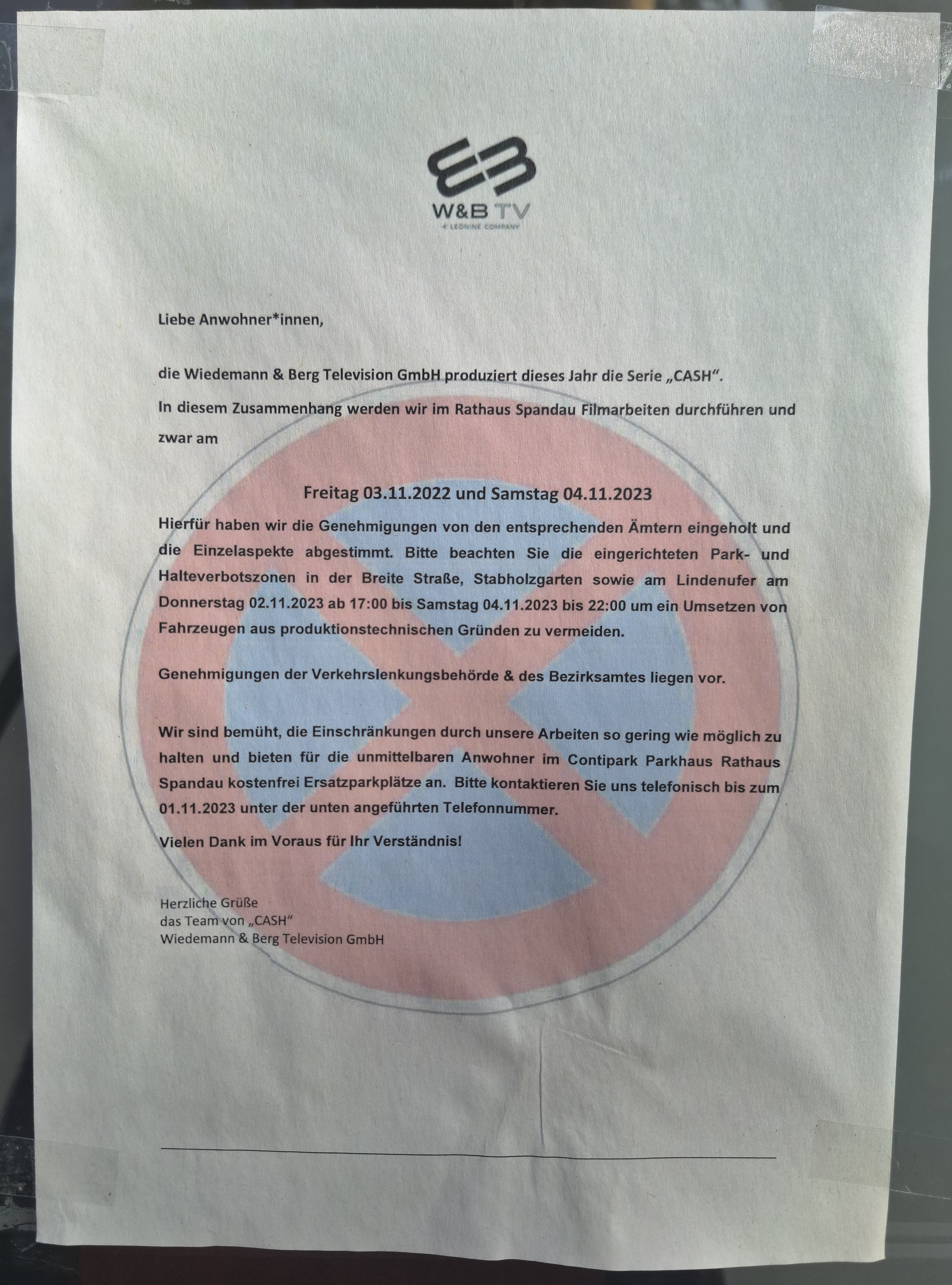
Announcement of recordings by W&B Television GmbH for the german series „Cash“

== History ==
In 2003, while still studying at the Hochschule für Fernsehen und Film München (The University of Television and Film Munich), Max Wiedemann and Quirin Berg founded Wiedemann & Berg Film.

In December 2009, Wiedemann & Berg Film announced that they had entered into TV production a launching a joint-venture with Dutch-based production and distribution company Endemol under their Endemol Germany division which was named Wiedemann & Berg Television with their W&B Film founders Quirin Berg and Max Wiedemann jointly managing W&B Film's television joint venture arm.

In April 2019, American-based global investment company Kohlberg Kravis Roberts (KKR) announced that they had brought Wiedemann & Berg Film Production following the former company's acquisitions of three other German companies with W&B's television division joint venture with Endemol Shine Germany being excluded from the sale will continue to run as a separate production company.

Since January 2020, both companies are part of the studio Leonine. Both Wiedemann and Berg are shareholders and founding members of the studio and, as Leonine Holding's managing directors and chief production officers, lead the group's entire fiction production.

Their first feature film was directed by Florian Henckel von Donnersmarck, titled The Lives of Others. It received the Oscar for Best Foreign Language Film in 2007, followed by Never Look Away, which was nominated for two Academy Awards in 2019. Other cinematic features include Baran bo Odar's thriller Who am I and Simon Verhoeven's comedy Welcome to Germany, which had over 3 million theatergoers in 2016. Nightlife, which opened in theaters on February 13, 2020, marked the fifth collaboration with Simon Verhoeven.

Next to traditional production formats for free TV or linear television, Wiedemann & Berg has also positioned itself as the first German company within the new market of pay television and video on demand. In 2012, the first German self-produced pay TV show was created for TNT Serie, followed by 4 Blocks. Wiedemann & Berg also produced Dark, the first German Netflix Original and Pagan Peak, one of the first originals for Sky Deutschland. Tribes of Europa is another series that's being produced for Netflix.

Max Wiedemann and Quirin Berg are members of Deutsche Filmakademie, British Film Academy as well as European Film Academy.

== Awards and accolades ==
Wiedemann & Berg Film and Wiedemann & Berg Television's producers and productions have received an Academy Award, Auszeichnung der Deutschen Akademie für Fernsehen (Award of the German Academy for TV), BAFTA, Bayerischer Fernsehpreis (Bavarian TV Award), Bayerischer Filmpreis (Bavarian Film Award), César, European Film Award, Hollywood Reporter Award, Deutscher Fernsehpreis (German TV Award), Deutscher Filmpreis (German Film Award), Fernsehfilmpreis der Deutschen Akademie der Darstellenden Künste (TV Film Award of the German Academy of Performing Arts), Goldene Kamera (Golden Camera), Grimme-Preis (Grimme Award), LA Critics Award, Magnolia Award, Rockie Award, Romy and Golden Globe.

== Filmography ==
=== Film ===
| Year | Title | Production partners | Distributor |
|---|---|---|---|
| 2006 | The Lives of Others | | Buena Vista International |
| 2008 | U-900 | | Warner Bros. Pictures |
| 2009 | Men in the City | | Warner Bros. Pictures |
| 2010 | Friendship! | Deutsche Columbia Pictures Filmproduktion, Mr. Brown Entertainment | Sony Pictures Releasing |
| 2011 | Men in the City 2 | | Warner Bros. Pictures |
| 2012 | Wer's glaubt, wird selig | | Constantin Film |
| 2013 | Girl on a Bicycle | | Warner Bros. Pictures |
| 2014 | Joy of Fatherhood | Pantaleon Films | Warner Bros. Pictures |
| 2014 | Who Am I | Deutsche Columbia Pictures Filmproduktion, SevenPictures Film | Sony Pictures Releasing |
| 2016 | Friend Request | Two Oceans Productions, SevenPictures Film | Warner Bros. Pictures |
| 2016 | Welcome to Germany | Sentana Film, SevenPictures Film | Warner Bros. Pictures |
| 2018 | Never Look Away | | Buena Vista International |
| 2019 | The Goldfish | Deutsche Columbia Pictures Filmproduktion, SevenPictures Film | Sony Pictures Releasing |
| 2020 | Nightlife | Sentana Filmproduktion, SevenPictures Film | Warner Bros. Pictures |
| 2023 | Weekend Rebels | SevenPictures Film | Leonine Studios |
| 2024 | Girl You Know It's True | Leonine Productions, Sentana Film, SevenPictures Film, Mediawan, Voltage Pictures | Leonine Studios |
