= Marco Beckmann =

German film and television producer

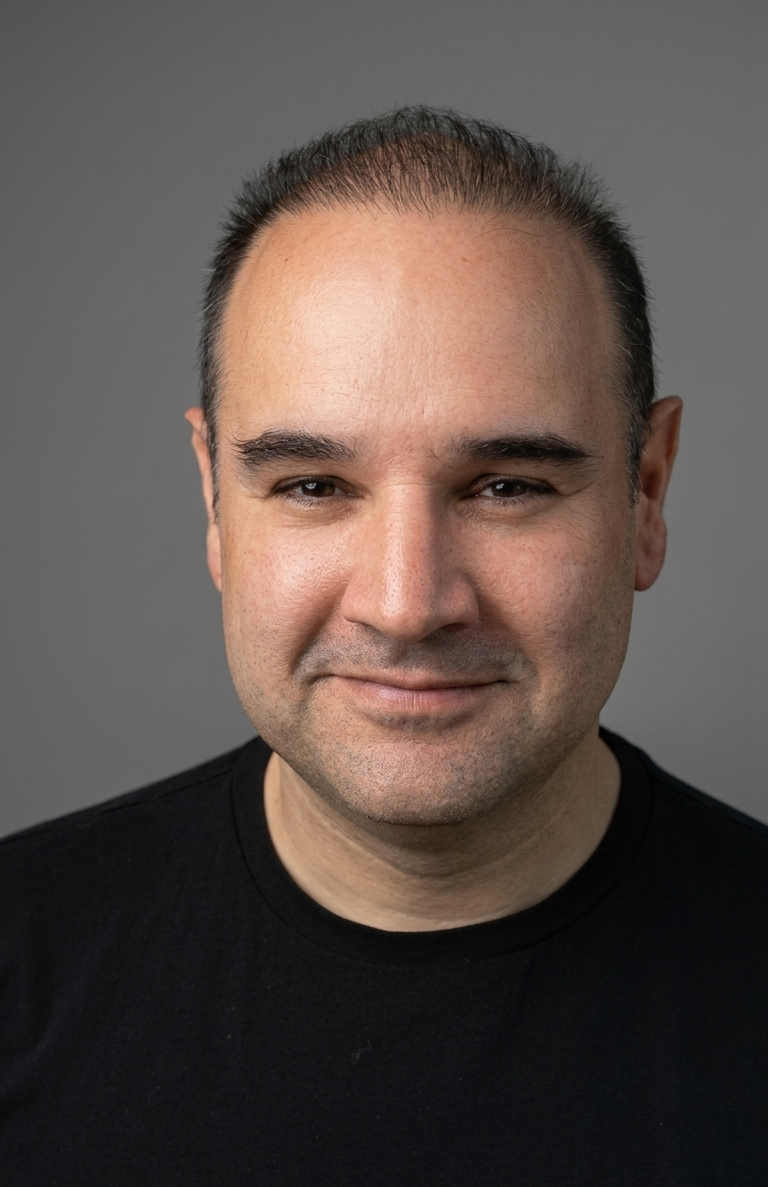
- Born: 1978 (age 47–48); Germany
- Occupations: Film and television producer
- Known for: Co-founder of Pantaleon Films; Friendship!; You Are Wanted; Army of Thieves

Marco Beckmann (born 1978) is a German film and television producer and co-founder of Pantaleon Films GmbH. His productions have been distributed by Warner Bros., Netflix, Amazon MGM Studios, 20th Century Fox, and Sony Pictures. He is a member of the Deutsche Filmakademie (German Film Academy).

== Career ==
=== Pantaleon Films (2009–2013) ===
Beckmann co-founded Pantaleon Films in Munich in 2009 with Matthias Schweighöfer and Dan Maag.

His first co-production was Friendship! (2010), distributed by Sony Pictures. It became the highest-grossing German film of 2010.

In 2011, he produced What a Man (20th Century Fox), which opened at #1 in Germany and set the record for the most successful opening weekend of any German film in the history of 20th Century Fox Germany. In 2013, he produced The Break Up Man, which won the German Film Award Audience Award, a Bambi Award, and the Romy Award.

=== Streaming series (2017–2018) ===
In 2017, Beckmann produced You Are Wanted, the first German-language original series for Amazon Prime Video. The series was released simultaneously in more than 200 countries and territories, marking the largest global launch of a German television production at the time. Beckmann received a Romy Award Special Prize of the Jury in 2019 for the series.

=== Netflix and international productions (2020–2022) ===
In 2020, Beckmann produced Resistance, starring Jesse Eisenberg, and The Last Word for Netflix, which won the German Television Award for Best Comedy Series.

In 2021, he was executive producer on Army of Thieves (Netflix), which reached #1 in more than 90 countries.

In 2022, he produced Oskars Kleid (Oskar's Dress), which won a Bambi Award in 2023.

=== Amazon MGM Studios (2025–present) ===
In 2025, Beckmann produced The Tank (Der Tiger) for Amazon MGM Studios. It was the first German Amazon original to receive a theatrical release before streaming, and later became the most-streamed original German film on Prime Video, reaching #1 in 28 countries. The New York Times selected it as one of five recommended action films to stream in January 2026, and The Daily Telegraph described it as "potentially the greatest tank film ever made."

Also in 2025, he produced The Life of Wishes, which had its world premiere in the Gala Premieres section of the Zurich Film Festival, and No Hit Wonder, which premiered at the International Film Festival Rotterdam and sold a French remake at Cannes.

== Awards and recognition ==
- German Film Award (Lola) – Audience Award: The Break Up Man (2013)
- Bambi Award – Best National Film: The Break Up Man (2013); Oskar's Dress (2022)
- German Television Award – Best Comedy Series: The Last Word (2021)
- Romy Award – Best Film: The Break Up Man (2013); Special Prize: You Are Wanted (2019)
- Bavarian Film Award – Best Actor (Florian David Fitz): Oskar's Dress (2022)
- Busan International Film Festival – Busan Bank Award: Highway to Hellas (2015)
- Giffoni Film Festival – Gryphon Award (Generator +18): Auerhaus (2020)
- German Film Evaluation Board (FBW) – Prädikat besonders wertvoll (Seal of Excellence): Resistance (2020), Auerhaus (2019), Oskar's Dress (2022)

== Industry affiliations ==
Beckmann is a member of the Deutsche Filmakademie.

== Filmography (selected) ==
=== Feature films ===
Year	Title	Role	Distributor / Platform	Notes
2010	Friendship!	Co-Producer	Sony Pictures	Highest-grossing German film of 2010
2011	What a Man	Producer	20th Century Fox	Record opening weekend for Fox Germany
2013	The Break Up Man	Producer	20th Century Fox	Won Lola, Bambi, Romy awards
2015	Highway to Hellas	Producer	Warner Bros.	Won Busan Bank Award (BIFF 2015)
2019	Auerhaus	Producer	Warner Bros.	Won Giffoni Film Festival Gryphon Award; FBW Seal of Excellence
2020	Resistance	Producer	Warner Bros.	Premiered at Miami Film Festival; FBW Seal of Excellence
2021	Army of Thieves	Executive Producer	Netflix	#1 on Netflix in 90+ countries
2022	Oskar's Dress	Producer	Warner Bros.	Won Bambi Award, Bavarian Film Award; FBW Seal of Excellence
2025	No Hit Wonder	Producer	Warner Bros.	Premiered at IFFR; French remake deal at Cannes
2025	The Tank	Producer	Amazon Prime Video	#1 on Prime Video in 28 countries; recommended by The New York Times

=== Television and streaming ===
Year	Title	Role	Platform	Notes
2017–18	You Are Wanted	Producer	Amazon Prime Video	First German-language Amazon Original; released in 200+ countries
2020	The Last Word	Producer	Netflix	Won German Television Award for Best Comedy Series
