= Dan Maag =

German film producer (born 1975)

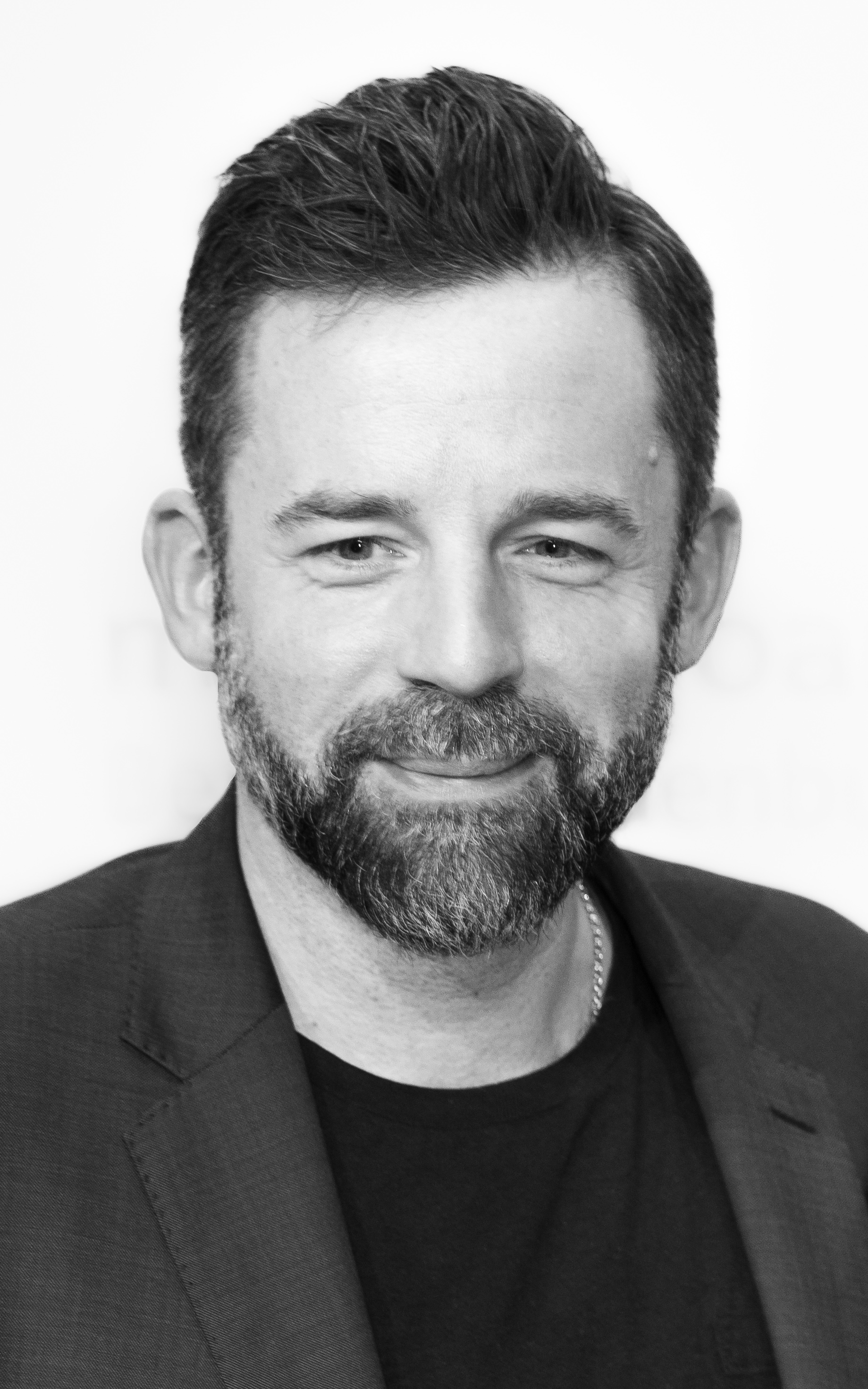
Dan Maag, 2019

Dan Maag (born 19 March 1975 in Mettmann, Germany) is a German film producer.

== Filmography ==
Producer

- Josephine (2000)
- Seven Days to Live (2000) (co-producer)
- Eine Hochzeit und (k)ein Todesfall (2001) (co-producer)
- Et kütt wie et kütt (2002) (co-producer)
- Dead Fish (2004)
- The Aviator (2004) (line producer: IMF)
- Showdebola (2005)
- Basic Instinct 2 (2006) (line producer: IMF)
- RV (2006) (line producer: IMF)
- Open Water 2 (2006)
- The Red Baron (2007)
- What a Man (2011)
- Break Up Man (2013)
- Frau Ella (2013)
- Joy of Fatherhood (2014)
- The Manny (2015)
- Highway To Hellas (2015)
- The Most Beautiful Day (2016)
- Hot Dog (2018)
- 100 Things (2018)
- Abikalypse (2019)
- Commitment Phobia (film) (2021)
- Army of Thieves (2021)

Executive producer

- Deathwatch (2002)

Other credits

- Bang Boom Bang (1999) (production assistant)
- Biikenbrennen – Der Fluch des Meeres (1999) (production assistant)
- Kanak Attack (2000) (post-production manager)
- Alexander (2004) (production executive)
