= Matthias Schweighöfer =

German actor

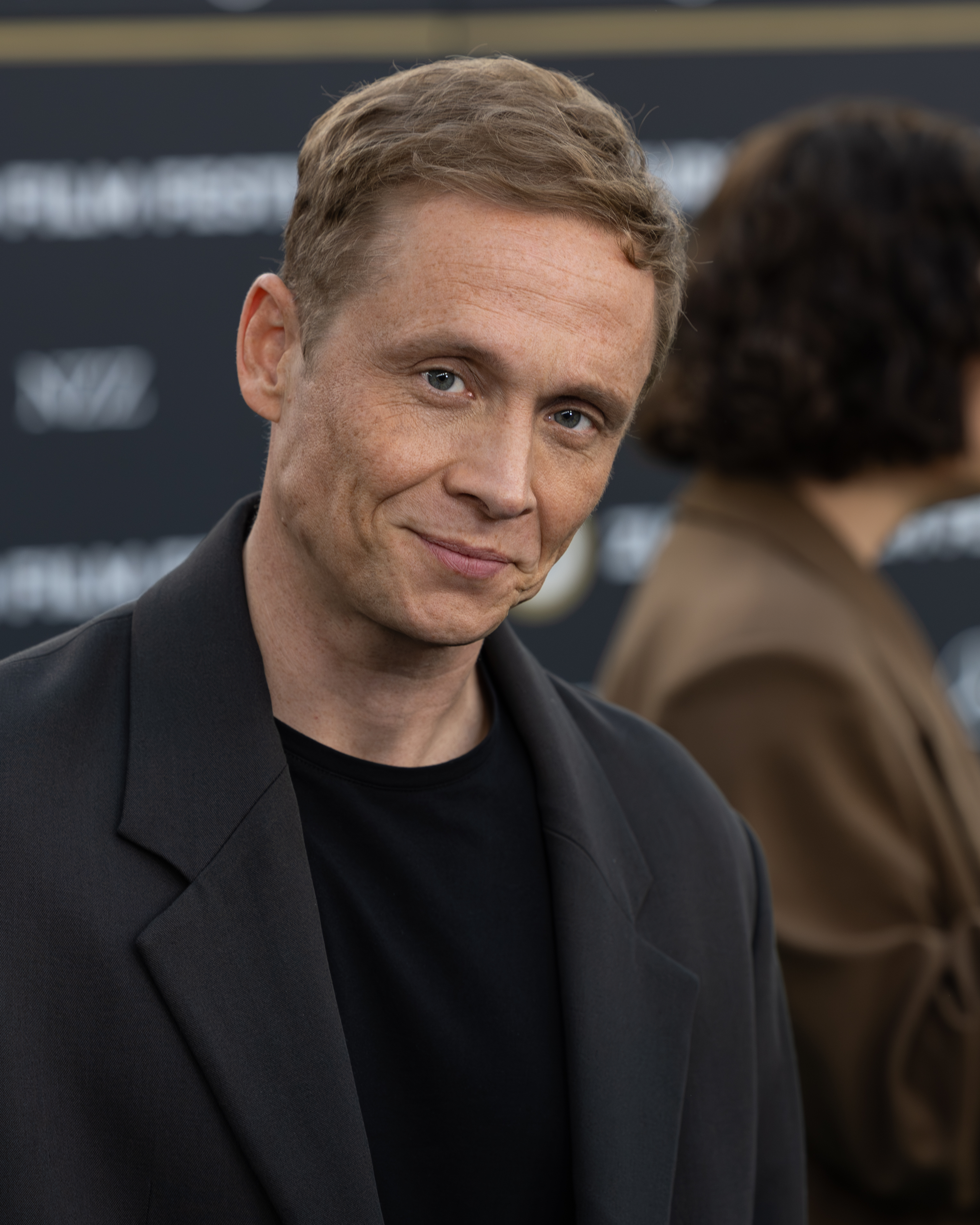
- Schweighöfer at the 2025 Zurich Film Festival
- Born: 11 March 1981 (age 45); Anklam, East Germany
- Occupations: Actor; filmmaker
- Years active: 1997–present
- Spouse: Ruby O. Fee (m. 2026)
- Partner: Ani Schromm (2004–2018)
- Children: 2

Matthias Schweighöfer (German: [maˈtiːas ˈʃvaɪkˌhøːfɐ]; born 11 March 1981) is a German actor and filmmaker known for his work in several German and American film productions. He appeared as Lieutenant Franz Herber in the 2008 film Valkyrie. In 2021, Schweighöfer appeared in the Netflix film Army of the Dead, directed by Zack Snyder, as Ludwig Dieter. He reprised his role in the prequel film, Army of Thieves, which he also directed. In 2023, he appeared in the role of German theoretical physicist Werner Heisenberg in Christopher Nolan's biographical thriller, Oppenheimer, about J. Robert Oppenheimer and the development of the atomic bomb during World War II.

== Career ==
The son of actors. Schweighöfer's first role in a feature film was Changing Skins (1997), directed by Andreas Dresen. In the following years, he appeared in projects such as Soloalbum (2003), Off Beat (2004), Eight Miles High (2007) and Rabbit Without Ears. Schweighöfer portrayed Lieutenant Franz Herber in Valkyrie, a 2008 film dramatizing the failed 20 July assassination and political coup plot to kill Adolf Hitler. The international release of Valkyrie and the all-star cast (including Tom Cruise, Kenneth Branagh, Terence Stamp and Bill Nighy) not only allowed Schweighöfer to be recognized abroad, it provided an opportunity for him to be cast in other English speaking roles.

In 2009, Schweighöfer founded the fashion label German Garment with TV presenter Joko Winterscheidt.

In 2010, he made his debut as film director with the romantic comedy What a Man, followed in 2013 by his second movie Break Up Man. In 2017, he directed, produced and played the lead role in You Are Wanted, Amazon Studios' first non-English-language TV series.

In 2021, Schweighöfer appeared in the Netflix film Army of the Dead, directed by Zack Snyder, as Ludwig Dieter. He reprised his role in the prequel film, Army of Thieves, which he also directed.

In 2021/2022, he took on the role of music producer Frank Farian in the biopic Girl You Know It's True about the scandalous pop duo Milli Vanilli, written and directed by Simon Verhoeven, produced by Wiedemann & Berg Film. The film was released theatrically by Leonine in December 2023.

In 2023, he portrayed physicist Werner Heisenberg in the Christopher Nolan biopic Oppenheimer.

== Personal life ==
Between 2004 and 2012, Schweighöfer dated Ani Schromm, and they got together again in the summer of 2013. They have a daughter born in 2009 and a son born in 2014. Schweighöfer and Schromm later separated, and as of 2018 Schweighöfer has been in a relationship with his Army of Thieves co-star Ruby O. Fee. The couple were married in January 2026. Schweighöfer lives in Berlin.

== Awards ==
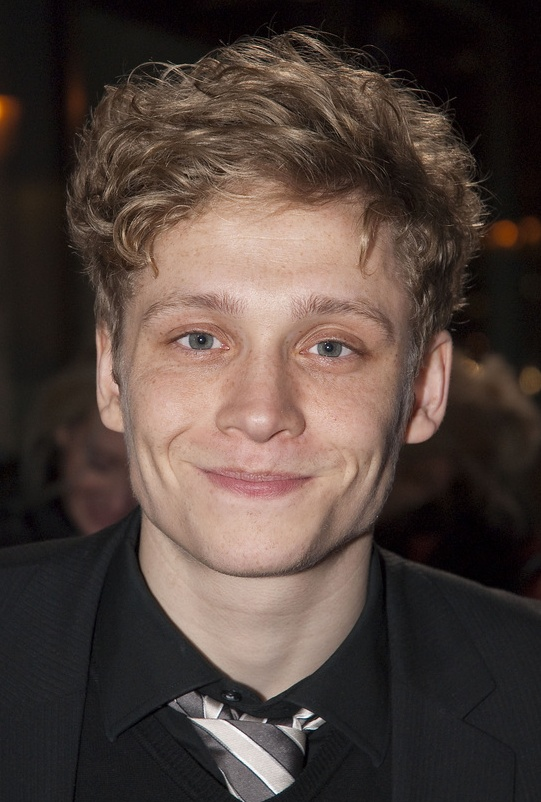
Schweighöfer at the Berlinale 2008

- 2000: German Television Prize – Promotional Award for the performance in Verbotenes Verlangen
- 2002: Günter Strack TV Award – Best Young Actor for the performance in Tatort - Gewaltfieber
- 2003: Golden Camera – "Curt Jürgens Memorial Camera" for best newcomer and performances in Friends of Friends & Soloalbum
- 2003: Adolf Grimme Award – For the performance in Friends of Friends
- 2003: New Faces Award – Best Actor
- 2004: Bavarian Film Award – Best Young Actor
- 2004: Baden-Baden TV and Film Festival – Special award for the outstanding performances in Baal and Cold Spring
- 2005: Undine Award – Best Young Actor (TV) for the performance in The Young Schiller
- 2006: DIVA-Award – Best Actor for the performances in Kammerflimmern, The Young Schiller and Polly Blue Eyes
- 2007: Undine Award – Best Young Actor (feature film) for the performance in Eight Miles High
- 2007: Bambi Award – Film – National – Male
- 2009: Golden Camera – Best German Actor for the performance in The Author of Himself: The Life of Marcel Reich-Ranicki
- 2010: Jupiter Award – Best Male Actor (TV) for his performance in The Author of Himself: The Life of Marcel Reich-Ranicki
- 2011: GQ Man of the Year – Film National

== Selected filmography ==
Director

| Year | Title | Director | Producer | Writer |
|---|---|---|---|---|
| 2011 | What a Man | Yes | Yes | Yes |
| 2013 | Break Up Man | Yes | Yes | No |
| 2014 | Joy of Fatherhood | Yes | Yes | Yes |
| 2015 | The Manny | Yes | Yes | Yes |
| 2017 | You Are Wanted | Yes | Yes | No |
| 2021 | Army of Thieves | Yes | Yes | No |

Actor

- 1999: Dr. Stefan Frank, season 4, episode 10, als Ingo
- 2000: Taboo (Verbotenes Verlangen – Ich liebe meinen Schüler), as Ben Simon
- 2000: Trust Me (Freunde), as Speedy
- 2001: Babykram ist Männersache, as Malte
- 2001: Heart Over Head (Herz im Kopf), as Dirk
- 2002: At Night in the Park (Nachts im Park), as Hansen
- 2002: Friends of Friends (TV film), as Gregor
- 2002: FeardotCom, as Dieter Schrader
- 2003: Soloalbum (Soloalbum), as Ben
- 2003: Die Klasse von '99, as Felix
- 2004: Baal (TV film), as Baal
- 2004: Cold Spring (Kalter Frühling, TV film), as Ben
- 2004: Off Beat (Kammerflimmern), as Crash
- 2004: Gold – The Tulse Luper Suitcases
- 2005: The Young Schiller (TV film), as Friedrich Schiller
- 2005: Polly Blue Eyes, as Ronny Helske
- 2006: Lulu (TV film), as Jack the Ripper
- 2007: Eight Miles High (Das wilde Leben), as Rainer Langhans
- 2007: An Old Maid (TV film), as Felix
- 2007: Fata Morgana, as Daniel
- 2007: Rabbit Without Ears, as Moritz
- 2008: The Red Baron (Der rote Baron), as Manfred von Richthofen
- 2008: The Architect, as Jan Winter
- 2008: Valkyrie, as Lieutenant Herber
- 2009: The Author of Himself: The Life of Marcel Reich-Ranicki (TV film), as Marcel Reich-Ranicki
- 2009: Night Train, as Frankie
- 2009: 12 Paces Without a Head, as Gottfried Michaelsen
- 2009: Rabbit Without Ears 2, as Moritz
- 2010: Friendship!, as Tom
- 2011: What a Man, as Alex Nowak
- 2011: Woman in Love, as Alexander Honk
- 2012: Russian Disco, as Wladimir
- 2013: Break Up Man, as Paul Voigt
- 2013: Frau Ella, as Sascha
- 2013: Kokowääh 2, as himself
- 2014: Joy of Fatherhood, as Felix
- 2015: The Little Prince, as the Fox (German version)
- 2015: The Manny, as Clemens
- 2016: The Most Beautiful Day, as Andi
- 2016: Vier gegen die Bank, as Max
- 2017: The Price, as Jonas
- 2017: You Are Wanted (TV series), as Lukas Franke
- 2018: Hot Dog, as Theo
- 2018: A Jar Full of Life, as Erik Ruge
- 2018: 100 Things, as Toni Katz
- 2018: Kursk, as Pavel
- 2019: Playmobil: The Movie, as Rex Dasher (German version)
- 2020: Resistance, as Klaus Barbie
- 2021: Army of the Dead, as Ludwig Dieter
- 2021: Army of Thieves, as Ludwig Dieter/Sebastian Schlencht-Wöhnert
- 2022: The Swimmers, as Sven
- 2022: Hinterland, as Josef Severin
- 2023: Oppenheimer, as Werner Heisenberg
- 2023: Heart of Stone
- 2023: Family Switch, as Rolf
- 2023: Girl You Know It's True, as Frank Farian
- 2025: Elio, as Ambassador Tegmen (English and German versions)
- 2025: Amrum, as Theo
- 2025: Brick, as Tim
- 2027: The Conjuring: First Communion, as TBA
- TBA: Play Dead, as TBA

== Theatre ==
- 2004: One, Two, Three – Otto Ludwig Pfiffl, Hebbel Theatre, Berlin
- 2007: North, directed by Frank Castorf, Volksbühne, Berlin

== Audiobooks ==
- 2008: Slam by Nick Hornby, ISBN 978-3867178600
- 2008: Die Traumnovelle by Arthur Schnitzler, ISBN 978-3829122092
