= Lists of Warner Bros. films =

The following are lists of Warner Bros. films by decade:

Note: These lists do not include direct-to-video releases or films from New Line Cinema prior to its merger with Warner Bros. in 2008, nor does it include third-party films or films Warner gained the rights to as a result of mergers or acquisitions such as Metro-Goldwyn-Mayer's pre-May 1986 library, RKO Radio Pictures' library or Paramount Pictures' library. The pre-1950 films distribution rights are held by Turner Entertainment Co.

== Lists ==
- List of Warner Bros. films (1918–1929)
- List of Warner Bros. films (1930–1939)
- List of Warner Bros. films (1940–1949)
- List of Warner Bros. films (1950–1959)
- List of Warner Bros. films (1960–1969)
- List of Warner Bros. films (1970–1979)
- List of Warner Bros. films (1980–1989)
- List of Warner Bros. films (1990–1999)
- List of Warner Bros. films (2000–2009)
- List of Warner Bros. films (2010–2019)
- List of Warner Bros. films (2020–2029)

=== International releases ===
- List of Warner Bros. International films (1990–1999)
- List of Warner Bros. International films (2000–2009)
- List of Warner Bros. International films (2010–2019)
- List of Warner Bros. International films (2020–2029)
