= List of Warner Bros. films (1930–1939) =

This is a list of films produced, co-produced, and/or distributed by Warner Bros. Pictures, Inc. and also its subsidiary First National Pictures in the 1930s. From 1928 to 1936, films by First National continued to be credited solely to "First National Pictures". In July 1936, stockholders of First National Pictures, Inc. (primarily Warner Bros.) voted to dissolve the corporation and no further separate First National Pictures were made. This list does not include third-party films or films Warner gained the rights to as a result of mergers or acquisitions.

== Key ==
^{(Lost)}	Considered to be a lost film.
^{(in danger of being Lost)}	Considered to be a film in danger of being lost.

== 1930s ==
=== 1930 ===
Release date	Title	Notes
January 4, 1930	Second Choice	Lost film
January 5, 1930	Lilies of the Field	distribution only; produced by First National Pictures; Lost film
January 19, 1930	Playing Around	distribution only; produced by First National Pictures
January 26, 1930	In the Next Room	distribution only; produced by First National Pictures; Lost film
February 1, 1930	Wide Open	
February 2, 1930	Loose Ankles	distribution only; produced by First National Pictures
February 9, 1930	The Other Tomorrow	distribution only; produced by First National Pictures; Lost film
February 15, 1930	She Couldn't Say No	Lost film
February 16, 1930	No, No, Nanette	distribution only; produced by First National Pictures; Part Technicolor; Lost film
March 1, 1930	Isle of Escape	Lost film
March 2, 1930	Strictly Modern	distribution only; produced by First National Pictures; Lost film
March 8, 1930	The Green Goddess	
March 9, 1930	Son of the Gods	distribution only; produced by First National Pictures; Part Technicolor; Extant only in black and white
March 15, 1930	Song of the West	All Technicolor; Lost film
March 15, 1930	On the Border	
March 16, 1930	The Furies	distribution only; produced by First National Pictures; Lost film
April 1, 1930	Under a Texas Moon	All Technicolor; Extant at UCLA
April 6, 1930	Murder Will Out	distribution only; produced by First National Pictures; Lost film
April 13, 1930	Spring Is Here	distribution only; produced by First National Pictures
April 19, 1930	Those Who Dance	
April 20, 1930	Showgirl in Hollywood	distribution only; produced by First National Pictures; Part Technicolor; Extant only in black and white
April 26, 1930	The Second Floor Mystery	
May 1, 1930	Hold Everything	All Technicolor; Lost film Soundtrack extant
May 4, 1930	A Notorious Affair	distribution only; produced by First National Pictures
May 5, 1930	The Man Hunter	Lost film
May 10, 1930	Dumbbells in Ermine	Lost film
May 11, 1930	The Flirting Widow	distribution only; produced by First National Pictures
May 24, 1930	The Man from Blankley's	Lost film (fragments extant)
May 25, 1930	Song of the Flame	distribution only; produced by First National Pictures; All Technicolor; Lost film
May 31, 1930	Mammy	Technicolor sequences
June 1, 1930	Back Pay	distribution only; produced by First National Pictures
June 7, 1930	Courage	Lost film
June 7, 1930	Rough Waters	Lost film
June 14, 1930	Golden Dawn	All Technicolor; Extant only in black and white
June 15, 1930	Sweethearts and Wives	distribution only; produced by First National Pictures
June 22, 1930	Bride of the Regiment	distribution only; produced by First National Pictures; All Technicolor; Lost film
July 6, 1930	Sweet Mama	distribution only; produced by First National Pictures
July 8, 1930	Recaptured Love	
July 20, 1930	Road to Paradise	distribution only; produced by First National Pictures
August 9, 1930	Sweet Kitty Bellairs	All Technicolor; Extant only in black and white
July 19, 1930	Dancing Sweeties	
July 26, 1930	Three Faces East	
August 2, 1930	The Matrimonial Bed	
August 6, 1930	Numbered Men	distribution only; produced by First National Pictures
August 10, 1930	The Dawn Patrol	distribution only; produced by First National Pictures
August 16, 1930	Oh Sailor Behave	
August 23, 1930	The Office Wife	
August 24, 1930	Top Speed	distribution only; produced by First National Pictures
September 7, 1930	The Way of All Men	distribution only; produced by First National Pictures; Lost film
September 11, 1930	Big Boy	
September 13, 1930	Moby Dick	
September 15, 1930	The Bad Man	distribution only; produced by First National Pictures; Unpreserved nitrate print at UCLA; in danger of being lost
September 21, 1930	Bright Lights	distribution only; produced by First National Pictures; All Technicolor; Extant only in black and white (color fragments at LOC)
September 27, 1930	Old English	
September 28, 1930	Scarlet Pages	distribution only; produced by First National Pictures
October 4, 1930	Maybe It's Love	
October 5, 1930	College Lovers	distribution only; produced by First National Pictures; Lost film
October 11, 1930	Sinners' Holiday	
October 12, 1930	The Girl of the Golden West	distribution only; produced by First National Pictures; Lost film
October 18, 1930	The Doorway to Hell	
October 19, 1930	The Truth About Youth	distribution only; produced by First National Pictures
October 25, 1930	The Life of the Party	All Technicolor; Extant only in black and white
October 30, 1930	Kismet	distribution only; produced by First National Pictures; Lost film
November 1, 1930	A Soldier's Plaything	
November 1, 1930	River's End	
November 2, 1930	The Gorilla	distribution only; produced by First National Pictures; Lost film
November 9, 1930	Sunny	distribution only; produced by First National Pictures
November 19, 1930	Call of the Sea	British production Distribution only
November 23, 1930	The Widow from Chicago	distribution only; produced by First National Pictures
November 29, 1930	Outward Bound	
November 30, 1930	One Night at Susie's	distribution only; produced by First National Pictures
December 6, 1930	Man to Man	
December 7, 1930	Mothers Cry	distribution only; produced by First National Pictures
December 13, 1930	Divorce Among Friends	
December 14, 1930	The Lash	distribution only; produced by First National Pictures
December 21, 1930	Going Wild	distribution only; produced by First National Pictures
December 27, 1930	Captain Thunder	

=== 1931 ===
Release date	Title	Notes
January 3, 1931	Viennese Nights	All Technicolor; Extant at UCLA
January 9, 1931	Little Caesar	distribution only; produced by First National Pictures; Inducted into the National Film Registry in 2000
January 11, 1931	The Naughty Flirt	distribution only; produced by First National Pictures
January 17, 1931	Other Men's Women	
January 31, 1931	Captain Applejack	
February 7, 1931	The Right of Way	distribution only; produced by First National Pictures
February 14, 1931	Illicit	
February 21, 1931	Kiss Me Again	distribution only; produced by First National Pictures; All Technicolor; Extant only in black and white
February 28, 1931	Sit Tight	
March 7, 1931	Father's Son	distribution only; produced by First National Pictures
March 21, 1931	Fifty Million Frenchmen	All Technicolor; Extant only in black and white
March 28, 1931	The Hot Heiress	distribution only; produced by First National Pictures
April 4, 1931	Woman Hungry	distribution only; produced by First National Pictures; All Technicolor; Lost film
April 11, 1931	The Finger Points	distribution only; produced by First National Pictures
April 18, 1931	Misbehaving Ladies	distribution only; produced by First National Pictures
April 25, 1931	God's Gift to Women	
April 29, 1931	Svengali	
May 8, 1931	Too Young to Marry	distribution only; produced by First National Pictures
May 14, 1931	My Past	
May 15, 1931	The Millionaire	
May 22, 1931	The Public Enemy	Inducted into the National Film Registry in 1998.
May 29, 1931	The Lady Who Dared	distribution only; produced by First National Pictures
June 6, 1931	Party Husband	distribution only; produced by First National Pictures
June 13, 1931	The Maltese Falcon	
June 20, 1931	Men of the Sky	distribution only; produced by First National Pictures; Lost film
June 27, 1931	Gold Dust Gertie	
July 4, 1931	Big Business Girl	distribution only; produced by First National Pictures
July 11, 1931	Smart Money	
July 18, 1931	Chances	distribution only; produced by First National Pictures
July 25, 1931	Children of Dreams	Lost film
August 1, 1931	Broadminded	distribution only; produced by First National Pictures
August 6, 1931	Stranger in Town	
August 8, 1931	Night Nurse	
August 15, 1931	The Reckless Hour	distribution only; produced by First National Pictures
August 21, 1931	The Star Witness	
August 22, 1931	Bought!	
August 29, 1931	The Last Flight	distribution only; produced by First National Pictures
September 5, 1931	The Bargain	distribution only; produced by First National Pictures
September 12, 1931	Alexander Hamilton	
September 12, 1931	I Like Your Nerve	distribution only; produced by First National Pictures
September 19, 1931	Side Show	
September 26, 1931	Five Star Final	distribution only; produced by First National Pictures
October 3, 1931	Penrod and Sam	distribution only; produced by First National Pictures
October 10, 1931	The Road to Singapore	
October 17, 1931	Honor of the Family	distribution only; produced by First National Pictures; Lost film
October 24, 1931	Expensive Women	
October 31, 1931	The Ruling Voice	distribution only; produced by First National Pictures
November 7, 1931	The Mad Genius	
November 14, 1931	Blonde Crazy	
November 28, 1931	Local Boy Makes Good	distribution only; produced by First National Pictures
December 5, 1931	Compromised	distribution only; produced by First National Pictures; Lost film
December 12, 1931	Safe in Hell	distribution only; produced by First National Pictures
December 24, 1931	Manhattan Parade	All Technicolor; Extant only in black and white
December 24, 1931	Under Eighteen	
December 26, 1931	Her Majesty, Love	distribution only; produced by First National Pictures

=== 1932 ===
Release date	Title	Notes
January 9, 1932	The Woman from Monte Carlo	distribution only; produced by First National Pictures
January 14, 1932	Union Depot	distribution only; produced by First National Pictures
January 23, 1932	Taxi!	
January 30, 1932	High Pressure	
February 6, 1932	The Hatchet Man	distribution only; produced by First National Pictures
February 19, 1932	The Man Who Played God	
February 20, 1932	Fireman, Save My Child	distribution only; produced by First National Pictures
February 20, 1932	A Fool's Advice	US theatrical distribution only; produced by Frank Fay Production
March 5, 1932	The Expert	
March 12, 1932	Play-Girl	
March 26, 1932	Alias the Doctor	distribution only; produced by First National Pictures
March 26, 1932	The Heart of New York	
April 2, 1932	It's Tough to Be Famous	distribution only; produced by First National Pictures
April 9, 1932	Beauty and the Boss	
April 16, 1932	The Crowd Roars	
April 23, 1932	Man Wanted	
April 30, 1932	So Big	
May 7, 1932	The Mouthpiece	
May 14, 1932	The Famous Ferguson Case	distribution only; produced by First National Pictures
May 21, 1932	The Rich Are Always with Us	distribution only; produced by First National Pictures
May 23, 1932	The Tenderfoot	distribution only; produced by First National Pictures
May 28, 1932	The Strange Love of Molly Louvain	distribution only; produced by First National Pictures
May 28, 1932	Two Seconds	distribution only; produced by First National Pictures
June 4, 1932	Street of Women	
June 8, 1932	The Dark Horse	distribution only; produced by First National Pictures
June 18, 1932	Love Is a Racket	distribution only; produced by First National Pictures
June 18, 1932	Week-End Marriage	distribution only; produced by First National Pictures
July 16, 1932	Winner Take All	
July 23, 1932	The Purchase Price	
July 30, 1932	Miss Pinkerton	distribution only; produced by First National Pictures
August 13, 1932	Jewel Robbery	
August 20, 1932	Crooner	distribution only; produced by First National Pictures
August 27, 1932	Doctor X	distribution only; produced by First National Pictures; All Technicolor
August 27, 1932	Ride Him, Cowboy	
September 3, 1932	Two Against the World	
September 10, 1932	Big City Blues	
September 10, 1932	Blessed Event	
September 10, 1932	Life Begins	distribution only; produced by First National Pictures
September 17, 1932	A Successful Calamity	
September 24, 1932	Tiger Shark	distribution only; produced by First National Pictures
September 29, 1932	Illegal	
October 8, 1932	The Big Stampede	
October 9, 1932	The Crash	distribution only; produced by First National Pictures
October 15, 1932	The Cabin in the Cotton	distribution only; produced by First National Pictures
October 22, 1932	One Way Passage	
October 29, 1932	Three on a Match	distribution only; produced by First National Pictures
November 5, 1932	They Call It Sin	distribution only; produced by First National Pictures
November 12, 1932	Scarlet Dawn	
November 19, 1932	I Am a Fugitive from a Chain Gang	Inducted into the National Film Registry in 1991
December 8, 1932	You Said a Mouthful	distribution only; produced by First National Pictures
December 10, 1932	Central Park	distribution only; produced by First National Pictures
December 17, 1932	Haunted Gold	
December 24, 1932	20,000 Years in Sing Sing	distribution only; produced by First National Pictures
December 24, 1932	Silver Dollar	distribution only; produced by First National Pictures
December 30, 1932	Frisco Jenny	distribution only; produced by First National Pictures
December 31, 1932	The Match King	distribution only; produced by First National Pictures

=== 1933 ===
Release date	Title	Notes
January 7, 1933	Lawyer Man	
January 28, 1933	Hard to Handle	
January 28, 1933	Parachute Jumper	
February 4, 1933	Ladies They Talk About	
February 11, 1933	Employees' Entrance	distribution only; produced by First National Pictures; Inducted into the National Film Registry in 2019
February 18, 1933	Mystery of the Wax Museum	All Technicolor
February 25, 1933	The King's Vacation	
March 1, 1933	Blondie Johnson	distribution only; produced by First National Pictures
March 4, 1933	Girl Missing	
March 8, 1933	42nd Street	Inducted into the National Film Registry in 2003
March 18, 1933	Grand Slam	distribution only; produced by First National Pictures
March 18, 1933	The Telegraph Trail	
March 25, 1933	The Keyhole	
April 1, 1933	The Mind Reader	distribution only; produced by First National Pictures
April 8, 1933	Untamed Africa	
April 15, 1933	Central Airport	distribution only; produced by First National Pictures
April 20, 1933	The Working Man	
April 29, 1933	Elmer, the Great	distribution only; produced by First National Pictures
May 6, 1933	Picture Snatcher	
May 13, 1933	Lilly Turner	distribution only; produced by First National Pictures
May 15, 1933	Ex-Lady	
May 20, 1933	The Little Giant	distribution only; produced by First National Pictures
May 27, 1933	Gold Diggers of 1933	Inducted into the National Film Registry in 2003.
May 27, 1933	Somewhere in Sonora	
June 3, 1933	The Life of Jimmy Dolan	
June 10, 1933	Private Detective 62	
June 10, 1933	The Silk Express	
June 17, 1933	Heroes for Sale	distribution only; produced by First National Pictures
June 24, 1933	The Mayor of Hell	
July 1, 1933	Baby Face	Inducted into the National Film Registry in 2005
July 8, 1933	The Narrow Corner	
July 15, 1933	She Had to Say Yes	distribution only; produced by First National Pictures
July 15, 1933	The Man from Monterey	
July 22, 1933	Mary Stevens, M.D.	
August 5, 1933	Voltaire	
August 19, 1933	Captured!	
September 9, 1933	Goodbye Again	distribution only; produced by First National Pictures
September 16, 1933	Bureau of Missing Persons	distribution only; produced by First National Pictures
September 23, 1933	I Loved a Woman	distribution only; produced by First National Pictures
October 7, 1933	Wild Boys of the Road	distribution only; produced by First National Pictures; Inducted into the National Film Registry in 2013
October 21, 1933	Footlight Parade	Inducted into the National Film Registry in 1992
October 28, 1933	The Kennel Murder Case	
October 28, 1933	Ever in My Heart	
November 4, 1933	College Coach	
November 11, 1933	Female	distribution only; produced by First National Pictures
November 16, 1933	From Headquarters	
November 18, 1933	Havana Widows	distribution only; produced by First National Pictures
November 25, 1933	The World Changes	distribution only; produced by First National Pictures
December 3, 1933	Lady Killer	
December 14, 1933	Convention City	distribution only; produced by First National Pictures; Lost film
December 23, 1933	The House on 56th Street	
December 23, 1933	Son of a Sailor	distribution only; produced by First National Pictures

=== 1934 ===
Release date	Title	Notes
January 6, 1934	The Big Shakedown	distribution only; produced by First National Pictures
January 13, 1934	Easy to Love	
January 20, 1934	Hi, Nellie!	
January 20, 1934	Massacre	distribution only; produced by First National Pictures
January 27, 1934	Bedside	distribution only; produced by First National Pictures
February 3, 1934	Dark Hazard	distribution only; produced by First National Pictures
February 10, 1934	Mandalay	distribution only; produced by First National Pictures
February 14, 1934	As the Earth Turns	
February 14, 1934	Fashions of 1934	distribution only; produced by First National Pictures
February 24, 1934	I've Got Your Number	
March 3, 1934	Heat Lightning	
March 10, 1934	Jimmy the Gent	
March 10, 1934	Journal of a Crime	distribution only; produced by First National Pictures
March 17, 1934	Wonder Bar	distribution only; produced by First National Pictures
April 7, 1934	Registered Nurse	distribution only; produced by First National Pictures
April 7, 1934	Harold Teen	
April 21, 1934	A Modern Hero	
April 28, 1934	Upperworld	
May 5, 1934	A Very Honorable Guy	
May 12, 1934	Merry Wives of Reno	
May 19, 1934	Smarty	
May 26, 1934	Twenty Million Sweethearts	distribution only; produced by First National Pictures
May 26, 1934	The Merry Frinks	distribution only; produced by First National Pictures
June 2, 1934	Fog Over Frisco	distribution only; produced by First National Pictures
June 9, 1934	The Key	
June 16, 1934	He Was Her Man	
June 23, 1934	Dr. Monica	
June 30, 1934	The Circus Clown	distribution only; produced by First National Pictures
July 7, 1934	Return of the Terror	distribution only; produced by First National Pictures; Prequel to The Terror (1928)
July 7, 1934	The Personality Kid	
July 14, 1934	Midnight Alibi	distribution only; produced by First National Pictures
July 14, 1934	Side Streets	distribution only; produced by First National Pictures
July 21, 1934	Here Comes the Navy	
July 28, 1934	Friends of Mr. Sweeney	
August 4, 1934	The Man with Two Faces	distribution only; produced by First National Pictures
August 11, 1934	Housewife	
August 25, 1934	The Dragon Murder Case	distribution only; produced by First National Pictures
September 1, 1934	Dames	
September 8, 1934	Desirable	
September 15, 1934	British Agent	distribution only; produced by First National Pictures
September 19, 1934	A Lost Lady	
September 22, 1934	The Case of the Howling Dog	distribution only; produced by First National Pictures
October 6, 1934	Big Hearted Herbert	
October 13, 1934	Kansas City Princess	
October 13, 1934	Madame Du Barry	
October 20, 1934	6 Day Bike Rider	distribution only; produced by First National Pictures
October 20, 1934	I Sell Anything	distribution only; produced by First National Pictures
October 27, 1934	Happiness Ahead	distribution only; produced by First National Pictures
November 3, 1934	The Firebird	
November 10, 1934	The St. Louis Kid	
November 17, 1934	Gentlemen Are Born	distribution only; produced by First National Pictures
November 24, 1934	I Am a Thief	
November 28, 1934	Flirtation Walk	distribution only; produced by First National Pictures
December 8, 1934	Babbitt	distribution only; produced by First National Pictures
December 15, 1934	The Church Mouse	distribution only; produced by First National Pictures
December 15, 1934	Murder In The Clouds	distribution only; produced by First National Pictures
December 22, 1934	The Secret Bride	
December 29, 1934	Sweet Adeline	

=== 1935 ===
Release date	Title	Notes
January 12, 1935	Maybe It's Love	distribution only; produced by First National Pictures
January 23, 1935	Bordertown	
January 26, 1935	The Right to Live	
January 26, 1935	The White Cockatoo	
February 2, 1935	Red Hot Tires	distribution only; produced by First National Pictures
February 9, 1935	Devil Dogs of the Air	co-production with Cosmopolitan Productions
February 16, 1935	The Woman In Red	distribution only; produced by First National Pictures
February 22, 1935	The Singer of Naples	
February 23, 1935	Sweet Music	
March 2, 1935	Living on Velvet	distribution only; produced by First National Pictures
March 9, 1935	While the Patient Slept	distribution only; produced by First National Pictures
March 15, 1935	Gold Diggers of 1935	distribution only; produced by First National Pictures
March 23, 1935	A Night at the Ritz	
March 28, 1935	Traveling Saleslady	distribution only; produced by First National Pictures
March 30, 1935	The Florentine Dagger	
April 13, 1935	The Case of the Curious Bride	distribution only; produced by First National Pictures
April 20, 1935	Go into Your Dance	distribution only; produced by First National Pictures
April 27, 1935	Mary Jane's Pa	distribution only; produced by First National Pictures
May 4, 1935	G Men	distribution only; produced by First National Pictures
May 11, 1935	Dinky	
May 18, 1935	Black Fury	distribution only; produced by First National Pictures
May 25, 1935	In Caliente	distribution only; produced by First National Pictures
June 1, 1935	The Girl from 10th Avenue	
June 8, 1935	Oil for the Lamps of China	distribution only; co-production with Cosmopolitan Productions and First National Pictures
June 15, 1935	Alibi Ike	
June 29, 1935	Stranded	
July 13, 1935	Don't Bet on Blondes	
July 20, 1935	Front Page Woman	
July 27, 1935	Bright Lights	
July 27, 1935	Broadway Gondolier	
August 3, 1935	The Irish in Us	distribution only; produced by First National Pictures
August 17, 1935	We're in the Money	
August 23, 1935	Going Highbrow	
September 7, 1935	Little Big Shot	
September 7, 1935	Page Miss Glory	co-production with Cosmopolitan Productions
September 14, 1935	Special Agent	distribution only; co-production with Cosmopolitan Productions
September 21, 1935	The Goose and the Gander	
September 28, 1935	I Live for Love	
September 30, 1935	A Midsummer Night's Dream	
October 5, 1935	The Case of the Lucky Legs	
October 12, 1935	Shipmates Forever	distribution only; produced by First National Pictures
October 19, 1935	Dr. Socrates	
October 26, 1935	Personal Maid's Secret	
November 2, 1935	Moonlight on the Prairie	
November 9, 1935	The Payoff	
November 16, 1935	I Found Stella Parish	
November 23, 1935	Stars over Broadway	
November 30, 1935	Frisco Kid	
December 7, 1935	Broadway Hostess	distribution only; produced by First National Pictures
December 14, 1935	Miss Pacific Fleet	
December 21, 1935	Man of Iron	
December 25, 1935	Dangerous	
December 28, 1935	Captain Blood	co-production with Cosmopolitan Productions

=== 1936 ===
Release date	Title	Notes
January 11, 1936	The Murder of Dr. Harrigan	distribution only; produced by First National Pictures
January 16, 1936	Ceiling Zero	co-production with Cosmopolitan Productions
January 18, 1936	Freshman Love	
February 1, 1936	The Widow from Monte Carlo	
February 8, 1936	The Petrified Forest	
February 12, 1936	Mr. Cohen Takes a Walk	
February 15, 1936	Man Hunt	
February 22, 1936	The Story of Louis Pasteur	co-production with Cosmopolitan Productions
February 28, 1936	Song of the Saddle	distribution only; produced by First National Pictures
March 7, 1936	Boulder Dam	
March 14, 1936	The Walking Dead	
March 21, 1936	Colleen	
March 28, 1936	Road Gang	distribution only; produced by First National Pictures
April 4, 1936	Snowed Under	distribution only; produced by First National Pictures
April 11, 1936	The Singing Kid	distribution only; produced by First National Pictures
April 18, 1936	Brides Are Like That	distribution only; produced by First National Pictures
April 25, 1936	I Married a Doctor	distribution only; produced by First National Pictures
May 2, 1936	Treachery Rides the Range	
May 9, 1936	Times Square Playboy	
May 16, 1936	The Law in Her Hands	distribution only; produced by First National Pictures
May 23, 1936	The Golden Arrow	distribution only; produced by First National Pictures
May 30, 1936	Sons o' Guns	
June 6, 1936	Bullets or Ballots	distribution only; produced by First National Pictures
June 13, 1936	Murder by an Aristocrat	distribution only; produced by First National Pictures
June 20, 1936	Hearts Divided	distribution only; co-production with Cosmopolitan Productions and First National Pictures
June 22, 1936	The Big Noise	
July 4, 1936	The White Angel	distribution only; produced by First National Pictures
July 11, 1936	Two Against the World	distribution only; produced by First National Pictures
July 18, 1936	Hot Money	
July 22, 1936	Satan Met a Lady	
July 24, 1936	Earthworm Tractors	distribution only; produced by First National Pictures
July 25, 1936	Public Enemy's Wife	
July 29, 1936	Bengal Tiger	
August 1, 1936	The Green Pastures	
August 5, 1936	Jailbreak	
August 15, 1936	The Case of the Velvet Claws	distribution only; produced by First National Pictures
August 22, 1936	China Clipper	distribution only; produced by First National Pictures
August 22, 1936	Love Begins at 20	
August 29, 1936	Anthony Adverse	
September 5, 1936	Trailin' West	distribution only; produced by First National Pictures
September 12, 1936	Stage Struck	
September 17, 1936	Give Me Your Heart	
September 18, 1936	Down the Stretch	distribution only; produced by First National Pictures
September 26, 1936	Cain and Mabel	co-production with Cosmopolitan Productions
October 10, 1936	Isle of Fury	
October 20, 1936	The Charge of the Light Brigade	
October 24, 1936	Here Comes Carter	distribution only; produced by First National Pictures
October 31, 1936	The Case of the Black Cat	distribution only; produced by First National Pictures
November 14, 1936	California Mail	
November 14, 1936	The Captain's Kid	distribution only; produced by First National Pictures
November 21, 1936	Three Men on a Horse	
November 28, 1936	Fugitive in the Sky	
December 8, 1936	Polo Joe	
December 19, 1936	King of Hockey	
December 24, 1936	Smart Blonde	
December 25, 1936	Sing Me a Love Song	distribution only; co-production with Cosmopolitan Productions and First National Pictures
December 28, 1936	Gold Diggers of 1937	

=== 1937 ===
Release date	Title	Notes
January 2, 1937
January 2, 1937	Guns of the Pecos	
January 16, 1937	God's Country and the Woman	Warner Bros.' first feature in three-strip Technicolor
January 23, 1937	Once a Doctor	
January 30, 1937	Black Legion	
February 6, 1937	Stolen Holiday	
February 13, 1937	The Great O'Malley	
February 20, 1937	Green Light	co-production with Cosmopolitan Productions
February 26, 1937	Her Husband's Secretary	
February 28, 1937	Penrod and Sam	
March 6, 1937	Midnight Court	
March 6, 1937	Ready, Willing and Able	
March 13, 1937	Land Beyond the Law	
March 27, 1937	The King and the Chorus Girl	
April 4, 1937	Men in Exile	
April 10, 1937	Marked Woman	
April 17, 1937	Call It a Day	co-production with Cosmopolitan Productions
April 17, 1937	That Man's Here Again	
April 24, 1937	Mountain Justice	
May 1, 1937	Melody for Two	
May 8, 1937	The Prince and the Pauper	
May 15, 1937	The Cherokee Strip	
May 15, 1937	Draegerman Courage	
May 22, 1937	The Go Getter	co-production with Cosmopolitan Productions
May 29, 1937	Kid Galahad	
June 8, 1937	The Case of the Stuttering Bishop	
June 12, 1937	Blazing Sixes	
June 19, 1937	Fly-Away Baby	
June 24, 1937	Slim	
June 26, 1937	Another Dawn	
July 3, 1937	The Singing Marine	
July 10, 1937	Empty Holsters	
July 10, 1937	Public Wedding	
July 13, 1937	Marry the Girl	
July 15, 1937	Ever Since Eve	co-production with Cosmopolitan Productions
July 24, 1937	Talent Scout	
August 5, 1937	White Bondage	
August 7, 1937	San Quentin	
August 14, 1937	Dance Charlie Dance	
August 14, 1937	The Devil's Saddle Legion	
August 21, 1937	The Footloose Heiress	
August 21, 1937	Mr. Dodd Takes the Air	
August 28, 1937	Confession	
September 4, 1937	Varsity Show	
September 11, 1937	Prairie Thunder	
September 11, 1937	Wine, Women and Horses	
September 18, 1937	That Certain Woman	
September 25, 1937	Back in Circulation	
October 2, 1937	The Life of Emile Zola	Inducted into the National Film Registry in 2000
October 2, 1937	Love Is on the Air	
October 9, 1937	They Won't Forget	
October 16, 1937	Over the Goal	
October 23, 1937	The Perfect Specimen	
October 30, 1937	The Great Garrick	
October 30, 1937	West of Shanghai	
November 6, 1937	Alcatraz Island	co-production with Cosmopolitan Productions
November 13, 1937	The Adventurous Blonde	
November 20, 1937	It's Love I'm After	
November 27, 1937	Expensive Husbands	
November 27, 1937	Submarine D-1	co-production with Cosmopolitan Productions
December 4, 1937	First Lady	
December 11, 1937	Missing Witnesses	
December 11, 1937	Sh! The Octopus	
December 18, 1937	She Loved a Fireman	
December 20, 1937	Hollywood Hotel	
December 25, 1937	Tovarich	

=== 1938 ===
Release date	Title	Notes
January 1, 1938	Sergeant Murphy	
January 8, 1938	The Patient in Room 18	
January 8, 1938	Swing Your Lady	
January 22, 1938	The Invisible Menace	
February 5, 1938	Blondes at Work	
February 12, 1938	Daredevil Drivers	
February 12, 1938	Gold Is Where You Find It	
February 26, 1938	Penrod and His Twin Brother	
March 5, 1938	A Slight Case of Murder	
March 12, 1938	Love, Honor and Behave	
March 19, 1938	He Couldn't Say No	
March 26, 1938	Jezebel	Inducted into the National Film Registry in 2009
April 2, 1938	Over the Wall	co-production with Cosmopolitan Productions
April 9, 1938	Accidents Will Happen	
April 16, 1938	Fools for Scandal	
April 23, 1938	Women Are Like That	
April 30, 1938	The Beloved Brat	
May 7, 1938	Torchy Blane in Panama	
May 14, 1938	The Adventures of Robin Hood	Inducted into the National Film Registry in 1995
May 21, 1938	Mystery House	
May 28, 1938	Crime School	
June 4, 1938	Little Miss Thoroughbred	
June 11, 1938	Gold Diggers in Paris	
June 18, 1938	When Were You Born	
June 23, 1938	White Banners	
July 9, 1938	Cowboy from Brooklyn	co-production with Cosmopolitan Productions
July 9, 1938	My Bill	
July 16, 1938	Men Are Such Fools	
July 16, 1938	Racket Busters	co-production with Cosmopolitan Productions
July 23, 1938	Penrod's Double Trouble	
July 30, 1938	The Amazing Dr. Clitterhouse	
August 8, 1938	Mr. Chump	
August 9, 1938	Four Daughters	
August 27, 1938	Boy Meets Girl	
September 3, 1938	Four's a Crowd	
September 10, 1938	Secrets of an Actress	
September 17, 1938	Valley of the Giants	
October 1, 1938	Garden of the Moon	
October 8, 1938	Broadway Musketeers	
October 14, 1938	The Sisters	
October 22, 1938	Girls on Probation	
October 29, 1938	Brother Rat	
November 5, 1938	Hard to Get	
November 12, 1938	Torchy Gets Her Man	
November 19, 1938	Nancy Drew... Detective	
November 26, 1938	Angels with Dirty Faces	Inducted into the National Film Registry in 2024
December 3, 1938	Comet over Broadway	
December 10, 1938	Heart of the North	
December 24, 1938	The Dawn Patrol	remake of the Warner Bros. 1930 film
December 31, 1938	Going Places	

=== 1939 ===
Release date	Title	Notes
January 7, 1939	Devil's Island	
January 14, 1939	King of the Underworld	
January 21, 1939	Off the Record	
January 28, 1939	They Made Me a Criminal	in Public domain
February 4, 1939	Torchy Blane in Chinatown	
February 11, 1939	Wings of the Navy	
February 18, 1939	Nancy Drew... Reporter	
February 25, 1939	Yes, My Darling Daughter	
March 4, 1939	Secret Service of the Air	
March 11, 1939	The Oklahoma Kid	
March 18, 1939	The Adventures of Jane Arden	
March 25, 1939	Blackwell's Island	
April 1, 1939	On Trial	
April 8, 1939	Dodge City	
April 15, 1939	Women in the Wind	
April 22, 1939	Dark Victory	
April 24, 1939	Juarez	
May 6, 1939	Confessions of a Nazi Spy	
May 13, 1939	Torchy Runs for Mayor	
May 20, 1939	Sweepstakes Winner	
May 20, 1939	You Can't Get Away with Murder	
May 23, 1939	The Kid from Kokomo	
May 27, 1939	Code of the Secret Service	
June 3, 1939	The Man Who Dared	
June 17, 1939	Nancy Drew... Trouble Shooter	
July 1, 1939	Naughty but Nice	
July 8, 1939	Hell's Kitchen	
July 15, 1939	Waterfront	
July 22, 1939	Daughters Courageous	
July 22, 1939	Each Dawn I Die	
July 29, 1939	The Cowboy Quarterback	
August 5, 1939	Indianapolis Speedway	
August 12, 1939	Torchy Blane... Playing with Dynamite	
August 26, 1939	The Angels Wash Their Faces	
August 26, 1939	Everybody's Hobby	
September 2, 1939	The Old Maid	
September 9, 1939	Nancy Drew and the Hidden Staircase	
September 16, 1939	Dust Be My Destiny	
September 23, 1939	No Place to Go	
September 30, 1939	Espionage Agent	
October 7, 1939	Pride of the Blue Grass	
October 14, 1939	On Your Toes	
October 21, 1939	Smashing the Money Ring	
October 25, 1939	The Roaring Twenties	
November 4, 1939	Kid Nightingale	
November 11, 1939	The Private Lives of Elizabeth and Essex	
November 18, 1939	On Dress Parade	
November 25, 1939	We Are Not Alone	
December 2, 1939	The Return of Doctor X	
December 9, 1939	Private Detective	
December 16, 1939	The Mad Empress	
December 23, 1939	Sons of the Sea	
December 25, 1939	Four Wives	
December 30, 1939	Invisible Stripes	

== See also ==
- List of New Line Cinema films
- List of films based on DC Comics publications
- List of Warner Bros. theatrical animated feature films
- List of Warner Bros. films (2020–2029)
- List of Warner Bros. films (2010–2019)
- List of Warner Bros. films (2000–2009)
- List of Warner Bros. films (1990–1999)
- List of Warner Bros. films (1980–1989)
- List of Warner Bros. films (1970–1979)
- List of Warner Bros. films (1960–1969)
- List of Warner Bros. films (1950–1959)
- List of Warner Bros. films (1940–1949)
- List of Warner Bros. films (1918–1929)
- Category:Lists of films by studio

== Bibliography ==
- Dick, Bernard F. (March 30, 2022). The Golden Age Musicals of Darryl F. Zanuck: The Gentleman Preferred Blondes. University Press of Mississippi. ISBN 978-1-4968-3862-9.
