= List of Warner Bros. films (2010–2019) =

The following is a list of films produced and/or distributed by Warner Bros. Pictures in the 2010s. This list does not include direct-to-video releases.

== 2010 ==
Release date	Title	Notes
January 15, 2010	The Book of Eli	North American distribution and Turkish theatrical distribution only; produced by Alcon Entertainment and Silver Pictures
January 29, 2010	Edge of Darkness (Note: Co-owned by Revolution Studios)	North and Hispanic American and Spanish distribution only; produced by GK Films, BBC Films and Icon Productions
February 12, 2010	Valentine's Day	distribution only; produced by New Line Cinema, Wayne Rice Films and Karz Entertainment
February 26, 2010	Cop Out	co-production with Marc Platt Productions
March 19, 2010	Hubble	co-production with IMAX Filmed Entertainment and NASA
April 2, 2010	Clash of the Titans	co-production with Legendary Pictures, Thunder Road Films and The Zanuck Company
April 23, 2010	The Losers	distribution outside the U.K., Ireland and France only; produced by Dark Castle Entertainment, Vertigo DC Comics, Weed Road Pictures and StudioCanal
April 30, 2010	A Nightmare on Elm Street	distribution only; produced by New Line Cinema and Platinum Dunes
May 27, 2010	Sex and the City 2 (Note: Co-owned by Alcon Entertainment)	distribution outside Australia, New Zealand, Greece, Cyprus and Singapore theatrically only; produced by New Line Cinema, HBO Films and Village Roadshow Pictures
June 4, 2010	Splice	U.S. co-distribution with Dark Castle Entertainment only; produced by Copperheart Entertainment, Gaumont and Telefilm Canada
June 18, 2010	Jonah Hex	co-production with Legendary Pictures, DC Entertainment, Mad Chance and Weed Road Pictures
July 16, 2010	Inception	inducted into the National Film Registry in 2025 co-production with Legendary Pictures and Syncopy Inc.
July 30, 2010	Cats & Dogs: The Revenge of Kitty Galore	distribution outside Australia, New Zealand, Greece, Cyprus and Singapore theatrically only; co-production with Village Roadshow Pictures, Mad Chance and Polymorphic Pictures
August 6, 2010	Flipped	distribution only; produced by Castle Rock Entertainment
August 20, 2010	Lottery Ticket	distribution only; produced by Alcon Entertainment, Burg/Koules Productions, Cube Vision and Sweepstake Productions
September 3, 2010	Going the Distance	distribution only; produced by New Line Cinema and Offspring Entertainment
September 17, 2010	The Town	co-production with Legendary Pictures, GK Films and Thunder Road Pictures
September 24, 2010	Legend of the Guardians: The Owls of Ga'Hoole	distribution outside Australia, New Zealand, Greece, Cyprus and Singapore theatrically only; co-production with Village Roadshow Pictures and Animal Logic
October 8, 2010	Life as We Know It	distribution outside Australia, New Zealand, Greece, Cyprus and Singapore theatrically only; co-production with Village Roadshow Pictures, Gold Circle Films and Josephson Entertainment
October 15, 2010	Pure Country 2: The Gift	distribution only; produced by Angry Monkey Entertainment and Roserock Films
October 22, 2010	Hereafter	co-production with The Kennedy/Marshall Company, Malpaso Productions and Amblin Entertainment
November 5, 2010	Due Date	co-production with Legendary Pictures and Green Hat Films
November 19, 2010	Harry Potter and the Deathly Hallows – Part 1	co-production with Heyday Films
December 17, 2010	Yogi Bear	co-production with Sunswept Entertainment, De Line Pictures and Rhythm and Hues Studios

== 2011 ==
Release date	Title	Notes
January 28, 2011	The Rite	distribution only; produced by New Line Cinema and Contrafilm
February 18, 2011	Unknown	distribution outside the U.K., Ireland, France, Belgium, Germany, Austria and Switzerland only; produced by Dark Castle Entertainment, Studio Babelsberg, Deutscher Filmforderfonds and Panda
February 25, 2011	Hall Pass	distribution only; produced by New Line Cinema and Conundrum Entertainment
March 11, 2011	Red Riding Hood	co-production with Appian Way Productions
March 25, 2011	Sucker Punch	co-production with Legendary Pictures and Cruel and Unusual Films
April 8, 2011	Arthur	co-production with MBST Entertainment, BenderSpink and Langley Park Productions
April 8, 2011	Born to Be Wild	co-distribution with IMAX Pictures only
May 6, 2011	Something Borrowed	North American, French and Italian distribution only; produced by Alcon Entertainment, 2S Films and Wild Ocean Films
May 26, 2011	The Hangover Part II	co-production with Legendary Pictures and Green Hat Films
June 17, 2011	Green Lantern	co-production with DC Entertainment and De Line Pictures
July 8, 2011	Horrible Bosses	distribution only; produced by New Line Cinema and Rat Entertainment
July 15, 2011	Harry Potter and the Deathly Hallows – Part 2	co-production with Heyday Films
July 29, 2011	Crazy, Stupid, Love	co-production with Carousel Productions and Di Novi Pictures
August 12, 2011	Final Destination 5	distribution only; produced by New Line Cinema, Practical Pictures and Zide Pictures
September 9, 2011	Contagion	co-production with Participant Media, Imagenation Abu Dhabi and Double Features Films
September 23, 2011	Dolphin Tale	distribution only; produced by Alcon Entertainment
September 30, 2011	Dream House	distribution in Latin America, the U.K., Ireland, Australia, New Zealand, France and Spain only; produced by Morgan Creek Productions
November 4, 2011	A Very Harold & Kumar 3D Christmas	distribution only; produced by New Line Cinema, Mandate Pictures and Kingsgate Films
November 11, 2011	J. Edgar	co-production with Imagine Entertainment, Malpaso Productions and Wintergreen Productions
November 18, 2011	Happy Feet Two	distribution outside Australia, New Zealand, Greece, Cyprus and Singapore theatrically only; co-production with Village Roadshow Pictures, Kennedy Miller Mitchell and Dr. D Studios
December 9, 2011	New Year's Eve	distribution only; produced by New Line Cinema, Wayne Rice Films and Karz Entertainment
December 16, 2011	Sherlock Holmes: A Game of Shadows	distribution outside Australia, New Zealand, Greece, Cyprus and Singapore theatrically only; co-production with Village Roadshow Pictures, Silver Pictures and Wigram Productions
December 25, 2011	Extremely Loud & Incredibly Close	co-production with Scott Rudin Productions

== 2012 ==
Release date	Title	Notes
January 13, 2012	Joyful Noise	distribution only; produced by Alcon Entertainment, Paura Productions and O.N.C. Entertainment
February 10, 2012	Journey 2: The Mysterious Island	distribution only; produced by New Line Cinema, Walden Media and Contrafilm
March 2, 2012	Project X	co-production with Silver Pictures and Green Hat Films
March 30, 2012	Wrath of the Titans	co-production with Legendary Pictures, Thunder Road Films, COTT Productions and Furia de Titanes II, A.I.E.
April 20, 2012	The Lucky One	distribution outside Australia, New Zealand, Greece, Cyprus and Singapore theatrically only; co-production with Village Roadshow Pictures and Di Novi Pictures
April 20, 2012	To the Arctic	co-production with IMAX
May 11, 2012	Dark Shadows	distribution outside Australia, New Zealand, Greece, Cyprus and Singapore theatrically only; co-production with Village Roadshow Pictures, Infinitum Nihil, GK Films and The Zanuck Company
May 25, 2012	Chernobyl Diaries	North American, German, Austrian, Spanish and Japanese co-distribution with Alcon Entertainment only; produced by FilmNation Entertainment and Oren Peli/Brian Witten Pictures
June 15, 2012	Rock of Ages	distribution only; produced by New Line Cinema, Corner Stone Entertainment, Material Pictures, Offspring Entertainment and Maguire Entertainment
June 29, 2012	Magic Mike	North American distribution only; produced by Nick Wechsler Productions, Iron Horse Entertainment and Extension 765
July 20, 2012	The Dark Knight Rises	co-production with Legendary Pictures, DC Entertainment and Syncopy Inc.
August 10, 2012	The Campaign	co-production with Gary Sanchez Productions and Everyman Pictures
August 24, 2012	The Apparition	distribution outside the U.K., Ireland, Germany and Austria only; produced by Dark Castle Entertainment and Studio Babelsberg
September 21, 2012	Trouble with the Curve	co-production with Malpaso Productions
October 12, 2012	Argo	co-production with GK Films and Smokehouse Pictures
October 26, 2012	Cloud Atlas	distribution in North America, the U.K., Ireland, France, Austria, Spain, Australia, New Zealand and Japan and German co-distribution with X Verleih AG only; produced by X-Filme Creative Pool, Cloud Atlas Productions and Anarchos Productions
December 14, 2012	The Hobbit: An Unexpected Journey	distribution in all media excluding international digital and television outside Scandinavia, Portugal, Poland, Hungary, Romania, Bulgaria, the Middle East and Israel only; produced by New Line Cinema, Metro-Goldwyn-Mayer and WingNut Films

== 2013 ==
Release date	Title	Notes
January 11, 2013	Gangster Squad	distribution outside Australia, New Zealand, Greece, Cyprus and Singapore theatrically only; co-production with Village Roadshow Pictures, Lin Pictures and Kevin McCormick Productions
February 1, 2013	Bullet to the Head	U.S. distribution only; produced by Dark Castle Entertainment, IM Global, Millar Gough Ink, Emjag and After Dark Films
February 14, 2013	Beautiful Creatures	North American distribution only; produced by Alcon Entertainment, 3 Arts Entertainment and Belle Pictures
March 1, 2013	Jack the Giant Slayer	distribution only; produced by New Line Cinema, Legendary Pictures, Original Film, Big Kid Pictures and Bad Hat Harry
March 15, 2013	The Incredible Burt Wonderstone	distribution only; produced by New Line Cinema, BenderSpink and Carousel Productions
April 12, 2013	42	co-production with Legendary Pictures
May 10, 2013	The Great Gatsby	distribution outside Australia, New Zealand, Greece, Cyprus and Singapore theatrically only; co-production with Village Roadshow Pictures, A&E Television, Bazmark Productions and Red Wagon Entertainment
May 23, 2013	The Hangover Part III	co-production with Legendary Pictures and Green Hat Films
June 14, 2013	Man of Steel	co-production with Legendary Pictures, DC Entertainment, Syncopy Inc., Cruel and Unusual Films and Peters Entertainment
July 12, 2013	Pacific Rim	distribution outside China only; co-production with Legendary Pictures and DDY
July 19, 2013	The Conjuring	distribution only; produced by New Line Cinema, The Safran Company and Evergreen Media Group
August 7, 2013	We're the Millers	distribution only; produced by New Line Cinema, Newman/Tooley Films, Slap Happy Productions, Heyday Films and BenderSpink
August 30, 2013	Getaway	distribution outside France, Germany, Austria and Japan only; produced by Dark Castle Entertainment, After Dark Films and Signature Entertainment
September 20, 2013	Prisoners	North American, Australian, New Zealand, Italian and Spanish distribution only; produced by Alcon Entertainment, 8:38 Productions and Madhouse Entertainment
October 4, 2013	Gravity	co-production with RatPac-Dune Entertainment, Heyday Films and Esperanto Filmoj Productions
December 13, 2013	The Hobbit: The Desolation of Smaug	distribution in all media excluding international digital and television outside Scandinavia, Portugal, Poland, Hungary, Romania, Bulgaria, the Middle East and Israel only; produced by New Line Cinema, Metro-Goldwyn-Mayer and WingNut Films
December 18, 2013	Her	North American, German and Austrian distribution only; produced by Annapurna Pictures
December 25, 2013	Grudge Match	co-production with RatPac-Dune Entertainment, Gerber Pictures and Callahan Filmworks

== 2014 ==
Release date	Title	Notes
February 7, 2014	The Lego Movie	distribution outside Australia, New Zealand, Greece, Cyprus and Singapore theatrically only; co-production with Warner Animation Group, Village Roadshow Pictures, RatPac-Dune Entertainment, Lego System A/S, Vertigo Entertainment and Lin Pictures
February 14, 2014	Winter's Tale	distribution outside Australia, New Zealand, Greece, Cyprus and Singapore theatrically only; co-production with Village Roadshow Pictures, RatPac-Dune Entertainment, Weed Road Pictures and Marc Platt Productions
March 7, 2014	300: Rise of an Empire	co-production with Legendary Pictures, Cruel and Unusual Films, Atmosphere Pictures and Hollywood Gang Films
March 14, 2014	Veronica Mars	distribution only; produced by Warner Bros. Digital and Spoondolie Productions
April 4, 2014	Island of Lemurs: Madagascar	co-distribution with IMAX Pictures only
April 18, 2014	Transcendence	North American distribution only; produced by Alcon Entertainment, DMG Entertainment and Straight Up Films
May 16, 2014	Godzilla	distribution outside Japan only; co-production with Legendary Pictures, RatPac-Dune Entertainment, Disruption Entertainment and Toho
May 23, 2014	Blended	co-production with RatPac-Dune Entertainment, Gulfstream Pictures and Happy Madison Productions
June 6, 2014	Edge of Tomorrow	distribution outside Australia, New Zealand, Greece, Cyprus and Singapore theatrically only; co-production with Village Roadshow Pictures, RatPac-Dune Entertainment, 3 Arts Entertainment and Viz Productions
June 20, 2014	Jersey Boys	co-production with RatPac-Dune Entertainment, GK Films and Malpaso Productions
July 2, 2014	Tammy	distribution only; produced by New Line Cinema, RatPac-Dune Entertainment, Gary Sanchez Productions and On the Day Productions
August 8, 2014	Into the Storm	distribution outside Australia, New Zealand, Greece, Cyprus and Singapore theatrically only; produced by New Line Cinema, Village Roadshow Pictures, RatPac-Dune Entertainment and Broken Road Productions
August 22, 2014	If I Stay (Note: Owned by MGM)	theatrical distribution outside Scandinavia, Portugal, Poland, Hungary, Romania, Bulgaria, the Czech Republic, Slovakia, the Middle East and Israel only; produced by Metro-Goldwyn-Mayer, New Line Cinema and Di Novi Pictures
August 27, 2014	Messi	distribution only; produced by Mediapro
September 12, 2014	Dolphin Tale 2	distribution only; produced by Alcon Entertainment
September 19, 2014	This Is Where I Leave You	co-production with RatPac-Dune Entertainment, Spring Creek Pictures and 21 Laps Entertainment
October 3, 2014	Annabelle	distribution only; produced by New Line Cinema, RatPac-Dune Entertainment, Atomic Monster and The Safran Company
October 3, 2014	The Good Lie	North American distribution only; produced by Alcon Entertainment, Imagine Entertainment, Black Label Media and Reliance Entertainment
October 10, 2014	The Judge	distribution outside Australia, New Zealand, Greece, Cyprus and Singapore theatrically only; co-production with Village Roadshow Pictures, RatPac-Dune Entertainment, Big Kid Pictures and Team Downey
November 5, 2014	Interstellar (Note: Skydance now owns worldwide rights to this film, having acquired Paramount Global in 2025 and Warner Bros. Discovery in 2026.)	international distribution only; co-production with Paramount Pictures, Legendary Pictures, Syncopy Inc. and Lynda Obst Productions
November 26, 2014	Horrible Bosses 2	distribution only; produced by New Line Cinema, BenderSpink and RatPac Entertainment
December 12, 2014	Inherent Vice	co-production with RatPac-Dune Entertainment, IAC Films, Ghoulardi Film Company and Scott Rudin Productions
December 17, 2014	The Hobbit: The Battle of the Five Armies	distribution in all media excluding international digital and television outside Scandinavia, Portugal, Poland, Hungary, Romania, Bulgaria, the Middle East and Israel only; produced by New Line Cinema, Metro-Goldwyn-Mayer and WingNut Films
December 25, 2014	American Sniper	distribution outside Australia, New Zealand and Singapore theatrically only; co-production with Village Roadshow Pictures, RatPac-Dune Entertainment, Mad Chance Productions, 22nd & Indiana Productions and Malpaso Productions

== 2015 ==
Release date	Title	Notes
February 6, 2015	Jupiter Ascending	distribution outside Australia, New Zealand and Singapore theatrically only; co-production with Village Roadshow Pictures, RatPac-Dune Entertainment and Anarchos Productions
February 27, 2015	Focus	co-production with RatPac-Dune Entertainment, Di Novi Pictures and Zaftig Films
March 13, 2015	Run All Night	co-production with RatPac-Dune Entertainment, Vertigo Entertainment and Energy Entertainment
March 27, 2015	Get Hard	co-production with RatPac-Dune Entertainment and Gary Sanchez Productions
April 10, 2015	Lost River	U.S. distribution only; produced by Marc Platt Productions, Phantasma Films and Bold Films
April 24, 2015	The Water Diviner	U.S. distribution only; produced by RatPac Entertainment, Seven Network Australia, Megiste Films, DC Tour, EJM Productions, Axphon, Hopscotch Features and Fear of God Films
May 8, 2015	Hot Pursuit	co-distribution in all media excluding digital and television outside Scandinavia, Portugal, Poland, Hungary, Romania, Bulgaria, the Czech Republic, Slovakia, the Middle East and Israel with New Line Cinema only; produced by Metro-Goldwyn-Mayer and Pacific Standard
May 15, 2015	Mad Max: Fury Road	distribution outside Australia, New Zealand and Singapore theatrically only; co-production with Village Roadshow Pictures, RatPac-Dune Entertainment and Kennedy Miller Mitchell
May 29, 2015	San Andreas	distribution outside Australia, New Zealand and Singapore theatrically only; produced by New Line Cinema, Village Roadshow Pictures, RatPac-Dune Entertainment and Flynn Picture Company
June 3, 2015	Entourage	distribution only; produced by HBO Films, RatPac-Dune Entertainment, Closest to the Wall Productions and Leverage Entertainment
June 26, 2015	Batkid Begins	co-distribution with New Line Cinema only; produced by KTF Films
June 26, 2015	Max	distribution in all media excluding international digital and television outside Scandinavia and the Middle East only; produced by Metro-Goldwyn-Mayer and Sunswept Entertainment
July 1, 2015	Magic Mike XXL	co-production with RatPac-Dune Entertainment and Iron Horse Entertainment
July 10, 2015	The Gallows	co-distribution with New Line Cinema only; produced by Blumhouse Productions, Management 360, and Tremendum Pictures
July 29, 2015	Vacation	distribution only; produced by New Line Cinema, RatPac-Dune Entertainment, BenderSpink and Big Kid Pictures
August 14, 2015	The Man from U.N.C.L.E.	co-production with RatPac-Dune Entertainment, Ritchie/Wigram Films, Davis Entertainment and Turner Entertainment Co.
August 28, 2015	We Are Your Friends	U.S. distribution only; produced by StudioCanal and Working Title Films
September 15, 2015	Hidden	co-production with Vertigo Entertainment
September 18, 2015	Black Mass	co-production with Cross Creek Pictures, RatPac-Dune Entertainment, Le Grisbi Productions, Free State Pictures, Head Gear Films and Vendian Entertainment
September 25, 2015	The Intern	co-production with RatPac-Dune Entertainment and Waverly Films
October 9, 2015	Pan	co-production with RatPac-Dune Entertainment and Berlanti Productions
October 30, 2015	Our Brand Is Crisis	co-production with RatPac-Dune Entertainment, Participant Media and Smokehouse Pictures
November 13, 2015	The 33	co-distribution outside Latin America, Portugal, the Middle East, Indonesia, Singapore, the Philippines, China, Korea and Taiwan with Alcon Entertainment only; produced by Phoenix Pictures
November 25, 2015	Creed	co-distribution in all media excluding digital and television outside Scandinavia, Portugal, Poland, Hungary, Romania, Bulgaria, the Czech Republic, Slovakia, the Middle East and Israel with New Line Cinema only; produced by Metro-Goldwyn-Mayer, Chartoff Productions and Winkler Films
December 11, 2015	In the Heart of the Sea	distribution outside Australia, New Zealand and Singapore theatrically only; co-production with Village Roadshow Pictures, RatPac-Dune Entertainment, COTT Productions, Enelmar Productions, A.I.E., Roth Films, Spring Creek Pictures, Imagine Entertainment and Kia Jam Productions
December 25, 2015	Point Break	distribution in North and Latin America, the U.K., Ireland, the CIS and Japan only; produced by Alcon Entertainment, DMG Entertainment and Studio Babelsberg

== 2016 ==
Release date	Title	Notes
February 12, 2016	How to Be Single	co-production with Metro-Goldwyn-Mayer, New Line Cinema, RatPac-Dune Entertainment, Flower Films and Wrigley Pictures
March 18, 2016	Midnight Special	distribution outside the U.K., Ireland, Greece, Cyprus, China, the Middle East, Turkey and India only; co-production with RatPac-Dune Entertainment, FilmNation Entertainment, Faliro House Productions and Tri-State Pictures
March 25, 2016	Batman v Superman: Dawn of Justice	co-production with RatPac-Dune Entertainment, DC Entertainment, Atlas Entertainment and Cruel and Unusual Films
April 15, 2016	Barbershop: The Next Cut	co-distribution in all media excluding digital and television outside Scandinavia with New Line Cinema only; produced by Metro-Goldwyn-Mayer, State Street Pictures and Cube Vision
April 29, 2016	Keanu	distribution only; produced by New Line Cinema, RatPac-Dune Entertainment, Monkeypaw Productions, Detroit Pictures and Principato-Young Entertainment
May 20, 2016	The Nice Guys	North American distribution only; produced by Silver Pictures and Waypoint Entertainment
June 3, 2016	Me Before You	co-distribution in all media excluding international digital and television outside Scandinavia, Portugal, Poland, Hungary, Romania, Bulgaria, the Czech Republic, Slovakia, the Middle East and Israel with New Line Cinema only; produced by Metro-Goldwyn-Mayer and Sunswept Entertainment
June 10, 2016	The Conjuring 2	distribution only; produced by New Line Cinema, RatPac-Dune Entertainment, The Safran Company and Atomic Monster
June 17, 2016	Central Intelligence	North American distribution only; co-production with Universal Pictures, New Line Cinema, RatPac-Dune Entertainment, Bluegrass Films and Principato-Young Entertainment
July 1, 2016	The Legend of Tarzan	distribution outside Australia, New Zealand and Singapore theatrically only; co-production with Village Roadshow Pictures, RatPac-Dune Entertainment, Jerry Weintraub Productions, Riche/Ludwig Productions and Beaglepug Films
July 22, 2016	Lights Out	distribution only; produced by New Line Cinema, RatPac-Dune Entertainment, Grey Matter Productions and Atomic Monster
August 5, 2016	Suicide Squad	co-production with RatPac-Dune Entertainment, DC Films and Atlas Entertainment
August 19, 2016	War Dogs	co-production with RatPac-Dune Entertainment, Joint Effort Productions and The Mark Gordon Company
September 9, 2016	Sully	distribution outside Australia, New Zealand and Singapore theatrically only; co-production with Village Roadshow Pictures, RatPac-Dune Entertainment, Flashlight Films, The Kennedy/Marshall Company and Malpaso Productions
September 23, 2016	Storks	co-production with Warner Animation Group, RatPac-Dune Entertainment and Stoller Global Solutions
October 14, 2016	The Accountant	co-production with RatPac-Dune Entertainment, Electric City Entertainment and Zero Gravity Management
October 18, 2016	Within	distribution only; produced by New Line Cinema, Alvarez Company and The Safran Company
November 18, 2016	Fantastic Beasts and Where to Find Them	co-production with Heyday Films
December 16, 2016	Collateral Beauty	distribution outside Australia, New Zealand and Singapore theatrically only; produced by New Line Cinema, Village Roadshow Pictures, RatPac-Dune Entertainment, Anonymous Content, Overbrook Entertainment, PalmStar Media, Likely Story and Merced Media
December 25, 2016	Live by Night	co-production with RatPac-Dune Entertainment, Appian Way Productions and Pearl Street Films

== 2017 ==
Release date	Title	Notes
February 10, 2017	The Lego Batman Movie	co-production with Warner Animation Group, DC Entertainment, RatPac-Dune Entertainment, Lego System A/S, Lin Pictures and Vertigo Entertainment, Lord Miller Productions and Animal Logic
February 17, 2017	Fist Fight	distribution outside Australia, New Zealand and Singapore theatrically only; produced by New Line Cinema, Village Roadshow Pictures, RatPac-Dune Entertainment, 21 Laps Entertainment, and Wrigley Pictures
March 10, 2017	Kong: Skull Island	distribution outside China only; produced by Legendary Pictures, RatPac-Dune Entertainment, Tencent Pictures and Disruption Entertainment
March 24, 2017	CHiPs	co-production with RatPac-Dune Entertainment and Primate Pictures
April 7, 2017	Going in Style	distribution outside Australia, New Zealand and Singapore theatrically only; produced by New Line Cinema, Village Roadshow Pictures, RatPac-Dune Entertainment and De Line Pictures
April 18, 2017	Wolves at the Door	distribution only; produced by New Line Cinema and The Safran Company
April 21, 2017	Unforgettable	co-production with RatPac-Dune Entertainment and Di Novi Pictures
May 12, 2017	King Arthur: Legend of the Sword	distribution outside Australia, New Zealand and Singapore theatrically only; co-production with Village Roadshow Pictures, RatPac-Dune Entertainment, Weed Road Pictures, Safe House Pictures and Ritchie/Wigram Productions
May 19, 2017	Everything, Everything	distribution in all media excluding international digital and television outside Scandinavia, Portugal, Poland, Hungary, Romania, Bulgaria, the Czech Republic, Slovakia, the Middle East and Israel only; co-production with Metro-Goldwyn-Mayer and Alloy Entertainment
June 2, 2017	Wonder Woman	co-production with DC Films, RatPac-Dune Entertainment, Tencent Pictures, Wanda Pictures, Atlas Entertainment and Cruel and Unusual Films
June 30, 2017	The House	distribution outside Australia, New Zealand and Singapore theatrically only; produced by New Line Cinema, Village Roadshow Pictures, RatPac-Dune Entertainment, Gary Sanchez Productions and Good Universe
July 21, 2017	Dunkirk	co-production with RatPac-Dune Entertainment and Syncopy Inc.
August 11, 2017	Annabelle: Creation	distribution only; produced by New Line Cinema, RatPac-Dune Entertainment, Atomic Monster and The Safran Company
September 8, 2017	It	distribution only; produced by New Line Cinema, RatPac-Dune Entertainment, Vertigo Entertainment, Lin Pictures and KatzSmith Productions
September 22, 2017	The Lego Ninjago Movie	co-production with Warner Animation Group, RatPac-Dune Entertainment, Lego System A/S, Lin Pictures, Lord Miller Productions, Vertigo Entertainment and Animal Logic
October 6, 2017	Blade Runner 2049	North American distribution only; produced by Alcon Entertainment, Columbia Pictures, Scott Free Productions, Torridon Films and 16:14 Entertainment
October 20, 2017	Geostorm	co-production with RatPac-Dune Entertainment, Skydance and Electric Entertainment
November 17, 2017	Justice League	co-production with DC Films, RatPac-Dune Entertainment, Atlas Entertainment and Cruel and Unusual Films
December 1, 2017	The Disaster Artist	nominated for the Golden Globe Award for Best Motion Picture - Musical or Comedy international distribution only; produced by New Line Cinema, Good Universe, Point Grey Pictures, Ramona Films and Rabbit Bandini Productions; distributed in North America by A24
December 22, 2017	Father Figures	distribution outside Latin America and China only; produced by Alcon Entertainment, The Montecito Picture Company and DMG Entertainment

== 2018 ==
Release date	Title	Notes
January 12, 2018	Paddington 2	North American and Spanish distribution only; produced by StudioCanal, Anton Capital Entertainment, Heyday Films and Canal+
January 19, 2018	12 Strong	North American distribution only; produced by Alcon Entertainment, Black Label Media, Jerry Bruckheimer Films and Torridon Films
February 9, 2018	The 15:17 to Paris	distribution outside Australia and New Zealand only; co-production with Village Roadshow Pictures, RatPac-Dune Entertainment and Malpaso Productions
February 23, 2018	Game Night	distribution only; produced by New Line Cinema, RatPac-Dune Entertainment, Davis Entertainment, and Aggregate Films
March 16, 2018	Tomb Raider	distribution in all media excluding digital and television outside Scandinavia, Portugal, Poland, Hungary, Romania, Bulgaria, the Czech Republic, Slovakia, the Middle East and Israel only; produced by Metro-Goldwyn-Mayer, Square Enix and GK Films
March 29, 2018	Ready Player One	distribution outside Australia and New Zealand only; co-production with Amblin Entertainment, Village Roadshow Pictures, RatPac-Dune Entertainment, De Line Pictures and Farah Films & Management
April 6, 2018	Pandas	co-production with IMAX, Panda Productions, and Jin Yi Culture Investment Corporation
April 13, 2018	Rampage	distribution only; produced by New Line Cinema, ASAP Entertainment, Wrigley Pictures, Flynn Picture Company and Seven Bucks Productions
May 11, 2018	Life of the Party	distribution only; produced by New Line Cinema and On the Day Productions
June 8, 2018	Ocean's 8	distribution outside Australia and New Zealand only; co-production with Village Roadshow Pictures, Rahway Road Pictures, Smokehouse Pictures and Larger Than Life Productions
June 15, 2018	Tag	distribution only; produced by New Line Cinema and Broken Road Productions;
July 27, 2018	Teen Titans Go! To the Movies	co-production with Warner Bros. Animation and DC Entertainment; first Warner Bros. film released under WarnerMedia after AT&T's acquisition
August 10, 2018	The Meg	distribution outside China only; co-production with Gravity Pictures, Di Bonaventura Pictures, Apelles Entertainment, Maeday Productions and Flagship Entertainment Group
August 15, 2018	Crazy Rich Asians	co-production with SK Global, Starlight Culture, Color Force, Ivanhoe Pictures and Electric Somewhere
September 7, 2018	The Nun	distribution only; produced by New Line Cinema, Atomic Monster and the Safran Company
September 28, 2018	Smallfoot	co-production with Warner Animation Group and Zaftig Films
October 5, 2018	A Star Is Born	co-production with Live Nation Productions, Metro-Goldwyn-Mayer, Peters Entertainment, Gerber Pictures and Joint Effort
November 16, 2018	Fantastic Beasts: The Crimes of Grindelwald	co-production with Heyday Films and Wigram Productions
November 21, 2018	Creed II	distribution in all media excluding digital and television outside Scandinavia, Portugal, Poland, Hungary, Romania, Bulgaria, the Czech Republic, Slovakia, the Middle East, Israel and China only; produced by Metro-Goldwyn-Mayer, New Line Cinema, Chartoff Productions and Winkler Films
November 30, 2018	Head Full of Honey	co-production with Barefoot Films
December 7, 2018	Mowgli: Legend of the Jungle	co-production with The Imaginarium; distributed by Netflix
December 13, 2018	They Shall Not Grow Old	distribution only; produced by WingNut Films, House Productions, 14-18 Now, Imperial War Museum, BBC Films and New Zealand Film Commission; co-distributed theatrically by Fathom Events
December 14, 2018	The Mule	co-production with Imperative Entertainment, Bron Creative and Malpaso Productions
December 21, 2018	Aquaman	co-production with DC Films, The Safran Company and Cruel and Unusual Films

== 2019 ==
Release date	Title	Notes
February 8, 2019	The Lego Movie 2: The Second Part	co-production with Warner Animation Group, Lego System A/S, Rideback, Lord Miller Productions, Vertigo Entertainment and Animal Logic
February 13, 2019	Isn't It Romantic	North American distribution only; produced by New Line Cinema, Bron Creative, Broken Road Productions and Little Engine
March 15, 2019	Nancy Drew and the Hidden Staircase	co-production with A Very Good Production and Red 56
April 5, 2019	Shazam!	distribution only; produced by New Line Cinema, DC Films, The Safran Company and Seven Bucks Productions
April 19, 2019	The Curse of La Llorona	distribution only; produced by New Line Cinema, Atomic Monster and Emile Gladstone Productions
May 10, 2019	Detective Pikachu	distribution outside Japan and China only; produced by Legendary Pictures, The Pokémon Company and Toho
May 17, 2019	The Sun Is Also a Star	distribution in all media excluding international digital and television outside Scandinavia, Portugal, Poland, Hungary, Romania, Bulgaria, the Czech Republic, Slovakia, the Middle East and Israel only; produced by Metro-Goldwyn-Mayer and Alloy Entertainment
May 31, 2019	Godzilla: King of the Monsters	distribution outside Japan and China only; produced by Legendary Pictures
June 14, 2019	Shaft	North American distribution only; produced by New Line Cinema and Davis Entertainment
June 26, 2019	Annabelle Comes Home	distribution only; produced by New Line Cinema, Atomic Monster and The Safran Company
August 9, 2019	The Kitchen	distribution only; produced by New Line Cinema, Bron Creative, DC Vertigo and Michael De Luca Productions
August 16, 2019	Blinded by the Light	co-distribution outside the U.K., Ireland, Australia, New Zealand, France, Scandinavia, South Africa and Japan with New Line Cinema only; produced by Levantine Films, Ingenious Media, Cornerstone Films and Bend It Films
September 6, 2019	It Chapter Two	distribution only; produced by New Line Cinema, Double Dream, Vertigo Entertainment and Rideback
September 13, 2019	The Goldfinch	co-production with Amazon Studios and Color Force
October 4, 2019	Joker	distribution outside Australia and New Zealand only; co-production with Village Roadshow Pictures, DC Films, Bron Creative and Joint Effort
November 1, 2019	Motherless Brooklyn	distribution only; produced by Class 5 Films and MWM Studios
November 8, 2019	Doctor Sleep	co-production with Intrepid Pictures, Vertigo Entertainment and Weed Road
November 15, 2019	The Good Liar	distribution only; produced by New Line Cinema, Bron Creative and 1000 Eyes
December 13, 2019	Richard Jewell	co-production with Malpaso Productions, Appian Way Productions, Misher Films and 75 Year Plan Productions
December 25, 2019	Just Mercy	co-production with Endeavor Content, One Community, Participant Media, Macro Media, Gil Netter Productions and Outlier Society

== See also ==
- List of Warner Bros. International films (2010–2019)
- List of New Line Cinema films
- List of films based on DC Comics publications
- List of Warner Bros. theatrical animated feature films
- List of Warner Bros. films (2020–2029)
- List of Warner Bros. films (2000–2009)
- List of Warner Bros. films (1990-1999)
- List of Warner Bros. films (1980–1989)
- List of Warner Bros. films (1970–1979)
- List of Warner Bros. films (1960–1969)
- List of Warner Bros. films (1950–1959)
- List of Warner Bros. films (1940–1949)
- List of Warner Bros. films (1930–1939)
- List of Warner Bros. films (1918–1929)
- Category:Lists of films by studio
