= List of Warner Bros. International films (2010–2019) =

The following is a list of foreign films produced, co-produced, and/or distributed by Warner Bros. internationally in 2010–2019. This does not include direct-to-video releases or films released under joint ventures. For the German films Warner Bros. co-distributed with X Verleih AG, see X Filme Creative Pool.

== 2010 ==
Release Date	Title	Country	Notes
January 5, 2010	Me, Them and Lara	Italy	
February 5, 2010	Monga	Taiwan	theatrical distribution only; produced by Greenday Films
March 5, 2010	Atithi Tum Kab Jaoge?	India	theatrical distribution only; produced by Wide Frame Films
March 31, 2010	Turk's Head	France	distribution only; produced by Alicéléo
April 2, 2010	Sul mare	Italy	co-production with Buddy Gang
April 2, 2010	The Famous and The Dead	Brazil	distribution only; produced by Dueto Filmes and Ioiô Filmes
April 9, 2010	Jaane Kahan Se Aayi Hai	India	distribution only; produced by People Tree Films
April 16, 2010	The Best Things in the World	Brazil	co-distribution with Riofilme only; produced by Gullane Filmes
April 23, 2010	To Hell with the Ugly	Spain	distribution only; produced by Antena 3 Films and Producciones Aparte
April 24, 2010	Gintama: The Movie	Japan	distribution only; produced by Sunrise
April 30, 2010	Come Undone	Italy	distribution only; produced by Lumiere & Co., Vega Film and Radiotelevisione svizzera
May 15, 2010	Shodo Girls	Japan	theatrical distribution only; produced by NTV
June 12, 2010	Outrage	Japan	theatrical distribution only; produced by Bandai Visual, Office Kitano, Omnibus Promotion, TV Tokyo and Tokyo FM
August 27, 2010	No eres tú, soy yo	Mexico	distribution only; produced by Río Negro and Barracuda Films
September 18, 2010	Lahore	India	theatrical distribution only; produced by Sai Om Films Private Limited
October 1, 2010	Buried	Spain	distribution only; produced by The Safran Company, Dark Trick Films, Kinology and Studio 37
October 14, 2010	Young Goethe in Love	Germany	co-production with SevenPictures Film
October 15, 2010	Di Di Hollywood	Spain	distribution only; produced by El Virgili Films, La Canica Films and Malvarrosa Media
October 15, 2010	Ramayana: The Epic	India	distribution only; produced by Maya Digital Media
October 16, 2010	The Incite Mill	Japan	
October 22, 2010	Dus Tola	India	theatrical distribution only; produced by Aryan Brothers Entertainment
October 22, 2010	Unlikely Revolutionaries	Italy	co-production with ITC Movie and Pupkin Production
November 12, 2010	Ti presento un amico	Italy	co-production with Media One S.P.A.
December 2, 2010	Otto's Eleven	Germany	co-production with TransWaalFilm Produktion, Zipfelmützenfilm and Poppular Pictures
December 3, 2010	Phas Gaye Re Obama	India	distribution only; produced by Revel Films
December 3, 2010	Three Steps Above Heaven	Spain	distribution only; produced by Zeta Cinema, A3 Films, Cangrejo Films and Globomedia
December 16, 2010	Vater Morgana	Germany	co-production with Movie Company Film und Fernseh
December 17, 2010	The Last Circus	Spain	distribution only; produced by Tornasol Films, Castafiore Films and La Fabrique 2
December 17, 2010	Love & Slaps	Italy	co-production with Cinemaundici and Alien Produzioni

== 2011 ==
Release Date	Title	Country	Notes
February 3, 2011	Kokowääh	Germany	co-production with Barefoot Films and Béla Jarzyk Production
February 4, 2011	Cousinhood	Spain	distribution only; produced by Atípica Films and MOD Producciones
February 4, 2011	How to Get Rid of Cellulite	Poland	distribution only; produced by San Graal
February 4, 2011	Utt Pataang	India	theatrical distribution only; produced by Rash Productions
February 23, 2011	17 Hours	Spain	distribution only; produced by Wave Films and AIE Lazona Films
February 25, 2011	And Then What?	Turkey	theatrical distribution only; produced by Renkli Filmler, DNZ Film and Demtaş
March 4, 2011	Ironclad	United Kingdom	distribution only; produced by VIP Medienfonds 4
March 4, 2011	Lope: The Outlaw	Brazil	distribution only; produced by Antena 3 Films, Conspiração Filmes, Ikiru Films and El Toro Pictures
March 9, 2011	Torrente 4: Lethal Crisis	Spain	distribution only; produced by Amiguetes Entertainment and Antena 3 Films
March 11, 2011	Kolpaçino: Bomba	Turkey	distribution only; produced by Su Filmcilik
June 4, 2011	Paradise Kiss	Japan	
June 8, 2011	The Prodigies	France	distribution only; produced by Norman Studios
June 29, 2011	Nicostratos the Pelican	France	distribution only; produced by FIVE2ONE Films and Wesh Wesh Productions
July 23, 2011	Ninja Kids!!!	Japan	theatrical distribution only; produced by Sedic International
September 2, 2011	The Skin I Live In	Spain	Spanish theatrical and Italian distribution only; produced by El Deseo
September 12, 2011	Top Cat: The Movie	Mexico	distribution only; produced by Anima Estudios
September 15, 2011	Men in the City 2	Germany	distribution only; produced by Wiedemann & Berg Filmproduktion
September 23, 2011	No Rest for the Wicked	Spain	distribution only; produced by Telecinco Cinema, Lazona Films and Manto Films
September 30, 2011	Viento en Contra	Mexico	distribution only; produced by Celeste Films
September 30, 2011	Chargesheet	India	distribution only; produced by Navketan International
October 12, 2011	The Artist	France	distribution only; produced by La Petite Reine and Studio 37
October 13, 2011	Laura's Star and the Dream Monsters	Germany	distribution under Warner Bros. Family Entertainment only; co-production with Rothkirch Cartoon-Film, MABO Pictures Filmproduktion and Comet Film
October 21, 2011	The Sleeping Voice	Spain	distribution only; produced by Maestranza Films and Mirada Sur
October 28, 2011	The Worst Week of My Life	Italy	distribution only; produced by Colorado Film
November 23, 2011	Black Gold	France	distribution in France, the U.K., Ireland, Latin America and the Middle East only; produced by Quinta Communications, Prima TV, Carthago Films and France 2 Cinéma
November 25, 2011	Dam 999	India	theatrical distribution only; produced by BizTV Network
December 16, 2011	Maktub	Spain	distribution only; produced by Sonrisas que Hacen Magia Producciones AIE

== 2012 ==
Release Date	Title	Country	Notes
January 13, 2012	Black & White Episode I: The Dawn of Assault	Taiwan	distribution only; produced by Prajna Works Entertainment
February 4, 2012	Berserk: The Golden Age Arc I: The Egg of the King	Japan	theatrical distribution only; produced by Studio 4°C
February 10, 2012	Love	Taiwan; China	Taiwanese distribution only; produced by Honto Productions and Huayi Brothers
March 9, 2012	Ti stimo fratello	Italy	co-production with Colorado Film and Bananas
March 9, 2012	Cleanskin	United Kingdom	distribution only; produced by The UK Film Studio
March 19, 2012	The Impossible	Spain	distribution only; produced by Apaches Entertainment and Telecinco Cinema
March 23, 2012	È nata una star?	Italy	co-production with IBC Movie
April 4, 2012	Unit 7	Spain	distribution only; produced by Atípica Films, La Zanfoña Producciones and Sacromonte Films
June 22, 2012	I Want You	Spain	distribution only; produced by Zeta Cinema, Antena 3 Films, Charanga Films and Globomedia
June 23, 2012	Berserk: The Golden Age Arc II: The Battle for Doldrey	Japan	theatrical distribution only; produced by Studio 4°C
July 7, 2012	The Life of Budori Gusuko	Japan	theatrical distribution only; produced by Tezuka Productions
August 25, 2012	Rurouni Kenshin	Japan	distribution in Japan and the U.K. only; produced by C&I Entertainment, IMJ Entertainment, RoC Works Co. and Studio Swan
September 19, 2012	Now Is Good	United Kingdom; France	U.K. and Irish distribution only; produced by BBC Films, Blueprint Pictures and British Film Institute
September 21, 2012	Touch of the Light	Taiwan	theatrical distribution only
September 26, 2012	The Dream Team	France	distribution only; produced by Vito Films and TF1 Films
September 28, 2012	Guardians	Germany	co-production with Barefoot Films
October 6, 2012	Beyond Outrage	Japan	theatrical distribution only; produced by Bandai Visual, Office Kitano and TV Tokyo
October 11, 2012	Men Do What They Can	Germany	co-production with NFP Neue Film Produktion
October 18, 2012	Garibaldi's Lovers	Italy	distribution only; produced by Lumiere & Co and Ventura Film
October 24, 2012	Stars 80	France	distribution only; produced by La Petite Reine
October 25, 2012	Measuring the World	Germany	distribution only; produced by Boje Buck Filmproduktion and Lotus-Film
November 22, 2012	The Worst Christmas of My Life	Italy	distribution only; produced by Colorado Film
November 30, 2012	Os Penetras	Brazil	distribution only; produced by Conspiração Filmes, Globo Filmes and Teleimage
December 20, 2012	Jesus Loves Me	Germany	distribution only; produced by UFA Cinema and ZDF
December 26, 2012	Ludwig II	Germany	co-production with Bavaria Pictures and Dor Film

== 2013 ==
Release Date	Title	Country	Notes
January 1, 2013	The Best Offer	Italy	Italian, German and Austrian distribution only; co-production with Paco Cinematografica
January 2, 2013	Maniac	France	distribution only; produced by La Petite Reine
January 30, 2013	Miffy the Movie	Netherlands	distribution only; produced by Telescreen Filmproducties, KRO and A. Film Production
February 1, 2013	Berserk: The Golden Age Arc III: The Advent	Japan	theatrical distribution only; produced by Studio 4°C
February 1, 2013	David Loman	Taiwan	theatrical distribution only; produced by Polyface Films and Vision Film Production
February 7, 2013	Kokowääh 2	Germany	co-production with Barefoot Films and Béla Jarzyk Production
February 7, 2013	Studio illegale	Italy	distribution only; co-production with IBC Movie, Publispei and Madeleine
February 23, 2013	A Certain Magical Index: The Movie – The Miracle of Endymion	Japan	distribution only; produced by J.C.Staff
February 28, 2013	Tutti contro tutti	Italy	distribution only; produced by Fandango
March 3, 2013	I'm So Excited!	Spain	Spanish theatrical and Italian distribution only; produced by El Deseo
March 7, 2013	Girl on a Bicycle	Germany	distribution only; produced by Wiedemann & Berg Film Production
March 14, 2013	Gallipoli: End of the Road	Turkey	theatrical distribution only; produced by Fono Film and TT Film
March 27, 2013	The Last Days	Spain	distribution only; Morena Films, Antena 3 Films and Rebelion Terrestre
March 28, 2013	The Noble Family	Mexico	distribution only; produced by Alazraki Films
April 17, 2013	Upside Down	France	distribution only; produced by Onyx Films and Studio 37
April 26, 2013	Shield of Straw	Japan	
July 3, 2013	Queens of the Ring	France	distribution only; produced by La Petite Reine
July 6, 2013	Gintama: The Movie: The Final Chapter: Be Forever Yorozuya	Japan	distribution only; produced by Sunrise
July 26, 2013	Three-60	Spain	distribution only; produced by Bowfinger International Pictures, Atresmedia Cine and Zinea Sortzen
August 15, 2013	Grossstadtklein	Germany	co-production with Mr. Brown Entertainment and SevenPictures Film
August 16, 2013	Zone Pro Site: The Moveable Feast	Taiwan	Taiwanese and Singaporean theatrical distribution only; produced by 1 Production Film Co. and Ocean Deep Films
September 13, 2013	Unforgiven	Japan	co-production with Nikkatsu and Office Shirous
September 13, 2013	Family United	Spain	distribution only; produced by Atresmedia Cine, Atípica Films and MOD Producciones
September 26, 2013	No-Eared Bunny and Two-Eared Chick	Germany	co-production with Rothkirch/Cartoon-Film and Barefoot Films
October 5, 2013	R100	Japan	theatrical distribution only; co-production with Phantom Film and Yoshimoto Kogyo Company
October 17, 2013	A Small Southern Enterprise	Italy	distribution only; produced by Paco Cinematografica
October 17, 2013	Frau Ella	Germany	distribution only; produced by Pantaleon Films and Cactus Films
October 18, 2013	Bald Mountain	Brazil	distribution only; produced by Paranoid
October 24, 2013	The Almost Perfect Man	Germany	distribution only; produced by UFA Cinema and Degeto Film
October 26, 2013	Puella Magi Madoka Magica: The Movie - Rebellion	Japan	distribution only; produced by Shaft
November 14, 2013	The Fifth Wheel	Italy	co-production with Fandango and OGI Film
November 22, 2013	It All Began When I Met You	Japan	
December 5, 2013	Three Many Weddings	Spain	distribution only; produced by Think Studio, Ciudadano Ciskul, Apaches Entertainment and Atresmedia Cine
December 25, 2013	Buddy	Germany	co-production with herbX Film

== 2014 ==
Release Date	Title	Country	Notes
January 1, 2014	A Boss in the Living Room	Italy	distribution only; produced by Cattleya
January 18, 2014	Black Butler	Japan	
January 24, 2014	Mindscape	Spain	distribution only; produced by Ombra Films, Antena 3 Films and The Safran Company
February 6, 2014	Joy of Fatherhood	Germany	distribution only; produced by Wiedemann & Berg Film Production and Pantaleon Films
February 14, 2014	A Small September Affair	Turkey	theatrical distribution only; produced by Ay Yapım
February 22, 2014	Giovanni's Island	Japan	theatrical distribution only; produced by Production I.G
February 27, 2014	A Woman as a Friend	Italy	co-production with Fandango
March 14, 2014	Ironclad: Battle For Blood	United Kingdom	distribution only; produced by Mythic International Entertainment, International Pictures One and Gloucester Place Films
March 28, 2014	Kamikaze	Spain	distribution only; produced by Atresmedia Cine, Cangrejo Films and Globomedia
April 3, 2014	Betibú	Argentina	distribution only; produced by Telefe and Haddock Films
May 30, 2014	Monsterz	Japan	distribution only; produced by Nippon Television Network Corporation and Twins Japan
July 11, 2014	Meeting Dr. Sun	Taiwan	theatrical distribution only; produced by 1 Production Film and Lan Se Production
August 1, 2014	Rurouni Kenshin: Kyoto Inferno	Japan	distribution in Japan, the Philippines, Singapore, the U.K. and Ireland only; produced by Amuse Inc., Shueisha, KDDI and GyaO!
August 6, 2014	Colt 45	France	distribution only; produced by La Petite Reine and Orange Studio
August 20, 2014	SMS	France	distribution only; produced by Trésor Films
August 21, 2014	Wild Tales	Argentina	Latin American, Spanish and French distribution only; produced by Kramer & Sigman Films, El Deseo and Telefe Productions
September 11, 2014	Rio I Love You	Brazil	co-production with Conspiração Filmes
September 13, 2014	Rurouni Kenshin: The Legend Ends	Japan	distribution in Japan, the Philippines, Singapore and the U.K. only; produced by Amuse Inc., Shueisha, KDDI and GyaO!
September 26, 2014	Marshland	Spain	distribution only; produced by Atípica Films, Sacromonte Films and Atresmedia Cine
September 26, 2014	Partners in Crime	Taiwan	theatrical distribution only; produced by Arrow Film Production Co., B'in Music and Double Edge Entertainment
October 1, 2014	The Missionaries	France	distribution only; produced by Tabo Tabo Films and Arena Productions
October 2, 2014	Coming Soon	Turkey	theatrical distribution only; produced by CMYLMZ Fikirsanat and Nulook Production
October 16, 2014	... E fuori nevica!	Italy	distribution only; produced by Cinemaundici and Chi è di Scena
October 24, 2014	Coming In	Germany	co-production with Summerstorm Entertainment
November 26, 2014	The Search	France	distribution only; produced by La Petite Reine
November 28, 2014	Mortadelo and Filemon: Mission Implausible	Spain	distribution only; produced by Ilion Animation Studios
December 5, 2014	Get Santa	United Kingdom	distribution only; produced by Altitude, Scott Free Films, BFI, Screen Yorkshire and Ingenious
December 25, 2014	Head Full of Honey	Germany	co-production with Barefoot Films and SevenPictures Film

== 2015 ==
Release Date	Title	Country	Notes
January 29, 2015	Da muss Mann durch	Germany	co-production with Neue Film Produktion
February 19, 2015	Traumfrauen	Germany	co-production with Hellinger / Doll Filmproduktion and Decker Bros. Entertainment
February 19, 2015	The Legendary Giulia and Other Miracles	Italy	co-production with Italian International Film
February 19, 2015	Zhong Kui: Snow Girl and the Dark Crystal	Hong Kong	distribution in Hong Kong, Taiwan, Malaysia and Vietnam only; co-production with Village Roadshow Pictures Asia, Beijing Enlight Pictures, Desen International Media, K. Pictures and Shenzhen Wus Entertainment
February 27, 2015	8 Saniye	Turkey	Turkish theatrical distribution and German distribution only; produced by Böcek Yapim, BKM Film, Galata Film and Barefoot Films
March 6, 2015	Off Course	Spain	distribution only; produced by Atresmedia Cine
March 19, 2015	La solita commedia: Inferno	Italy	distribution only; produced by Wildside
March 19, 2015	The Duel: A Story Where Truth Is Mere Detail	Brazil	co-production with RioFilme, Stopline Films and Total Entertainment
March 26, 2015	The Manny	Germany	distribution only; produced by Erfttal Film, ARRI Productions and Pantaleon Films
April 2, 2015	Ghosthunters: On Icy Trails	Germany	co-production with Lucky Bird Pictures, Ripple World Pictures and Fish Blowing Bubbles
April 25, 2015	Ryuzo and the Seven Henchmen	Japan	theatrical distribution only; produced by Office Kitano
May 8, 2015	Nothing in Return	Spain	distribution only; produced by El Niño Producciones
June 27, 2015	Strayer's Chronicle	Japan	distribution only; produced by Twins Japan
August 13, 2015	The Clan	Spain	distribution only; produced by K&S Films, Matanza Cine and El Deseo
September 4, 2015	Spy Time	Spain	distribution only; produced by Agente Secreto 2015, Institut Català de les Empreses Culturals and Instituto de Crédito Oficial
September 19, 2015	Heroine Disqualified	Japan	theatrical distribution only; co-production with Dentsu
September 25, 2015	Retribution	Spain	distribution only; produced by Vaca Films, Atresmedia Cine and La Ferme! Productions
November 19, 2015	Them Who?	Italy	co-production with Picomedia
November 26, 2015	Highway To Hellas	Germany	co-production with Pantaleon Films and Arri Film & TV Services
December 24, 2015	I'm Off Then	Germany	co-production with UFA Fiction and Feine Filme
December 25, 2015	Palm Trees in the Snow	Spain	co-production with Nostromo Pictures, Dynamo Producciones and Atresmedia Cine
December 25, 2015	Delibal	Turkey	distribution only; produced by Moon Construction and Ay Yapım
December 31, 2015	We Are Family	Taiwan	distribution only; produced by C2M Media, Double Edge Entertainment and Reel Asia Pictures

== 2016 ==
Release Date	Title	Country	Notes
January 5, 2016	Solo	Italy	distribution only; produced by Cinemaundici and Ela Film
January 7, 2016	Friend Request	Germany	distribution in Germany, Austria and the U.K. only; produced by Wiedemann & Berg Film Production, SevenPictures Film and Two Oceans Productions
January 21, 2016	Se mi lasci non vale	Italy	co-production with Italian International Film
February 3, 2016	Tschiller: Off Duty	Germany	co-production with Syrreal Entertainment and Barefoot Films
February 16, 2016	Selector Destructed WIXOSS	Japan	distribution only; produced by Fuji Television Network, J.C. Staff, Showgate and Takara Tomy
February 18, 2016	Onda Su Onda	Italy	co-production with La Productora Films and Indiana Production
February 25, 2016	The Most Beautiful Day	Germany	co-production with Pantaleon Films
February 26, 2016	We Need to Talk	Spain	distribution only; Atípica Films and Atresmedia Cine
March 19, 2016	Erased	Japan	
April 7, 2016	De Onde Eu Te Vejo	Brazil	co-production with Bossa Nova Films and Globo Filmes
April 8, 2016	Julieta	Spain	Spanish theatrical and Italian distribution only; produced by El Deseo, RTVE, Canal+ France, Echo Lake Entertainment and Ciné+
April 8, 2016	The Man Who Knew Infinity	United Kingdom	distribution only; produced by Pressman Film, Xeitgeist Entertainment Group and Cayenne Pepper Productions
April 21, 2016	At the End of the Tunnel	Argentina	distribution only; produced by Tornasol Films, El Árbol, Haddock Films, Hernández y Fernández PC and Mistery Producciones AIE
April 29, 2016	Terra Formars	Japan	Japanese and Singaporean distribution only
June 2, 2016	Seitenwechsel	Germany	co-production with H&V Entertainment and SevenPictures Film
July 7, 2016	Stadtlandliebe	Germany	co-production with NFP
July 23, 2016	Accel World: Infinite Burst	Japan	distribution only; produced by Sunrise
August 18, 2016	Conni & Co	Germany	co-production with Producers at Work and Barefoot Films
September 3, 2016	The Age of Shadows	South Korea	South Korean and Singaporean distribution only; co-production with Grimm Pictures and Harbin Films
September 15, 2016	SMS für Dich	Germany	co-production with Hellinger / Doll Filmproduktion
September 23, 2016	Smoke & Mirrors	Spain	distribution only; produced by Zeta Cinema, Atresmedia Cine and Atípica Films
September 23, 2016	The Girl with All the Gifts	United Kingdom	distribution only; produced by BFI, Creative England and Altitude Film Entertainment
October 6, 2016	Unsere Zeit ist jetzt	Germany	co-production with Mr. Brown Entertainment, Chimperator Films and Barefoot Films
October 28, 2016	Forêt Debussy	Taiwan	distribution only; produced by 1 Production Film Company, You Love Agent & PR Executive and Filmagic Pictures
October 28, 2016	May God Save Us	Spain	distribution only; produced by Tornasol Films and Atresmedia Cine
October 29, 2016	Death Note: Light Up the New World	Japan	theatrical distribution only
November 3, 2016	Welcome to Germany	Germany	distribution only; produced by Wiedemann & Berg Film Production, SevenPictures Film and Sentana Film
November 9, 2016	What's the Big Deal	Italy	co-production with Italian International Film
November 12, 2016	Museum	Japan	Japanese and Singaporean distribution only
December 2, 2016	Villaviciosa de al lado	Spain	distribution only; produced by Atresmedia Cine and Producciones Aparte
December 10, 2016	Monster Strike The Movie	Japan	distribution only; produced by Liden Films, Ultra Super Pictures and XFlag Pictures
December 15, 2016	Poveri ma ricchi	Italy	co-production with Wildside S.r.l.
December 25, 2016	Vier gegen die Bank	Germany	co-production with Hellinger / Doll Filmproduktion

== 2017 ==
Release Date	Title	Country	Notes
January 6, 2017	The Invisible Guest	Spain	distribution only; produced by Think Studio, Atresmedia Cine, Colosé Producciones and Nostromo Pictures
January 26, 2017	The Village of No Return	Taiwan; China	Taiwanese distribution only; produced by 1 Production Film, Mandarin Vision and In Entertainment
February 18, 2017	Gukoroku - Traces of Sin	Japan	theatrical distribution only; produced by TV Tokyo and Office Kitano
February 22, 2017	A Single Rider	South Korea	distribution only; produced by Perfect Storm Films
February 24, 2017	Kanavu Variyam	India	distribution only; produced by DCKAP Cinemas
March 18, 2017	Napping Princess	Japan	distribution only; produced by Signal.MD
April 12, 2017	Moglie e marito	Italy	co-production with Picomedia and Groenlandia
April 20, 2017	Conni und Co 2 - Das Geheimnis des T-Rex	Germany	co-production with Producers at Work Film
April 28, 2017	Getaway Plan	Spain	distribution only; produced by LaZona, Runaway Films AIE and Atresmedia Cine
April 29, 2017	Blade of the Immortal	Japan	
May 1, 2017	Maradonapoli	Italy	co-production with Cinemaundici and Rancilio Cube
May 18, 2017	I Peggiori	Italy	co-production with Italian International Film
June 10, 2017	Memoirs of a Murderer	Japan	
June 16, 2017	Lord, Give Me Patience	Spain	distribution only; produced by DLO Producciones, Suroeste Films and Atresmedia Cine
July 14, 2017	Gintama	Japan	co-production with Aniplex
August 4, 2017	JoJo's Bizarre Adventure: Diamond Is Unbreakable Chapter I	Japan	theatrical co-distribution with Toho only; produced by TBS Pictures and OLM
August 17, 2017	The Summit	Argentina	Latin American and Spanish distribution only; produced by Kramer & Sigman Films, La Unión de los Ríos and Mod Producciones
August 17, 2017	Bullyparade: The Movie	Germany	co-production with Herbx Film
August 23, 2017	V.I.P.	South Korea	distribution only; produced by Peppermint & Company
August 24, 2017	Bingo: The King of the Mornings	Brazil	co-production with Gullane and Empryean
September 7, 2017	Outrage Coda	Japan	distribution only; produced by Bandai Visual, Office Kitano and TV Tokyo
September 14, 2017	High Society	Germany	co-production with Hellinger / Doll Filmproduktion and Decker Bros. Entertainment
September 21, 2017	L'equilibrio	Italy	co-production with Cinemaundici
September 21, 2017	Divórcio	Brazil	co-production with Filmland International
October 6, 2017	Toc Toc	Spain	distribution only; produced by Atresmedia Cine, La Zona, Lazonafilms and Wind Films
October 12, 2017	Como se Tornar o Pior Aluno da Escola	Brazil	co-production with Telecine, Clube Filmes, Paris Filmes; distributed by Downtown Filmes
October 26, 2017	Couple Therapy for Cheaters	Italy	co-production with Cinemaundici and Ela Film
October 27, 2017	Ayla: The Daughter of War	Turkey; South Korea	Turkish distribution only; produced by Dijital Sanatlar Production
October 28, 2017	My Teacher	Japan	
November 11, 2017	Haikara-San: Here Comes Miss Modern Part 1	Japan	co-production with Nippon Animation
November 23, 2017	In the Fade	Germany	co-production with Bombero International, Macassar Productions, Pathé, Dorje Film and Corazón International
December 1, 2017	Fullmetal Alchemist	Japan	
December 7, 2017	Forget About Nick	Germany	distribution only; produced by Heimatfilm
December 14, 2017	Poveri ma ricchissimi	Italy	co-production with Wildside
December 28, 2017	Naples in Veils	Italy	co-production with R&C Produzioni and Faros Film

== 2018 ==
Release Date	Title	Country	Notes
January 18, 2018	Hot Dog	Germany	co-production with Pantaleon Films and Erfttal Film & Fernsehproduktion
February 10, 2018	Color Me True	Japan	theatrical distribution only; produced by Fuji Television Network, Horipro, Dentsu and KDDI
March 1, 2018	Motorrad	Brazil	
March 8, 2018	A Jar Full of Life	Germany	co-production with Pantaleon Films, Traumfabrik Babelsberg and Erfttal Film & Fernsehproduktion
March 10, 2018	Last Winter, We Parted	Japan	distribution only; produced by C&I entertainment
March 29, 2018	Jim Button and Luke the Engine Driver	Germany	co-production with Malao Film and Rat Pack Filmproduktion
April 5, 2018	That's Life	Italy	co-production with Indigo Film and Roman Citizen
April 12, 2018	Playmaker	Germany	co-production with Frisbeefilms and CINE PLUS
April 27, 2018	Marmalade Boy	Japan	
May 1, 2018	Champion	South Korea	distribution only; produced by Core Corner
May 3, 2018	55 Steps	Germany	distribution only; produced by Elsani Film and MMC Studios
June 14, 2018	Maybe A Love Story	Brazil	co-production with 20th Century Fox and Chocolate Filmes
June 22, 2018	El mundo Es Suyo	Spain	distribution only; produced by Atresmedia Cine, Balance Media Entertainment and Mundo Ficción
June 27, 2018	Budapest	France	distribution only; produced by Labyrinthe Films
June 28, 2018	The Witch: Part 1. The Subversion	South Korea	distribution only; produced by Gold Moon Film Production
July 20, 2018	Bleach	Japan	co-production with Cine Bazar
July 25, 2018	Illang: The Wolf Brigade	South Korea	distribution only; produced by Lewis Pictures
September 7, 2018	The Realm	Spain	distribution only; produced by Tornasol Films Trianera PC AIE, Atresmedia Cine, Bowfinger International Pictures, Le Pacte and Mondex & Cie
September 13, 2018	The Accused	Argentina	distribution only; produced by K&S Films, Rei Cine, Kramer & Sigman Films, PIANO, Sam Spiegel International Film Lab and Telefe
September 14, 2018	Real Girl	Japan	theatrical distribution only; co-production with Nippon TV, CTV, Dentsu, FBS, HTV, Parco, Ten Carat, Kodansha, VAP, Miyagi Television Broadcasting, Sapporo Television Broadcasting, SDT, Yomiuri TV, Nippon Shuppan Hanbai, GYAO! and DN Dream Partners|Dub, Inc.
September 20, 2018	Klassentreffen 1.0	Germany	co-production with Barefoot Films, Nordisk Film and SevenPictures Film
October 11, 2018	Cut Off	Germany	co-production with Ziegler Film and Syrreal Entertainment
October 19, 2018	Haikara-San: Here Comes Miss Modern Part 2	Japan	co-production with Nippon Animation
October 25, 2018	One Of The Family	Italy	co-production with Cinemaundici
November 2, 2018	Dear Ex	Taiwan	distribution only; produced by Dear Studio, Comic Communication Studio, Ocean Entertainment and Hervoice Concept
November 30, 2018	Mirage	Spain	distribution only; produced by Atresmedia Cine, Colosé Producciones and Think Studio
December 6, 2018	100 Things	Germany	co-production with Pantaleon Films
December 6, 2018	La Prima Pietra	Italy	co-production with Fandango
December 13, 2018	The Invisible Witness	Italy	co-production with Picomedia
December 14, 2018	We Hope For A Blooming	Japan	distribution only; produced by Office Crescendo
December 25, 2018	All About Me	Germany	co-production with UFA Fiction and Feine Filme

== 2019 ==
Release Date	Title	Country	Notes
January 10, 2019	Beware the Gorilla	Italy	co-production with Wildside
January 11, 2019	White Snake	China	co-production with Light Chaser Animation Studios
January 25, 2019	12 Suicidal Teens	Japan	
February 1, 2019	Snow Flower	Japan	distribution only; produced by A FILMS
February 9, 2019	The Golden Glove	Germany	co-production with Bombero International and Pathé
February 13, 2019	All Inclusive	France	distribution only; produced by Curiosa Films and Marvelous Productions
February 14, 2019	Sweethearts	Germany	co-production with Hellinger / Doll Filmproduktion
February 15, 2019	Is It Wrong to Try to Pick Up Girls in a Dungeon?: Arrow of the Orion	Japan	distribution only; produced by J.C.Staff
February 15, 2019	Off Course To China	Spain	distribution only; produced by Atresmedia Cine
February 28, 2019	An Almost Ordinary Summer	Italy	distribution only; produced by Picomedia and Groenlandia
March 1, 2019	Until I Meet September's Love	Japan	theatrical distribution only
March 14, 2019	Rocca Changes The World	Germany	co-production with Relevant Film
March 15, 2019	Como novio de pueblo	Mexico	distribution only; produced by Traziende Films
March 15, 2019	Taxi to Gibraltar	Spain	distribution only; produced by La Terraza Films, Atresmedia Cine and Ikiru Films
March 20, 2019	Jo Pil-ho: The Dawning Rage	South Korea	distribution only; produced by Dice Film and Generation Blue Films
April 26, 2019	The Wonderland	Japan	co-production with Aniplex
June 6, 2019	TKKG	Germany	co-production with Kundschafter Filmproduktion and Delta Film
June 28, 2019	The Japon	Spain	distribution only; produced by Atresmedia Cine and DLO Producciones
July 5, 2019	Diner	Japan	
July 25, 2019	Abikalypse	Germany	co-production with Pantaleon Films
August 15, 2019	Heroic Losers	Argentina	distribution only; produced by Kramer & Sigman Films, Kenya Films and MOD Producciones
August 16, 2019	Dance with Me	Japan	
August 21, 2019	Jesters: The Game Changers	South Korea	distribution only; produced by Simplex Films
August 23, 2019	NiNoKuni	Japan	distribution only; produced by OLM, Inc.
August 30, 2019	The Informer	United Kingdom	distribution only; produced by Thunder Road Films, Ingenious Media and Endeavor Content
September 20, 2019	Detention	Taiwan	theatrical distribution only; produced by 1 Production Film Co. and Filmagic Pictures
September 25, 2019	The Battle of Jangsari	South Korea	distribution only; produced by Taewon Entertainment, Film 295 and Finecut
September 26, 2019	Hebe: A Estrela do Brasil	Brazil	co-production with 20th Century Fox and Globo Filmes
October 11, 2019	Way To Find The Best Life	Japan	distribution only; produced by Cine Bazar
November 7, 2019	The Last Cop	Germany	co-production with Westside Filmproduktion, SevenPictures Film and Donar Film
November 14, 2019	My Zoe	Germany	co-production with Amusement Park Films, Electrick Films, Magnolia Mae Films and Metalwork Pictures
November 27, 2019	Bring Me Home	South Korea	distribution only; produced by 26 Company
December 5, 2019	Auerhaus	Germany	co-production with Pantaleon Films, Brainpool Pictures and WS Filmproduktion
December 19, 2019	The Goddess of Fortune	Italy	co-production with R&C Produzioni and Faros Film
December 25, 2019	When Hitler Stole Pink Rabbit	Germany	co-production with Sommerhaus Filmproduktion, La Siala Entertainment, Hugofilm Features and Mia Film

== See also ==
- List of Warner Bros. theatrical animated feature films
- List of Warner Bros. films (2010–2019)
