= CBS Theatrical Films =

American film production unit

- Type: Division
- Predecessor: Cinema Center Films
- Founded: 1979; 47 years ago
- Defunct: November 1985; 41 years ago
- Fate: Closed; assets owned by CBS Broadcasting Inc. and distributed by Paramount Pictures
- Headquarters: United States
- Area served: Worldwide
- Parent: CBS

CBS Theatrical Films, also as CBS Theatrical Films Group, was the film production branch of the American television network, CBS, which was active from 1979 to November 1985.

CBS was also a partner in TriStar Pictures, which started as a joint venture with Columbia Pictures (owned then by The Coca-Cola Company), and Time, Inc.'s HBO. CBS was an owner in TriStar from the start in 1982 to 1985.

== History ==
CBS began its theatrical films operation in 1979, headed by Donald March, and turned the operation into the separate CBS Theatrical Films division on December 2, 1980. In March 1980, the unit was promoted to group level, same as the broadcast and records groups, as CBS Theatrical Films Group with Michael Levy as group president reporting directly to CBS president Thomas H. Wyman. In 1981, Joe Wizan briefly ran the company, replacing Donald March, but he left in 1982 due to creative differences. Before 1985, William Self was president of production. None of its releases were commercial successes.

On December 17, 1984, it was merged with the CBS Worldwide Enterprises branch to form CBS Productions (unrelated to the later production company of the same name). In 1985, CBS Productions decided to wind down their operations, which were fully closed in November 1985.

=== Closure ===
Several factors contributed to the closure of CBS Theatrical Films. As a so-called boutique, it was disadvantaged because it was usually only offered left over films after the major studios had selected the more likely commercial successes. Television movies did better in the ratings than theater films already released via cable and video. With additional startup boutiques, the market was overcrowded causing box office strain at the same time movie production costs doubled to $10 million with marketing matching that level.

Another factor was that as a boutique, CBS Theatrical Films did not have a distribution system, so it had to release its films through major studios, which sometimes resulted in disadvantageous release dates. CBS announced CBS Theatrical Films's closure in November 1985. After the closure, CBS Productions' assets were sold to international film backer J&M Film Sales, which included all the foreign licensing contracts that were previously handled by the studio, and four planned CBS titles were sold to J&M Film Sales on May 28, 1986. All CBS Theatrical Films productions were released through in the US through Warner Bros. Pictures with the exception of The Challenge and their final production The Lightship were released through Embassy Pictures and Castle Hill Productions respectively. Today, CBS Media Ventures distributes the library for television, Paramount Pictures holds theatrical rights, and home entertainment rights are licensed by CBS Home Entertainment to Paramount Home Entertainment and Kino Lorber for certain films.
