= List of Warner Bros. films (1980–1989) =

This is a list of films produced, co-produced, and/or distributed by Warner Bros. Pictures in the 1980s.

== 1980 ==
Release date	Title	Notes
January 18, 1980	Heart Beat	distribution only; produced by Orion Pictures, Edward R. Pressman Productions and Further Productions
February 8, 1980	Just Tell Me What You Want	—
February 8, 1980	The Ninth Configuration (Note: Owned by Shout! Studios (via Westchester Films))	North American theatrical distribution only
February 29, 1980	Simon	distribution only; produced by Orion Pictures
March 28, 1980	When Time Ran Out	distribution only; produced by International Cinema Corporation
March 28, 1980	Tom Horn	distribution only; produced by First Artists and Solar Productions
March 28, 1980	Gilda Live	co-production with Broadway Pictures
March 28, 1980	Die Laughing	distribution only; produced by Orion Pictures
May 9, 1980	Friday the 13th (Note: Skydance now owns worldwide rights to this film, having acquired Paramount Global in 2025 and Warner Bros. Discovery in 2026.)	international distribution only; produced by Georgetown Productions; distributed in North America by Paramount Pictures
May 23, 1980	The Shining	co-production with the Producer Circle Company and Peregrine Productions; Inducted into the National Film Registry in 2018
June 6, 1980	Up the Academy	—
June 11, 1980	Bronco Billy	distribution only
July 18, 1980	No Nukes	North American theatrical distribution only; produced by Muse Foundation
July 18, 1980	Honeysuckle Rose	—
July 25, 1980	Caddyshack	distribution only; produced by Orion Pictures
August 8, 1980	The Fiendish Plot of Dr. Fu Manchu	distribution only; produced by Orion Pictures and Playboy Productions; Japanese theatrical rights licensed to Nippon Herald Films
August 8, 1980	Battle Beyond the Stars	international distribution with Orion Pictures only; produced by New World Pictures
September 5, 1980 (Note: Released in Australian theaters on August 18, 1980.)	The Big Brawl (Note: Owned by Fortune Star)	North American distribution, U.K., Irish, Australian and New Zealand theatrical distribution only; produced by Golden Harvest
September 14, 1980	AC/DC: Let There Be Rock	North American distribution only; produced by High Speed Productions and Sebastian International
September 18, 1980	Super Fuzz	international co-distribution outside Italy with Columbia Pictures only; distributed in North America by AVCO Embassy Pictures
September 25, 1980	Divine Madness	distribution only; produced by the Ladd Company
October 3, 1980	One-Trick Pony	—
October 3, 1980	Oh, God! Book II	—
October 10, 1980	Private Benjamin	distribution only
October 31, 1980	The Awakening	North American distribution with Orion Pictures only
November 7, 1980	The Chain Reaction	international distribution outside Australia and New Zealand only
December 17, 1980	Any Which Way You Can	distribution only; produced by the Malpaso Company and Robert Daley Productions
December 25, 1980	First Family	co-production with the IndieProd Company
December 25, 1980	Altered States	distribution only

== 1981 ==
Release date	Title	Notes
February 11, 1981	Sphinx	distribution only; produced by Orion Pictures
March 13, 1981	Back Roads (Note: Owned by Paramount Pictures (via CBS))	North American theatrical distribution only; produced by CBS Theatrical Films
March 27, 1981 (Note: Released in Japanese theaters on February 11, 1981.)	Eyes of a Stranger	distribution only; produced by Georgetown Productions
April 4, 1981	This Is Elvis	co-production with the Wolper Organization
April 10, 1981	Excalibur	distribution only; produced by Orion Pictures; West German and Austrian theatrical rights licensed to Neue Constantin Film
April 24, 1981	The Hand	distribution only; produced by Orion Pictures, Edward R. Pressman Productions and Ixtlan
April 1981	The Man Who Saw Tomorrow	North American and select international distribution only; produced by the Wolper Organization
May 8, 1981	Alligator	select international theatrical distribution only; produced by Group 1 Films
May 15, 1981	Ms .45	international distribution only; produced by Navaron Films; distributed in North America by Rochelle Films
May 22, 1981	Outland	distribution only; produced by the Ladd Company
June 19, 1981 (Note: Released in international theaters on December 4, 1980.)	Superman II	North American and select international distribution only; produced by Dovemead, Ltd.
July 17, 1981	Arthur	distribution only; produced by Orion Pictures
July 24, 1981	Wolfen	distribution only; produced by Orion Pictures and King-Hitzig Productions; theatrical rights licensed to UGC for France, Tobis Film for West Germany and Toei for Japan
July 31, 1981	Under the Rainbow	distribution only; produced by Orion Pictures and Innovisions/ECA
August 19, 1981	Prince of the City	distribution only; produced by Orion Pictures; West German theatrical rights licensed to Concorde Filmverleih
August 22, 1981	Evilspeak	select international distribution only; produced by Leisure Investment Company
August 28, 1981	Body Heat	distribution only; produced by the Ladd Company
September 25, 1981	Chariots of Fire	North American distribution with the Ladd Company only; produced by Allied Stars and Enigma Productions
September 25, 1981	So Fine	co-production with Lobell/Bergman Productions
October 30, 1981	Looker	distribution only; produced by the Ladd Company
November 20, 1981	The Looney Looney Looney Bugs Bunny Movie	co-production with Warner Bros. Animation
December 11, 1981	Rollover	distribution with Orion Pictures only; produced by IPC Films
December 12, 1981	Who Finds a Friend Finds a Treasure	international co-distribution outside Italy with Columbia Pictures only
December 18, 1981	Sharky's Machine	distribution only; produced by Orion Pictures and Deliverance Productions

== 1982 ==
Release date	Title	Notes
February 5, 1982	Personal Best	distribution only; produced by the Geffen Company
February 12, 1982 (Note: Released in West German theaters on November 6, 1981.)	Tragedy of a Ridiculous Man	distribution outside Italy with the Ladd Company only; produced by Fiction Cinematografica
March 1, 1982	Banana Joe	international co-distribution outside Italy with Columbia Pictures only
March 19, 1982	Deathtrap	—
April 30, 1982	Soup for One	—
May 21, 1982 (Note: Released in international theaters on December 24, 1981.)	The Road Warrior	Australian film; distribution only; produced by Kennedy Miller Entertainment also known as Mad Max 2 in international regions
May 28, 1982	The Escape Artist (Note: Owned by American Zoetrope, with U.S. distribution rights split between Rialto Pictures for theatrical and Lionsgate for certain rights)	North American theatrical distribution with Orion Pictures only; produced by Zoetrope Studios
June 18, 1982	Firefox	distribution only; produced by Malpaso Productions
June 25, 1982	Blade Runner	North American theatrical and international distribution outside Hong Kong only; produced by the Ladd Company, Blade Runner Partnership and Shaw Brothers; Inducted into the National Film Registry in 1993
July 16, 1982	A Midsummer Night's Sex Comedy (Note: Director Woody Allen would retain rights to this film after its release, later selling it in 2000 to MGM, Orion Pictures' parent)	distribution only; produced by Orion Pictures
July 23, 1982	The World According to Garp	co-production with Pan Arts, Inc.
July 30, 1982	Night Shift	distribution only; produced by the Ladd Company
September 17, 1982	Hammett	North American distribution with Orion Pictures only; produced by Zoetrope Studios
October 1, 1982	Hey Good Lookin'	North American distribution only; produced by Bakshi Productions
October 1, 1982	I, the Jury (Note: Released in international theaters on April 22, 1982.)	international distribution only; produced by American Cinema Productions; distributed in North America by 20th Century Fox
October 15, 1982	Love Child	distribution only; produced by the Ladd Company
November 7, 1982	Five Days One Summer	distribution only; produced by the Ladd Company
November 10, 1982	Creepshow	North American distribution only; produced by Laurel Show, Inc.
November 19, 1982	Bugs Bunny's 3rd Movie: 1001 Rabbit Tales	co-production with Warner Bros. Animation
December 15, 1982	Honkytonk Man	co-production with the Malpaso Company
December 17, 1982	Best Friends	co-production with Timberlane Films

== 1983 ==
Release date	Title	Notes
January 21, 1983	Independence Day	—
February 17, 1983	Local Hero	North American distribution only; produced by Enigma Productions, Goldcrest Films and Celandine Films
February 18, 1983	Table for Five	North American theatrical distribution only; produced by CBS Theatrical Films
February 18, 1983	Lovesick	distribution only; produced by the Ladd Company
February 25, 1983	Cat and Dog	international co-distribution outside Italy with Columbia Pictures only
March 18, 1983	High Road to China	North American distribution only; produced by Golden Harvest and Jardan Film
March 25, 1983	The Outsiders (Note: Co-owned by American Zoetrope, with U.K. and Irish distribution rights currently held by Zoetrope's international contractor StudioCanal (through its British division))	North American, U.K. and Irish distribution only; produced by Zoetrope Studios
April 1, 1983	Deadly Eyes	U.S. distribution only; produced by Golden Harvest and Filmtrust Productions
April 15, 1983	Better Late Than Never	U.S. theatrical distribution only; produced by Golden Harvest
April 22, 1983	Cracking Up	U.S. distribution only; produced by Orgolini-Nelson Productions
April 29, 1983	Blue Skies Again	U.S. distribution only; produced by Lantana Productions
June 3, 1983	The Man with Two Brains	distribution only; produced by Aspen Film Society
June 17, 1983	Superman III	international theatrical and North American distribution only; produced by Dovemead, Ltd.
June 24, 1983	Twilight Zone: The Movie	—
July 1, 1983	Stroker Ace	international theatrical, North American home media and television distribution only; co-production with Universal Pictures and Yahi Productions
July 15, 1983	Zelig	distribution only; produced by Orion Pictures
July 29, 1983	National Lampoon's Vacation	—
August 5, 1983	Twice Upon a Time	distribution with the Ladd Company only; produced by Korty Films and Lucasfilm Ltd.
August 5, 1983	Daffy Duck's Fantastic Island	co-production with Warner Bros. Animation
August 5, 1983	Risky Business	distribution only; produced by the Geffen Company
August 12, 1983	Cujo (Note: Owned by Paramount Pictures (via Republic Pictures))	North American and West German distribution only; produced by Taft Entertainment Company and Sunn Classic Pictures
September 23, 1983	Go for It	international co-distribution outside Italy with Columbia Pictures only
October 7, 1983	Never Say Never Again (Note: Producer Jack Schwartzman would retain ownership of the film until 1997, when MGM, owner of the Eon James Bond film series, acquired the film from Schwartzman's estate)	North and Latin American, U.K., Irish, Spanish and Danish distribution only; produced by Taliafilm
October 21, 1983	The Right Stuff	distribution only; produced by the Ladd Company and Chartoff-Winkler Productions; Inducted into the National Film Registry in 2013
November 4, 1983	Deal of the Century	—
November 10, 1983	Star 80	distribution only; produced by the Ladd Company
November 11, 1983	Hearts and Armour	distribution outside Italy only
November 23, 1983	Of Unknown Origin	distribution outside Canada only; produced by Mutual Productions, Canadian Film Development Corporation and Famous Players
November 25, 1983	The Lift	Dutch film; international distribution outside the Netherlands and Belgium only; produced by Sigma Film Productions
December 9, 1983	Sudden Impact	co-production with the Malpaso Company

== 1984 ==
Release date	Title	Notes
January 18, 1984	Deep in the Heart (Note: Owned by StudioCanal)	U.S. theatrical distribution only; produced by Thorn EMI Films and Krestel Films
February 8, 1984	Army Brats	Dutch film; international distribution outside the Benelux only; produced by Movies Filmproductions
February 17, 1984	Lassiter	North American distribution only; produced by Golden Harvest
March 9, 1984	Mike's Murder	distribution only; produced by the Ladd Company
March 23, 1984	Police Academy	distribution only; produced by the Ladd Company
March 30, 1984	Purple Hearts	distribution only; produced by the Ladd Company
March 30, 1984	Greystoke: The Legend of Tarzan, Lord of the Apes	—
April 13, 1984	Swing Shift	co-production with Lantana Productions, the Hawn/Sylbert Movie Company and Jerry Bick Productions
May 18, 1984	Finders Keepers	North American theatrical distribution only; produced by CBS Theatrical Films
June 1, 1984	Once Upon a Time in America (Note: Owned by Regency Enterprises, with Disney (via 20th Century Studios) handling distribution; Warner Bros. previously reclaimed international rights to Once Upon a Time in America upon signing a deal with Regency in 1991 and ended in 1999, but continued to retain distribution rights until 2015, when it was reverted back to Regency)	North American distribution with the Ladd Company only; produced by Embassy International Pictures
June 8, 1984	Gremlins	co-production with Amblin Entertainment
June 29, 1984	Cannonball Run II	North and Hispanic American distribution only; produced by Golden Harvest
July 20, 1984	The NeverEnding Story	distribution in North and Latin America, the U.K., Ireland, France, Sweden, Denmark, Norway and Finland only; produced by Neue Constantin Film
July 27, 1984	Purple Rain	distribution only; produced by Purple Films Company; Inducted into the National Film Registry in 2019
August 3, 1984	Grandview, U.S.A.	North American theatrical distribution only; produced by CBS Theatrical Films
August 17, 1984	Tightrope	co-production with the Malpaso Company
August 24, 1984	Cal	Irish film; North American, U.K., Irish, French, Australian and New Zealand distribution only; produced by Goldcrest Films and Enigma Productions
September 21, 1984	Windy City	North American theatrical distribution only; produced by CBS Theatrical Films
September 28, 1984	Irreconcilable Differences	North American theatrical distribution only; produced by Lantana Films
October 19, 1984	The Little Drummer Girl	co-production with Pan Arts, Inc.
October 26, 1984	American Dreamer	North American theatrical distribution only; produced by CBS Theatrical Films
November 2, 1984	The Killing Fields	British film; North American and select international distribution only; produced by Goldcrest Films, International Film Investors and Enigma Productions
November 7, 1984	Oh, God! You Devil	—
November 16, 1984	Razorback	North American and French distribution only; produced by UAA Films Limited
December 7, 1984	City Heat	co-production with the Malpaso Company and Deliverance Productions
December 21, 1984	Protocol	co-production with Hawn/Sylbert Film Company

== 1985 ==
Release date	Title	Notes
January 25, 1985	Fandango	North American theatrical, worldwide home media and television distribution only; produced by Amblin Entertainment
February 15, 1985	Vision Quest	co-production with the Guber-Peters Company; Renamed as Crazy for You in the United Kingdom and Australia
February 15, 1985	Lost in America	distribution only; produced by the Geffen Company
February 15, 1985	Beyond the Walls	distribution outside Israel only; produced by April Films
March 20, 1985	All Mixed Up	French film; distribution only; produced by Oliane Productions
March 29, 1985	Police Academy 2: Their First Assignment	distribution only; produced by the Ladd Company
April 12, 1985	Ladyhawke	North American distribution only; co-production with 20th Century Fox
May 19, 1985	Doin' Time	North American and select international distribution with the Ladd Company only; produced by Filmcorp Productions
June 7, 1985	The Goonies	co-production with Amblin Entertainment; Inducted into the National Film Registry in 2017
June 28, 1985	Pale Rider	co-production with the Malpaso Company
July 10, 1985 (Note: Released in Japanese theaters on June 29, 1985.)	Mad Max Beyond Thunderdome	Australian film; distribution only; produced by Kennedy Miller Productions
July 26, 1985	National Lampoon's European Vacation	—
August 2, 1985	Sesame Street Presents: Follow That Bird	distribution only; produced by Children's Television Workshop and The Jim Henson Company
August 9, 1985	Pee-wee's Big Adventure	co-production with Aspen Film Society
August 16, 1985	American Flyers	co-production with WW Productions
August 23, 1985	The Protector	distribution in North America, the U.K., Ireland, West Germany, Italy and Finland theatrically only; produced by Golden Harvest
September 13, 1985	After Hours	distribution with the Geffen Company only; produced by Double Play Productions
September 25, 1985	Mishima: A Life in Four Chapters (Note: Owned by American Zoetrope, with U.S. distribution rights currently licensed to Janus Films and the Criterion Collection, and worldwide sales rights represented by Fortissimo Films)	distribution outside Japan only; produced by Zoetrope Studios, Filmlink International and Lucasfilm Ltd.
October 11, 1985	Better Off Dead	North American theatrical distribution only; produced by CBS Theatrical Films and A&M Films
October 25, 1985	Krush Groove	distribution only; produced by Crystalite Productions
November 1, 1985	Eleni	North American theatrical distribution only; produced by CBS Theatrical Films
November 8, 1985	Target	North American theatrical distribution only; produced by CBS Theatrical Films and the Zanuck/Brown Company
November 15, 1985	Rainbow Brite and the Star Stealer	distribution only; produced by DIC Audiovisuel and Hallmark Properties
December 6, 1985	Spies Like Us	co-production with Landis/Folsey Productions
December 18, 1985	The Color Purple	co-production with Amblin Entertainment and the Guber-Peters Company
December 25, 1985	Revolution	British film; distribution in North America, the U.K., Ireland, France, Belgium and Spain only; produced by Goldcrest Films and Viking Films

== 1986 ==
Release date	Title	Notes
January 17, 1986	The Clan of the Cave Bear	North American distribution only; produced by Producers Sales Organization, the Guber-Peters Company, Jozak/Decade Productions and Jonesfilm
February 14, 1986	Wildcats	co-production with Hawn/Sylbert Film Company
February 21, 1986 (Note: Released in British theaters on September 13, 1985.)	The Frog Prince	British film; North American, U.K. and Irish distribution only; produced by Goldcrest Films
March 21, 1986	Police Academy 3: Back in Training	—
April 25, 1986 (Note: Released in British theaters on February 21, 1986.)	Mr. Love	British film; North American, U.K. and Irish distribution only; produced by Goldcrest Films and Enigma Productions
May 9, 1986	Seven Minutes in Heaven	distribution only; produced by Zoetrope Studios and FR Productions
May 23, 1986	Cobra	distribution outside U.S. television only; co-production with the Cannon Group, Inc.
July 2, 1986	Under the Cherry Moon	—
July 11, 1986	Club Paradise	—
August 8, 1986	One Crazy Summer	co-production with A&M Films
August 15, 1986	A Man and a Woman: 20 Years Later	French film; distribution only; produced by Les Films 13
October 3, 1986	Round Midnight	co-production with Little Bear and PECF
October 10, 1986	True Stories	distribution only; produced by Edward R. Pressman Productions and Gary Kurfirst Pictures
October 10, 1986	Deadly Friend	distribution only; produced by Pan Arts, Inc. and Layton Productions
October 11, 1986	Knights & Emeralds	British film; North American, U.K. and Irish distribution only; produced by Goldcrest Films and Enigma Productions
October 17, 1986	Ratboy	co-production with Malpaso Productions
October 31, 1986	The Mission	British film; North American, U.K., Irish and Spanish distribution only; produced by Goldcrest Films, Kingsmere Productions and Enigma Productions
November 26, 1986	The Mosquito Coast (Note: Co-owned by Teatro della Pace Films)	North American distribution only; produced by the Saul Zaentz Company
December 5, 1986	Heartbreak Ridge	co-production with Malpaso Productions and Jay Weston Productions
December 19, 1986	Little Shop of Horrors	distribution only; produced by the Geffen Company

== 1987 ==
Release date	Title	Notes
January 28, 1987	Instant Justice	co-production with Mulloway Limited
February 13, 1987	Over the Top	North American distribution excluding television only; produced by the Cannon Group, Inc.
March 6, 1987	Lethal Weapon	co-production with Silver Pictures
March 20, 1987	Burglar	co-production with Nelvana Entertainment
April 3, 1987	Police Academy 4: Citizens on Patrol	—
May 22, 1987	It's Alive III: Island of the Alive	distribution only; produced by Larco Productions
June 12, 1987	The Witches of Eastwick	co-production with the Guber-Peters Company and Kennedy Miller Productions
June 26, 1987	Full Metal Jacket	co-production with Harrier Films
July 1, 1987	Innerspace	co-production with Amblin Entertainment and the Guber-Peters Company
July 24, 1987	Superman IV: The Quest for Peace (Note: Warner Bros. has since reclaimed international rights to Superman IV: The Quest for Peace from MGM)	North American distribution excluding television only; produced by the Cannon Group, Inc.
July 31, 1987	The Lost Boys	co-distributed in Spain by TriFilms and in Japan by Shochiku-Fuji
August 7, 1987	Who's That Girl	co-production with the Guber-Peters Company
August 14, 1987	Disorderlies	—
September 11, 1987	A Return to Salem's Lot	distribution only; produced by Larco Productions
September 17, 1987	A Month Later	Dutch film; international distribution only; produced by Sigma Film Productions
October 9, 1987	Surrender	North American distribution excluding television only; produced by the Cannon Group, Inc.
November 20, 1987	Nuts	co-production with Barwood Films; Nominee of the Golden Globe Award for Best Motion Picture – Drama
December 9, 1987	Empire of the Sun	co-production with Amblin Entertainment
December 18, 1987	The Rogues	Italian-Spanish film; distribution only

== 1988 ==
Release date	Title	Notes
February 26, 1988	Frantic	co-production with the Mount Company
March 4, 1988	Moving	—
March 11, 1988	Stand and Deliver	distribution only; produced by American Playhouse Theatrical Films and Eastside Productions; Inducted into the National Film Registry in 2011
March 18, 1988	Police Academy 5: Assignment Miami Beach	—
March 30, 1988	Beetlejuice	distribution only; produced by the Geffen Company
April 8, 1988	Above the Law	also known as Nico in international regions
June 3, 1988	Funny Farm	co-production with Cornelius Productions and Pan Arts, Inc.
July 8, 1988	Arthur 2: On the Rocks	—
July 13, 1988	The Dead Pool	co-production with the Malpaso Company
July 22, 1988	Caddyshack II	co-production with the Guber-Peters Company
August 10, 1988	Clean and Sober	co-production with Imagine Entertainment
August 26, 1988	Stealing Home	co-production with the Mount Company
August 26, 1988	Hot to Trot	—
September 9, 1988	Running on Empty	North and Latin American theatrical and home media distribution, U.K. and Irish theatrical distribution only; produced by Lorimar Film Entertainment and Double Play Productions
September 16, 1988	Crossing Delancey	co-production with Midwest Film Productions
September 23, 1988	Gorillas in the Mist	international distribution only; co-production with Universal Pictures and the Guber-Peters Company
September 24, 1988	Daffy Duck's Quackbusters	co-production with Warner Bros. Animation
September 30, 1988 (Note: Released in French theaters on June 1, 1988.)	Bird	co-production with Malpaso Productions
October 7, 1988	Imagine: John Lennon	co-production with the Wolper Organization and Andrew Solt Productions
October 7, 1988	Clara's Heart	co-production with MTM Enterprises
October 25, 1988	Thelonious Monk: Straight, No Chaser	co-production with Malpaso Productions, Michael Blackwood Productions and Monk Film Project; Inducted into the National Film Registry in 2017
October 28, 1988	Feds	distribution only; produced by Heathdale Productions
November 4, 1988	Everybody's All-American	co-production with New Visions Productions
November 11, 1988 (Note: Released in Australian theaters on November 3, 1988.)	A Cry in the Dark	North American distribution excluding television, Australian and New Zealand distribution only; produced by Cannon Entertainment and Cinema Verity Limited also known as Evil Angels in international regions
December 2, 1988	Tequila Sunrise	co-production with the Mount Company
December 21, 1988	Dangerous Liaisons	co-production with Lorimar Film Entertainment and NFH Limited
December 23, 1988	The Accidental Tourist	—

== 1989 ==
Release date	Title	Notes
February 3, 1989	Her Alibi	—
February 24, 1989	Bert Rigby, You're a Fool	North American theatrical and home media distribution, U.K. and Irish theatrical distribution only; produced by Lorimar Film Entertainment and Clear Productions
February 24, 1989	Powwow Highway (Note: Owned by HandMade Films, with U.S. distribution rights currently licensed to RLJE Films)	U.S. theatrical distribution only; produced by HandMade Films; Inducted into the National Film Registry in 2024
March 3, 1989	Lean on Me	—
March 9, 1989	Splendor	Italian film; International distribution outside France only; produced by Cecchi Gori Group, Studio E.L. and Gaumont
March 10, 1989	Police Academy 6: City Under Siege	—
March 24, 1989	Dead Bang	North and Latin American and Belgian theatrical and home media distribution, U.K. and Irish theatrical distribution only; produced by Lorimar Film Entertainment
April 7, 1989	Dead Calm	Australian film; distribution only; produced by Kennedy Miller Productions
April 21, 1989	See You in the Morning	North American theatrical and home media distribution, U.K. and Irish theatrical distribution only; produced by Lorimar Film Entertainment
April 21, 1989	Checking Out	U.S. theatrical distribution only; produced by HandMade Films
May 5, 1989	How to Get Ahead in Advertising	U.S. theatrical distribution only; produced by HandMade Films
May 26, 1989	Pink Cadillac	co-production with Malpaso Productions
June 23, 1989	Batman	co-production with the Guber-Peters Company and PolyGram Pictures (uncredited)
July 7, 1989	Lethal Weapon 2	co-production with Silver Pictures
August 4, 1989 (Note: Released in Australian theaters on December 15, 1988.)	Young Einstein	Australian film; distribution outside Australian and New Zealand home media and television only; co-production with Serious Productions
August 23, 1989	Cookie	distribution theatrically and on home media in North and Latin America, Sweden, Belgium, theatrically in the U.K., Ireland and West Germany only; produced by Lorimar Film Entertainment
September 15, 1989	In Country	co-production with Kingston Films
September 22, 1989	Penn & Teller Get Killed	North and Latin American theatrical and home media distribution only; produced by Lorimar Film Entertainment
October 20, 1989	Next of Kin	North and Latin American theatrical and home media distribution, U.K, Irish and West German theatrical distribution only; produced by Lorimar Film Entertainment and Barry & Enright Productions
November 3, 1989	Second Sight	distribution in North and Latin America, the U.K., Ireland, West Germany and Italy theatrically and on home media only; produced by Lorimar Film Entertainment and Ursus Film
December 1, 1989	National Lampoon's Christmas Vacation	co-production with Hughes Entertainment
December 13, 1989	Driving Miss Daisy (Note: U.K. and Irish distribution rights to Driving Miss Daisy are owned by Pathé (the successor-in-interest to international rights holder Allied Filmmakers))	North American, U.K. and Irish distribution only; produced by the Zanuck Company
December 20, 1989	Roger & Me	distribution only; produced by Dog Eat Dog Films; Inducted into the National Film Registry in 2013
December 21, 1989	The Delinquents	Australian film; international distribution outside Australian and New Zealand home media and television only; produced by Village Roadshow Pictures
December 22, 1989	Tango & Cash	co-production with the Guber-Peters Company

== See also ==
- List of New Line Cinema films
- List of films based on DC Comics publications
- List of Warner Bros. theatrical animated feature films
- Category:Lists of films by studio

== Notes ==
Release notes
