= List of Warner Bros. films (1970–1979) =

This is a list of films produced, co-produced, and/or distributed by Warner Bros.–Seven Arts and its successor Warner Bros. Pictures in the 1970s. This list does not include direct-to-video releases or films from New Line Cinema prior to its merger with Warner Bros. in 2008, nor does it include third-party films or films Warner gained the rights to as a result of mergers or acquisitions. Most films listed here were distributed theatrically overseas by Warner–Columbia Films (1971–1987; a joint venture with Columbia Pictures).

== 1970 ==
Release date	Title	Notes
January 14, 1970	Last of the Mobile Hot Shots	
February 4, 1970	Start the Revolution Without Me	co-production with Norbud Productions
February 11, 1970	Frankenstein Must Be Destroyed	British film co-production with Hammer Films
March 12, 1970	Moon Zero Two	British film
March 26, 1970	Woodstock	Inducted into the National Film Registry in 1996
May 6, 1970	The Phynx	
May 13, 1970	The Ballad of Cable Hogue	
June 7, 1970	Taste the Blood of Dracula	British film co-production with Hammer Films
July 29, 1970	Chisum	co-production with Batjac Productions
August 3, 1970	Performance	British film co-production with Goodtimes Enterprises
September 4, 1970	Which Way to the Front?	
October 20, 1970	Rabbit, Run	
October 24, 1970	Trog	British film
November 12, 1970	The Rise and Rise of Michael Rimmer	British film co-production with David Paradine Productions and London Weekend Television
November 20, 1970	Flap	co-production with Cine Vesta Associates
December 25, 1970	There Was a Crooked Man...	

== 1971 ==
Release date	Title	Notes
February 26, 1971	The Priest's Wife	Italian/French film USA distribution only
March 11, 1971	THX 1138	co-production with American Zoetrope
March 17, 1971	When Dinosaurs Ruled the Earth	British film co-production with Hammer Films
April 9, 1971	Summer of '42	co-production with Mulligan-Roth Productions
May 1, 1971	Billy Jack	distribution only; produced by National Student Film Corporation
June 17, 1971	Death in Venice	Italian film
June 24, 1971	McCabe & Mrs. Miller	Inducted into the National Film Registry in 2010
June 25, 1971	Klute	co-production with Gus Productions
July 14, 1971	Dusty and Sweets McGee	
July 16, 1971	The Devils (Note: A 4K restoration of the director's cut was issued in 2026 under the Warner Bros. Clockwork label)	British film co-production with Russo Productions
August 1, 1971	The Omega Man	co-production with Walter Seltzer Productions
August 11, 1971	And the Crows Will Dig Your Grave	Spanish film distribution only
August 25, 1971	Medicine Ball Caravan	
September 30, 1971	Skin Game	
October 6, 1971	Zeppelin	British film
November 24, 1971	Man in the Wilderness	
December 19, 1971	A Clockwork Orange	co-production with Polaris Productions and Hawk Films; Inducted into the National Film Registry in 2020
December 23, 1971	Dirty Harry	co-production with The Malpaso Company; Inducted into the National Film Registry in 2012

== 1972 ==
Release date	Title	Notes
January 13, 1972	The Cowboys	
February 2, 1972	Snow Job	
February 25, 1972	Dealing: Or the Berkeley-to-Boston Forty-Brick Lost-Bag Blues	
March 10, 1972	What's Up, Doc?	co-production with Saticoy Productions
May 24, 1972	Malcolm X	
June 12, 1972	Adam's Woman	
June 12, 1972	Get to Know Your Rabbit	
June 19, 1972	Portnoy's Complaint	co-production with Chenault Productions
June 29, 1972	The Candidate	
June 29, 1972	Come Back, Charleston Blue	
July 21, 1972	A Fan's Notes	co-production with Coquihala
July 30, 1972	Deliverance	co-production with Elmer Enterprises; Inducted into the National Film Registry in 2008
August 1, 1972	Cry for Me, Billy	distribution only; produced by Brut Productions
August 4, 1972	Super Fly	co-production with Superfly Ltd. Inducted into the National Film Registry in 2022
September 21, 1972	Cancel My Reservation (Note: Co-owned by Sony Pictures (via CPT Holdings, Inc.) and Fremantle)	US theatrical distribution only; produced by Naho Productions
September 24, 1972	The Emigrants	Swedish film distribution only; produced by Svensk Filmindustri; Nominee of the Academy Award for Best Picture
November 17, 1972	Dracula A.D. 1972	British film co-production with Hammer Film Productions
November 22, 1972	Rage	
November 29, 1972	Crescendo	British film co-production with Hammer Film Productions
December 21, 1972	Jeremiah Johnson	co-production with Sanford Productions

== 1973 ==
Release date	Title	Notes
January 31, 1973	Steelyard Blues	
February 7, 1973	The Train Robbers	co-production with Batjac Productions
March 1, 1973	The Thief Who Came to Dinner	co-production with Bud Yorkin Productions
March 21, 1973	King Boxer (Note: Owned by Celestial Pictures)	distribution only; produced by Shaw Brothers Studio
April 10, 1973	Class of '44	
April 11, 1973	Scarecrow	
June 14, 1973	The Last of Sheila	co-production with Hera Productions
June 17, 1973	Blume in Love	
June 20, 1973	O Lucky Man!	British film
July 11, 1973	Cahill U.S. Marshal	co-production with Batjac Productions
July 13, 1973	Cleopatra Jones	
July 25, 1973	The Mackintosh Man	British film co-production with Newman-Foreman Company
August 19, 1973	Enter the Dragon (Note: Rights currently shared with Fortune Star Media Limited)	distribution outside China and Hong Kong only; co-production with Concord Production Inc. and distributed with Golden Harvest; Inducted into the National Film Registry in 2004
September 7, 1973	Day for Night	French film
October 14, 1973	Mean Streets (Note: UK and Irish distribution rights currently owned by Altitude Film Distribution)	North American and select international distribution only; produced by Taplin-Perry-Scorsese Productions; Inducted into the National Film Registry in 1997
October 15, 1973	Badlands	Inducted into the National Film Registry in 1993
October 24, 1973	The All-American Boy	
October 26, 1973	The New Land	Swedish film distribution only; produced by Svensk Filmindustri
December 21, 1973	Jimi Hendrix	
December 21, 1973	The Deadly Trackers	
December 18, 1973	Amarcord (Note: Owned by Cristaldifilm, with U.S. distribution rights currently licensed to Janus Films and The Criterion Collection; Warner retains international rights)	Italian film distribution only
December 25, 1973	Magnum Force	co-production with The Malpaso Company
December 26, 1973	The Exorcist	co-production with Hoya Productions; Inducted into the National Film Registry in 2010
December 31, 1973	Treasure Island	produced by Filmation

== 1974 ==
Release date	Title	Notes
January 24, 1974	Sacred Knives of Vengeance	distribution only; produced by Shaw Brothers Studio
January 28, 1974	Black Belt Jones	co-production with Sequoin Films
February 6, 1974	McQ	co-production with Batjac Productions
February 7, 1974	Blazing Saddles	co-production with Crossbow Productions; Inducted into the National Film Registry in 2006
March 27, 1974	Mame	co-production with ABC
April 10, 1974	Our Time	
May 13, 1974	Welcome to Arrow Beach	distribution only; produced by Brut Productions
May 17, 1974	Black Eye	co-production with Pat Rooney Productions and Jerry Buss Presentations
May 19, 1974	Zandy's Bride	
June 7, 1974	Craze (Note: Owned by MGM (via Orion Pictures))	North American distribution only; produced by Harbour Productions Limited
June 19, 1974	The Terminal Man	
July 10, 1974	Oliver Twist	produced by Filmation
July 26, 1974	Uptown Saturday Night	co-production with First Artists; Inducted into the National Film Registry in 2024
August 14, 1974	Black Samson	co-production with Omni Pictures
October 1, 1974	It's Alive	co-production with Larco Productions
October 2, 1974	Hangup	distribution only; produced by Brut Productions
October 3, 1974	The Abdication	British film
November 19, 1974	Animals Are Beautiful People	South African film
December 9, 1974	Alice Doesn't Live Here Anymore	
December 14, 1974	The Towering Inferno	International distribution only; co-production with 20th Century Fox and Irwin Allen Productions
December 20, 1974	Black Christmas	USA distribution only; produced by Film Funding Ltd., Vision IV, Canadian Film Development Corporation and Famous Players
December 25, 1974	Freebie and the Bean	

== 1975 ==
Release date	Title	Notes
February 2, 1975	Rafferty and the Gold Dust Twins	
March 14, 1975	The Prisoner of Second Avenue	
March 19, 1975	The Yakuza	
May 23, 1975	Lepke	co-production with AmeriEuro Corp
June 9, 1975	Doc Savage: The Man of Bronze	
June 9, 1975	The Wicker Man (Note: Owned by StudioCanal)	USA distribution only; produced by British Lion Films
June 11, 1975	Night Moves	
June 25, 1975	The Drowning Pool	co-production with First Artists
July 11, 1975	Cleopatra Jones and the Casino of Gold	
September 21, 1975	Dog Day Afternoon	co-production with Artists Entertainment Complex; Inducted into the National Film Registry in 2009
October 10, 1975	Lisztomania	British film co-production with Goodtimes Enterprises and Visual Programme Systems
October 11, 1975	Let's Do It Again	co-production with First Artists and Verdon Productions Limited
November 1, 1975	Operation Daybreak	co-production with Howard R. Schuster, Inc., American Allied Studios and Barrandov Studios
November 2, 1975	The Ultimate Warrior	
November 7, 1975	From Beyond the Grave	British film co-production with Amicus Productions
December 18, 1975	Barry Lyndon	co-production with Hawk Films and Peregrine Productions

== 1976 ==
Release date	Title	Notes
January 1976	Inside Out	British film co-production with Kettledrum Films
February 25, 1976	Catherine & Co.	French film
April 4, 1976	Hot Potato	
April 7, 1976	Sparkle	co-production with RSO
April 9, 1976	All the President's Men	co-production with Wildwood Enterprises; Inducted into the National Film Registry in 2010
June 4, 1976	Ode to Billy Joe	
June 30, 1976	The Outlaw Josey Wales	co-production with The Malpaso Company; Inducted into the National Film Registry in 1996
July 28, 1976	The Gumball Rally	co-production with First Artists
August 12, 1976	The Ritz	
September 1, 1976	St. Ives	
October 31, 1976	The Killer Inside Me	US theatrical distribution only
October 20, 1976	Led Zeppelin: The Song Remains the Same	
December 17, 1976	A Star Is Born	co-production with First Artists and Barwood Films
December 22, 1976	The Enforcer	co-production with The Malpaso Company

== 1977 ==
Release date	Title	Notes
February 10, 1977	The Late Show	co-production with Lion's Gate Films
March 31, 1977	Brothers	co-production with Edward Lewis Productions and Soho Productions
June 13, 1977	Viva Knievel!	co-production with Sherrill C. Corwin Productions
June 17, 1977	Exorcist II: The Heretic	
July 1, 1977	Greased Lightning	
July 15, 1977	Outlaw Blues	
August 3, 1977	One on One	
September 29, 1977	Bobby Deerfield	Canadian and International distribution only; co-production with Columbia Pictures and First Artists
October 7, 1977	Oh, God!	
October 7, 1977	A Piece of the Action	co-production with First Artists
October 14, 1977	Starship Invasions	distribution only; produced by Hal Roach Studios
November 20, 1977	The Pack	
November 30, 1977	The Goodbye Girl	co-production with Metro-Goldwyn-Mayer and Rastar
December 21, 1977	The Gauntlet	co-production with The Malpaso Company

== 1978 ==
Release date	Title	Notes
January 29, 1978	A Night Full of Rain	
March 17, 1978	An Enemy of the People	
March 17, 1978	Crossed Swords	USA & Japan distribution only; produced by International Film Production and Prince and the Pauper Film Export A.G.
March 18, 1978	Straight Time	co-production with First Artists
April 14, 1978	The Medusa Touch (Note: Owned by ITV Studios)	USA distribution only; produced by ITC Entertainment
May 10, 1978	It Lives Again	co-production with Larco Productions
May 19, 1978	The Sea Gypsies	co-production with A-Team Productions
May 26, 1978	Big Wednesday	
June 2, 1978	Capricorn One	USA distribution only; produced by ITC Entertainment
July 14, 1978	The Swarm	
July 14, 1978	Hooper	
August 29, 1978	Girlfriends	distribution only; produced by Cyclops Films; Inducted into the National Film Registry in 2019
October 6, 1978	Who Is Killing the Great Chefs of Europe?	North American theatrical distribution only; produced by Lorimar, Aldrich Company, Geria Productions and Bavaria Films
October 6, 1978	Bloodbrothers	
October 27, 1978	Halloween	distribution in Germany, Austria, the Benelux, Italy and France only; produced by Compass International Pictures and Falcon International Productions
November 1, 1978	The Great Bank Hoax	
November 22, 1978	Movie Movie	USA distribution only; produced by ITC Entertainment
December 15, 1978	Superman	North American and select international distribution only; produced by Dovemead Ltd., Film Export, A.G. and International Film Production; Inducted into the National Film Registry in 2017
December 20, 1978	Every Which Way but Loose	co-production with The Malpaso Company

== 1979 ==
Release date	Title	Notes
February 9, 1979	Agatha	British film co-production with First Artists and Casablanca FilmWorks
March 23, 1979	Boulevard Nights	Inducted into the National Film Registry in 2017
April 1979	Ashanti	co-production with Columbia Pictures
April 1979	Tilt	US theatrical distribution only
April 27, 1979	A Little Romance	distribution only; produced by Orion Pictures
May 18, 1979	Over the Edge	distribution only; produced by Orion Pictures
May 25, 1979	Beyond the Poseidon Adventure	
June 15, 1979	The In-Laws	
June 22, 1979	The Main Event	co-production with First Artists and Barwood Films
July 4, 1979	The Wanderers	distribution with Orion Pictures only
July 13, 1979	The Frisco Kid	
August 17, 1979	Monty Python's Life of Brian (Note: Owned by Python (Monty) Pictures with Sony Pictures and Mercury Studios handling distribution; Mercury has licensed certain rights in North America including AVOD, SVOD, broadcast, theatrical and non-theatrical distribution to Shout! Studios)	North American distribution with Orion Pictures only; produced by Handmade Films
August 31, 1979	Time After Time	distribution only; produced by Orion Pictures
September 30, 1979	The Bugs Bunny/Road Runner Movie	produced by Warner Bros. Animation, Chuck Jones Productions and DePatie-Freleng Enterprises
October 5, 1979	10	Nominee of the Golden Globe Award for Best Motion Picture – Musical or Comedy distribution only; produced by Orion Pictures
October 19, 1979	Jesus	distribution only; produced by The Genesis Project
October 26, 1979	The Great Santini	distribution only; produced by Orion Pictures and Bing Crosby Productions
November 2, 1979	Promises in the Dark	distribution only; produced by Orion Pictures
November 8, 1979	Mad Max	international distribution outside Australia and New Zealand only; produced by Kennedy Miller Productions; distributed in North America by American International Pictures
December 1, 1979	Going in Style	

== See also ==
- List of New Line Cinema films
- List of films based on DC Comics publications
- List of Warner Bros. theatrical animated feature films
- Category:Lists of films by studio
