= The Last Photograph =

The Last Photograph may refer to:

- The Last Photograph (2017 film), a 2017 film directed by Danny Huston
- The Last Photograph (2026 film), a 2026 film directed by Zack Snyder
