= Sucker Punch (2011 film) =

American fantasy action film by Zack Snyder

- Theatrical release poster
- Directed by: Zack Snyder
- Screenplay by: Zack Snyder; Steve Shibuya
- Story by: Zack Snyder
- Produced by: Deborah Snyder; Zack Snyder
- Starring: Emily Browning; Abbie Cornish; Jena Malone; Vanessa Hudgens; Jamie Chung; Carla Gugino; Oscar Isaac; Jon Hamm; Scott Glenn
- Cinematography: Larry Fong
- Edited by: William Hoy
- Music by: Tyler Bates; Marius de Vries
- Production companies: Legendary Pictures; Cruel and Unusual Films
- Distributed by: Warner Bros. Pictures
- Release date: March 25, 2011
- Running time: 109 minutes
- Countries: United States; Canada
- Language: English
- Budget: $75-82 million
- Box office: $89.8 million

Sucker Punch is a 2011 fantasy action film directed by Zack Snyder and co-written by Snyder and Steve Shibuya. It is Snyder's first film based on an original concept. The film stars Emily Browning as "Babydoll", a young woman who is committed to a mental institution. As she collects items she needs to escape, she enters a series of fantasy worlds where she and her fellow inmates are strong, experienced warriors. Abbie Cornish, Jena Malone, Vanessa Hudgens, Jamie Chung, Carla Gugino, Oscar Isaac and Scott Glenn also star.

The film was released in both conventional and IMAX theatres in the United States on March 25, 2011. The film received generally negative reviews and underperformed at the box office, grossing $89.8 million against its $75–$82 million production budget. The film has since made a cult following after its release.

== Plot ==
Following the death of her mother, a young woman is framed for her sister's murder by their stepfather, who is infuriated after being excluded from the will, and is subsequently committed to a mental institute. Upon arrival, her stepfather bribes orderly Blue Jones to forge psychiatrist Vera Gorski's signature to have her lobotomized and she is given the nickname Babydoll.

Babydoll slips into a fantasy world in which the asylum is a brothel owned by mobster Blue and she and the other patients are sex slaves. She befriends fellow patients Amber, Blondie, Rocket, and Rocket's sister, Sweet Pea, and imagines Dr. Gorski as their dance instructor. Blue intends to sell Babydoll's virginity to the High Roller; in reality, a doctor is scheduled to perform her lobotomy. Babydoll performs an erotic dance during which she fantasizes she is in feudal Japan, meeting the Wise Man. He tells her that she needs four items to escape: a map, fire, a knife and a key. There is a fifth unrevealed item that only she can find which requires "a deep sacrifice" and will bring a "perfect victory". She fights three samurai giants, then finds herself back in the brothel.

Babydoll convinces the four other girls to join her in escaping. She dances as a distraction while the others obtain the necessary tools. During her dances, she fantasizes about adventures that mirror the escape efforts, such as infiltrating a bunker protected by World War I German soldiers to gain a map (as Sweet Pea copies a map of the building in Blue's office), storming an Orc-infested castle to retrieve fire crystals (as Amber steals a lighter from the mayor), and fighting robots on a train to disarm a bomb (as Sweet Pea steals a kitchen knife from the Cook). In the last fantasy, Rocket sacrifices herself, paralleled by the Cook fatally stabbing Rocket as she protects her sister.

Blue overhears Blondie relaying Babydoll's plan to Gorski. He fatally shoots Amber and Blondie. Babydoll stabs him with the kitchen knife and steals his master key, then starts a fire to distract the orderlies as they seek an escape. Babydoll deduces that the fifth item is her own sacrifice, and that this is Sweet Pea's story. She distracts the men long enough to allow Sweet Pea to escape.

In the asylum, the surgeon completes Babydoll's lobotomy. Gorski notes that during her short stay, Babydoll stabbed an orderly, started a fire, and helped another girl escape. The surgeon, who doesn't agree with the procedure, asks Gorski why she authorized it, and Gorski realizes that Blue has been forging her signature. The police apprehend Blue as he attempts to rape Babydoll. As he is being arrested, Blue incriminates Babydoll's stepfather.

Sweet Pea is stopped by police as she tries to board a bus, but the driver (the Wise Man) misleads the police and lets her board.

== Cast ==
- Emily Browning as Babydoll
- Abbie Cornish as Sweet Pea
- Jena Malone as Rocket
- Vanessa Hudgens as Blondie
- Jamie Chung as Amber
- Carla Gugino as Dr. Vera Gorski / Madame Vera Gorski
- Oscar Isaac as Blue Jones
- Jon Hamm as The Doctor / The High Roller
- Scott Glenn as The Wise Man / The General / The Bus Driver
- Gerard Plunkett as The Stepfather / Priest
- Patrick Sabongui as Earl
- Malcolm Scott as The Cook

== Production ==
=== Development ===
A while ago I had written a script for myself and there was a sequence in it that made me think, 'How can I make a film that can have action sequences in it that aren't limited by the physical realities that normal people are limited by, but still have the story make sense so it's not, and I don't mean to be mean, like a bullshit thing like Ultraviolet or something like that.

— Zack Snyder

Sucker Punch is described by Snyder as "Alice in Wonderland with machine guns". The film first gained attention in March 2007. Snyder put the project aside to work on Watchmen first. The film was co-written with Steve Shibuya, who authored the original script on which the story is based. Snyder directed and produced with his wife and producing partner, Deborah Snyder, through their Cruel and Unusual Films banner. Wesley Coller served as executive producer.

Warner Bros. Pictures announced in early 2009 that they would distribute Sucker Punch due to the success of Snyder's previous film, Watchmen. "They've never said, 'Ahh, it could have been shorter', or, 'Too bad it's so R-ish.' And that's really cool. I'm challenging them again with Sucker Punch." In early interviews, Snyder stated that he would make Sucker Punch an R-rated film, but a later interview stated that he was aiming for it to be rated PG-13. In its theatrical release, the movie was ultimately rated PG-13. Snyder cut many crucial scenes before the film's release in order to satisfy the MPAA's censors, but claimed that the home media release of the film will be a director's cut and closer to his original vision.

When Snyder was in San Diego hosting a Blu-ray live screening of Watchmen for San Diego Comic-Con, he handed out T-shirts for Sucker Punch featuring the first art for the film. The art was designed by Alex Pardee of Snafu Comics, with title art work by Los Angeles graffiti artist Galo Canote. Pre-production began in June 2009 in Canada. Snyder had also added that he enjoyed the freedom of filming his own original script. Photographer Clay Enos was hired to take still pictures on set and to take portraits of the main actors.

=== Casting ===
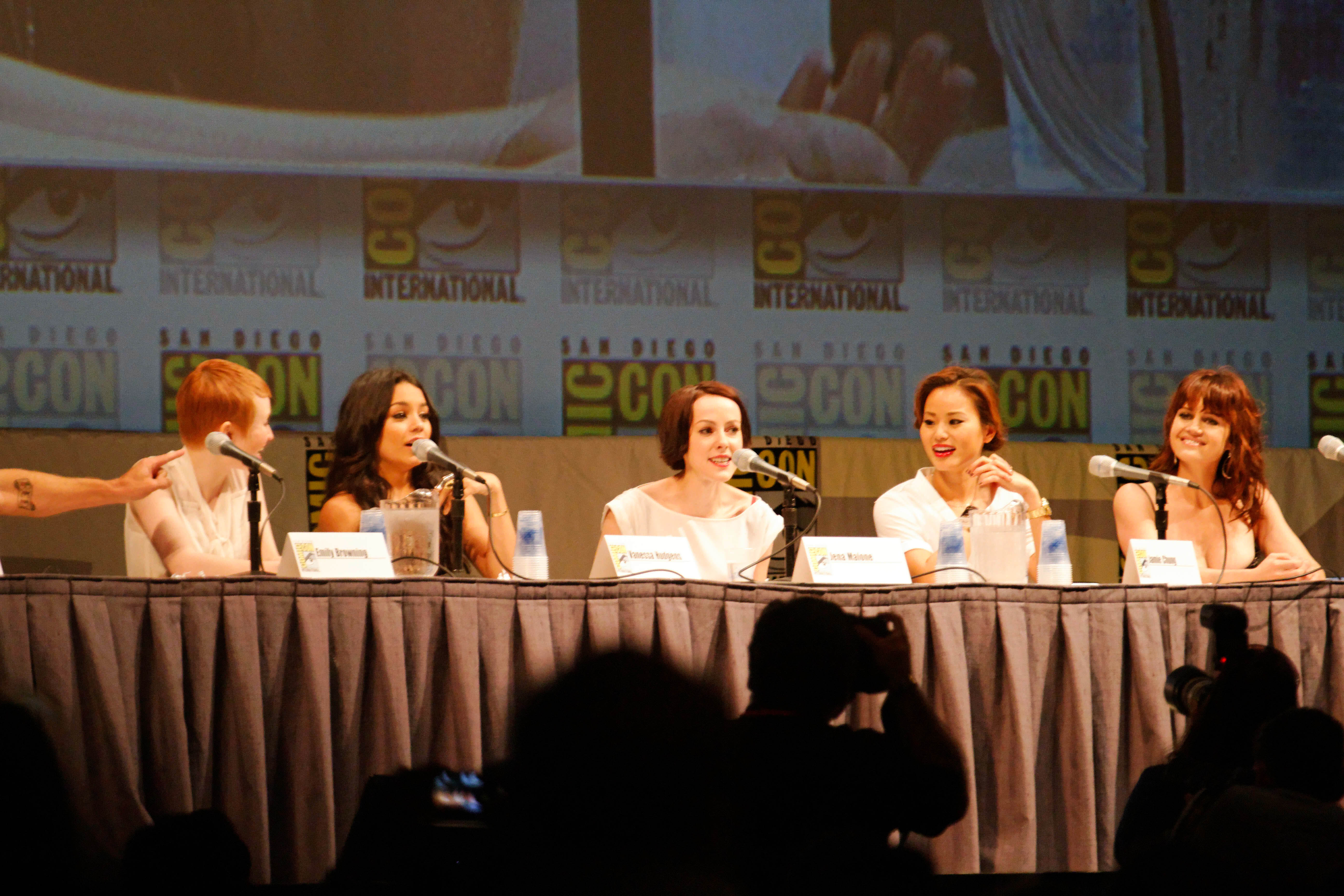
Cast of Sucker Punch at the 2010 San Diego Comic-Con

Before casting started in March 2009, Snyder revealed his ideal cast for the feature film. He chose to go with an all-female cast in this film saying that "I already did the all-male cast with 300, so I'm doing the opposite end of the spectrum."

Snyder had tapped Amanda Seyfried first for the lead role, Babydoll. When asked if Seyfried was up for the role, Snyder said, "We'll see. We're trying to, so ... She's great. It would be great if it worked out". Snyder had also offered roles to Abbie Cornish, Evan Rachel Wood, Emma Stone, and Vanessa Hudgens. However, Seyfried turned it down due to a conflict in schedule with her HBO series Big Love. Browning agreed to replace Seyfried in the role. During the confirmation of her involvement, Hudgens, Wood, Cornish, and Stone were all still in talks. According to Brie Larson in a 2020 video on YouTube, she mentioned that she auditioned for Sucker Punch.

Wood dropped out of the project due to scheduling conflicts with her recurring role in HBO's True Blood and her stage production of Spider-Man: Turn Off the Dark. She was later replaced by Malone for the role of "Rocket". Chung was signed up to play "Amber"; Emma Stone had been offered the part but declined due to a scheduling conflict with her film Easy A. Freida Pinto was also considered for the role of "Amber" before it went to Jamie Chung. Gugino, who was cast as "Madam Gorski", a psychiatrist in the asylum, previously worked with Snyder on Watchmen. Hamm was confirmed in late August 2009 to play "The High Roller". Isaac was also tapped at around the same time. Snyder confirmed that Glenn agreed to be involved in the project, portraying "The Wise Man".

=== Training ===
Prior to filming, the cast had twelve weeks of training and fight evaluations, beginning in June 2009 in Los Angeles and continuing through filming. The leads in the film were trained to deadlift up to 250 pounds (110 kg) for their roles. Damon Caro, the stunt coordinator and fight choreographer from 300 and Watchmen, Snyder's previous films, was hired for the action design, stunt training and fight choreography for the movie. The other cast members started training without Hudgens while she was involved with other projects, including Beastly. Abbie Cornish said that the rest of the cast were training six hours a day, five days a week in martial arts, swords and empty hand choreography. Jena Malone has stated that her daily routine comprised four hours of warmups and mixed martial arts wushu training, then three hours of weight training, then firearms training and tactical positioning, and then pole-dancing lessons. Snyder said that when the girls are fighting, "[like] they're on their way to kill a baby dragon, they've killed all of these orc-like creatures and they're entering a door [and] it's this classic, real Navy SEAL style room clearing. They have machine guns but they're fighting mythic creatures, impossible creatures. The hand to hand stuff is all brutal, because Damon [Caro] did all the [fights] in Bourne and it has that vibe to it." Snyder remarks that in the girls' imaginations "they can do anything".

=== Production and design ===
Pre-production began in Los Angeles in June 2009 then moved to Vancouver in July. Principal photography began in September 2009 in Vancouver, and concluded in January 2010. With an $75–82 million budget, post-production began in September 2009 and was expected to last until January 2010 in Vancouver and Toronto. Originally, production would have started in June 2009, but it was postponed. Production concluded on January 22, 2010. Snyder confirmed that prior to the set production date, he already shot some fantasy sequences for Sucker Punch. Snyder said the film is a "stylized motion picture about action and sort of landscapes of the imagination and things of that nature". Snyder had also been decided on the film's title for some time, stating it is a pop-culture reference. "It's about hopefully what the movie feels like when you watch it, more than a specific 'Oh, it's a story of this person.' It's all stylized."

The film includes an imaginary brothel that the five girls enter in the alternate reality, where singing and dancing take place. The fantasy sequences include dragons, aliens, and a World War I battle. Snyder expressed his interest in the film's content:

On the other hand, though it's fetishistic and personal, I like to think that my fetishes aren't that obscure. Who doesn't want to see girls running down the trenches of World War One wreaking havoc? I'd always had an interest in those worlds – comic books, fantasy art, animated films. I'd like to see this, that's how I approach everything, and then keep pushing it from there.

Rick Carter served as production designer while the visual effects of the film were done by Animal Logic with 75 visual effects specialists, and the Moving Picture Company (MPC) who were awarded over 120 shots. Sucker Punch operates on three levels – a reality, then a sub-reality where the psych ward world shifts into a strange high-roller's brothel. The final level is made up of a dream world where more action sequences that are removed from time and space take place. Warner Bros. announced earlier that Sucker Punch would be released in 3D format. Snyder describes the conversion into 3D as a completely different process. However, it was later announced that the film would not be presented in 3D. Snyder filmed a "Maximum Movie Mode" interactive Blu-ray commentary for the film's home media release.

Snyder wanted to design the film as something with no limits, considering that he co-wrote the script from an original idea. He added that he wanted it to "be a cool story and not just like a video game where you're just loose and going nuts." Snyder also noted the influence of Asian iconography, particularly Japanese elements such as samurai, anime, and mecha.

=== Title ===
Although the title Sucker Punch is not explained in the film, Snyder has mentioned that there are two reasonably valid ways to interpret it:

There's a mechanism in the movie that sneaks up on you. We sort of plant the seed of this thing, and then at the end of the movie it kind of comes back around. I think that in some ways, that's what the sucker punch is. But also you, the audience, have like a preconceived idea when you look at Babydoll. You think she's innocent and sweet, that she's capable of only a certain amount of things. But I think that's a mistake. So that has something to do with the title, too.

Andrew O'Hehir, writing in Salon, sees the film's title as its essential theme:

If you want to understand Snyder's central narrative gambit, it's right there in the title. He gives us what we want (or what we think we want, or what he thinks we think we want): Absurdly fetishized women in teeny little skirts, gloriously repetitious fight sequences loaded with plot coupons, pseudo-feminist fantasies of escape and revenge. Then he yanks it all back and stabs us through the eyeball.

=== Music and dance ===
The exploration of how these songs could be used to tell the story and comment on the action has been one of the more unusual and satisfactory parts of this process.

— Marius de Vries

Music plays an integral role in the film. "In the story, music is the thing that launches them into these fantasy worlds", Snyder explains. Composer Tyler Bates said that the songs "function as the subconscious mind of Babydoll and her journey", and musical producer Marius de Vries considered it "an important task of the songs to signplace which particular world you are inhabiting at a particular moment". They used pre-existing songs for Sucker Punch, covering them in a way that would create suitable moods. Music thus becomes the backbone of the film and is used as it was in Moulin Rouge!, according to Snyder. Dance choreography was spearheaded by Paul Becker. Emily Browning did the vocals for the songs Sweet Dreams, Asleep and Where Is My Mind that are played during the movie. Carla Gugino had to take singing lessons for her scenes as a choreographer madam in the brothel. The brothel scenario has "sexy" songs, as Jamie Chung described, and dance fantasy scenes. Due to time constraints, Snyder was forced to cut most of the dance sequences for the theatrical release of the film, but there is one during the credits. He did mention that for the home media release of the film's "director's cut", the dance scenes will be re-inserted.

In September 2009, Chung reported that they had begun recording tracks for Sucker Punch. Oscar Isaac said the songs used in the film are not original, but are new arrangements of existing music.

Tyler Bates (who composed all of Snyder's previous live-action films) and Marius de Vries (who composed the score for the film Moulin Rouge!) co-wrote the film score. The official trailers contain samples from the songs "Prologue" by Immediate Music, "Crablouse" by Lords of Acid, "When the Levee Breaks" by Led Zeppelin, "Tomorrow Never Knows" by The Beatles, "And Your World Will Burn" by Cliff Lin, "Panic Switch" by the Silversun Pickups, and "Illusion of Love" (Fred Falke remix) by Uffie.

Sucker Punch: Original Motion Picture Soundtrack was released on March 22, 2011 by WaterTower Music. It contained nine tracks, all covers, remixes, and mash-ups (as the label website says, "wildly re-imagined versions of classic songs") of tracks by Alison Mosshart, Björk, Queen, and performances from stars Emily Browning, Carla Gugino, and Oscar Isaac. The album was praised by music and film critics, as were Browning's vocals.

== Release ==
=== Marketing ===
Sucker Punch participated in the 2010 Comic-Con and showed the first footage of the film, featuring the songs "Prologue" by Immediate Music and "The Crablouse" by Lords of Acid. The trailer was released on July 27 on Apple Trailers. The second official trailer was released on November 3 and was attached to Due Date, Harry Potter and the Deathly Hallows – Part 1, and Black Swan. On February 15, Titan Books released the official Art of the Film book full of pictures, to mark the film's release in the following month.

The film received a PG-13 rating. To avoid an R rating, a scene that implied sex was cut. Browning said, "I had a very tame and mild love scene with John [sic] Hamm ... I think it's great for this young girl to actually take control of her own sexuality. Well, the MPAA doesn't like that. They don't think a girl should ever be in control of her own sexuality because they're from the Stone Age... they got Zack to edit the scene and make it look less like she's into it. And Zack said he edited it down to the point where it looked like he was taking advantage of her. That's the only way he could get a PG-13 [rating] and he said, 'I don't want to send that message.' So they cut the scene!"

In the United Kingdom, the film received a 12A certificate for "moderate violence, threat, language and sexual references". The film was passed with no additional cuts required. The extended cut was given a 12.

=== Home media ===
Sucker Punch was released on DVD and in a Blu-ray combo pack on June 28, 2011. The film reached #1 best-selling DVD for four weeks in a row, selling over a million copies in America on its premiere day. An R-rated extended cut was included on the Blu-ray release, which adds 18 minutes to the film. The bonus features include four animated shorts based on the four fantasy scenarios.

=== Unreleased director's cut ===
Snyder has stated that the extended cut of Sucker Punch is not his desired version of the film, but complications over film rights make it uncertain as to whether or not his director's cut could ever be released. He still plans to release it as of 2024.

== Reception ==
=== Box office ===
Sucker Punch grossed $19 million in its first weekend, an opening that placed it second behind Diary of a Wimpy Kid: Rodrick Rules. It also opened in 23 markets that weekend, standing at sixth in the overseas box office with $6.5 million. The following weekend, it dropped to seventh place in North America with $6 million, but fared better internationally, where an expansion to 16 more countries led to a $11.5 million gross which topped the international ranking. Sucker Punch grossed $36.4 million domestically and $53.4 million in other territories, for a worldwide total of $89.8 million.

=== Critical response ===
On review aggregation website Rotten Tomatoes 22% of 220 critics have given Sucker Punch a positive review, with an average rating of 4.1/10. The site's critics consensus reads: "It's technically impressive and loaded with eye-catching images, but without characters or a plot to support them, all of Sucker Punch's visual thrills are for naught." Metacritic assigned the film a weighted average score of 33 out of 100, based on 29 critics, indicating "generally unfavorable reviews". Audiences polled by CinemaScore gave the film an average grade of "B−" on an A+ to F scale.

Although Snyder had claimed that he wanted the film to "be a cool story and not just like a video game where you're just loose and going nuts", some critics compared the film unfavorably to a video game in their reviews. Richard Roeper gave the film a D, saying that it "proves a movie can be loud, action-packed and filled with beautiful young women – and still bore you to tears." The Orlando Sentinel gave the movie one out of four stars calling it "an unerotic unthrilling erotic thriller in the video game mold". The A.V. Club's Nathan Rabin wrote, "with its quests to retrieve magical totems, clearly demarcated levels, and non-stop action, Snyder's clattering concoction sometimes feels less like a movie than an extended, elaborate trailer for its redundant videogame adaptation." Reviewing it for The Sydney Morning Herald, Giles Hardie called the film "incredibly ambitious", and explained that while "traditional depths of character development and motivation are sidelined, [...] this is intentional, allowing the audience to immerse in the layers of dreams and later piece together what actually happened".

Roger Ebert wrote: "'Sucker Punch' is so bad when the lobotomist turned up Peter Sobczynski wanted to scream 'I'll have what she's having!'" British film critic Mark Kermode described the film as "the most boring, ploddingly put together, infantile, crass, adolescent, stupid, chauvinistic twaddle that I've sat through in a very, very long time." Filmmaker Quentin Tarantino named it one of the worst movies of 2011, as did Owen Nicholls of NME.

Legendary Pictures reportedly attributed the movie's failure to become a box office hit to movie audiences not accepting a female action hero.

Not all reviews were negative. Keith Uhlich of Time Out New York named Sucker Punch the tenth-best title of 2011: "This excessive digi-satire spits in the face of fanboys-'n'-their-franchises." Sonny Bunch hailed the movie as an "exciting, entertaining piece of work, one that subverts your expectations even as it plays to your presumptions." In a 2018 article for Oscilloscope Laboratories, Sheila O'Malley wrote favorably of Sucker Punch and described its similarities with the Depression-era musical Gold Diggers of 1933. Over time, the film has gained a cult following.

=== Depiction of women ===
==== Criticisms ====
Sucker Punch also drew criticism for its depiction of women. Several critics described the film as misogynistic and others expressed concern over its treatment of sexual violence. Monika Bartyzel of Moviefone wrote: "The women of Zack Snyder's Sucker Punch are not empowered. Though they are given vicious snarls, swords and guns, the leading ladies of Snyder's latest are nothing more than cinematic figures of enslavement given only the most minimal fight. Their rebellion is one of imaginative whimsy in a heavily misogynistic world that is barely questioned or truly challenged." Michael Phillips of The Chicago Tribune stated that "Zack Snyder must have known in preproduction that his greasy collection of near-rape fantasies and violent revenge scenarios disguised as a female-empowerment fairy tale wasn't going to satisfy anyone but himself."

St. Petersburg Times critic Steve Persall found that the most offensive fact about the film was that it "suggests that all this objectification of women makes them stronger. It's supposed to be reassuring that men who beat, berate, molest and kill these women will get what's coming to them. Just wait, Snyder says, but in the meantime here's another femininity insult to keep you occupied." A.O. Scott of The New York Times described the film as a "fantasia of misogyny" that pretends to be a "feminist fable of empowerment" and found that the film's treatment of sexual violence was problematic and believes the target audience as a whole is in favor of it. Peter Debruge of Variety argued that the film is "misleadingly positioned as female empowerment despite clearly having been hatched as fantasy fodder for 13-year-old guys" and that the fact that the young women in the movie are "under constant threat of being raped or murdered" makes the film "highly inappropriate for young viewers."

Betsy Sharkey of The Los Angeles Times suggested that the film neither objectifies nor empowers women, and is instead a "wonderfully wild provocation – an imperfect, overlong, intemperate and utterly absorbing romp through the id that I wouldn't have missed for the world." In a retrospective article about the critical reception of Sucker Punch, James MacDowell questioned the alleged misogyny of the film, arguing that it does not in fact aim to offer female empowerment, but is instead "a deeply pessimistic analysis of female oppression", because it makes clear that, "just as men organize the dances, so do they control the terms of the fight scenes; in neither do the women have true agency, only an illusion of it."

Writing in a separate piece for The A.V. Club months after giving the film a "C−" grade, Nathan Rabin concluded, "Depending on whom you ask, Snyder set out to make either the ultimate sexist masturbatory fanboy fantasy or the ultimate critique of sexist masturbatory fanboy fantasies. He failed spectacularly on both counts, but in true Fiasco form, there's something fascinating and even strangely majestic about that failure."

Scott Mendelsohn of The Huffington Post called the film a "bitterly sad and angrily feminist mini-epic", and said that while it presents scenes of "matter-of-fact lechery from men towards women that is an accepted norm in our society, both then and now", it "earns kudos for daring to actually be about something relevant and interesting. It is actually very much about the sexualization of women in popular culture, rather than just using those tools to make pointless exploitation fare." Patrick Bromley of DVD Verdict posited that Sucker Punch uses the "prism of popular culture to say something about the roles that women find themselves forced into—and not just in the fantasies of geeks and fanboys". Bromley further judged that the film is "about fighting a losing battle. About using every tool at your disposal, be it sexuality or physical strength or wit or the ability to band together to fight a common enemy—the tool of Sisterhood—and about how that still isn't enough."

In retrospect, Snyder said: "I'm always shocked that it was so badly misunderstood. I always said that it was a commentary on sexism and geek culture. Someone would ask me, 'Why did you film the girls this way?' And I'd say, 'Well you did!' Sucker Punch is a fuck you to a lot of people who will watch it." Double Toasted criticized this statement in a retrospective review, adding they felt the film had not aged well in recent years.

==== Statements of the cast ====
Emily Browning highly praised the film and Snyder's vision, crediting the experience with rekindling her love for acting at a point where she was entertaining to retire. She stated, "I used to play with guns with my brothers and play catch the flag and go paintballing... so, this is totally a girl fantasy to me. And the fact that we're wearing awesome outfits at the same time just makes it like ideal girl superhero." When faced against the accusations that the films was sexist or objectification, Browning found them "bizarre" and stated critics had missed that the film revolted against these concepts. She described the movie as young women fighting for agency and survival. Browning also described her character as taking control of her own sexuality and stopping being used by her stepfather, and criticized MPAA's decision to change her love scene to an implied rape.

Abbie Cornish described her experience in the film as "a different mentality about our bodies as women" through her weapons training. She explicitly praised Snyder's way to understand feminity and denied accusations of him being a "macho dude director". She believed the film represented freedom and survival in hostile environments.

Jena Malone was heavily involved with the movie, which she described as one of the best film experiences in her life: "I had just never been asked to do so many cool things and then also have the belief instilled in me that I could do those things". She also joked that character's fighting attire was not revealing enough compared to her costars. At the same, she defended Snyder's vision of female struggle, stating: "if we read the script and it felt like he didn’t know what he was talking about I don’t think any of us would be here. But the script itself explores so many levels of female archetypes and allowing them to break and bend and expose themselves. Allowing women to be these really fully fleshed characters. I was thinking about it – they could be men or women. Literally we could almost be sexless if it wasn’t for the specificity of the world we’re in.

Vanessa Hudgens also praised her experience in the film. She described it as doing things she had never believed she could do. Hudgens was highly supportive of the portrayal of women in the movie, which she considered "true woman empowerment", and cited Angelina Jolie's roles as an inspiration for young women like them. Against criticism that their characters' attires being too revealing, she stated she had no trouble wearing it, citing that "a woman's body is something beautiful" and that she wanted to show hers after having got in the best shape of her life for the role.

Jamie Chung similarly spoke positively of the film, stating, "you’re putting on these beautiful costumes so can’t help but feel a different kind of confidence." In 2023, she cited Sucker Punch as the first of her favourite roles in her career.

=== Accolades ===
Though the film's content was derided, the film received some recognition for the visual effects of the fantasy sequences. Sucker Punch received a nomination at the 2011 Scream Awards for Best F/X, and its stunt work was nominated for a Taurus Award. The film was also pre-nominated for the Academy Award for Best Visual Effects.
