= Xerxes (graphic novel) =

2018 comic-book limited series by Frank Miller

Xerxes: The Fall of the House of Darius and the Rise of Alexander

Publication information
- Publisher: Dark Horse Comics
- Schedule: Monthly
- Format: Limited series
- Publication date: April 4 – August 1, 2018
- No. of issues: 5

Creative team
- Written by: Frank Miller
- Artist: Frank Miller
- Colorist: Alex Sinclair
- Editor: Freddye Miller

Xerxes: The Fall of the House of Darius and the Rise of Alexander, or simply Xerxes, is a 2018 comic book limited series written and illustrated by Frank Miller. Acting as both a prequel and sequel to the events chronicled in Miller's earlier series 300, a fictional retelling of the Battle of Thermopylae, the series garnered a mixed reception.

Parts of the series were loosely adapted for the 2014 film 300: Rise of an Empire, a sequel to the 2006 film adaptation of 300. However, the comic series was not actually published until 2018, four years after the film's release. A further film adaptation of Xerxes' Rise of Alexander segments, Blood and Ashes, is also in development.

== Synopsis ==
=== Chapter One ===
In 490 BC, Darius I invades mainland Greece in retaliation for the Ionian Revolt's destruction of Sardis, with Athens's aid. An advance scouting party is slaughtered by a small detachment of Athenians, led by Themistokles and Aeskylos. The following day, at Marathon, General Miltiades comes up with a radical strategy to abandon the traditional phalanx and charge the numerically superior Persian force with a battle line that has been deliberately thinned in order to allow the Greeks to flank the Persians and catch them in a pincer. The strategy works, and the Persian force is slaughtered, but Miltiades orders the army to return to Athens immediately, knowing that the main body of Darius' force is headed there by sea.

=== Chapter Two ===
The army returns to Athens ahead of the Persians, but Militades sees they are hopelessly outnumbered, and begs to be killed for his failure. Themistokles, however, has a plan: all the citizens of Athens, including women and the elderly, are dressed in armor and arrayed on the shore, presenting the image of a mighty army. Darius balks from landing, and decides to send a detachment of Androsians to test the Athenians. The Androsians' barges are destroyed by arrows lit with Greek fire, which acts as a diversion for Aeskylos to swim between the Persian ships, mount a cliff above Darius' flagship, and rain javelins onto the deck, killing Darius and several of his Immortals. Darius dies in his son Xerxes's arms, warning his son not to repeat his mistake, and to leave the Greeks in peace. The Persian navy retreats, but Themistokles feels no sense of triumph, believing that Xerxes's survival will come back to haunt them.

=== Chapter Three ===
In 479 BC, Xerxes journeys into the desert of Najd, communing with the spirits of his ancestors and emerging as a mighty god-king. Returning to his capital, he demands that the "perfect" woman be found to be his wife, and he finds her in Esther of Judea, who promises all her love to the king if he will free her people. There is ambiguity as to what happens next: Xerxes either orders Zion burned to ash, "freeing" the Jewish people to wander homeless, or else he halts the campaign of genocide commenced by his father and saves the Jews from annihilation, who declare a national holiday (Purim) in his honor.

After his ignominious defeat in Greece, Xerxes returns to Persia, but his plans for his empire are cut short by his assassination in 465 BC. Again, there is ambiguity about the exact manner of his assassination: whether he was struck down in battle, or quietly poisoned.

=== Chapter Four ===
336 BC: under Darius III, the Persian Empire is larger and mightier than ever before. But Alexander the Great conquers all of Greece and invades Persia, defeating Darius' army at Issus in 333 BC. Darius flees the battle and his wife and children are taken hostage by Alexander, who orders their lives spared.

=== Chapter Five ===
331 BC: Incensed by Alexander's refusal to return his wife and family, Darius confronts the Greeks again, at Gaugamela. Again, the Persians are defeated and Darius flees to Babylon, while the Greeks sack Susa and Persepolis. Darius is finally assassinated in 330 BC by his cousin Bessus. Alexander himself oversees Darius' funeral, saluting him as a worthy rival, while anticipating his own plans to conquer the entire known world, believing that nothing is impossible.

== Film adaptations ==
=== 300: Rise of an Empire ===
In June 2008, producers Mark Canton, Gianni Nunnari, and Bernie Goldmann revealed that work had begun on a sequel to the 2006 film 300. Based on the then-unpublished Xerxes, the film 300: Rise of an Empire, directed by Noam Murro, was released on March 7, 2014.

=== Blood and Ashes ===
In May 2021, 300 director Zack Snyder revealed that, during COVID-19 lockdown, he had written a third 300 film subtitled Blood and Ashes, adapting the Alexander the Great segments of Xerxes, but Warner Bros. Pictures was not interested in it. In December 2023, Snyder revealed that he had regained the rights for Blood and Ashes from Warner Bros., and was planning to develop the film in the future.
