= Karen Alexander (fashion model) =

American model

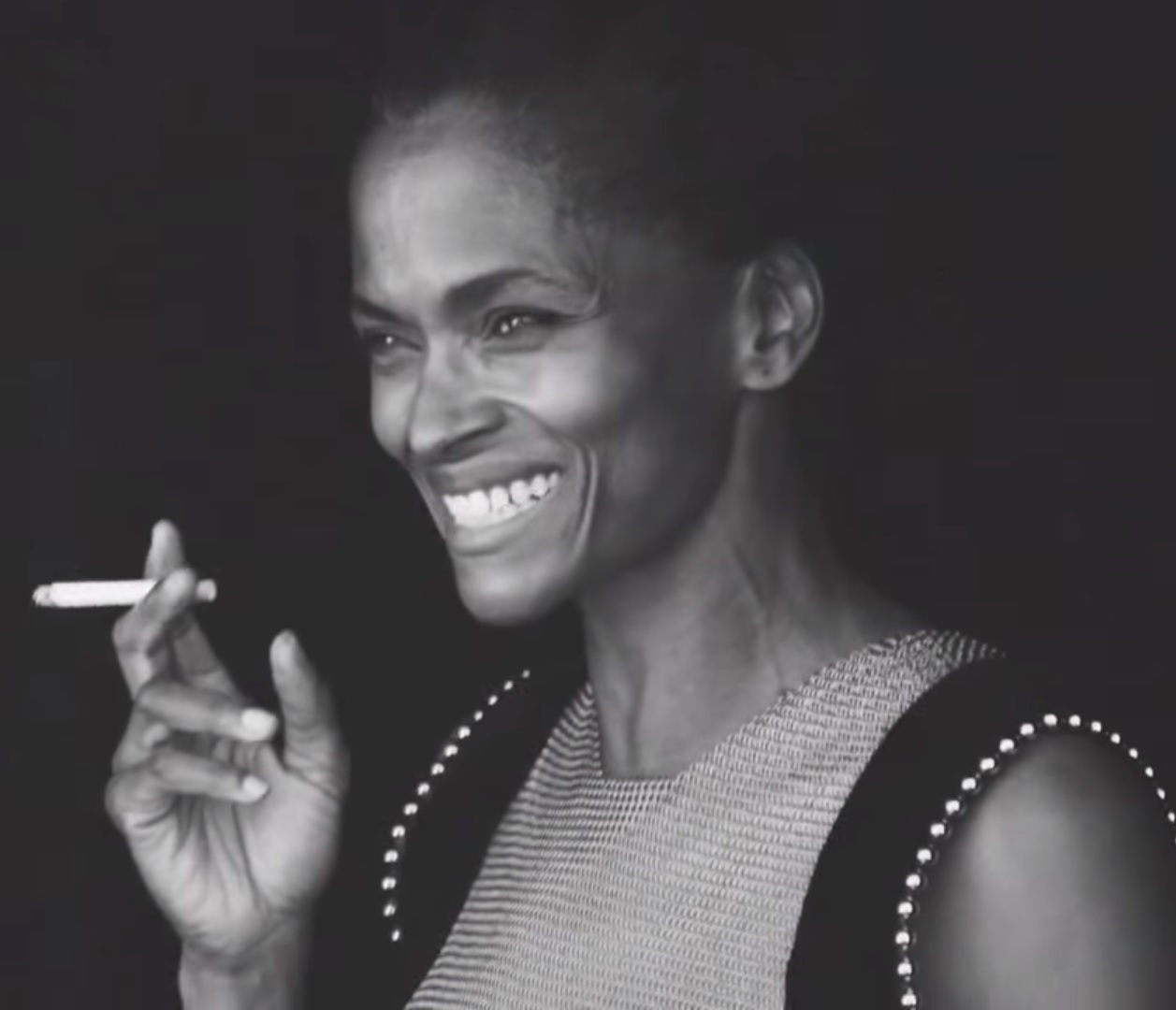
- Alexander in 2015
- Born: 1965 (age 60–61); New Jersey, U.S.
- Citizenship: United States
- Occupation: Model
- Years active: 1982–present
- Known for: Bad Boys, Elle Magazine, Vogue
- Spouse: Kurt Olaf Johnstad
- Children: 3
- Modeling information
- Height: 5 ft 10 in (178 cm)
- Hair color: Brown
- Eye color: Brown

Karen Patton Alexander (born circa 1965 in New Jersey) is an American fashion model. Alexander worked with many of fashion's top designers and magazine editors in a career that spanned over two decades.

== Career ==
Alexander began her career when she was sixteen years old, after visiting multiple modeling agencies in New York. She tried to sign with Eileen Ford, John Casablancas, and Bethann Hardison, but was seen as "unphotogenic," not "commercial" enough, or too "commercial" by each of them respectively. She eventually signed with Legends Agency.

Alexander is most known for her modeling during the late eighties and early nineties. During her career, she was featured on the covers of Vogue, Harpers Bazaar, Elle, Mademoiselle, Glamour, and Mirabella and worked on campaigns for Cover Girl, Tiffany & Co, and Chanel's Allure. She also worked with the top photographers of her time such as Steven Meisel, Patrick Demarchelier, Gilles Bensimon, and Peter Lindbergh. Alexander reached the peak of her career when she was featured in the 1988 and 1989 Sports Illustrated Swimsuit Issues and in Herb Ritts' Pirelli Calendar. She was then featured in People magazine's "50 Most Beautiful People." Despite her success, she told People that she had never felt she was pretty until she was pregnant. In the 1990 interview, she told them, "Until I was pregnant I felt like an impostor waiting to be found out."

Although she is known to have broken barriers for models of color, being one of the first to be featured in a Sports Illustrated swimsuit edition, she has been the victim of racism throughout her career. She told Vogue during an interview in 1991, "I really don't have the same modeling options of, say, Cindy Crawford or Christy Turlington - although I don't mean to single them out. My agency will say, 'Oh, they aren't using a black girl.'"

As an actress, Alexander is most known for her appearance in the 1995 film Bad Boys.

In 2016, Alexander signed with IMG Models and fronted a L’Oréal campaign.

== Personal life ==
Alexander was previously married to producer Adam Kidron, with whom she has two daughters. She is now married to American screenwriter Kurt Olaf Johnstad, and has three daughters. Alexander is a member of a group that works to end gun violence.

== See also ==
- IMG Models
