= 300: Rise of an Empire =

2014 American film by Noam Murro

- Theatrical release poster
- Directed by: Noam Murro
- Screenplay by: Zack Snyder; Kurt Johnstad
- Based on: Xerxes (Note: Unpublished at the time of the release of the film.) by Frank Miller
- Produced by: Gianni Nunnari; Mark Canton; Zack Snyder; Deborah Snyder; Bernie Goldmann
- Starring: Sullivan Stapleton; Eva Green; Lena Headey; Hans Matheson; Rodrigo Santoro; Yigal Naor
- Cinematography: Simon Duggan
- Edited by: Wyatt Smith; David Brenner
- Music by: Junkie XL
- Production companies: Warner Bros. Pictures; Legendary Pictures; Cruel and Unusual Films; Atmosphere Entertainment; Hollywood Gang Productions
- Distributed by: Warner Bros. Pictures
- Release dates: March 4, 2014 (TCL Chinese Theatre); March 7, 2014 (United States)
- Running time: 102 minutes
- Country: United States
- Language: English
- Budget: $110 million
- Box office: $337.6 million

300: Rise of an Empire is a 2014 American epic historical action film directed by Noam Murro from a screenplay by Zack Snyder and Kurt Johnstad, based on the comic book limited series Xerxes by Frank Miller. A sequel to 300 (2006), it takes place before, during, and after the main events of that film, and is a fictionalized retelling of the Battle of Artemisium and the Battle of Salamis in the Greco-Persian Wars. The cast includes Lena Headey, Peter Mensah, David Wenham, Andrew Tiernan, Andrew Pleavin, and Rodrigo Santoro reprising their roles from the first film, alongside Sullivan Stapleton, Eva Green, Hans Matheson, and Callan Mulvey.

300: Rise of an Empire was released theatrically on March 7, 2014, by Warner Bros. Pictures. It received mixed reviews, with critics praising the action sequences, music, cinematography, visual effects and Green's performance but criticizing the story, Stapleton's performance, and overstylized gore. The film was a box-office success, grossing $337 million worldwide from a $110 million budget.

== Plot ==
Queen Gorgo of Sparta narrates about the Battle of Marathon, in which King Darius of Persia was killed by Themistocles of Athens. Darius's son, Xerxes, witnesses his father's death and is advised to never wage war against the Greeks. Darius's naval commander, Artemisia, persuades Xerxes to become a god and sends him on a journey through the desert. Xerxes reaches a cave and bathes in an otherworldly liquid, emerging as a "God-King". He returns to Persia and declares war on Greece to avenge his father.

As Xerxes' forces advance towards Thermopylae, Themistocles meets with the council and convinces them to provide him with a fleet to engage the Persians at sea. Themistocles travels to Sparta to ask King Leonidas for help but is informed by Dilios that Leonidas is consulting the Oracle, and Gorgo is reluctant to side with Athens. Themistocles reunites with his old friend Scyllias, who infiltrated the Persian troops, and reveals Artemisia was born Greek but defected to Persia after her family was murdered by Greek hoplites. A Persian emissary took her in and trained her, and she eventually rose to become a naval commander. Themistocles also learns that Leonidas has marched to fight the Persians with only 300 men.

Themistocles leads his fleet of fifty warships and several thousand men, which include Scyllias, Scyllias's son Calisto, and Themistocles' right-hand man Aeschylus to the Aegean Sea, starting the Battle of Artemisium. They ram their ships into the Persian ships and attack them before retreating. The following day, the Greeks feign a retreat and lead the Persian ships into a crevice, where they become stuck. The Greeks attack the Persian ships from the cliffs above. Impressed with Themistocles, Artemisia brings him onto her ship and attempts to seduce him to rally the Persian side as her second-in-command, but he refuses her offer.

The Persians attack the Greek ships with tar and flame bombs, but an Athenian kills one of the Persians, who falls into the tar carrying a torch, damaging ships from both sides. Themistocles is thrown into the sea by an explosive carried onboard by a Persian swimmer, nearly drowns before being rescued by Aeschylus, and is by Scyllias's side as he succumbs to his arrow injuries inflicted by Artemisia in echo of King Darius's death. Believing Themistocles to be dead, Artemisia and her forces withdraw. After recovering from his injuries, Themistocles learns that only a few hundred of his warriors and six of his ships survived the disastrous attack.

Daxos, an Arcadian general, tells Themistocles that Leonidas and his 300 men were killed after Ephialtes betrayed the Greeks to Xerxes. Themistocles returns to Athens and confronts Ephialtes, who reveals that Xerxes plans to attack and burn Athens. Ephialtes regrets his betrayal and welcomes death but is spared so he can warn Xerxes that the Greek forces are gathering at Salamis. Themistocles visits Gorgo in Sparta to ask for help, but Gorgo, mourning Leonidas's death, refuses. Before departing, Themistocles urges Gorgo to avenge Leonidas.

In Athens, Xerxes' army is laying waste when Ephialtes arrives to deliver Themistocles' message. Upon learning he is alive, Artemisia leaves to ready her navy for battle. Themistocles inspires all of his remaining forces to continue fighting. The remaining Greek ships charge into the Persian ships, beginning the decisive Battle of Salamis. Themistocles and Artemisia engage in a duel, which ends in a stalemate.

Gorgo arrives at the battle along with ships from numerous Greek city-states including Delphi, Thebes, Olympia, Arcadia, and Sparta, all united against the Persians. Xerxes, watching the battle from a cliff, turns back, acknowledging his naval defeat and continuing the march of his army. Artemisia attacks Themistocles, but he stabs and kills her. Accompanied by Dilios, Themistocles and Gorgo lead the entire Greek army against the Persians.

== Cast ==
- Sullivan Stapleton as Themistocles
- Eva Green as Artemisia
  - Caitlin Carmichael as 8-year-old Artemisia
  - Jade Chynoweth as 13-year-old Artemisia
- Lena Headey as Queen Gorgo
- Rodrigo Santoro as King Xerxes
- Jack O'Connell as Calisto
- Hans Matheson as Aeschylus
- Callan Mulvey as Scyllias
- David Wenham as Dilios
- Andrew Tiernan as Ephialtes
- Yigal Naor as King Darius I
- Andrew Pleavin as Daxos
- Ben Turner as General Artaphernes
- Ashraf Barhom as General Bandari
- Christopher Sciueref as General Kashani
- Peter Mensah as Artemisia's trainer / Persian messenger
- Gerard Butler as King Leonidas (archive footage)
  - Additionally, a computer-generated facsimile is used to represent Leonidas in a separate scene.
- Michael Fassbender as Stelios (archive footage)

== Production ==
=== Development ===
In June 2008, producers Gianni Nunnari, Mark Canton, and Bernie Goldmann revealed that work had begun on a sequel to 300. Legendary Pictures announced that Frank Miller, who wrote the 1998 comic book limited series on which the film 300 was based, was writing a follow-up graphic novel, and Zack Snyder, co-screenwriter and director of 300, was interested in directing the adaptation, but instead chose to develop and direct the Superman reboot Man of Steel. Noam Murro directed instead, while Snyder produced and co-wrote. The film was centered on the Greek leader Themistocles, portrayed by Australian actor Sullivan Stapleton. During pre-production, the film was titled 300: Battle of Artemisium (although this was widely misreported as "Battle of Artemisia"); the film was retitled 300: Rise of an Empire in September 2012.

=== Filming ===
Principal photography commenced in early July 2012 at the Nu Boyana Film Studios in Sofia, Bulgaria. Underwater greenscreen scenes were also filmed at Leavesden Studios. On May 10, 2013, it was announced the film's release date would be pushed back from August 2, 2013, to March 7, 2014.

=== Music ===
The film's score was composed by Junkie XL, being the first film in an ongoing partnership with Snyder. He attempted to research on the ancient Persian and Greek music instrumentation to match the time period and culture, while also being a fantasy film, he tried to blend the sounds with electronic instruments here and there. The album featuring Junkie XL's score was released by WaterTower Music on March 4, 2014.

== Reception ==
=== Box office ===
300: Rise of an Empire grossed $106.6 million in North America and $231 million in other territories for a worldwide total of $337.6 million, against a production budget of $110 million.

In North America, the film opened at number one in its first weekend with $45 million. In its second weekend, the film dropped to number two, grossing an additional $19.2 million. In its third weekend, the film dropped to number five, grossing $8.5 million. In its fourth weekend, the film dropped to number nine, grossing $4.2 million.

=== Critical response ===
Review aggregation website Rotten Tomatoes gives the film an approval rating of 45% based on 197 reviews, with an average rating of 5/10. The site's critical consensus reads, "It's bound to hit some viewers as an empty exercise in stylish gore, and despite a gonzo starring performance from Eva Green, 300: Rise of an Empire is a step down from its predecessor." On Metacritic, the film has a score of 48 out of 100 score, based on 34 critics, indicating "mixed or average" reviews. Audiences polled by CinemaScore gave the film an average grade of "B" on an A+ to F scale, down from the A− received by its predecessor.

Several critics compared the film negatively to its predecessor. Todd Gilchrist of The Wrap wrote: "Rise of an Empire lacks director Snyder's shrewd deconstruction of cartoonish hagiography, undermining the glorious, robust escapism of testosterone-fueled historical reenactment with an underdog story that's almost too reflective to be rousing." Nicolas Rapold of The New York Times gave a mixed review: "The naval collisions and melees play out in panel-like renderings that are bold and satisfying for the first half-hour but lack the momentum and bombastic je ne sais quoi of 300." Todd McCarthy of The Hollywood Reporter thought it was "more monochromatic and duller in appearance, lacking the bold reds and rich earth tones" of the earlier film. Scott Foundas of Variety gave a positive review: "This highly entertaining time-filler lacks the mythic resonances that made 300 feel like an instant classic, but works surprisingly well on its own terms." Soren Anderson of The Seattle Times thought it "very impressive in its single-minded dedication to creating a moviegoing experience designed to totally engulf its audience". James Rocchi of Film.com gave the film a zero out of ten and called it "a 3D joke".

James Berardinelli wrote, "The movie delivers all the necessary elements but their impact is dull." Joe Neumaier of the New York Daily News thought it looked "like an ashen video game. It's even more muddy in IMAX and 3-D." Colin Covert of the Star Tribune felt it "plays like a collaboration between the Marquis de Sade and Michael Bay. Or maybe the History Channel and the Saw franchise." Guy Lodge of Time Out wrote, "It's flesh and carnage that the audience is here to see, and Murro delivers it by the glistening ton, pausing only for stray bits of backstory." Ann Hornaday of The Washington Post said, "Rise of an Empire is no fun at all – even those famous six-pack abs from 300 seem to be missing a can or two." In a negative review, Drew Hunt of the Chicago Reader wrote: "The slow-motion battle scenes are technically impressive and occasionally elegant, but there's enough machismo here to choke a thousand NFL locker rooms." Richard Roeper called the film "A triumph of production design, costumes, brilliantly choreographed battle sequences and stunning CGI".

Scott Bowles of USA Today gave the film two out of four stars: "For anyone looking for a sense of script (forget plausibility), Empire is a Trojan horse." Betsy Sharkey of the Los Angeles Times thought, "The spectacularly brutal fighting is the film's main calling card, and in that Rise of an Empire doesn't disappoint." David Hiltbrand of The Philadelphia Inquirer praised "its slo-mo ultraviolence" and "impressive 3-D effects", calling it "a fan boy's fantasy, a four-star wonderment". Tom Long of The Detroit News gave the film a D, "a bloodbath and not much else". Adam Nayman of The Globe and Mail called it "an add-on content pack for a video game". Mark Jenkins of NPR gave the film a negative review, saying, "If the movie's action recalls video games, the dramatically artificial lighting suggests 1980s rock videos. Indeed, Rise of an Empire is so campy that it might work better as a musical." Stephen Whitty of the Newark Star-Ledger gave the film one and a half stars out of four, saying, "There is much grinding of teeth, and mauling of history, and anachronistic use of gunpowder, until we plug our ears and desperately pray to the gods of Olympus, or the brothers of Warner, that they might make an end."

Despite mixed reviews for the film as a whole, Eva Green's performance as the naval leader Artemisia received positive reviews, with some going so far as to say she was more interesting than the heroes, and saved the film. Ty Burr of The Boston Globe stated, "Rise of an Empire may strike some as an improvement on the first film, if only for two reasons: naval warfare and the glorious absurdity of Eva Green." According to Rafer Guzman's Newsday review, "The one bright spot is Eva Green as Xerxes' machinator, Artemesia [sic], a raccoon-eyed warrior princess... Green plays a snarling, insatiable, self-hating femme fatale and completely steals the show." Stephanie Zacharek writing for The Village Voice exclaimed, "Mere mortals of Athens, Sparta, and every city from Mumbai to Minneapolis, behold the magnificent Eva Green, and tremble!"

=== Accolades ===
Award	Category	Recipient	Result	Ref.
15th Golden Trailer Awards	Best Fantasy Adventure	300: Rise of an Empire	Nominated	
15th Golden Trailer Awards	Best Music	300: Rise of an Empire	Nominated	
15th Golden Trailer Awards	Best Fantasy/Adventure TV Spot	300: Rise of an Empire	Nominated	
15th Golden Trailer Awards	Best Wildposts	300: Rise of an Empire	Nominated	
15th Golden Trailer Awards	Trashiest Poster	300: Rise of an Empire	Nominated	
International 3D & Advanced Imaging Society's Creative Arts Awards	Best 2D to 3D Conversion	300: Rise of an Empire	Won	

== Historical accuracy ==
The Guardian's historical films reviewer, Alex von Tunzelmann, discredited the film's historical legitimacy, giving it the classification of "History grade: Fail". She itemizes numerous historical discrepancies in the film, including the pivotal scene in which Themistocles kills Darius the Great at the Battle of Marathon, although he was really absent and died of natural causes only years later. Tunzelmann further quotes the Persian Fire author and historian Tom Holland, who translated Herodotus's Histories, and who is an expert on the Greco-Persian wars, as comparing the film to a wild fantasy substitute for actual historic reality.

Paul Cartledge, a professor of Greek culture at Cambridge University, also noted historical inaccuracies in the film. For example, Darius was not killed as depicted, and neither he nor Xerxes was present at the Battle of Marathon. Artemisia, historically a queen and not an abused orphaned slave, actually argued against sailing into the straits and survived the Persian Wars. In addition, the Spartan Navy contributed a mere 16 warships to the Greek fleet of 400 warships in the ending battle scene, rather than the huge armada shown.

Some critics have identified the film as an example of Iranophobia. Tunzelmann found the film being the same "massive gilded embodiment of orientalism from [its predecessor]". According to Lloyd Llewellyn-Jones, Professor of Ancient History at Cardiff University: "Indeed, the Persians of 300: Rise of an Empire remain the incarnation of every Orientalist cliché imaginable: they are as decadent and oversexed as they are weak and spineless. They are also incapable of winning battles without the help of a Greek traitor: Artemisia, a woman who may be costumed like Xena, a warrior princess, but whose heart is consumed by a crazy desire for power and destruction."According to Khabaronline, an Iranian media outlet, citing the evaluation by Khosrow Mo'tazed, the main message conveyed by this film is that the Iranian nation possesses no history or culture, and that everything originates from Greece.

== Home media ==
300: Rise of an Empire was released on the iTunes Store on June 3, 2014, and was released on DVD and Blu-ray three weeks later, on June 24.

== Sequel ==
In a 2016 interview, Snyder stated that more sequels to 300 would focus on topics beyond Ancient Greece, such as the American Revolutionary War, the Battle of the Alamo, or a battle in China.

In May 2021, Snyder revealed that he had written an Alexander the Great film that was intended to function as a conclusion to the 300 trilogy, adapting the Rise of Alexander segment of Xerxes, but it evolved into having a greater focus on a love story between Alexander and Hephaestion, leading Snyder to think it could not function as a third 300 film, but rather a stand-alone entry in the same fictional universe. The script was retitled Blood and Ashes but it failed to be greenlit by Warner Bros. Pictures.

In December 2023, Snyder revealed that he had regained the rights for Blood and Ashes from Warner Bros. Pictures and was planning on developing the film in the future.

== See also ==
- List of historical drama films
