= Zack Snyder =

American filmmaker (born 1966)

- Snyder at the 2026 Toronto International Film Festival
- Born: Zachary Edward Snyder; March 1, 1966 (age 60); Green Bay, Wisconsin, U.S.
- Education: Art Center College of Design (BFA)
- Occupations: Film director; film producer; screenwriter; cinematographer
- Years active: 1989–present
- Spouses: Denise Weber (divorced); Deborah Johnson (m. 2004)
- Children: 8

Zachary Edward Snyder (born March 1, 1966) is an American filmmaker. After starting his career primarily directing music videos, he made his feature film debut in 2004 with Dawn of the Dead, a remake of the 1978 horror film of the same name. Since then, he has directed or produced a number of comic book and superhero films, including 300 (2006) and Watchmen (2009), as well as the Superman film that started the DC Extended Universe, Man of Steel (2013), and its follow-ups, Batman v Superman: Dawn of Justice (2016) and Justice League (2017), the latter of which had a director's cut released in 2021.

Aside from comic book adaptations, he also directed the animated film Legend of the Guardians: The Owls of Ga'Hoole (2010), the psychological action film Sucker Punch (2011), the zombie heist film Army of the Dead (2021), and the two-parter space opera films Rebel Moon – Part One: A Child of Fire (2023) and Rebel Moon – Part Two: The Scargiver (2024).

In 2004, he founded the production company The Stone Quarry (formerly Cruel and Unusual Films, Inc.) alongside his wife, Deborah Snyder, and producing partner, Wesley Coller.

== Early life and education ==
Zachary Edward Snyder was born on March 1, 1966, in Green Bay, Wisconsin, and raised in Riverside of Greenwich, Connecticut. His mother, Marsha Manley (née Reeves), was a painter and a photography teacher at Daycroft School, which Snyder later attended. His father, Charles Edward "Ed" Snyder, worked as an executive recruiter. Marsha always nurtured her son's artistic side, buying him his first film camera. He has an older sister, Audrey. He also had an older brother, Sam, who died in a car accident when Snyder was a teenager.

Snyder was raised as a Christian Scientist, and attended a summer camp in Harrison, Maine, run by the church.

He studied painting a year after high school at Heatherley School of Fine Art in England, although he had already begun filmmaking. Back in high school, Snyder struggled due to his dyslexia and made his first film there with the camera his mother bought him, using it to make an unflattering commentary about his school's administration that got him expelled. His mother also bought him a subscription to Heavy Metal magazine in his youth to encourage his artistic interest, which, along with Frank Frazetta, helped to shape his artistic tastes. Afterward, Snyder attended Art Center College of Design in Pasadena, California. His classmates included fellow future Hollywood directors Michael Bay and Tarsem Singh. Singh starred in a short film by Snyder. He graduated with a BFA in film in 1989.

The production notes for Snyder's first film Dawn of the Dead describes Snyder as "a comic book and horror film enthusiast in his youth".

== Career ==
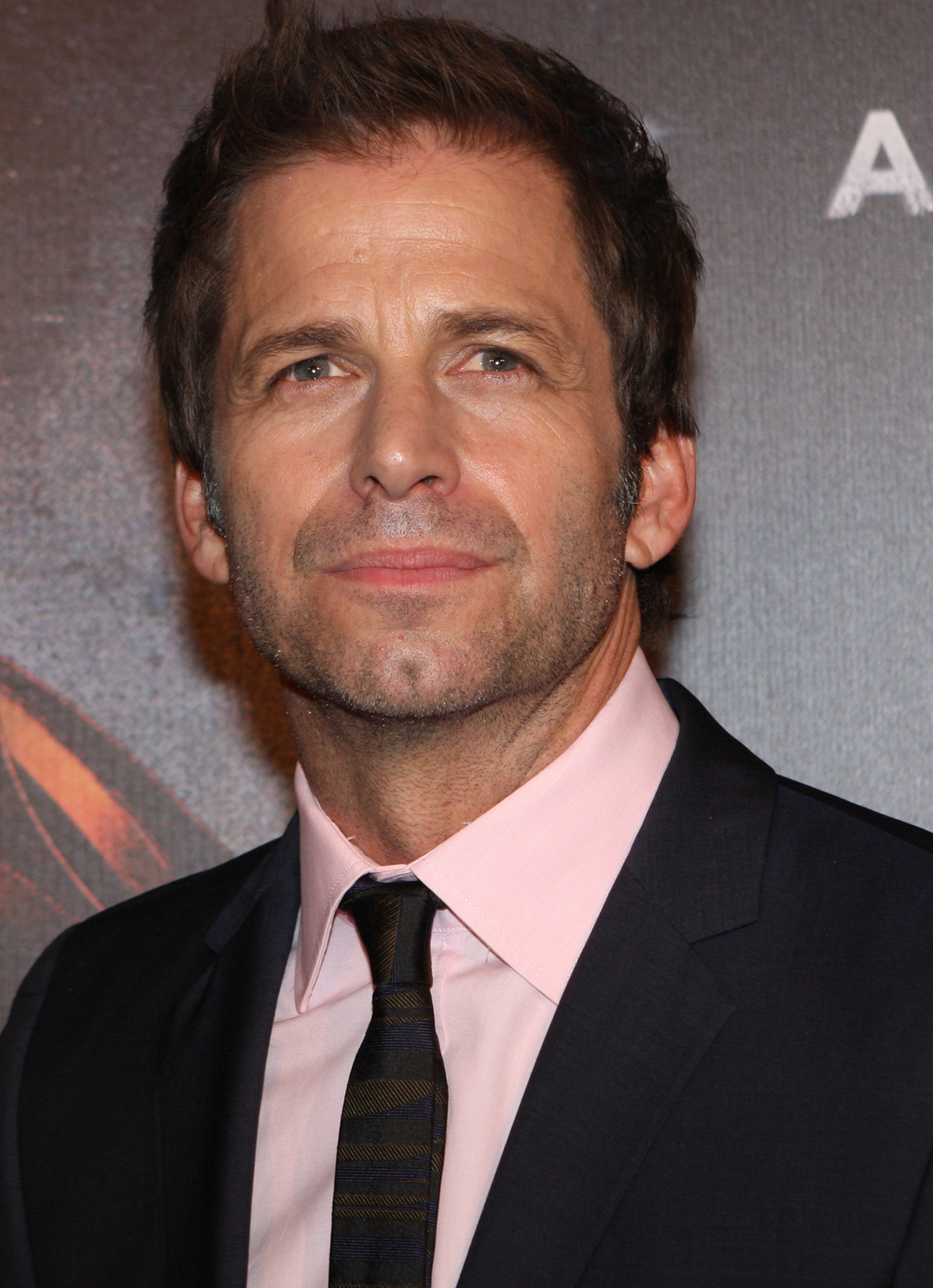
Snyder at Sydney premiere for Man of Steel

After graduating, Snyder directed commercials as well as music videos for ZZ Top and Morrissey, where he met his future wife Deborah, who was then a music producer. Sony bought Snyder to direct his near-feature length S.W.A.T. (2003). Snyder would leave shortly after as he wanted the film to be rated R, and Clark Johnson would replace him soon after. Snyder directed "Respect" for Budweiser, which came out in February 2002. The 60-second commercial depicts a group of horses traveling toward the site of the 9/11 terror attacks to pay their respects to the victims with a bow.

Snyder made his feature film debut with the remake of the horror film Dawn of the Dead (2004), and scored a box office hit with the fantasy war film 300 (2006), adapted from writer-artist Frank Miller's Dark Horse Comics miniseries of the same name. His Warner Bros. film Watchmen was released on March 6, 2009, and grossed $185 million worldwide. His follow-up project/animation debut, Legend of the Guardians: The Owls of Ga'Hoole, was released on September 24, 2010. Snyder produced, co-wrote, and directed Sucker Punch, which was released on March 25, 2011. The film, based on a script written by Snyder and Steve Shibuya, was about a young woman in a mental hospital who fantasizes of escape with her fellow inmates.

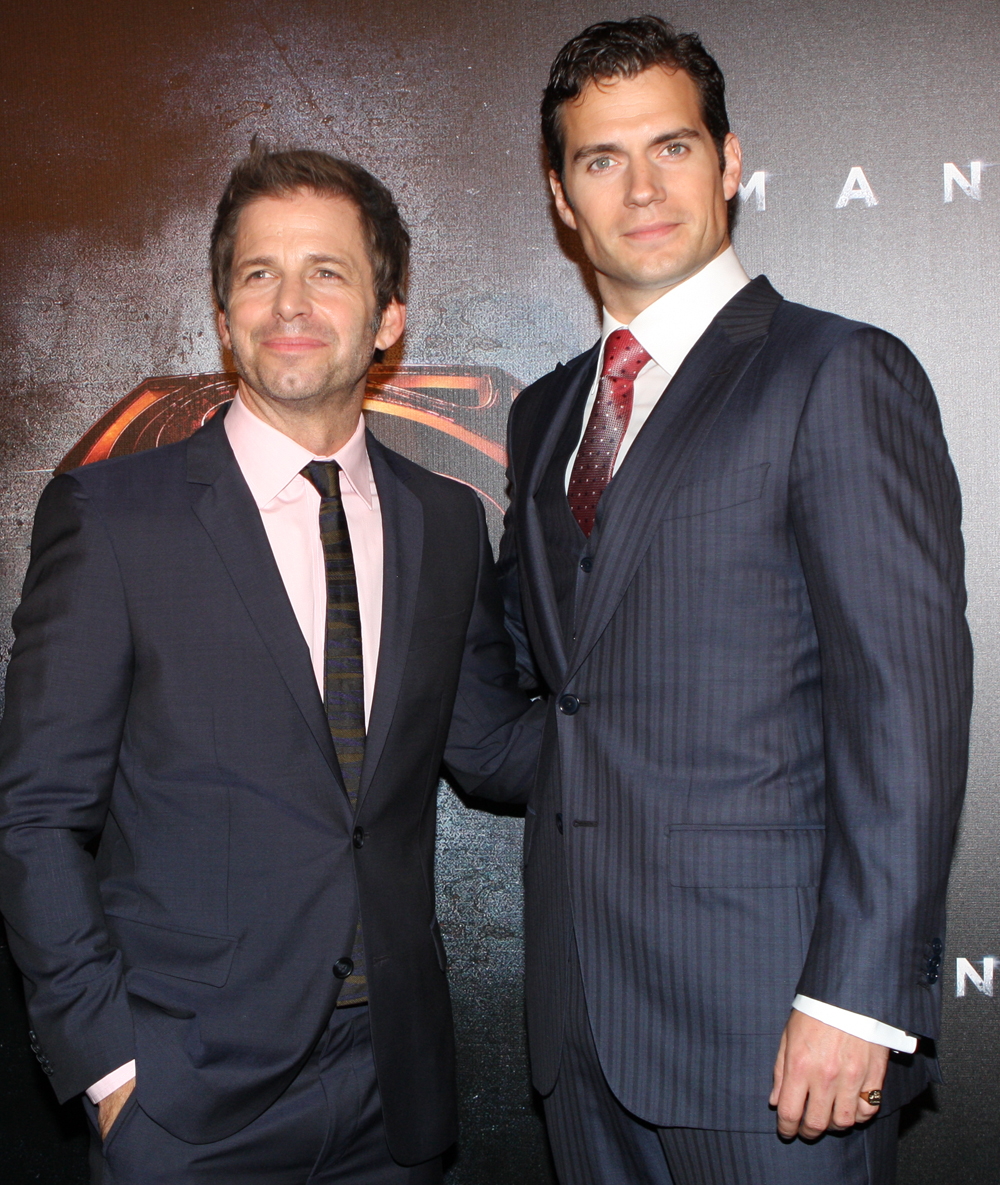
Snyder (left) and Henry Cavill in 2013

He directed 2013's Man of Steel for Warner Bros., a reboot of the Superman franchise and the jumpstart to the DC Extended Universe (DCEU) and produced the prequel/sequel to 300, 300: Rise of an Empire (2014).

During Comic Con 2013, Snyder announced that Batman and Superman would share the screen in Batman v Superman: Dawn of Justice, released in 2016. Snyder directed, Cavill reprised his role as Superman, and Ben Affleck played Batman. Snyder directed Warner Bros.' 2017 Justice League, but he exited during post-production to deal with the death of his daughter, Autumn Snyder. His replacement was Joss Whedon.

On January 29, 2019, Snyder announced that he had signed on to helm Army of the Dead, a zombie heist thriller, for Netflix. Snyder directed and produced the film with his partner and wife, Deborah Snyder, via their newly rebranded production company, The Stone Quarry. His agreement with Netflix has since expanded into several Army of the Dead projects; Army of Thieves, a prequel released in 2021, and Planet of the Dead, a sequel to the first film. He also signed a first-look deal with Netflix and planned to produce a prequel animated series titled Army of the Dead: Lost Vegas. However, all projects related to the franchise were cancelled by August 2024.

On May 20, 2020, Snyder announced that Zack Snyder's Justice League would be released on the streaming service HBO Max in 2021. The film was released on March 18, 2021, dedicated to the memory of his daughter Autumn.

In July 2021, Snyder was officially announced to be developing the film Rebel Moon for Netflix. It was inspired by Star Wars and the films of Akira Kurosawa. Filming began in April 2022 and lasted until November that year, with the project being developed as a two-part film. The first part was released in 2023, while the second part was released in 2024. Snyder planned to film more sequels for the franchise, however, the co-writer Kurt Johnstad stated in May 2025 that they were no longer moving forward with the sequels. Snyder also produced and directed two episodes of Twilight of the Gods, an anime-style web series inspired by Norse mythology, for Netflix.

In May 2021, it was reported that Snyder had been developing Horse Latitudes, a film about two war photographers since 2011, although the project was on hold while he works at Netflix. After a period of relative silence on the film, he mentioned to DC Cinematic Cast on September 13, 2024, that Horse Latitudes had found an investor. In August 2025, it was retitled to The Last Photograph, with Stuart Martin and Fra Fee joining the cast. The film premiered at the 2026 Toronto International Film Festival on September 13, 2026, and received negative reactions.

=== Future and potential projects ===
As of February 2021, Snyder was reported to be developing a King Arthur film, which he stated would be a "faithful retelling" set during the American Gold rush era.

Snyder held the television rights to an adaptation of Black Kiss, a late-1980s comic by Howard Chaykin. Snyder wrote the pilot, but could not find any takers.

In June 2021, Snyder expressed interest in directing a science fiction film adaptation of the Adult Swim cartoon series Rick and Morty, feeling that such a film would be the closest project he could tackle to make a comedy film.

In a November 2023 interview with The Hollywood Reporter, Snyder stated that while he no longer had any interest in tackling superhero comic book adaptations in light of the DCEU continuity's conclusion with Aquaman and the Lost Kingdom, he would only consider returning for the DC Universe if James Gunn invited him back to direct a faithful adaptation of Miller's The Dark Knight Returns comic book. Gunn himself consulted Snyder about the looks of David Corenswet's Superman suit for Superman.

As of November 2024, Snyder was reported to be set to direct a new feature action film for Netflix, centered around the Los Angeles Police Department, co-writing the script with frequent collaborator Kurt Johnstad.

Blood and Ashes would have been the third film set in the world of 300. Snyder and Johnstad wrote the movie during the COVID-19 pandemic on request from Warner Bros, but Warner did not pick the project up. What started as the final piece of a trilogy became its own story as it developed, separate from the main plot of the franchise, but part of the same world. The film would have been a love story about Alexander the Great's relationship with Hephaestion during a time of war. It likely would have been a loose adaptation of the Alexander the Great segments from Frank Miller's graphic novel Xerxes. In 2023, the Stone Quarry gained the movie rights from Warner Bros.

In April 2025, it was reported that Snyder would be directing the film titled Brawler, a film about the UFC, with the involvement from Turki Al-Sheikh and Dana White. Snyder was set to write the screenplay alongside Shay Hatten and Kurt Johnstad.

In June 2026, Snyder was reported to be set to direct a reimagining of John Carpenter's film Escape from New York. Carpenter was due to serve as executive producer on the film project.

== Filmmaking ==
=== Style ===
Snyder often uses slow motion, particularly the technique of speed ramping, in and out of the fight scenes in his films. This differs from other directors who make multiple cuts and close-ups during a fight. A minute-long shot from 300 shows King Leonidas slaughtering his enemies, the camera zooming in and out to emphasize each kill and move Leonidas makes.

Snyder said:

There are other superhero movies where they joke about how basically no one's getting hurt. That's not us. What is that message? That it's okay that there's this massive destruction with zero consequence for anyone? That's what Watchmen was about in a lot of ways too. There was a scene, that scene where Dan and Laurie get mugged. They beat up the criminals. I was like the first guy, I want to show his arm get broken. I want a compound fracture. I don't want it to be clean. I want you to go, 'Oh my God, I guess you're right. If you just beat up a guy in an alley he's not going to just be lying on the ground. It's going to be messy'.

The Netflix production Army of the Dead was a special project for Snyder as he served as his own cinematographer, as well as this being his first film shot digitally. In a 2026 interview with Variety, Snyder said he is "in love with kitsch" and "the highest-art version of kitsch", adding that he has difficulty with straightforward drama without a melodramatic element, which he considers the more interesting aspect, and is self-aware that his movies are "about a thing about a thing".

=== Reception ===
Snyder has been described as one of the most polarizing directors of modern cinema. David Ehrlich of IndieWire wrote that Snyder's "name alone is enough to launch a thousand angry tweets, and the most passionate writing about his work is exclusively found in the comment sections of websites like this one. Snyder's critics really seem to hate him, and Snyder's fans really seem to hate his critics ... Is Snyder a master or a hack? A misunderstood myth-maker, or a meathead with a movie camera?" Film critic Armond White listed Snyder as one of the four best filmmakers of the 2010s. Director James Cameron praised Snyder, listing him as one of the filmmakers who created their own "cinematic language".

== Personal life ==
In 2009, Snyder listed Excalibur, Mad Max 2, A Clockwork Orange, Blue Velvet, and RoboCop as his five favorite films.

=== Family ===
Snyder lives in Pasadena, California with his second wife, producer Deborah Johnson. The couple first met in 1996, began dating in 2002, and married on September 25, 2004, at St. Bartholomew's Episcopal Church in Manhattan, New York City. He was previously married to Denise Weber.

Snyder has eight children: two biological children and two adopted daughters with Weber, two biological sons from a relationship with Kirsten Elin, and two adopted children with Johnson. The suicide of his daughter Autumn prompted Snyder to withdraw from post-production work on Justice League in May 2017 to be with his family, which resulted in Joss Whedon completing the film in his place.

=== Philanthropy ===
Following his daughter's suicide, Snyder became involved in philanthropic activities directed towards suicide prevention and mental health awareness. Snyder promoted this effort on social media by selling clothing and merchandise related to the Snyder Cut; in May 2021, it was revealed that this effort had raised more than $750,000 in charitable donations to the American Foundation for Suicide Prevention.

In another effort to help with suicide prevention, Snyder included a billboard for the American Foundation for Suicide Prevention with the message "You are not alone" in a scene in Zack Snyder's Justice League. The film features other tributes to his late daughter.

Snyder directed two PSAs for the Leukemia & Lymphoma Society in 2018.

In 2021, Snyder partnered with Save the Children, a global child rights organization, to build a 100-bed temporary hospital facility in New Delhi to help fight the COVID-19 pandemic in India.

=== Political views ===
Although his films have been critiqued as having "right-wing" messages, politically, Snyder identifies as a Democrat. He endorsed Joe Biden in the 2020 presidential election. In a 2021 interview with The Guardian, he stated:

I vote Democrat! I'm a true lover of individual rights. I've always been a super-strong advocate of women's rights and a woman's right to choose, and I've always been surrounded by powerful women. And, of course, I'm a huge advocate for the rights of all ethnicities and every walk of life. I would say I'm a pretty liberal guy. I want to make sure everyone's heard and everyone feels included. I don't have a rightwing political agenda. People see what they want to see. For me, that was not certainly the point.

In 2026, Snyder denounced fascism and proclaimed, "I'm pro-gay," saying that he views his film 300 through a gay lens.

== Filmography ==
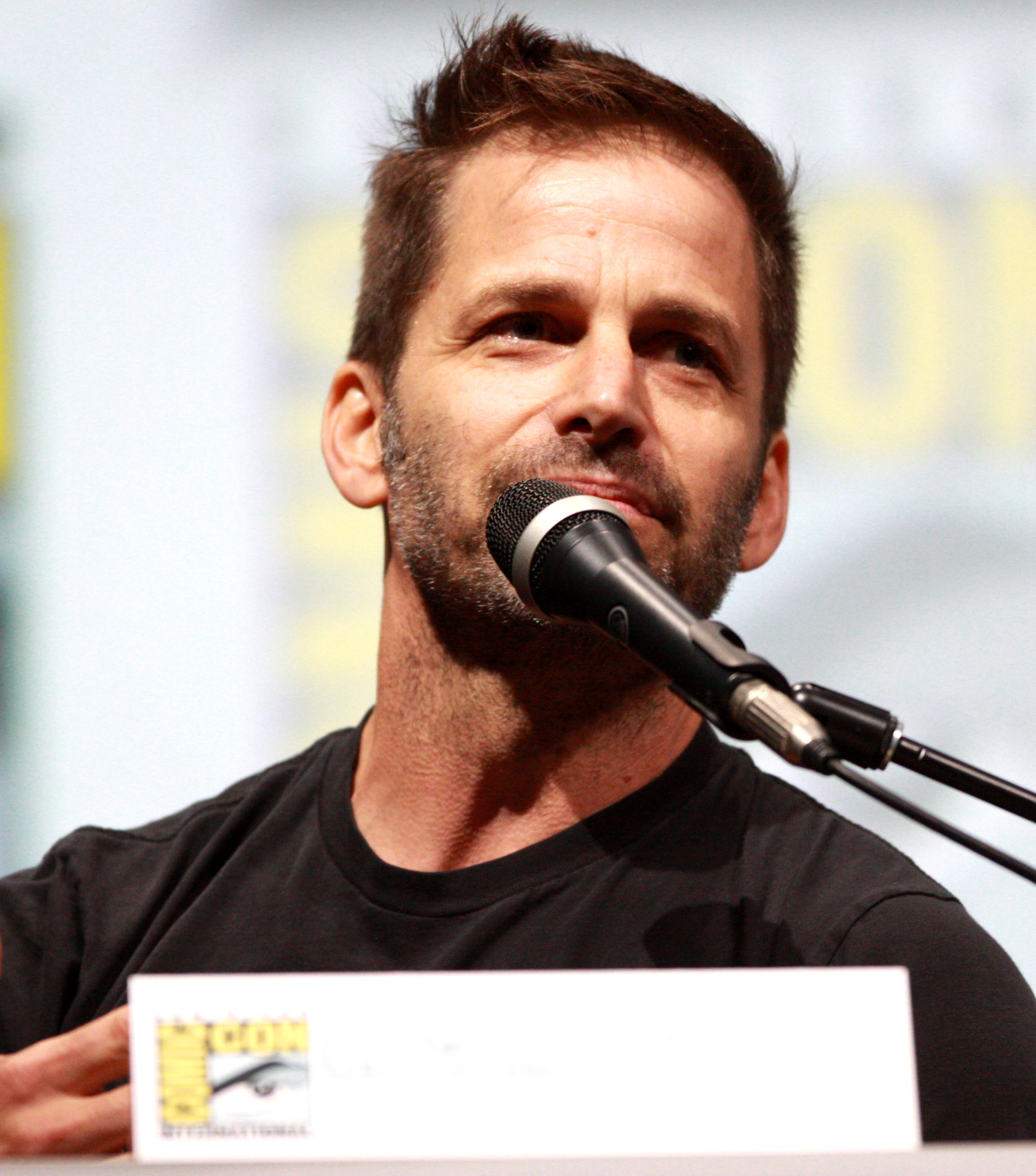
Snyder at 2013 San Diego Comic-Con

=== Feature films ===
Year	Title	Credited as				Notes
Year	Title	Director	Writer	Producer	DoP	Notes
2004	Dawn of the Dead	Yes	No	No	No	
2006	300	Yes	Yes	No	No	Co-wrote with Kurt Johnstad and Michael B. Gordon
2009	Watchmen	Yes	No	No	No	
2010	Legend of the Guardians: The Owls of Ga'Hoole	Yes	No	No	No	First animated film
2011	Sucker Punch	Yes	Yes	Yes	No	Co-wrote with Steve Shibuya
2013	Man of Steel	Yes	No	No	No	
2016	Batman v Superman: Dawn of Justice	Yes	No	No	No	
2017	Justice League	Yes (Note: Snyder was the director of Justice League during principal photography, but was replaced by Joss Whedon during post-production. Snyder retained directorial credit for the finished film, though reports have indicated Whedon reshot a significant portion of the film. Snyder later edited a director's cut of the film, removing all of Whedon's footage and restoring his own footage that was deleted in the theatrical release.)	Story	No	No	Co-wrote story with Chris Terrio
2021	Zack Snyder's Justice League (Note: Snyder shot four to five minutes of additional footage in late 2020 for his cut.)	Yes	Story	No	No	Co-wrote story with Chris Terrio and Will Beall
2021	Army of the Dead	Yes	Yes	Yes	Yes	Co-wrote with Shay Hatten and Joby Harold
2023	Rebel Moon – Part One: A Child of Fire (Note: The R-rated director's cut is retitled Rebel Moon – Chapter One: Chalice of Blood)	Yes	Yes	Yes	Yes	Co-wrote with Kurt Johnstad and Shay Hatten
2024	Rebel Moon – Part Two: The Scargiver (Note: The R-rated director's cut is retitled Rebel Moon – Chapter Two: Curse of Forgiveness)	Yes	Yes	Yes	Yes	Co-wrote with Kurt Johnstad and Shay Hatten
2026	The Last Photograph	Yes	Story	Yes	Yes	

Key
†	Denotes films that have not yet been released

As writer or producer only

Year	Title	Credited as		Title
Year	Title	Writer	Producer	Title
2014	300: Rise of an Empire	Yes	Yes	Co-wrote with Kurt Johnstad
2016	Suicide Squad	No	Executive	Also directed the Flash cameo shot
2017	Wonder Woman	Story	Yes	Co-wrote story with Allan Heinberg and Jason Fuchs
2018	Aquaman	No	Executive	
2020	Wonder Woman 1984	No	Yes	
2021	The Suicide Squad	No	Executive	
2021	Army of Thieves	Story	Yes	Co-wrote story with Shay Hatten

=== Short films ===
Year	Title	Credited as				Notes
Year	Title	Director	Writer	Producer	DoP	Notes
1990	Playground	Yes	No	No	No	Direct-to-video documentary
2004	The Lost Tape: Andy's Terrifying Last Days Revealed	Yes	No	No	No	
2009	Tales of the Black Freighter	No	Yes	Executive	No	Direct-to-video
2009	Under the Hood	No	No	Executive	No	Direct-to-video
2013	Superman 75th Anniversary	Yes	Story	No	No	Co-wrote story with Bruce Timm
2017	Snow Steam Iron	Yes	Yes	Yes	Yes	Shot on a mobile phone

=== Music videos ===
Year	Artist	Song
1989	Lizzy Borden	"Love Is a Crime"
1992	Peter Murphy	"You're So Close"
1992	Morrissey	"Tomorrow"
1992	Soul Asylum	"Somebody to Shove"
1993	Soul Asylum	"Black Gold"
1993	Alexander O'Neal	"In the Middle"
1993	Paul Westerberg	"World Class Fad"
1994	ZZ Top	"World of Swirl"
1994	Dionne Farris	"I Know"
1995	Rod Stewart	"Leave Virginia Alone"
2009	My Chemical Romance	"Desolation Row"

=== Television ===
Year	Title	Creator	Director	Executive Producer	Notes
2024	Twilight of the Gods	Yes	Yes	Yes	Directed 2 episodes; Co-created with Jay Oliva and Eric Carrasco

Acting credits

Year	Title	Role	Notes
2022	Teen Titans Go!	Himself	Episode: "365!"
2025	The Studio	Himself	Episode "The Golden Globes"
2025	Rick and Morty	Himself	Episode "Ricker than Fiction"

== Awards and nominations ==
Snyder's body of work has earned him a number of awards, including two Clio Awards and a Gold Lion Award for his Jeep "Frisbee" commercial. He also won the Society of British Advertisers Award for Humor for his controversial EB Beer commercial "General's Party."

Year	Award	Category	Nominee	Result
2004	Cannes Film Festival	Golden Camera	Dawn of the Dead	Nominated
2007	Golden Schmoes Award	Best Director of the Year	300	Nominated
2007	Hollywood Film Award	Hollywood Movie of the Year	300	Won
2008	Saturn Award	Best Director	300	Won
2008	Saturn Award	Best Writing (Shared with Michael B. Gordon & Kurt Johnstad)	300	Nominated
2009	ShoWest Award	Director of the Year	Watchmen	Won
2010	Saturn Award	Best Director	Watchmen	Nominated
2010	SFX Award	Best Director	Watchmen	Nominated
2010	St. Louis Film Critics Association Award	Best Animated Feature Film	Legend of the Guardians: The Owls of Ga'Hoole	Nominated
2013	Hollywood Film Award	Hollywood Movie of the Year	Man of Steel	Nominated
2014	Jupiter Award	Best International Film	Man of Steel	Nominated
2017	Golden Raspberry Award	Worst Director	Batman v Superman: Dawn of Justice	Nominated
2017	Jupiter Award	Best International Film	Batman v Superman: Dawn of Justice	Nominated
2017	Dragon Awards	Best Science Fiction or Fantasy Movie (Shared with Patty Jenkins, Allan Heinberg & Jason Fuchs	Wonder Woman	Won
2017	Satellite Awards	Best Adapted Screenplay (Shared with Allan Heinberg & Jason Fuchs	Wonder Woman	Nominated
2018	American Film Institute	Top Ten Films of the Year (Shared with Charles Roven, Richard Suckle & Deborah Snyder)	Wonder Woman	Won
2018	Producers Guild of America Awards	Best Theatrical Motion Picture (Shared with Charles Roven, Richard Suckle & Deborah Snyder	Wonder Woman	Nominated
2018	Hugo Awards	Best Dramatic Presentation - Long Form (Shared with Patty Jenkins, Allan Heinberg & Jason Fuchs	Wonder Woman	Won
2021	Hollywood Critics Association	Valiant Award	Himself	Won
2021	Dragon Awards	Best Science Fiction or Fantasy Movie	Zack Snyder's Justice League	Nominated
2022	Academy Awards	Oscars Cheer Moment	"The Flash enters the speed force" – Zack Snyder's Justice League	Won
2022	Academy Awards	Oscars Fan Favorite	Army of the Dead	Won
2024	Joy Awards	Honorary Entertainment Makers Award	Himself	Won

== Recognition ==
Despite his cinematic vision giving rise to polarized opinions, Zack Snyder is strongly recognized for bringing a very influential cinematic language to mainstream Hollywood from the 2000s onwards, notable for adopting a high level of visual refinement, epic stories and films with deconstructivist and political narratives, which is reflected in the existence of several films with a large scale of production and long duration, such as Zack Snyder's Justice League.

Oscar-winner director James Cameron, in an interview given to Comic Book Debate about the filmmakers that have at times influenced him, mentioned that the work Snyder did on 300 was pretty revolutionary at the time and introduced a new "cinematic language", along with the names of Robert Rodriguez and Ridley Scott. Christopher Nolan, one of the most awarded directors of the 21st century, pointed Snyder's work as a contemporary influency on science fiction and superhero movies, stating that "There's no superhero science-fiction film coming out these days where (he) don't see some influence of Zack". He also emphasized the emotional power that is very characteristic of Snyder's filmography: "When you watch a Zack Snyder film, you see and feel his love for the potential of cinema. The potential of it to be fantastical, to be heightened in its reality, but to move you and to excite you."

Nolan is particularly fond of two of Snyder's films: Man of Steel and Watchmen. With regard to the former, he singled it out for its dramatic impact, highlighted by a scene about fatherhood between Clark and Jonathan Kent: "The moment in Man of Steel where Kevin Costner tells young Clark that whatever his origin, he's still his son puts a lump in my throat every time." In Watchmen, its emphasis is on the avant-garde element of the work in the genre of superhero films, especially films dealing with groups of heroes and their complex interactions: "I've always believed Watchmen was ahead of its time. The idea of a superhero team, which it so brilliantly subverts, wasn't yet a thing in movies. It would have been fascinating to see it released post-Avengers."

Snyder is also recognized by his strong visual storytelling. In a commentary about his horror-remake Dawn of the Dead, Stephen King, one of the most notable writers of horror novels of all time, described his movie as "scary" and "perfectly crafted", especially its opening sequence: "Genius perfected would be Zack Snyder's 2004 Dawn [of the Dead] remake, which begins with one of the best opening sequences of a horror film ever made."

However, his best-known work came to be Zack Snyder's Justice League, the result of a huge grassroots campaign for the release of the director's version of Justice League, which fell victim to a series of alterations after the director stepped down following the death of his daughter. Renowned directors and filmmakers such as Hideo Kojima, the Russo Brothers, David Lowery, Kevin Smith and Ben Affleck expressed their support for the director's cut. It was responsible for turning Snyder into a pop culture phenomenon, generating several references in the industry for its enormous adherence to the director's cuts.

In addition to his work as a director, Snyder also stands out for writing scripts and stories for many films he directs or only produces, with a special mention for Wonder Woman, named one of the 10 best films of 2017 by the American Film Institute.

He is also one of the highest-grossing film directors of all time, being in the top 40 of the worldwide ranking.
