= Steve Shibuya =

American screenwriter

Steve Shibuya is an American screenwriter. He co-wrote the screenplay for the 2011 film Sucker Punch along with director Zack Snyder.
