= Kurt Johnstad =

American screenwriter

- Johnstad at the 2026 Toronto International Film Festival
- Born: Kurt Olaf Johnstad
- Occupation: Screenwriter
- Spouse: Karen Alexander

Kurt Johnstad is an American screenwriter. He has worked on several films including 300, for which he was nominated for a Saturn Award, along with Michael Gordon and Zack Snyder. He also wrote the screenplays for Act of Valor, 300: Rise of an Empire, Atomic Blonde, and The Last Photograph, and was tapped to write one of two competing screenplays for Aquaman; Will Beall's script was eventually chosen for the film.

== Early life and education ==
Johnstad grew up working on a cattle farm in Wisconsin. Among his family were two sisters and his father, an Air Force fighter pilot, and mother, an English teacher. Johnstad graduated high school at 16 and spent a year traveling. He enrolled in the California Institute of the Arts in 1986 to study film and completed the program in three years.

== Career ==
Johnstad began working on music videos and television movies for the next four years. Among the people he had worked with was director Zack Snyder, who offered him a job as his first assistant director which lead the two to work with each other for the next ten years.

Johnstad would later work on scripts and in the mid-1990s, a low-budget action film True Vengeance was released in 1997. Snyder asked Johnstad to assist him with his film 300, a fictionalized graphic novel adaptation of Frank Miller's comic involving the Battle of Thermopylae. The film got him nominated for a Saturn Award along with Snyder and Michael Gordon.

In 2011, Johnstad was working with Snyder to co-write the film The Last Photograph and 300: The Battle of Artemisia (which would eventually become 300: Rise of an Empire) for Warner Bros. Johnstad also worked outside of collaborations with Snyder, and was hired by producers Basil Iwanyk and Jason Netter to adapt Max Allan Collins’ novel Black Hats. His next screenplays that were produced was Act of Valor and 300: Rise of an Empire.

In 2015, Variety described Johnstad as beginning "to make a name for himself as writer who delivers big action in his scripts, along with classic heroes audiences love to root for." His screenplay based on The Coldest City by Antony Johnston was announced that year. The film was titled Atomic Blonde and released on July 28, 2017.

Films Johnstad has been assigned to write screenplays for include The Lost Legion for Warner Bros. and Dan Lin, and Aquaman where another script was concurrently in development, by Will Beall. Beall's script was later used for the film.

== Filmography ==
Year	Title	Writer	Executive producer	Ref(s)	Notes
1997	True Vengeance	Yes	No		
2006	300	Yes	No		
2012	Act of Valor	Yes	No		
2014	300: Rise of an Empire	Yes	No		
2017	Atomic Blonde	Yes	Yes		
2023	Rebel Moon – Part One: A Child of Fire	Yes	Yes		
2024	Rebel Moon – Part Two: The Scargiver	Yes	Yes		
2026	The Last Photograph	Yes	No		
