= Atomic Blonde =

2017 film by David Leitch

- Theatrical release poster
- Directed by: David Leitch
- Screenplay by: Kurt Johnstad
- Based on: The Coldest City by: Antony Johnston; Sam Hart
- Produced by: Eric Gitter; Peter Schwerin; Kelly McCormick; Charlize Theron; A. J. Dix; Beth Kono
- Starring: Charlize Theron; James McAvoy; John Goodman; Til Schweiger; Eddie Marsan; Sofia Boutella; Toby Jones
- Cinematography: Jonathan Sela
- Edited by: Elísabet Ronaldsdóttir
- Music by: Tyler Bates
- Production companies: Sierra Pictures; Denver and Delilah Productions; Chickie the Cop; TGIM Films; 87Eleven Productions
- Distributed by: Focus Features
- Release dates: March 12, 2017 (SXSW); July 28, 2017 (United States)
- Running time: 115 minutes
- Country: United States
- Languages: English; German; Russian
- Budget: $30 million
- Box office: $100 million

Atomic Blonde is a 2017 American action thriller film directed by David Leitch (receiving his first credit as feature film director) from a screenplay by Kurt Johnstad, based on the 2012 graphic novel The Coldest City by Antony Johnston and Sam Hart. The film stars Charlize Theron (who also served as a co-producer), James McAvoy, John Goodman, Til Schweiger, Eddie Marsan, Sofia Boutella, and Toby Jones.

The story revolves around a spy who has to find a list of covert agents that is being smuggled into the West on the eve of the collapse of the Berlin Wall in 1989.

Atomic Blonde premiered at South by Southwest on March 12, 2017, and was released in the United States on July 28, by Focus Features. The film was a box-office hit, grossing $100 million worldwide against a budget of $30 million, and received generally positive reviews from critics. Many compared the film to the John Wick series, for which Leitch was an uncredited co-director and producer of the first film. As of April 2020, a sequel was in development.

== Plot ==
In November 1989, days before the collapse of the Berlin Wall, KGB agent Yuri Bakhtin kills MI6 agent James Gascoigne and steals his watch, which contains a microfilm document with a list of the names of every intelligence agent active in Berlin.

A day later, top-level MI6 spy Lorraine Broughton is dispatched to recover the list of names. She is told to keep an eye out for Satchel, a mysterious double agent for the KGB. Arriving in Berlin, Lorraine is picked up by two men, but realizes they are KGB agents and escapes from them after one mentions their boss, Aleksander Bremovych. She is then picked up by her real contact, maverick MI6 station head David Percival.

Lorraine searches Gascoigne's apartment and discovers a picture of him and Percival. Percival has previously denied knowing Gascoigne, so, when the West Berlin police ambush her while she's searching Gascoigne's apartment, Lorraine suspects Percival. When she visits a restaurant mentioned by the KGB agents, she encounters Bremovych, but their meeting is interrupted by novice French agent Delphine Lasalle. Although initially suspicious of Lasalle, Lorraine later enters into a relationship with her. Lasalle suggests that they should work together.

Percival, having tailed Lorraine, surveils a watchmaker she visited and spots Bakhtin. Lorraine is informed that Satchel's identity has been compromised. Percival kills Bakhtin and takes the wristwatch, from which he discovers Satchel's identity.

Meanwhile, Lorraine learns that Spyglass, the Stasi officer who gave the list to Gascoigne, has memorized it. Unaware that Percival has the list, she makes plans with him to escort Spyglass to West Berlin. Percival meets with Bremovych and offers Satchel's identity "to keep the balance", and tips him off about their plan to extricate Spyglass. Lasalle covertly photographs the meeting.

During the extrication of Spyglass, Percival secretly shoots and wounds him. Lorraine battles multiple KGB agents while trying to escape with Spyglass, but after a grueling fight and a car chase, their car is pushed into the river and Spyglass drowns. Lorraine makes it to West Berlin and realizes Percival has planted a bug in her coat.

Lorraine tells Lasalle, who calls Percival and threatens him with her knowledge of his Bremovych meeting. He then goes to Lasalle's apartment and kills her, fleeing as Lorraine arrives moments later. She finds Lasalle's photographs and realizes Percival has the list. He attempts to flee, but Lorraine intercepts, kills him, and takes the list.

It is now ten days since Gascoigne was killed. Lorraine is debriefed by MI6 executive Eric Gray and CIA officer Emmett Kurzfeld. While there, she discovers that Percival told Gray he had the list and he was "very close to Satchel". Lorraine presents Lasalle's photographs and doctored audio recordings, which paint Percival as Satchel. She denies knowing the list's whereabouts, leaving MI6 no choice but to close the case.

Three days later in Paris, Lorraine, now speaking in Russian, meets with Bremovych, who addresses her as "Comrade Satchel". He, having learned from Percival there was more to Satchel than he had previously known, orders his men to kill her, but she kills them. Speaking with an American accent, she explains to Bremovych she has always fed him misinformation to manipulate the KGB, then kills him.

Later, she and Kurzfeld return to the United States with the list. In their conversation, it is implied that Lorraine is actually a triple agent and has been working for the CIA all along.

== Cast ==
- Charlize Theron as Lorraine Broughton, a top-level MI6 field agent.
- James McAvoy as David Percival, a maverick MI6 Berlin station chief who is assigned to assist Lorraine in her mission.
- John Goodman as Emmett Kurzfeld, a senior CIA agent working with MI6.
- Til Schweiger as The Watchmaker, a mysterious neutral character who crafts special watches hiding codes inside.
- Eddie Marsan as "Spyglass", the Stasi defector who gives the list to Gascoigne.
- Sofia Boutella as Delphine Lasalle, an undercover French agent.
- Roland Møller as Aleksander Bremovych, a high-ranking Russian KGB operative in Berlin.
- Jóhannes Jóhannesson as Yuri Bakhtin, the rogue KGB agent who kills Gascoigne and steals the list.
- James Faulkner as "C", head of MI6.
- Barbara Sukowa as the coroner, who is in charge of releasing Gascoigne's body to Lorraine.
- Toby Jones as Eric Gray, Lorraine's MI6 superior.

In addition, Sam Hargrave and Bill Skarsgård make brief appearances as MI6 agent James Gascoigne and as Lorraine's East German contact and presumed CIA ally Merkel, respectively. Daniel Bernhardt also played a strong thug working for Bremovych who fights Lorraine several times.

== Production ==
=== Development ===
An adaptation of the graphic novel The Coldest City was announced in May 2015. Described by Variety as a "Passion Project" for Theron, she first came across the story five years prior, when her production company Denver and Delilah Productions was sent the then-unpublished graphic novel. Theron's interest in the first John Wick movie inspired her to get David Leitch, one of the directors, to helm the project. Leitch eventually left John Wick: Chapter 2 to direct the film. According to Theron, the success of Mad Max: Fury Road helped guide the development of Atomic Blonde. The film features a bisexual subplot that was not in the original book. This came from writer Kurt Johnstad, who suggested it after Theron was "thinking about how do you make this different from other spy movies". Leitch has insisted that the scenes are not there to be "provocative", but "more about if you are a spy you will do whatever it takes to get information" and how the main character "find[s] her intimacies and her friendships in small doses".

Theron's casting as the lead was announced in May 2015, while James McAvoy was announced that October. In November, John Goodman was reported as also being in talks to join the film. It was originally hoped that David Bowie would play a part in the film, although he turned down the offer shortly before his death. To prepare for the role, Theron worked with eight personal trainers, who "basically made [her] puke every single day". During the process, Theron cracked her teeth from clenching her jaw and had to get them fixed in surgery. She also bruised a rib during her training. As Theron's training for the movie overlapped with Keanu Reeves' training for John Wick: Chapter 2, the two developed a competitive relationship, which included sparring together.

=== Filming ===
Principal photography on the film began on November 22, 2015, in Budapest, and later moved to Berlin. The stairwell scene was almost 10 minutes of long take. In the fight scene on that stairwell, Charlize Theron accidentally broke two of her teeth.

=== Music ===
From the start, Leitch felt that using the right songs for the project was crucial. Part of this was attempting to answer the question "How do you reinvent this stuffy Cold War spy movie?" The soundtrack uses a combination of 1980s songs as well as covers of them. The latter were used to add "a contemporized feeling of the '80s". The movie's producers were initially worried that they would not be able to get the rights to all the songs that Leitch wanted to use, but Leitch himself estimated that around 75% of his picks made it into the final product. Though the Berlin Wall fell in 1989, the concentration of iconic songs was from the first half of the 1980s, with the exception of George Michael's 1988 chart-topping "Father Figure", which itself was Leitch's second choice after the 1986 release "Take My Breath Away" by Berlin.

== Release ==
In May 2015, Focus Features acquired distribution rights to the film for North and Latin America, the U.K., Ireland, Australia, New Zealand, France, Germany, Italy, the Benelux, China and Switzerland. It was initially scheduled to be released on August 11, 2017, before being moved up to July 28, 2017. The film had its world premiere at the South by Southwest on March 12, 2017.

== Reception ==
=== Box office ===
Atomic Blonde grossed $51.7 million in the United States and Canada and $48.3 million in other territories, for a worldwide total of $100 million, against a production budget of $30 million.

In North America, Atomic Blonde was projected to gross around $20 million from 3,304 theaters during its first weekend. It grossed $1.52 million from Thursday night previews at 2,685 theaters. After making $7.1 million on its first day (including previews), the film went on to open to $18.3 million, finishing fourth at the box office, behind Dunkirk, The Emoji Movie and Girls Trip. In its second weekend the film dropped 55% to $8.2 million, finishing seventh at the box office. It made $4.5 million in its third week and $2.2 million in its fourth, finishing 10th and 13th at the box office, respectively.

=== Critical response ===
On review aggregation website Rotten Tomatoes, the film has an approval rating of 79% based on 365 reviews, with an average rating of 6.6/10. The website's critical consensus reads, "Atomic Blonde gets enough mileage out of its stylish action sequences – and ever-magnetic star – to make up for a narrative that's somewhat less hard-hitting than its protagonist." On Metacritic, the film has a weighted average score of 63 out of 100, based on reviews from 50 critics, indicating "generally favorable" reviews. Audiences polled by CinemaScore gave the film an average grade of "B" on an A+ to F scale.

Richard Roeper of the Chicago Sun-Times gave the film 3.5 out of 4 stars, saying: "Borrow from Bourne and Bond. Rinse and repeat. This is the recipe for the quite ridiculous, ultra-violent and deliriously entertaining Atomic Blonde, a slick vehicle for the magnetic, badass charms of Charlize Theron, who is now officially an A-list action star on the strength of this film and Mad Max: Fury Road." Writing for Rolling Stone, Peter Travers praised the cast and fight scenes, giving it 3 stars out of 4 and saying, "It's the fight scenes that count – and they're astonishingly good, from a mano-a-mano beatdown involving Theron's stiletto heel and a thug's jugular vein to a climactic free-for-all in a swanky hotel suite where 99 Luftballons scores every gunshot and gut-punch."

Jake Coyle of the Associated Press gave the film 2/4 stars, calling it "largely a vacant, hyper-stylistic romp that trades on the thick Cold War atmosphere of far better films".

== Future ==
=== Sequel ===
In July 2017, Leitch expressed a desire to develop a sequel film to Atomic Blonde, saying that the project is dependent on the first film's success. In May 2018, Theron confirmed that a sequel was in active development. By July 2019, Leitch announced that the project is in development as a production deal with a streaming service company, while the filmmaker's wife Kelly McCormick, will return as producer. By April 2020, it was announced the film was in development as a Netflix exclusive film, while Theron will also be a producer.

=== Potential crossover with John Wick ===
In July 2017, Leitch was asked about the potential of a crossover film featuring Atomic Blonde and the John Wick franchise. Leitch directed the former, after previously co-directing the first John Wick film. The filmmaker stated that it sounded like a great idea.

== Works cited ==
- Donnelly, Matt (July 29, 2017). "'Atomic Blonde' Accused of Using #BuryYourGays Trope (Spoilers)". TheWrap.
- Dry, Jude (July 28, 2017). "Why 'Atomic Blonde' Earns Its Steamy Charlize Theron Lesbian Sex Scene". IndieWire.
- Setoodeh, Ramin (July 11, 2017). "Hear Her Roar: Charlize Theron's 'Atomic Blonde' Furthers the Action Genre for Female Badass Stars". Variety. Penske Media Corporation.
