= Giles Hardie =

Australian film critic and journalist

- Born: 16 October 1975 (age 51); Melbourne, Victoria
- Occupations: Film critic; journalist; presenter; producer
- Employer: Fairfax Media
- Known for: The Sydney Morning Herald, The Spoiler Guys
- Website: Official site smh.com.au

Giles George Beresford Hardie is an Australian film critic, entertainment journalist, producer and television personality.

== Film reviewing ==
In 2008, Hardie established the weekly Pick of the Flicks film review video that appears on Fairfax Media websites, including The Sydney Morning Herald and The Age. He is the writer, producer and host of the segment which reviews mainstream films in their week of release in Australian cinemas.

He has interviewed a large number of celebrities on camera for Fairfax Media, including the cast of Harry Potter, Vince Vaughn and Jason Bateman and Hugh Jackman.

Hardie has written a film blog on The Sydney Morning Herald website since October 2008, entitled Get Flick'd. It includes the annual list of the best and worst films of the year.

In 2011, he was appointed Entertainment Editor for The Sydney Morning Herald online.

Hardie formerly covered cinema across the Fairfax Media websites including smh.com.au, theage.com.au, brisbanetimes.com.au and WAtoday.com.au. His last article for Fairfax Media was get Flick'd The best and worst films of 2013.

He was the regular film critic on 702ABC's Evenings with Dom Knight and KOFM's Breakfast with David and Tanya.

In addition to his regular commitments, Hardie has appeared as a film critic and expert on many Australian radio and television programmes including Today Australia, Sunrise, The Morning Show, Today Tonight, Lateline and the ABC News 24 channel.

Along with Marc Fennell and Alice Tynan, Hardie established the Spoiler Guys podcast in 2012, dissecting new release films in a light-hearted manner on a weekly basis, without regard for plot spoilers.

== Television ==
In 2007 Hardie was arrested as one of the 11 participants in a prank carried out by The Chaser for the ABC television show The Chaser's War on Everything at the Sydney APEC summit. In the stunt, a fake Canadian motorcade was waved through the security perimeter into the exclusion zone. Hardie was one of the actors dressed as security guards running alongside the motorcade. The charges against Hardie and all other participants were dropped in April 2008.

Hardie is a regular guest on the Nine Network's Mornings show, where he can be seen discussing film and television stars with hosts David Campbell and Sonia Kruger.

From 2011 to 2012 he was a regular host and panellist on The Movie Club on Foxtel's Showtime network.

In 2013 Hardie took on the role of regular host and panellist for Fairfax's The Guide show, reviewing television shows going to air in Australia. His review of Please Like Me was used in promotions for the show.

== Producer ==
Giles Hardie has a degree in Television Producing from the Australian Film Television and Radio School (AFTRS).

Hardie was one of the producers on the Nine Network's controversial daytime television show The Catch-Up. Due to low ratings, the show was cancelled on 13 June 2007 and the last episode aired on 15 June.

Hardie also regularly produces digital video projects for Fairfax Media. In addition to one-off videos, he has produced a number of series including Sexperts, Ask Sam, The S Word, Digital Life, Kitchen Secrets and Behind the Scenes.
