= Noam Murro =

Israeli film director

- נועם מורו
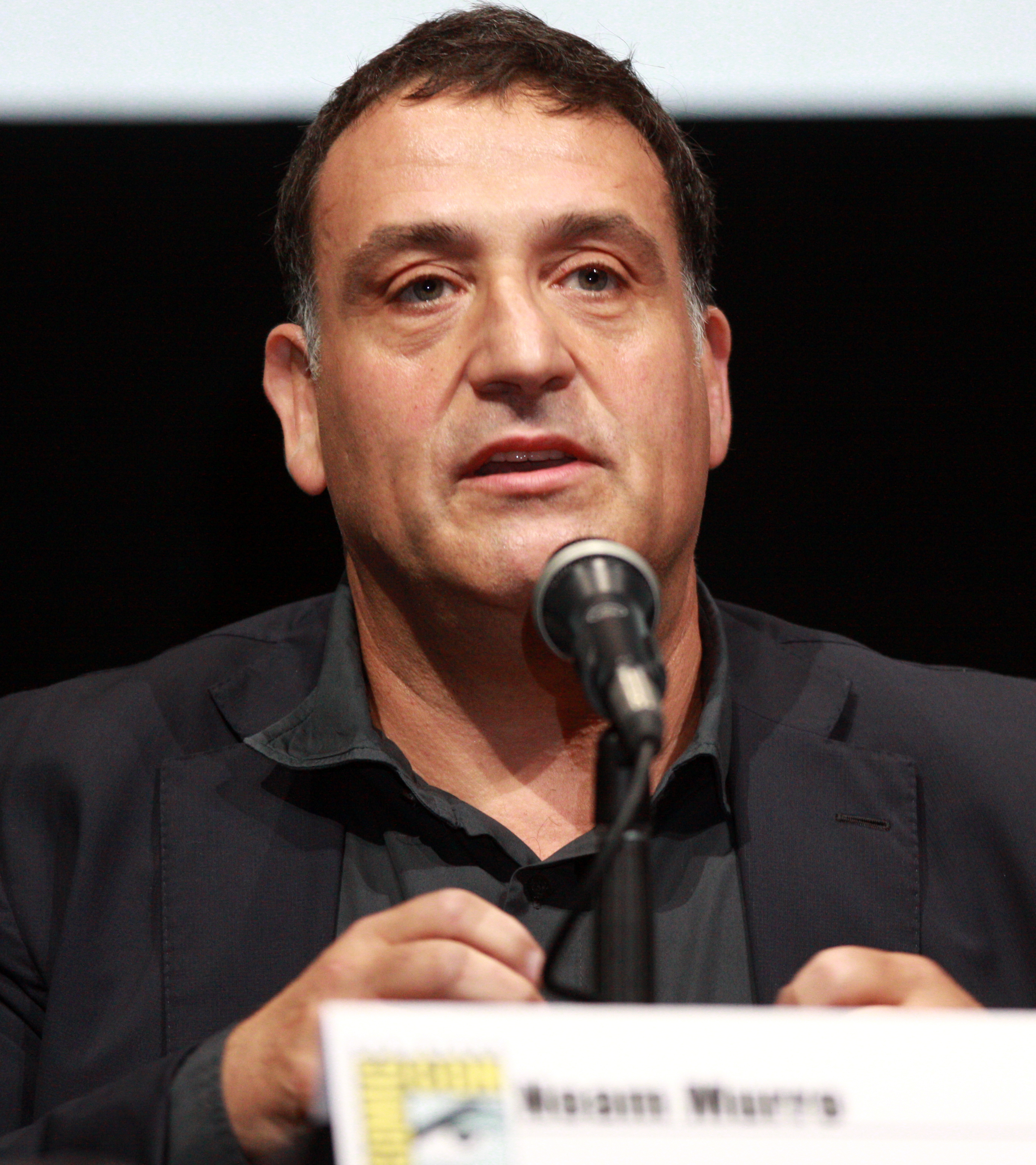
- Noam Murro at the 2013 San Diego Comic-Con
- Born: August 16, 1961 (age 65); Jerusalem, Israel
- Education: Bezalel Academy of Art and Design
- Occupations: Film director, film producer
- Years active: 2005–present

Noam Murro (Hebrew: נועם מורו; born August 16, 1961) is an Israeli film director and film producer. He is best known for directing the films Smart People, 300: Rise of an Empire, and the BBC miniseries Watership Down.

== Early and personal life ==
Murro was born and raised in Jerusalem, Israel, to a family of Jewish background.

In the early 1990s, after completing his studies in design and architecture at the Bezalel Academy of Arts and Design in Jerusalem, Murro left Israel for New York. Although he never received a formal education in film, Murro decided his dream was to become a filmmaker. "As a boy I worked for Lia van Leer at the Jerusalem Cinematheque. I got my film education there, watching films. I worked as an usher, I replaced reels, I cleaned the theater, whatever needed doing, and I got to see two movies a day. I did this for two years, without pay, just so I could see movies."

He resides in Los Angeles with his wife and children.

== Career ==
After studying architecture and establishing himself over the years as an advertising director, he was nominated six times for the DGA Awards, winning the award in 2005. Along with Shawn Lacy Tessaro, he founded the production company Biscuit Films, which has produced many successful advertising campaigns. In 2004, he was originally set to direct The Ring Two but left the film due to "creative differences". In 2012, he directed advertising campaigns for well-known brands such as Adidas, Nike, eBay, Volkswagen, Land Rover, Toshiba, Stella Artois and many others. In 2008, Murro made his directorial debut with Smart People, a comedy presented at the 2008 Sundance Film Festival. In 2011, he was chosen to direct A Good Day to Die Hard but left production in August 2011, to direct the 300 sequel, 300: Rise of an Empire. John Moore was subsequently drafted in to replace him.

== Filmography ==
Film

- Smart People (2008)
- 300: Rise of an Empire (2014)

Miniseries

- Watership Down (2018) (Also executive producer)
