= The Last Photograph (2026 film) =

Film by Zack Snyder

- Promotional teaser poster
- Directed by: Zack Snyder
- Screenplay by: Kurt Johnstad
- Story by: Zack Snyder
- Produced by: Deborah Snyder; Zack Snyder; Gianni Nunnari; Wesley Coller
- Starring: Stuart Martin; Fra Fee
- Cinematography: Zack Snyder
- Edited by: Melissa Remenarich-Aperlo
- Music by: Hans Zimmer; Omer Benyamin; Steven Doar
- Production companies: The Stone Quarry; Hollywood Gang Productions
- Release date: September 13, 2026 (TIFF)
- Running time: 135 minutes
- Country: United States
- Language: English

The Last Photograph is a 2026 American thriller film directed by Zack Snyder from a screenplay by Kurt Johnstad, based on an original story by Snyder. It stars Stuart Martin and Fra Fee and follows a former DEA agent who goes into a South American jungle to get revenge, where the harsh landscape mixes with his personal troubles.

The film had its world premiere in the "Special Events" section of the 2026 Toronto International Film Festival on September 13. The film was widely panned by critics.

== Premise ==
An ex-DEA operative searches the South American mountains for his missing niece and nephew after their parents are murdered. With the help of a war photographer who witnessed the killers, he confronts his past as their journey blurs the line between reality and the surreal.

== Cast ==
- Stuart Martin as Ethan Black
- Fra Fee
- Costanza Andrade
- Marlon Moreno
- Quique Mendoza
- Gustavo Angarita
- Ed Hughes
- Paulina Diazgranados
- Pedro Calvo-Anca
- Mia Calvo
- Jackie Kay
- José Restrepo
- Gustavo Angarita Jr.
- Laura Sher

== Production ==
In April 2011, it was reported that Christian Bale and Sean Penn were in talks to star in the film The Last Photograph, directed by Niels Arden Oplev and written by Kurt Johnstad from an original idea by Zack Snyder, who would also produce alongside his production partner Deborah Snyder. Dark Castle Entertainment was also in talks to take over the project as financier from Warner Bros. Pictures, who were now expected only to distribute the film, with production expected to begin in 2012 after Bale had completed filming on The Dark Knight Rises. In December 2016, it was reported that Snyder would now direct the project himself, after the delay of a planned sequel to Justice League (2017) provided him with an opening to film a smaller-scale production; by this time Bale and Penn were no longer attached and the rights had lapsed, with Gianni Nunnari negotiating a new deal to acquire them. In May 2021, Snyder revealed he had planned to film the project, now titled Horse Latitudes, on location in South America before delaying it indefinitely due to the severity of the COVID-19 pandemic in the region.

In August 2025, the project had been greenlit once again and had reverted to its original title, with Stuart Martin and Fra Fee joining the lead. In October 2025, Jackie Kay revealed that he had a role in the film.

=== Filming ===
Principal photography occurred in Iceland, Colombia, and Los Angeles, with Snyder himself serving as the cinematographer. During filming, Snyder contracted COVID-19. In November 2025, Snyder announced that principal photography had wrapped, thanking his international film crew.

=== Music ===
In August 2025, Hans Zimmer, a frequent collaborator of Snyder, alongside Omer Benyamin and Steven Doar were hired to compose the score.

== Release ==
The Last Photograph premiered at the 2026 Toronto International Film Festival on September 13.

=== Critical response ===
On the review aggregator website Rotten Tomatoes, 16% of 19 critics' reviews are positive, with an average rating of 3.50/10. Metacritic, which uses a weighted average, assigned the film a score of 16 out of 100, based on 7 critics, indicating "overwhelming dislike".

At its premiere, the film received negative reactions.
