= Jupiter Award (film award) =

German annual film and television award

- Awarded for: Excellence in Cinema
- Country: Germany
- First award: 1979
- Website: jupiter-award.de

The Jupiter Award is a German annual cinema award. It is Germany's biggest audience award for cinema and TV and is awarded annually by Cinema magazine and TV Spielfilm in eleven categories. The Jupiter Awards began in 1979.

== Ceremonies ==
=== 1st Jupiter Award / 1979 ===
Best Film: The Tin Drum, directed by Volker Schlöndorff	
Best Actor: Bud Spencer, for They Called Him Bulldozer; John Travolta, for Grease; Christopher Reeve, for Superman; Terence Hill, for Odds and Evens; Roger Moore, for The Wild Geese; Warren Beatty, for Heaven Can Wait; Burt Reynolds, for Hooper; Bruno Ganz, for Knife in the Head; Louis de Funès, for La Zizanie; Pierre Richard, for La Carapate	Best Actress: Nastassja Kinski, for Stay as You Are; Olivia Newton-John, for Grease; Sabine von Maydell, for Beware of Schwarzenbeck; Diane Keaton, for Interiors; Liv Ullmann, for Autumn Sonata; Brooke Shields, for Pretty Baby; Sophia Loren, for Brass Target; Faye Dunaway, for Eyes of Laura Mars; Jane Fonda, for Coming Home; Barbara Bach, for Force 10 from Navarone

=== 2nd Jupiter Award / 1980 ===
Best Film: The Jungle Book (1967), directed by Wolfgang Reitherman	
Best Actor: Bud Spencer, for I'm for the Hippopotamus; Roger Moore, for Moonraker; Terence Hill, for I'm for the Hippopotamus; Woody Allen, for Manhattan; Marlon Brando, for Apocalypse Now; Dustin Hoffman, for Kramer vs. Kramer; Jean-Paul Belmondo, for Cop or Hood; Ryan O'Neal, for The Main Event; Paul Newman, for Quintet; David Bennent, for The Tin Drum	Best Actress: Jane Fonda, for The China Syndrome; Nastassja Kinski, for Tess; Audrey Hepburn, for Bloodline; Olivia Pascal, for The Fruit is Ripe; Jacqueline Bisset, for Who Is Killing the Great Chefs of Europe?; Hanna Schygulla, for The Marriage of Maria Braun; Barbra Streisand, for The Main Event; Sigourney Weaver, for Alien; Barbara Bach, for The Humanoid; Sophia Loren, for Firepower

=== 3rd Jupiter Award / 1981 ===
Best Actor: Marius Müller-Westernhagen, for Theo Against the Rest of the World; Terence Hill, for Super Fuzz; Bud Spencer, for Flatfoot in Egypt; Robert De Niro, for Raging Bull; Roger Moore, for North Sea Hijack; Woody Allen, for Stardust Memories; Clint Eastwood, for Any Which Way You Can; Robert Redford, for Brubaker; Burt Reynolds, for Smokey and the Bandit II; Dustin Hoffman, for Kramer vs. Kramer	Best Actress: Brooke Shields, for The Blue Lagoon; Nastassja Kinski, for Tess; Kristy McNichol, for Little Darlings; Sydne Rome, for The Pumaman; Ornella Muti, for Flash Gordon; Tatum O'Neal, for Little Darlings; Hanna Schygulla, for Lili Marleen; Bo Derek, for 10; Carrie Fisher, for The Empire Strikes Back; Olivia Newton-John, for Xanadu

=== 4th Jupiter Award / 1982 ===
Best Film: Raiders of the Lost Ark, directed by Steven Spielberg; For Your Eyes Only, directed by John Glen; The Cannonball Run, directed by Hal Needham; Escape from New York, directed by John Carpenter; Das Boot, directed by Wolfgang Petersen; The Fox and the Hound, directed by Ted Berman, Richard Rich, Art Stevens; Christiane F. – We Children from Bahnhof Zoo, directed by Uli Edel; Excalibur, directed by John Boorman; Endless Love, directed by Franco Zeffirelli; Flash Gordon, directed by Mike Hodges	
Best Actor: Harrison Ford, for Raiders of the Lost Ark; Roger Moore, for For Your Eyes Only; Kurt Russell, for Escape from New York; Robert Redford, for Brubaker; Jean-Paul Belmondo, for The Professional; Bud Spencer, for Who Finds a Friend Finds a Treasure; Terence Hill, for Who Finds a Friend Finds a Treasure; Alain Delon, for Three Men to Kill; Burt Reynolds, for The Cannonball Run; Bruno Ganz, for Circle of Deceit	Best Actress: Brooke Shields, for Endless Love; Natja Brunckhorst, for Christiane F. – We Children from Bahnhof Zoo; Bo Derek, for Tarzan, the Ape Man; Désirée Nosbusch, for After Midnight; Carole Bouquet, for For Your Eyes Only; Nastassja Kinski, for Tess; Ornella Muti, for Flash Gordon; Jacqueline Bisset, for Rich and Famous; Kristy McNichol, for Little Darlings; Barbara Sukowa, for Lola

=== 5th Jupiter Award / 1983 ===
Best Film: E.T. the Extra-Terrestrial – Steven Spielberg; The Taming of the Scoundrel – Franco Castellano, Giuseppe Moccia; Blade Runner – Ridley Scott; Querelle – Rainer Werner Fassbinder; The Thing – John Carpenter; Rocky III – Sylvester Stallone; An American Werewolf in London – John Landis; Poltergeist – Tobe Hooper; The Professional – Georges Lautner; Mad Max 2 – George Miller	
Best Actor: Sylvester Stallone – Rocky III; Harrison Ford – Blade Runner; Adriano Celentano – The Taming of the Scoundrel; Mel Gibson – Mad Max 2; Roger Moore – For Your Eyes Only; Kurt Russell – The Thing; Dustin Hoffman – Kramer vs. Kramer; Jack Lemmon – Missing; Lewis Collins – Who Dares Wins; Jean-Paul Belmondo – Ace of Aces	Best Actress: Ornella Muti – The Taming of the Scoundrel; Nastassja Kinski – Cat People; Brooke Shields – Endless Love; Sissy Spacek – Missing; Jane Fonda – On Golden Pond; Romy Schneider – The Passerby; Meryl Streep – Sophie's Choice; Carole Bouquet – Bingo Bongo; Hanna Schygulla – Circle of Deceit; Désirée Nosbusch – Der Fan

=== 6th Jupiter Award / 1984 ===
Best Film: Return of the Jedi – Richard Marquand; First Blood – Ted Kotcheff; Gandhi – Richard Attenborough; Tootsie – Sydney Pollack; Flashdance – Adrian Lyne; An Officer and a Gentleman – Taylor Hackford; The Day After – Nicholas Meyer; Blue Thunder – John Badham; Trading Places – John Landis; Carmen – Carlos Saura	
Best Actor: Dustin Hoffman – Tootsie; Sylvester Stallone – First Blood; Richard Gere – An Officer and a Gentleman; Ben Kingsley – Gandhi; Eddie Murphy – Trading Places; Harrison Ford – Return of the Jedi; Jean-Paul Belmondo – Le Marginal; Mark Hamill – Return of the Jedi; David Bowie – Merry Christmas, Mr. Lawrence; Roger Moore – Octopussy	Best Actress: Jennifer Beals – Flashdance; Gudrun Landgrebe – A Woman in Flames; Jessica Lange – Frances; Meryl Streep – Sophie's Choice; Carrie Fisher – Return of the Jedi; Valérie Kaprisky – Breathless; Brooke Shields – Sahara; Laura del Sol – Carmen; Jamie Lee Curtis – Trading Places; Ornella Muti – The Girl from Trieste

=== 7th Jupiter Award / 1985 ===
Best Film: Indiana Jones and the Temple of Doom – Steven Spielberg; The NeverEnding Story – Wolfgang Petersen; Once Upon a Time in America – Sergio Leone; Gremlins – Joe Dante; Police Academy – Hugh Wilson; Dune – David Lynch; Yentl – Barbra Streisand; Terms of Endearment – James L. Brooks; Sudden Impact – Clint Eastwood; Romancing the Stone – Robert Zemeckis	
Best Actor: Harrison Ford – Indiana Jones and the Temple of Doom; Robert De Niro – Once Upon a Time in America; Clint Eastwood – Sudden Impact; Götz George – Abwärts; Michael Douglas – Romancing the Stone; Sean Connery – Never Say Never Again; Christopher Lambert – Greystoke; Jack Nicholson – Terms of Endearment; Lewis Collins – Code Name: Wild Geese; Tom Hulce – Amadeus	Best Actress: Isabelle Adjani – One Deadly Summer; Barbra Streisand – Yentl; Shirley MacLaine – Terms of Endearment; Kate Capshaw – Indiana Jones and the Temple of Doom; Kathleen Turner – Romancing the Stone; Meryl Streep – Silkwood; Daryl Hannah – Splash; Tami Stronach – The NeverEnding Story; Debra Winger – Terms of Endearment; Valérie Kaprisky – The Public Woman

=== 8th Jupiter Award / 1986 ===
Best Film: Back to the Future – Robert Zemeckis; Otto – Der Film – Xaver Schwarzenberger and Otto Waalkes; Rambo: First Blood Part II – George P. Cosmatos; Beverly Hills Cop – Martin Brest; Witness – Peter Weir; Enemy Mine – Wolfgang Petersen; Ghostbusters – Ivan Reitman; On the Killer's Track – Hajo Gies; The Killing Fields – Roland Joffé; The Terminator – James Cameron	
Best Actor: Michael J. Fox – Back to the Future; Götz George – On the Killer's Track; Sylvester Stallone – Rambo: First Blood Part II; Otto Waalkes – Otto – Der Film; Eddie Murphy – Beverly Hills Cop; Harrison Ford – Witness; Mel Gibson – Mad Max Beyond Thunderdome; Clint Eastwood – Pale Rider; Robert De Niro – Brazil; Steve Martin – All of Me	Best Actress: Jamie Lee Curtis – Perfect; Kelly Le Brock – Weird Science; Kathleen Turner – Prizzi's Honor; Meryl Streep – Falling in Love; Tina Turner – Mad Max Beyond Thunderdome; Cher – Mask; Grace Jones – A View to a Kill; Madonna – Desperately Seeking Susan; Kelly McGillis – Witness; Rosanna Arquette – Desperately Seeking Susan

=== 9th Jupiter Award / 1987 ===
Best Film: The Name of the Rose – Jean-Jacques Annaud; Top Gun – Tony Scott; Out of Africa – Sydney Pollack; Aliens – James Cameron; Men... – Doris Dörrie; Highlander – Russell Mulcahy; Extremities – Robert M. Young; Rocky IV – Sylvester Stallone; Short Circuit – John Badham; The Color Purple – Steven Spielberg	
Best Actor: Sean Connery – The Name of the Rose; Tom Cruise – Top Gun; Sylvester Stallone – Rocky IV; Robert Redford – Out of Africa; Christopher Lambert – Highlander; Dustin Hoffman – Death of a Salesman; William Hurt – Kiss of the Spider Woman; Michael Douglas – The Jewel of the Nile; Heiner Lauterbach – Men...; Uwe Ochsenknecht – Men...	Best Actress: Farrah Fawcett – Extremities; Meryl Streep – Out of Africa; Sigourney Weaver – Aliens; Kelly McGillis – Top Gun; Kathleen Turner – Peggy Sue Got Married; Kim Basinger – 9½ Weeks; Isabelle Adjani – Subway; Whoopi Goldberg – The Color Purple; Debra Winger – Legal Eagles; Ally Sheedy – Short Circuit

=== 10th Jupiter Award / 1988 ===
Best Film: Dirty Dancing – Emile Ardolino; Angel Heart – Alan Parker; Crocodile Dundee – Peter Faiman; The Untouchables – Brian De Palma; Platoon – Oliver Stone; Children of a Lesser God – Randa Haines; Stand by Me – Rob Reiner; The Living Daylights – John Glen; The Last Emperor – Bernardo Bertolucci; Full Metal Jacket – Stanley Kubrick	
Best Actor: Mickey Rourke – Angel Heart; Patrick Swayze – Dirty Dancing; Eddie Murphy – Beverly Hills Cop II; Paul Hogan – Crocodile Dundee; Jack Nicholson – The Witches of Eastwick; Timothy Dalton – The Living Daylights; Sylvester Stallone – Over the Top; Robert De Niro – The Untouchables; Sean Connery – The Untouchables; Götz George – The Cat	Best Actress: Kim Basinger – No Mercy; Marlee Matlin – Children of a Lesser God; Jennifer Grey – Dirty Dancing; Farrah Fawcett – Extremities; Kathleen Turner – Peggy Sue Got Married; Whoopi Goldberg – Jumpin' Jack Flash; Meryl Streep – Heartburn; Maryam d'Abo – The Living Daylights; Linda Kozlowski – Crocodile Dundee; Debra Winger – Black Widow

=== 11th Jupiter Award / 1989 ===
Best Film: Who Framed Roger Rabbit – Robert Zemeckis; Fatal Attraction – Adrian Lyne; Die Hard – John McTiernan; The Unbearable Lightness of Being – Philip Kaufman; No Way Out – Roger Donaldson; The Big Easy – Jim McBride; Rambo III – Peter MacDonald; Three Men and a Baby – Leonard Nimoy; Frantic – Roman Polanski; Ödipussi – Vicco von Bülow	
Best Actor: Michael Douglas – Fatal Attraction; Mickey Rourke – Barfly; Dennis Quaid – The Big Easy; Sean Connery – The Presidio; Harrison Ford – Frantic; Patrick Swayze – Dirty Dancing; Bruce Willis – Die Hard; Sylvester Stallone; Robert De Niro – Midnight Run; Kevin Costner – No Way Out	Best Actress: Sophie Marceau – Descente aux enfers; Cher – Moonstruck; Kelly McGillis – The Accused; Glenn Close – Fatal Attraction; Barbra Streisand – Nuts; Silvia Seidel – Anna; Meg Ryan – The Presidio; Jamie Lee Curtis – A Fish Called Wanda; Kathleen Turner – Switching Channels; Emily Lloyd – Wish You Were Here

=== 12th Jupiter Award / 1990 ===
Best Film: Rain Man – Barry Levinson; Indiana Jones and the Last Crusade – Steven Spielberg; A Fish Called Wanda – Charles Crichton; When Harry Met Sally... – Rob Reiner; Back to the Future Part II – Robert Zemeckis; Gorillas in the Mist – Michael Apted; Dangerous Liaisons – Stephen Frears; The Abyss – James Cameron; The Naked Gun – Zucker, Abrahams and Zucker; Black Rain – Ridley Scott	
Best Actor: Sean Connery – Indiana Jones and the Last Crusade; Dustin Hoffman – Rain Man; Harrison Ford – Indiana Jones and the Last Crusade; Tom Cruise – Rain Man; Mickey Rourke – Johnny Handsome; Jack Nicholson – Batman; Michael Douglas – Black Rain; Mel Gibson – Lethal Weapon; Michael J. Fox – Back to the Future Part II; Gene Hackman – Mississippi Burning	Best Actress: Sigourney Weaver – Gorillas in the Mist; Kim Basinger – Batman; Meg Ryan – When Harry Met Sally...; Jodie Foster – The Accused; Michelle Pfeiffer – Dangerous Liaisons; Sophie Marceau – L'Étudiante; Meryl Streep – Evil Angels; Jamie Lee Curtis – A Fish Called Wanda; Melanie Griffith – Working Girl; Ellen Barkin – Sea of Love

=== 13th Jupiter Award / 1991 ===
- Best International Film: Dead Poets Society, directed by Peter Weir
- Best International Director: Oliver Stone, for Born on the Fourth of July
- Best International Actor: Robin Williams, for Dead Poets Society
- Best International Actress: Julia Roberts, for Pretty Woman

=== 14th Jupiter Award / 1992 ===
- Best International Film: Dances with Wolves, directed by Kevin Costner
- Best International Director: Kevin Costner, for Dances with Wolves
- Best International Actor: Kevin Costner, for Dances with Wolves / Robin Hood: Prince of Thieves
- Best International Actress: Jodie Foster, for The Silence of the Lambs

=== 15th Jupiter Award / 1993 ===
- Best International Film: JFK, directed by Oliver Stone
- Best International Director: Oliver Stone, for JKF
- Best International Actor: Robert De Niro, for Cape Fear
- Best International Actress: Jodie Foster, for Little Man Tate

=== 16th Jupiter Award / 1994 ===
- Best International Film: Jurassic Park, directed by Steven Spielberg
- Best International Director: Steven Spielberg, for Jurassic Park
- Best International Actor: Clint Eastwood, for In the Line of Fire
- Best International Actress: Winona Ryder, for The Age of Innocence / Dracula / The House of the Spirits

=== 17th Jupiter Award / 1995 ===
- Best International Film: Schindler's List, directed by Steven Spielberg
- Best International Director: Steven Spielberg, for Schindler's List
- Best International Actor: Tom Hanks, for Forrest Gump
- Best International Actress: Sandra Bullock, for Speed

=== 18th Jupiter Award / 1996 ===
- Best International Film: Apollo 13, directed by Ron Howard
- Best International Director: Mel Gibson, for Braveheart
- Best International Actor: Johnny Depp, for Don Juan DeMarco
- Best International Actress: Sandra Bullock, for While You Were Sleeping

=== 19th Jupiter Award / 1997 ===
- Best International Film: Independence Day, directed by Roland Emmerich
- Best International Director: Roland Emmerich, for Independence Day
- Best International Actor: Nicolas Cage, for Leaving Las Vegas / The Rock
- Best International Actress: Sandra Bullock, for A Time to Kill / The Net

=== 20th Jupiter Award / 1998 ===
- Best International Film: Face/Off, directed by John Woo
- Best International Director: John Woo, for Face/Off
- Best International Actor: Nicolas Cage, for Con Air / Face/Off
- Best International Actress: Jodie Foster, for Contact

=== 21st Jupiter Award / 1999 ===
- Best International Film: Titanic, directed by James Cameron
- Best International Director: James Cameron, for Titanic
- Best International Actor: Jack Nicholson, for As Good as It Gets
- Best International Actress: Kate Winslet, for Titanic

=== 22nd Jupiter Award / 2000 ===
- Best International Film: The Matrix, directed by The Wachowskis
- Best International Director: The Wachowskis, for The Matrix
- Best International Actor: Edward Norton, for Fight Club
- Best International Actress: Gwyneth Paltrow, for Shakespeare in Love

=== 23rd Jupiter Award / 2001 ===
- Best International Film: American Beauty, directed by Sam Mendes
- Best International Director: Ridley Scott, for Gladiator
- Best International Actor: Kevin Spacey, for American Beauty
- Best International Actress: Julia Roberts, for Erin Brockovich
- Best German Actress: Franka Potente, for The Princess and the Warrior

=== 24th Jupiter Award / 2002 ===
- Best International Film: Shrek, directed by Andrew Adamson and Vicky Jenson
- Best International Director: Ridley Scott, for Hannibal
- Best International Actor: Tom Hanks, for Cast Away
- Best International Actress: Julia Roberts, for The Mexican
- Best German Actor: Moritz Bleibtreu, for Das Experiment
- Best German TV Film: The Tunnel, directed by Roland Suso Richter

=== 25th Jupiter Award / 2003 ===
- Best International Film: The Lord of the Rings: The Fellowship of the Ring, directed by Peter Jackson
- Best International Director: Peter Jackson, for The Lord of the Rings: The Fellowship of the Ring
- Best International Actor: Will Smith, for Ali
- Best International Actress: Halle Berry, for Monster's Ball

=== 26th Jupiter Award / 2004 ===
- Best International Film: The Lord of the Rings: The Return of the King, directed by Peter Jackson
- Best International Director: Peter Jackson, for The Lord of the Rings: The Return of the King
- Best International Actor: Johnny Depp, for Pirates of the Caribbean: The Curse of the Black Pearl
- Best International Actress: Nicole Kidman, for Cold Mountain

=== 27th Jupiter Award / 2005 ===
- Best International Film: The Day After Tomorrow, directed by Roland Emmerich
- Best International Director: Quentin Tarantino, for Kill Bill: Volume 2
- Best International Actor: Will Smith, for Hitch
- Best International Actress: Uma Thurman, for Kill Bill: Volume 1 / Kill Bill: Volume 2

=== 28th Jupiter Award / 2006 ===
- Best International Film: Million Dollar Baby, directed by Clint Eastwood
- Best International Director: Clint Eastwood, for Million Dollar Baby
- Best International Actor: Jamie Foxx, for Ray
- Best International Actress: Hilary Swank, for Million Dollar Baby
- Best German Film: Sophie Scholl – The Final Days, directed by Marc Rothemund
- Best German Director: Marc Rothemund, for Sophie Scholl – The Final Days
- Best German Actor: Benno Fürmann, for Joyeux Noël
- Best German Actress: Julia Jentsch, for Sophie Scholl – The Final Days
- Best German TV Film: Speer und Er, directed by Heinrich Breloer
- Best German TV Actor: Christoph Maria Herbst, for Stromberg
- Best German TV Actress: Marie Bäumer, for Ein toter Bruder
- Best DVD Release: Edison, directed by David J. Burke

=== 29th Jupiter Award / 2007 ===
- Best International Film: Casino Royale, directed by Martin Campbell
- Best International Director: Peter Jackson, for King Kong
- Best International Actor: Johnny Depp, for Pirates of the Caribbean: Dead Man's Chest
- Best International Actress: Audrey Tautou, for The Da Vinci Code
  - Meryl Streep, for The Devil Wears Prada
  - Anne Hathaway, for The Devil Wears Prada
- Best German Film: Perfume: The Story of a Murderer, directed by Tom Tykwer
- Best German Director: Tom Tykwer, for Perfume: The Story of a Murderer
- Best German Actor: Ulrich Mühe, for The Lives of Others
- Best German Actress: Martina Gedeck, for Atomised
- Best German TV Film: Dresden, directed by Roland Suso Richter
- Best German TV Actor: Benno Fürmann, for Storm Tide
- Best German TV Actress: Nadja Uhl, for Storm Tide
- Best DVD Release: The Jacket, directed by John Maybury

=== 30th Jupiter Award / 2008 ===
- Best International Film: Ratatouille, directed by Brad Bird and Jan Pinkava
- Best International Director: Paul Greengrass, for The Bourne Ultimatum
- Best International Actor: Johnny Depp, for Pirates of the Caribbean: At World's End
- Best International Actress: Jodie Foster, for The Brave One
  - Meryl Streep, for Mamma Mia!
  - Amanda Seyfried, for Mamma Mia!
- Best German Film: Neues vom Wixxer, directed by Cyrill Boss and Philipp Stennert
- Best German Director: Michael Herbig, for Lissi und der wilde Kaiser
- Best German Actor: Til Schweiger, for Where Is Fred?
- Best German Actress: Nina Hoss, for Yella
- Best German TV Film: Die Frau vom Checkpoint Charlie, directed by Miguel Alexandre
- Best German TV Actor: Heino Ferch, for Cold Summer
- Best German TV Actress: Maria Furtwängler, for March of Millions
- Best DVD Release: Lucky Number Slevin, directed by Paul McGuigan

=== 31st Jupiter Award / 2009 ===
- Best International Film: The Dark Knight, directed by Christopher Nolan
- Best International Director: Sean Penn, for Into the Wild
- Best International Actor: Heath Ledger, for The Dark Knight
- Best International Actress: Penélope Cruz, for Vicky Cristina Barcelona
- Best German Film: Rabbit Without Ears, directed by Til Schweiger
- Best German Director: Dennis Gansel, for The Wave
- Best German Actor: Jürgen Vogel, for The Wave
- Best German Actress: Nora Tschirner, for Rabbit Without Ears
- Best German TV Film: Ship of No Return: The Final Voyage of the Gustloff, directed by Joseph Vilsmaier
- Best German TV Actor: Michael Mendl, for Der Besuch der alten Dame
- Best German TV Actress: Anja Kling, for The Wall: The Final Days
- Best DVD Release: Watching the Detectives, directed by Paul Soter
- Lifetime Achievement Award: Volker Schlöndorff

=== 32nd Jupiter Award / 2010 ===
- Best International Film: Avatar, directed by James Cameron
- Best International Director: Quentin Tarantino, for Inglourious Basterds
- Best International Actor: Christoph Waltz, for Inglourious Basterds
- Best International Actress: Noomi Rapace, for The Girl with the Dragon Tattoo
  - Meryl Streep, for Doubt
  - Meryl Streep, for Julie & Julia
- Best German Film: Men in the City, directed by Simon Verhoeven
- Best German Director: Sönke Wortmann, for Pope Joan
- Best German Actor: David Kross, for Krabat
- Best German Actress: Johanna Wokalek, for Pope Joan
- Best German TV Film: 12 Winter, directed by Thomas Stiller
- Best German TV Actor: Matthias Schweighöfer, for The Author of Himself: The Life of Marcel Reich-Ranicki
- Best German TV Actress: Andrea Sawatzki, for Abducted
- Best DVD Release: The Illusionist, directed by Neil Burger
- Lifetime Achievement Award: Otto Waalkes

=== 33rd Jupiter Award / 2011 ===
- Best International Film: The Town, directed by Ben Affleck
- Best International Actor: Jeremy Renner, for The Town
- Best International Actress: Emily Blunt, for The Young Victoria
  - Meryl Streep, for It's Complicated
- Best German Film: Vincent Wants to Sea, directed by Ralf Huettner
- Best German Actor: Alexander Fehling, for Young Goethe in Love
- Best German Actress: Karoline Herfurth, for Vincent Wants to Sea
- Best German TV Film: Greed, directed by Dieter Wedel
- Best German TV Actor: Jan Josef Liefers and Axel Prahl, for Tatort
- Best German TV Actress: Nina Kunzendorf, for Until Nothing Remains
- Best International TV Series: True Blood, by Alan Ball
- Best German TV Series: Mord mit Aussicht, by Marie Reiners
- Lifetime Achievement Award: Hardy Krüger

=== 34th Jupiter Award / 2012 ===
Best International Film: Harry Potter and the Deathly Hallows – Part 2 – David Yates	Best German Film: What a Man – Matthias Schweighöfer
Best International Actor: George Clooney – The Ides of March; Orlando Bloom – The Three Musketeers; Christoph Waltz – The Green Hornet; Christoph Waltz – Water for Elephants; Johnny Depp – Pirates of the Caribbean: On Stranger Tides; Brad Pitt – The Tree of Life; Christoph Waltz – Carnage; Liam Neeson – Unknown; Matt Damon – Contagion; Harrison Ford – Cowboys & Aliens; Colin Firth – The King's Speech; Ben Affleck – The Company Men	Best International Actress: Cameron Diaz – Bad Teacher; Milla Jovovich – The Three Musketeers; Penélope Cruz – Pirates of the Caribbean: On Stranger Tides; Noomi Rapace – Sherlock Holmes: A Game of Shadows; Blake Lively – Green Lantern; Natalie Portman – Black Swan; Jodie Foster – Carnage; Diane Kruger – Unknown; Kate Winslet – Contagion; Helena Bonham Carter – The King's Speech; Julianne Moore – Crazy, Stupid, Love; Natalie Portman – Thor
Best German Actor: Til Schweiger – Kokowääh; Matthias Schweighöfer – What a Man; Til Schweiger – Men in the City 2; Olli Dittrich – Pigeons on the Roof; Jürgen Vogel – Hotel Lux; Florian Lukas – Anduni; Bruno Ganz – Colors in the Dark; Ludwig Trepte – What You Don't See; Benno Fürmann – Tom Sawyer; Fabian Busch – Gegengerade; Herbert Knaup – No More Mr. Ice Guy	Best German Actress: Hannah Herzsprung – Hell; Katja Riemann – Pigeons on the Roof; Nora Tschirner – The Crocodiles: All for One; Irina Potapenko – Anduni; Gudrun Landgrebe – Wunderkinder; Jella Haase – Lollipop Monster; Emma Schweiger – Kokowääh; Alice Dwyer – What You Don't See; Natalia Avelon – Gegengerade; Heike Makatsch – Tom Sawyer; Elke Winkens – No More Mr. Ice Guy
Best German TV Actor: Christoph Maria Herbst – Stromberg; Christoph Bach – Carlos; Ulrich Tukur – Tatort (Episode: Unter Verdacht); Ulrich Tukur – Tatort (Episode: Das Dorf); Matthias Habich – Bloch (Episode: Der Heiland); Max Riemelt – Schandmal – Der Tote im Berg; Florian David Fitz – Doctor's Diary; Ulrich Noethen – Von Mäusen und Lügen; Götz George – Papa allein zu Haus; Benno Fürmann – Der Mauerschütze; Maximilian Brückner – Die Route; Dietmar Bär – Never Again	Best German TV Actress: Diana Amft – Doctor's Diary; Yvonne Catterfeld – The Girl at the Bottom of the Sea; Franka Potente – Beate Uhse; Katharina Böhm – Murder in the Best Family; Annette Frier – Danni Lowinski; Jördis Triebel – A Good Summer; Anja Kling – It's Not Over; Christiane Paul – Der Verdacht; Inka Friedrich – Never Again; Annika Kuhl – Der Mauerschütze; Luna Mijović – Dreileben; Anna Bullard-Werner – Tatort (Episode: Zwischen den Ohren)
Best German TV Film: Men Are Wired One Way, Women Another – Rolf Silber	Best German TV Series: Danni Lowinski
Best International TV Series: How I Met Your Mother	Lifetime Achievement Award: Maximilian Schell

=== 35th Jupiter Award / 2013 ===
- Best International Film:
  - Skyfall, directed by Sam Mendes
  - Ted, directed by Seth MacFarlane
- Best International Actor: Tommy Lee Jones, for Hope Springs
- Best International Actress: Diane Kruger, for Farewell, My Queen
  - Meryl Streep, for Hope Springs
  - Meryl Streep, for The Iron Lady
- Best German Film: Jesus Loves Me, directed by Florian David Fitz
- Best German Actor: Elyas M'Barek, for Heiter bis Wolkig
- Best German Actress: Luna Schweiger, for Guardians
- Best German TV Film: The Tower, directed by Christian Schwochow
- Best German TV Actor: Ronald Zehrfeld, for The Invisible Girl
- Best German TV Actress: Maria Furtwängler, for Tatort: Wegwerfmädchen
- Best International TV Series: Two and a Half Men
- Best German TV Series: Crime Scene Cleaner
- Lifetime Achievement Award: Jürgen Prochnow

=== 36th Jupiter Award / 2014 ===
Best International Film: Gravity – Alfonso Cuarón; Beautiful Creatures – Richard LaGravenese; Captain Phillips – Paul Greengrass; Les Misérables – Tom Hooper; The Hobbit: The Desolation of Smaug – Peter Jackson; Man of Steel – Zack Snyder; Hitchcock – Sacha Gervasi; Elysium – Neill Blomkamp; Django Unchained – Quentin Tarantino; Inside Llewyn Davis – Joel Coen and Ethan Coen; Red 2 – Dean Parisot; Despicable Me 2 – Pierre Coffin; Iron Man 3 – Shane Black	Best German Film: Fack ju Göhte – Bora Dağtekin; Two Lives – Judith Kaufmann and Georg Maas; Break Up Man – Matthias Schweighöfer and Torsten Künstler; Kokowääh 2 – Til Schweiger and Torsten Künstler; Life Is Not for Cowards – André Erkau; Finsterworld – Frauke Finsterwalder; The Girl with Nine Wigs – Marc Rothemund; Adieu Paris – Franziska Buch; Quality Time – Holger Haase; Parents – Robert Thalheim; Buddy – Michael Herbig; Frau Ella – Markus Goller
Best International Actor: Channing Tatum – White House Down; Ray Winstone – The Sweeney; Michael Shannon – Man of Steel; Steve Carell – The Incredible Burt Wonderstone; Anthony Hopkins – Hitchcock; Idris Elba – Pacific Rim; Zach Galifianakis – The Hangover Part III; Michael Douglas – Behind the Candelabra; Jean Dujardin – Möbius; Christoph Waltz – Django Unchained; Joseph Gordon-Levitt – Don Jon	Best International Actress: Sandra Bullock – Gravity; Emma Thompson – Beautiful Creatures; Isla Fisher – The Great Gatsby; Anne Hathaway – Les Misérables; Chloë Grace Moretz – Carrie; Amy Adams – Man of Steel; Jennifer Lawrence – Silver Linings Playbook; Helen Mirren – Hitchcock; Mia Wasikowska – Stoker; Cate Blanchett – Blue Jasmine; Emma Watson – The Bling Ring; Glenn Close – Albert Nobbs
Best German Actor: Wotan Wilke Möhring – Life Is Not for Cowards; Max Riemelt – Free Fall; Armin Rohde – The White Horse Inn; Uwe Kockisch – Ruby Red; Daniel Brühl – Rush; Olli Dittrich – King Ordinary; Matthias Schweighöfer – Break Up Man; Hans Werner Meyer – Adieu Paris; Samuel Finzi – Kokowääh 2; Alexander Fehling – Buddy; August Diehl – Frau Ella; Charly Hübner – Parents	Best German Actress: Ruth Maria Kubitschek – Frau Ella; Diana Amft – The White Horse Inn; Nadja Uhl – Break Up Man; Christiane Paul – Parents; Rosalie Thomass – Life Is Not for Cowards; Diane Kruger – A Perfect Plan; Jessica Schwarz – Adieu Paris; Anne Ratte-Polle – Everyday Objects; Juliane Köhler – Two Lives; Corinna Harfouch – Finsterworld; Lisa Tomaschewsky – The Girl with Nine Wigs; Mina Tander – Buddy
Best German TV Actor: Charly Hübner – Polizeiruf 110; Dieter Hallervorden – Live Is Life 2; Dieter Pfaff – Bloch; Matthias Brandt – Eine verhängnisvolle Nacht; Henning Baum – Der letzte Bulle; Christoph Schechinger – Kleine Schiffe; Tom Schilling – Generation War; Fritz Karl – Among Enemies; Heio von Stetten – Der Kaktus; Tobias Moretti – Mobbing; Götz George – George; Jan Fedder – Stille	Best German TV Actress: Ruby O. Fee – Tatort: Happy Birthday, Sarah!; Diana Amft – Christine. Perfekt war gestern!; Brigitte Hobmeier – Wer hat Angst vorm weißen Mann?; Senta Berger – Welcome to the Countryside!; Emilia Schüle – Striving for Freedom; Annette Frier – Danni Lowinski; Katharina Böhm – The End of Lies; Martina Gedeck – Blank; Anna Loos – The Woman from the Past; Nina Hoss – Summer Window; Adele Neuhauser – Tatort; Andrea Sawatzki – A Royal Affair
Best German TV Film: Generation War – Philipp Kadelbach; Wer hat Angst vorm weißen Mann? – Wolfgang Murnberger; Hotel Adlon: A Family Saga – Uli Edel; Willkommen im Club – Oliver Schmitz; Tatort: Spiel auf Zeit – Roland Suso Richter; Night Over Berlin – Friedemann Fromm; Kleine Schiffe – Matthias Steurer; Polizeiruf 110: Zwischen den Welten – René Heisig; Der Kaktus – Franziska Buch; Grenzgang – Brigitte Maria Bertele; Tatort: Feuerteufel – Özgür Yıldırım; George – Joachim A. Lang	Best German TV Series: Der letzte Bulle; Alarm für Cobra 11 – Die Autobahnpolizei; Borgia; Bully macht Buddy
Best International TV Series: Game of Thrones	Lifetime Achievement Award: Dieter Hallervorden

=== 37th Jupiter Award / 2015 ===
Best International Film: X-Men: Days of Future Past – Bryan Singer	Best German Film: Head Full of Honey – Til Schweiger
Best International Actor: Chris Pratt – Guardians of the Galaxy	Best International Actress: Keira Knightley – Begin Again; Felicity Jones – The Theory of Everything; Meryl Streep – August: Osage County; Helena Bonham Carter – The Young and Prodigious T.S. Spivet; Jessica Chastain – Interstellar; Uma Thurman – Nymphomaniac; Jennifer Lawrence – X-Men: Days of Future Past; Naomie Harris – Mandela: Long Walk to Freedom; Scarlett Johansson – Lucy; Eva Green – Sin City: A Dame to Kill For; Kate Hudson – Wish I Was Here; Amy Adams – American Hustle
Best German Actor: Florian David Fitz – Tour de Force; Elyas M'Barek – Who Am I; Jürgen Vogel – Stereo; Alexander Fehling – Labyrinth of Lies; Heiner Lauterbach – Wir sind die Neuen; Matthias Schweighöfer – Joy of Fatherhood; Jannis Niewöhner – Everything Is Love; Moritz Bleibtreu – Not My Day; Fahri Yardım – Therapy Crashers; Florian Stetter – Beloved Sisters; Friedrich Mücke – Everything Is Love; Axel Prahl – The Whole Shebang	Best German Actress: Maria Ehrich – Sapphire Blue; Marianne Sägebrecht – Pettson & Findus: Fun Stuff; Karoline Herfurth – The Pasta Detectives; Julia Koschitz – Tour de Force; Nina Hoss – Phoenix; Liv Lisa Fries – Zurich; Maria Kwiatkowsky – The Invention of Love; Hannah Herzsprung – Beloved Sisters; Katharina Schüttler – Everything Is Love; Peri Baumeister – Therapy Crashers; Karoline Schuch – Hanna's Journey; Jessica Schwarz – Der Koch
Best German TV Actor: Bjarne Mädel – Crime Scene Cleaner (Der Tatortreiniger); Ken Duken – Dr. Gressmann zeigt Gefühle; Antoine Monot, Jr. – Ein Fall für zwei; Florian Lukas – We Did It for the Money; Max Hegewald – Wenn es am schönsten ist; Jacob Matschenz – Till Eulenspiegel; Tobias Moretti – The Witness House; Harald Krassnitzer – Tatort; Felix Klare – Momentversagen; Matthias Brandt – A Faithful Husband; Jörg Hartmann – Tatort; Heino Ferch – Sarajevo	Best German TV Actress: Annette Frier – Danni Lowinski; Stefanie Stappenbeck – Mit Burnout durch den Wald; Lisa Wagner – Kommissarin Heller: Tod am Weiher; Corinna Harfouch – Der Fall Bruckner; Katharina Schüttler – Stille Nächte; Diana Amft – We Did It for the Money; Julia Jentsch – The Chosen Ones; Aylin Tezel – Breaking Horizons; Tessa Mittelstaedt – Tatort; Rosalie Thomass – The Witness House; Nadine Kösters – Tatort: Ohnmacht; Anna Loos – Helen Dorn
Best German TV Film: Die Pilgerin – Philipp Kadelbach

=== 38th Jupiter Award / 2016 ===
Best International Film: Star Wars: The Force Awakens – J. J. Abrams; Mad Max: Fury Road – George Miller; Mission: Impossible – Rogue Nation – Christopher McQuarrie; Everest – Baltasar Kormákur; Sicario – Denis Villeneuve; Still Alice – Richard Glatzer and Wash West; Spectre – Sam Mendes; Ant-Man – Peyton Reed; Fury – David Ayer; American Sniper – Clint Eastwood; Jurassic World – Colin Trevorrow; Furious 7 – James Wan	Best German Film: Fack ju Göhte 2 – Bora Dağtekin; The Manny – Matthias Schweighöfer and Torsten Künstler; The Lies of the Victors – Christoph Hochhäusler; The People vs. Fritz Bauer – Lars Kraume; Frau Müller muss weg! – Sönke Wortmann; I'm Off Then – Julia von Heinz; Beck's Last Summer – Frieder Wittich; Windstorm 2 – Katja von Garnier; Highway to Hellas – Aron Lehmann; Der 8. Kontinent – Serdar Dogan; Traumfrauen – Anika Decker; Boy 7 – Özgür Yıldırım
Best International Actor: Michael Fassbender – Steve Jobs; Robert De Niro – The Intern; Benicio del Toro – Sicario; Brad Pitt – By the Sea; Jake Gyllenhaal – Southpaw; Chris Hemsworth – Avengers: Age of Ultron; Michael Keaton – Birdman; Paul Rudd – Ant-Man; Oscar Isaac – A Most Violent Year; Bradley Cooper – American Sniper; Tom Hardy – Mad Max: Fury Road; Ryan Reynolds – Woman in Gold	Best International Actress: Reese Witherspoon – Wild; Meryl Streep – Into the Woods; Anne Hathaway – The Intern; Emma Stone – Irrational Man; Emily Blunt – Sicario; Jennifer Aniston – She's Funny That Way; Charlize Theron – Mad Max: Fury Road; Cate Blanchett – Carol; Emilia Clarke – Terminator Genisys; Hilary Swank – You're Not You; Julianne Moore – Still Alice; Helen Mirren – Woman in Gold

=== 39th Jupiter Award / 2017 ===
Best International Film: Independence Day: Resurgence – Roland Emmerich; The Hateful Eight – Quentin Tarantino; Deadpool – Tim Miller; Batman v Superman: Dawn of Justice – Zack Snyder; Captain America: Civil War – Anthony Russo and Joe Russo; X-Men: Apocalypse – Bryan Singer; The Nice Guys – Shane Black; Suicide Squad – David Ayer; The Magnificent Seven – Antoine Fuqua; The Accountant – Gavin O'Connor; Deepwater Horizon – Peter Berg; Rogue One: A Star Wars Story – Gareth Edwards	Best German Film: Welcome to Germany – Simon Verhoeven; The Dark Side of the Moon – Stephan Rick; The Most Beautiful Day – Florian David Fitz; Sex & Crime – Paul Florian Müller; A Hologram for the King – Tom Tykwer; Too Hard to Handle – Laura Lackmann; Agnes – Johannes Schmid; Toni Erdmann – Maren Ade; Schweinskopf al dente – Ed Herzog; SMS für Dich – Karoline Herfurth; Heart of Stone – Johannes Naber; Vier gegen die Bank – Wolfgang Petersen
Best International Actor: Denzel Washington – The Magnificent Seven; Sylvester Stallone – Creed; Ryan Reynolds – Deadpool; Chris Hemsworth – The Huntsman: Winter's War; Tom Hanks – A Hologram for the King; Casey Affleck – Triple 9; Russell Crowe – The Nice Guys; Chris Pine – Star Trek Beyond; Jared Leto – Suicide Squad; Ben Affleck – The Accountant; Mark Wahlberg – Deepwater Horizon; Brad Pitt – Allied	Best International Actress: Mila Kunis – Bad Moms; Alicia Vikander – The Danish Girl; Emma Watson – Colonia; Julianne Moore – Freeheld; Scarlett Johansson – Captain America: Civil War; Julia Roberts – Money Monster; Emilia Clarke – Me Before You; Margot Robbie – The Legend of Tarzan; Blake Lively – The Shallows; Felicity Jones – Inferno; Meryl Streep – Florence Foster Jenkins; Amy Adams – Nocturnal Animals

=== 40th Jupiter Award / 2018 ===
Best International Film: Dunkirk – Christopher Nolan; La La Land – Damien Chazelle; Fifty Shades Darker – James Foley; Moonlight – Barry Jenkins; Guardians of the Galaxy Vol. 2 – James Gunn; Pirates of the Caribbean: Dead Men Tell No Tales – Joachim Rønning, Espen Sandberg; Wonder Woman – Patty Jenkins; War for the Planet of the Apes – Matt Reeves; It – Andy Muschietti; Blade Runner 2049 – Denis Villeneuve; Detroit – Kathryn Bigelow; Star Wars: The Last Jedi – Rian Johnson	Best German Film: Fack ju Göhte 3 – Bora Dagtekin; My Blind Date with Life – Marc Rothemund; Timm Thaler oder Das verkaufte Lachen – Andreas Dresen; Wild Mouse – Josef Hader; Bye Bye Germany – Sam Garbarski; 5 Frauen – Olaf Kraemer; Sommerfest – Sönke Wortmann; Windstorm 3: Windstorm and the Wild Horses – Katja von Garnier; Godless Youth – Alain Gsponer; High Society – Anika Decker; In the Fade – Fatih Akin; This Crazy Heart – Marc Rothemund
Best International Actor: Dwayne "The Rock" Johnson – Baywatch; Ryan Gosling – La La Land; Dev Patel – Lion; Jamie Foxx – Sleepless; Dave Bautista – Guardians of the Galaxy Vol. 2; Johnny Depp – Pirates of the Caribbean: Dead Men Tell No Tales; Tom Hardy – Dunkirk; Ryan Reynolds – The Hitman's Bodyguard; Bill Skarsgård – It; Chris Hemsworth – Thor: Ragnarok; Ben Affleck – Justice League; Idris Elba – The Mountain Between Us	Best International Actress: Gal Gadot – Wonder Woman; Emma Stone – La La Land; Isabelle Huppert – Elle; Emma Watson – Beauty and the Beast; Charlize Theron – Fast & Furious 8; Annette Bening – 20th Century Women; Jessica Chastain – Miss Sloane; Brie Larson – The Glass Castle; Cate Blanchett – Thor: Ragnarok; Amy Adams – Justice League; Daisy Ridley – Star Wars: The Last Jedi

== See also ==
- Cinema of Germany
- List of German films
