= Conni & Co =

2016 German children's film

- Theatrical release poster
- Directed by: Franziska Buch
- Written by: Vanessa Walder
- Produced by: Christian Popp; Siegfried Kamml
- Starring: Emma Schweiger; Heino Ferch; Iris Berben; Ken Duken
- Cinematography: Konstantin Kröning
- Edited by: Andrea Mertens
- Music by: Youki Yamamoto; Martin Todsharow
- Production companies: Producers at Work; Barefoot Films; Warner Bros. Film Productions Germany
- Distributed by: Warner Bros. Pictures
- Release date: 18 August 2016
- Running time: 104 minutes
- Country: Germany
- Language: German
- Box office: $2.6 million

Conni & Co is a 2016 German children's film directed by Franziska Buch, based on the German book series published by Carlsen Verlag.

== Cast ==
- Emma Schweiger as Conni
- Oskar Keymer as Paul
- Heino Ferch as Direktor Möller
- Ken Duken as Jürgen Klawitter
- Lisa Bitter as Annette Klawitter
- Iris Berben as Oma Marianne
- Anneke Kim Sarnau as Frau Lindmann
- Ben Knobbe as Jakob
- Sofia Bolotina as Janette
- Til Schweiger as Chief
- Kurt Krömer as Zoofachverkäufer
- Joone Dankou as Saskia
