= Tijan Marei =

German actress

Tijan Marei (born 1996 in Berlin) is a German actress. She made her debut as a child actress in 2007 and has appeared regularly in German and international television series and film productions since 2013.

Marei's mother is German, her father has Circassian ancestors. When she was ten, a casting director at the Bundesjugendspiele became aware of her and she took on a small role alongside Anna Loos in the ZDF television film The Echo of Guilt.

After graduating from high school, she completed a short yoga teacher training course in Goa, India, at the age of 18. She then did a two-year yoga course in Berlin. She also began studying fine arts at the Berlin University of the Arts.

Marei received her first leading role in 2017 in the ARD production Ellas Baby, directed by David Dietl. In the film, she plays a 16-year-old schoolgirl who accidentally becomes pregnant during a school exchange in France. For her performance, she was nominated for Best Actress at the Hessian Film Awards. In 2019, she played the title role in a film adaptation of'Snow White. In 2020 she took on the role of Gretel in the British drama film Six Minutes to Midnight.

In 2020, shooting began for the film The Salvation of The World as We Know It by Til Schweiger, in which Marei played a leading role. In 2021, filming was completed for the Netflix horror film The Privilege, directed by Felix Fuchssteiner and Katharina Schöde. In the same year she shot, also for Netflix, Rumspringa, directed by Mira Thiel.
