= Dana Schweiger =

American television personality and businesswoman

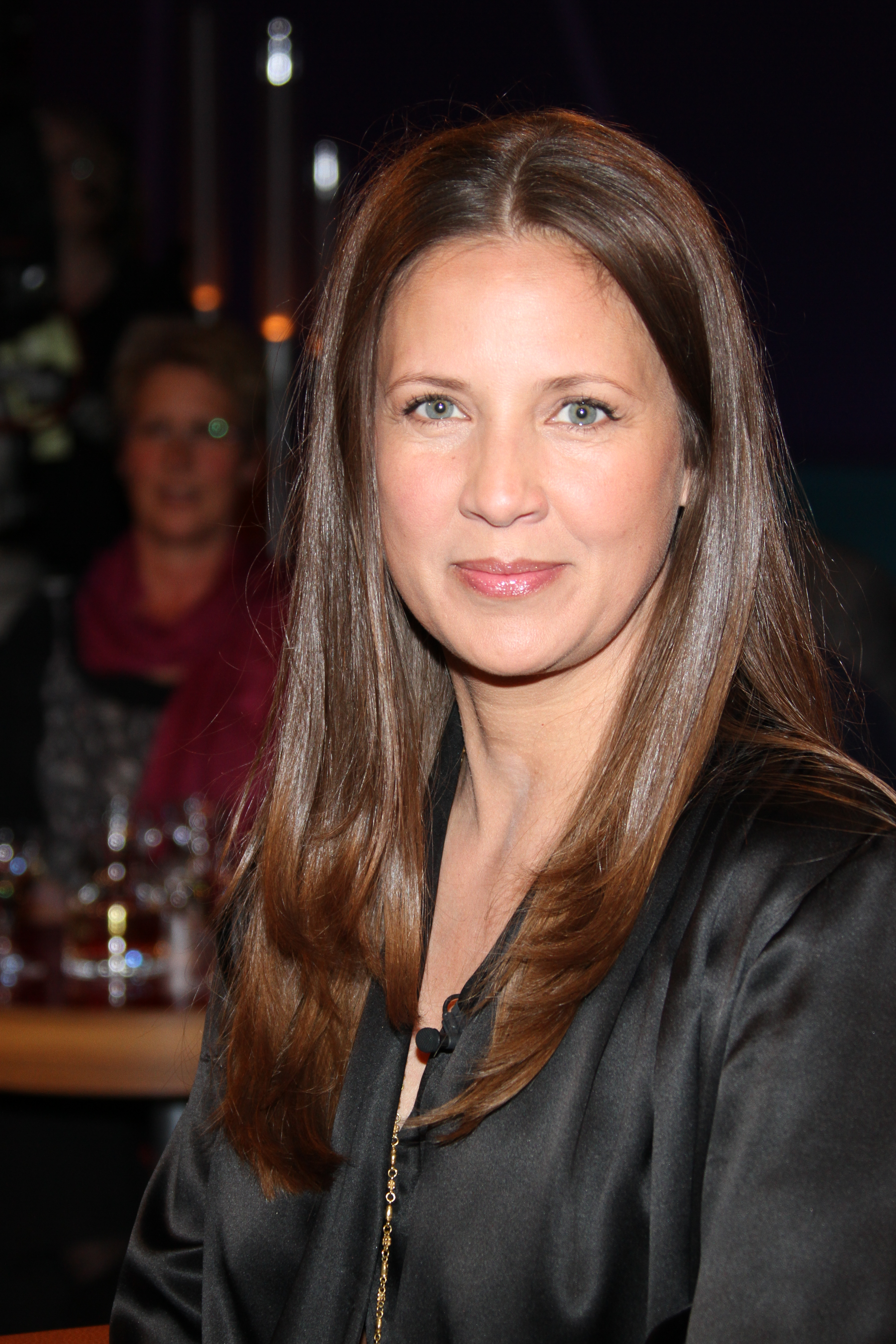
- Schweiger in 2012
- Born: Dana Carlsen; February 29, 1968 (age 57); Seattle, Washington, U.S.
- Occupations: Television personality, entrepreneur, model
- Spouse: Til Schweiger (m. 1995; div. 2014)
- Children: Valentin Schweiger; Luna Schweiger; Lilli Schweiger; Emma Tiger Schweiger

Dana Schweiger (née Carlsen; born February 29, 1968) is an American television personality, entrepreneur and a former model.

== Early life ==
Dana Schweiger was born in Seattle, Washington. She grew up there with her sister and her uncle.

== Career ==
Schweiger first studied business management and was later educated at the Esthetic Skincare Institute in Seattle as a beautician. In the 1990s, she worked for Calvin Klein and H&M as a model. In 2009, she signed an advertising contract with Katjes. In 2012, she was part of the jury of Deutschland sucht den Superstar - Kids. She is the co-founder of Bellybutton, a mail order company for children's supplies. Since 2021, Schweiger is ambassador of WW.

== Personal life ==
Schweiger married actor Til Schweiger on June 19, 1995. They have four children: Valentin Florian Schweiger (b. 1995), Luna Marie Schweiger (b. 1997), Lilli Camille Schweiger (b. 1998), and Emma Tiger Schweiger (b. 2002). Dana and Til Schweiger separated in 2005 and were divorced in 2014.

In July 2016, Schweiger's 19 year old daughter Luna Schweiger publicly announced that she would renounce her American citizenship if Donald Trump won the US presidential election in November that year. Schweiger herself concurred with that idea.

== Filmography ==
- 1995: Lindenstraße
- 1997: Knockin' on Heaven's Door
- 1998: The Polar Bear
- 2004: Pampers-TV (RTL II), 9 Sendungen
- 2005: Barfuss
- 2012: Simply Dana (Glitz*)
- 2012: Deutschland sucht den Superstar - Kids (RTL)
- 2015: Grill den Henssler (VOX)
- 2016: Dance Dance Dance (RTL)
- 2016: 6 Mütter: Zwischen Kind und Karriere
