= Tschiller: Off Duty =

2016 German action film by Christian Alvart

- Theatrical release poster
- Directed by: Christian Alvart
- Written by: Christoph Darnstädt
- Produced by: Christian Alvart; Siegfried Kamml; Tom Zickler; Til Schweiger
- Starring: Til Schweiger; Fahri Yardım; Özgür Emre Yıldırım; Luna Schweiger
- Cinematography: Christof Wahl
- Edited by: Marc Hofmeister; Dirk Grau
- Music by: Martin Todsharow
- Production companies: Syrreal Entertainment; Barefoot Films; Norddeutscher Rundfunk; Warner Bros. Film Productions Germany
- Distributed by: Warner Bros. Pictures
- Release date: 4 February 2016
- Running time: 140 minutes
- Country: Germany
- Language: German
- Box office: $2.9 million

Tschiller: Off Duty is a 2016 German action film directed by Christian Alvart. Set in the Tatort universe, the film is a theatrical sequel to the episode Tatort: Fegefeuer.

== Cast ==
- Til Schweiger as Niklas "Nick" Tschiller
- Fahri Yardım as Yalcin Gümer
- Özgür Emre Yıldırım as Süleyman Şeker
- Luna Schweiger as Lenny Tschiller
- Erdal Yıldız as Firat Astan
- Alyona Konstantinova as Dascha
- Eduard Flerov as Semjon Assinowitsch
- Berrak Tüzünataç as Reyhan
- Jewgeni Sidichin as Alexander Kinskij
