= Luna Schweiger =

German actress (born 1997)

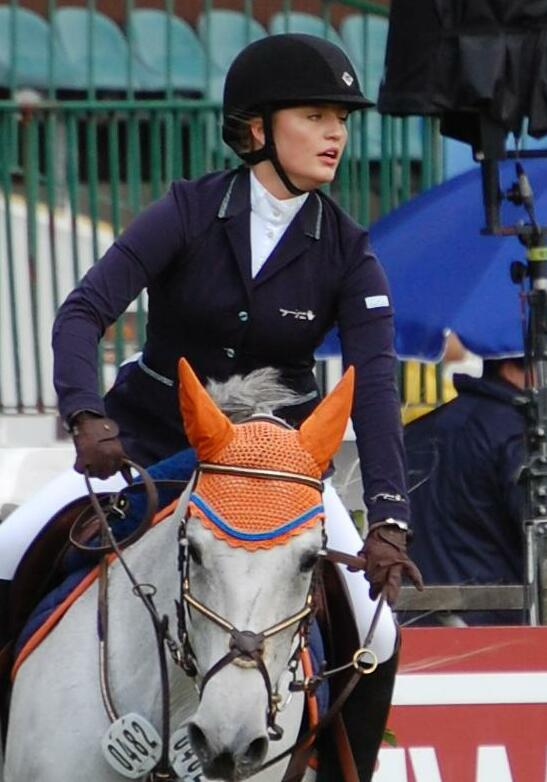
- Schweiger in 2015
- Born: Luna Marie Schweiger; 11 January 1997 (age 29); Berlin, Germany
- Citizenship: Germany; United States
- Occupation: Actress
- Years active: 2007–present
- Parents: Til Schweiger (father); Dana Carlsen (mother)
- Relatives: Valentin Schweiger (brother); Lilli Schweiger (sister); Emma Tiger Schweiger (sister)

Luna Marie Schweiger (born 11 January 1997) is a German actress who also formerly held American citizenship. She is best known for her role in the 2007 film Keinohrhasen and its 2009 sequel Zweiohrküken, directed by her father Til Schweiger.

== Family ==
Schweiger was born on 11 January 1997 in Berlin to German actor Til Schweiger and American fashion model Dana Carlsen. She is the second of four children, after Valentin (born 1995), and the eldest daughter, before Lilli (born 1998) and Emma (born 2002). All four of them are child actors, having all first appeared in the 2007 film Keinohrhasen and its 2009 sequel Zweiohrküken, directed by their father. Her parents separated in 2005. Schweiger now lives with her mother in Hamburg.

== Career ==
Schweiger made her film debut as young Anna Gotzlowski in Keinohrhasen (2007), co–starring Nora Tschirner and her father Til Schweiger, who also directed the film, and reprised her role in its 2009 sequel, Zweiohrküken. In 2009, she portrayed the role of Sarah in the drama Phantom Pain, starring Til Schweiger, Jana Pallaske and Stipe Erceg. Schweiger briefly appeared in the 2011 film Kokowääh, starring her father and sister Emma Tiger Schweiger. In 2012, she played a teenager in Schutzengel named Nina who witnessed the death of her boyfriend. In witness protection her guardian Max, played by Til Schweiger, protects her.

== Filmography ==
Year	Title	Role	Notes
2007	Keinohrhasen	Young Anna Gotzlowski	
2009	Phantom Pain	Sarah	
2009	Zweiohrküken	Young Anna Gotzlowski	
2011	Kokowääh	Girl in the Supermarket	
2011	Die Pfotenbande	Herself	12 episodes; German Boomerang TV show, along with her sisters Lilli and Emma
2012	Guardians	Nina	
2013	Kokowääh 2	daughter	
2017	Tschiller: Off Duty	Lenny Tschiller	
2023	Manta, Manta: Legacy	Mücke	
2024	Broke. Alone. A Kinky Love Story	Helga Schnabel	
