= The Salvation of the World as We Know It =

The Salvation of The World as We Know It
- Theatrical release poster
- Directed by: Til Schweiger
- Written by: Lo Malinke; Til Schweiger
- Produced by: Til Schweiger; Christian Specht
- Starring: Emilio Sakraya; Til Schweiger; Tijan Marei; Bettina Lamprecht; Emily Cox; Emma Schweiger
- Cinematography: René Richter
- Edited by: Til Schweiger; Alexander Menkö; Constantin von Seld
- Music by: Martin Todsharow
- Production companies: Barefoot Films; Warner Bros. Film Productions Germany; Erfttal Film; Perathon Film
- Distributed by: Warner Bros. Pictures
- Release date: 11 November 2021
- Running time: 135 minutes
- Country: Germany
- Language: German
- Box office: $409,022

The Salvation of The World as We Know It (German: Die Rettung der uns bekannten Welt) is a 2021 German comedy-drama film written, produced, directed, edited and starring Til Schweiger.

The film was released in Germany on 11 November 2021 by Warner Bros. Pictures.

== Cast ==
- Emilio Sakraya as Paul
- Til Schweiger as Hardy
- Tijan Marei as Toni
- Bettina Lamprecht as Anni
- Emily Cox as Katharina
- Emma Schweiger as Winnie
- Herbert Knaup as Stetter
