= Dirk Reichardt =

German composer

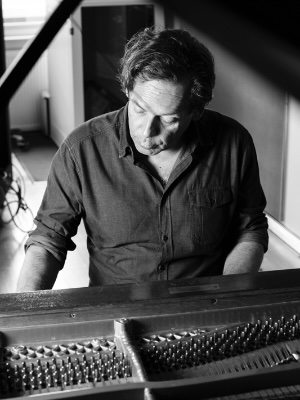
- Dirk Reichardt at the piano in his studio in 2024

Background information
- Born: September 9, 1964 (age 61); Oldenburg in Holstein, West Germany
- Occupations: Composer, producer, sound designer
- Instrument: Keyboards
- Years active: 1980s–present
- Website: jamxmusic.com/en/

Dirk Reichardt (born September 9, 1964) is a German composer, sound designer, jingle producer and pioneer in the field of curative or medico-functional music. He is also the founder and managing director of the Hamburg-based production company jamXmusic, specializing in acoustic brand management and sound branding.

== Early life ==
Dirk Reichardt discovered his love of the piano at a very early age. After many years of private instruction, teaching himself the drums and a number of early band projects, Reichardt finished secondary school in 1985 in Kiel (Germany). Later, while studying business administration in London, he worked as a keyboardist and assistant in a recording studio.

== Career ==
In 1987, Reichardt took his first full-time studio job as an arranger in Hamburg. For a short time, he also played keyboards in the band Fex. In the 1990s, quickly making a name for himself in the German music and media landscape, Reichardt established himself as a sought-after keyboardist, arranger, composer, and music producer. As a studio keyboardist, he has worked with a variety of artists including Dieter Bohlen, Blue System, Bonnie Tyler, Dionne Warwick, Roy Black, Fun Factory, and Nana, and has co-produced with Danny Shogger and David Parker (Taco). At the same time, he worked as an independent producer for radio stations in Germany and throughout Europe.

In 1998, Reichardt founded the music production company jamXmusic gmbh, with whom he has produced over 100 jingle packages produced for 75 radio stations in Europe and the USA. jamXmusic is one of the most successful German music production companies in this market.

In 2004, Reichardt gained recognition as a film composer. Alongside his co-composers Stefan Hansen and Max Berghaus, Reichardt received the German Film Award in Gold for Best Film Music for Erbsen auf halb 6 (Peas at Half Past Six).

Over time, Reichardt forged a long-standing creative partnership with German actor, film director, and producer Til Schweiger. Together, they crafted the soundtracks for iconic German blockbusters such as Barefoot, Rabbit Without Ears (Keinohrhasen), Rabbit Without Ears 2 (Zweiohrküken), Kokowääh, and Head Full of Honey (Honig im Kopf).

The Rabbit Without Ears original soundtrack became the first and, so far, only German film soundtrack to achieve platinum status for over 200,000 CDs sold in Germany. Reichardt's piano compositions "A Rainy Day in Vancouver" and "Emma/Leila’s Theme" rank among his most successful and popular works.

In 2010, Reichardt and Til Schweiger co-founded the record label barefoot music for future film soundtrack releases and the development of solo artist projects. In 2011, Reichardt served as a jury member for the German Music Authors’ Award.

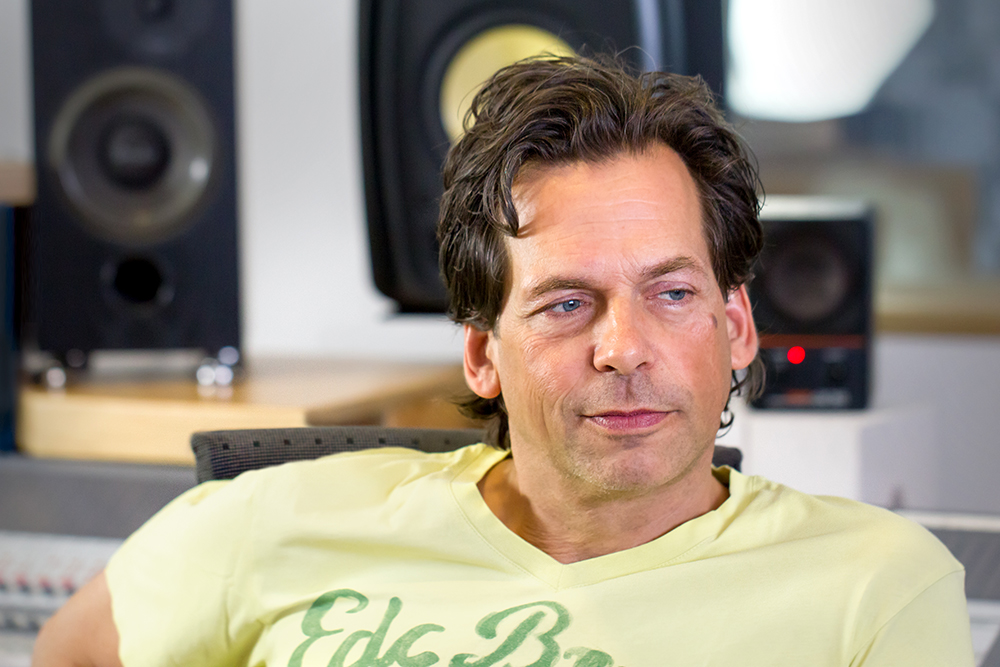
Reichardt in 2013

In 2014, the first edition of the series "Film Composers in Portrait – Dirk Reichardt" was published as a songbook featuring his most successful piano compositions. Between 2016 and 2019, he focused on his main instrument, releasing four solo piano albums in the Piano Stories series.

Since 2019, he has devoted himself extensively to the field of curative music, developing a therapeutic method called Audio Resonance Therapy (A.R.T.) with Hamburg-based physician Dr. med. Roya Schwarz. This method combines sound stimulation with relaxation techniques and holistic healing practices.

In parallel with his work in medico-functional music, Reichardt has continuously expanded his portfolio in radio branding and sound design with his company jamXmusic. His clients include renowned broadcasters such as WDR5, MDR Jump, rbb Antenne Brandenburg, and MDR Sachsen-Anhalt, for whom he produces tailored sound branding. He also works on soundtracks for podcasts (e.g., The Lina E. Case) and TV formats (e.g., MDR Quickie).

Since 2024, Reichardt has been studying Orchestration and Composition for Film and TV at the prestigious Berklee College of Music in Boston, USA. His latest film work is the score for the German-Austrian film 80plus (German title: Tony and Helene).

== Filmography ==
Year	Film	Notes and awards
2000	Now or Never: Time Is Money	
2004	Erbsen auf halb 6	German Film Prize (Gold) for best music
2004	Doppelter Einsatz	
2005	Barfuss	
2006	The Cloud	
2006	Helen, Ted und Fred	
2007	Paulas Geheimnis	
2007	One Way	
2007	Keinohrhasen	Platinum Award for soundtrack
2008	Der Rote Baron	
2008	1½ Knights: In Search of the Ravishing Princess Herzelinde	
2009	Zweiohrküken	Gold Award for soundtrack
2010	Jetzt erst recht	
2010	Kokowääh	Gold Award for soundtrack
2011	Doppelgängerin	
2012	Kokowääh II	
2012	Hochzeiten	
2013	Großstadtklein	
2013	Keinohrhase und Zweiohrküken/ animated movie, scoremusic und Music Supervisor)	
2013	Aschenbrödel und der Gestiefelte Kater/ film music und Music Supervisor)	
2014	[Honig im Kopf (German Original „Honig Im Kopf“)	
2024	80 plus (german title Tony und Helene)	
