= Alwara Höfels =

German stage and screen actress

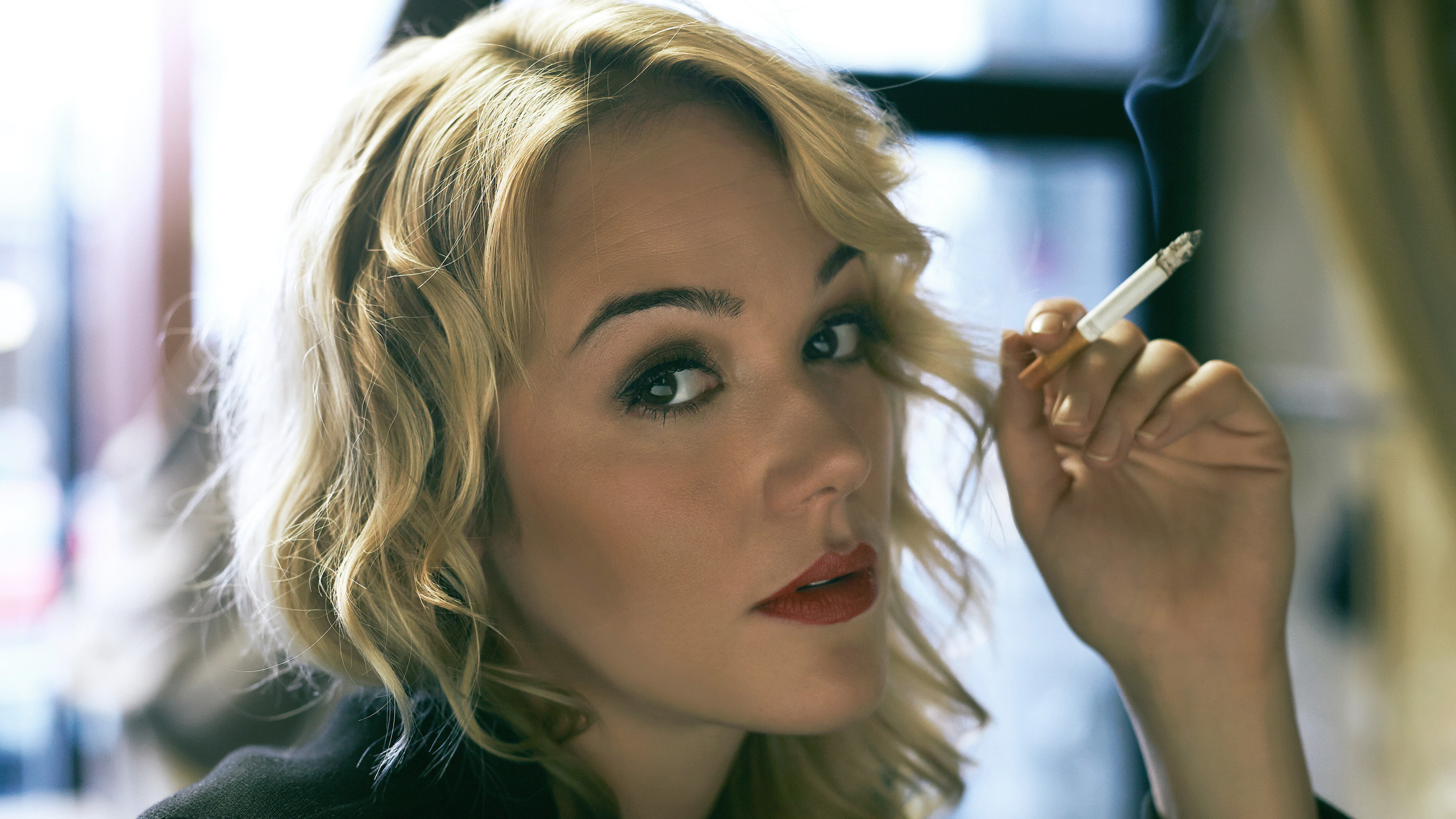
- Born: 6 April 1982 (age 43); Kronberg im Taunus, Germany
- Mother: Klara Höfels

Alwara Höfels (born 6 April 1982) is a German actress who works both in front of the camera and on the theater stage.

== Biography ==
Alwara Höfels was born 6 April 1982 in Kronberg im Taunus. She is the daughter of actors Klara Höfels and Michael Greiling. She attended the Ernst Busch Academy of Dramatic Arts from 2002 to 2007 where she studied drama. She was also part of the ensemble cast at the Deutsches Theater from 2006 to 2009. There she worked with directors Jürgen Gosch and Christoph Mehler.

Well-known for her first role in Rabbit Without Ears where she played the Miriam, Höfels got a role in the TV show 13 Hours: Race Against Time. In 2016 she played the part of an inspector in the Dresden Detectives episodes of the TV series Tatort, working alongside Karin Hanczewski and Martin Brambach. She also performed in a number of smaller roles on stage and on TV. In 2014 Höfels won the Hessian Television Awards' Best Actress award. She lives in Berlin.

== Filmography ==
=== Film ===
- 2007: Rabbit Without Ears
- 2009: Phantomschmerz
- 2010: When We Leave
- 2011: Blutzbrüdaz
- 2011: Someone Like Him
- 2012: Famous Five
- 2013: Fack ju Göhte
- 2015: Frau Müller muss weg!
- 2015: Fack ju Göhte 2
- 2018: Meine teuflisch gute Freundin
- 2018: So viel Zeit

=== Television ===
- 2007: GSG 9 – Ihr Einsatz ist ihr Leben (TV series, episode 1x12)
- 2008: Post Mortem (TV series, episode 2x04)
- 2008: Werther
- 2008: Bella Block: Das Schweigen der Kommissarin, Part 1 and Part 2
- 2009: Tatort: Architektur eines Todes
- 2009: Mein Flaschengeist und ich
- 2009: Rahel – eine preußische Affäre
- 2010–2012: Allein gegen die Zeit (TV series, 23 episodes)
- 2010: Der Doc und die Hexe
- 2010: Mord mit Aussicht (TV series, episode 1x10)
- 2010: Leipzig Homicide (TV series, episode 15x10)
- 2011: Mein Bruder, sein Erbe und ich
- 2011: Der Uranberg
- 2011: Weihnachtsengel küsst man nicht
- 2012: Tatort: Schmuggler
- 2012: Wilsberg: Die Bielefeld-Verschwörung
- 2012: Tatort: Alles hat seinen Preis
- 2012: Überleben an der Wickelfront
- 2013: Crime Scene Cleaner (TV series, episode 2x02)
- 2013: Crocodile
- 2013: Murder by Numbers
- 2013: The Old Fox (TV series, episode 370)
- 2014: Tatort: Der Eskimo
- 2014: Einmal Bauernhof und zurück (TV film)
- 2014: The Fisherman's Daughter
- 2014: Dr. Gressmann zeigt Gefühle
- 2015: Sturköpfe
- 2016: Hidden Identity
- 2016–2018: Tatort – Team Sieland, Gorniak und Schnabel

- 2016: Auf einen Schlag
- 2016: Der König der Gosse
- 2017: Level X
- 2017: Auge um Auge
- 2018: Déjà-vu
- 2018: Wer jetzt allein ist

- 2016: Mein Sohn, der Klugscheißer
- 2016: Der Andere
- 2017: Das doppelte Lottchen
- 2017: Harter Brocken: Die Kronzeugin
- 2018: Aufbruch in die Freiheit
- 2018: Keiner schiebt uns weg
- 2019: Befriending the Grouch
