= Manta, Manta: Legacy =

2023 German film by Til Schweiger

- Theatrical release poster
- Directed by: Til Schweiger
- Produced by: Viola Jäger; Christoph Müller; Philipp Reuter
- Starring: Til Schweiger; Michael Kessler; Tim Oliver Schultz; Luna Schweiger; Tina Ruland
- Cinematography: René Richter
- Edited by: Til Schweiger; Steven Wilhelm
- Music by: Martin Todsharow
- Production companies: Constantin Film; Barefoot Films; Olga-Film
- Distributed by: Constantin Film
- Release date: 30 March 2023
- Running time: 127 minutes
- Country: Germany
- Language: German
- Box office: $13 million

Manta, Manta: Legacy (German: Manta, Manta - Zwoter Teil) is a 2023 German action comedy film directed by Til Schweiger. The film is a sequel to the 1991 film Manta, Manta. Til Schweiger, Tina Ruland, Michael Kessler and Martin Armknecht reprise their roles from the original movie. Also starring are Tim Oliver Schultz and Luna Schweiger, Til Schweiger's daughter. It was released in Germany on 30 March 2023.

== Plot ==
30 years have passed since the first movie. Bertie (Til Schweiger) and Uschi (Tina Ruland) now have two children, son Daniel (Tim Oliver Schultz) and daughter Mücke (Luna Schweiger). However, they are separated: Daniel lives with Uschi, who now owns her own beauty salon; while Bertie, who used to race in DTM but hasn't now raced in 17 years, lives and works with Mücke in his garage "Berties Boxenstopp" with an attached go-kart track.

The movie opens with Bertie riding a bicycle to the DMV office to get his driver's license back, calling Klausi (Michael Kessler), the only remaining member of his friend group from 30 years ago, asking him to prepare the Opel Calibra in their garage for sale. As he hangs up, he is harassed by an arrogant young driver of a Volkswagen Golf R, Rico Feucht (Justus Johanssen), who, pretending to be racing against Bertie, hits his bicycle from the back, causing Bertie to crash.

Uschi and her partner, Gunnar (Moritz Bleibtreu) arrive at his villa, only to find it thrashed and Gunnar's Jaguar missing. The Jaguar is revealed to be taken by Daniel, who, aspiring to become an influencer, is drifting in a quarry with his friends, including his girlfriend Tessa (Charlotte Krause), who is filming it. Uschi then arrives and confronts him. Meanwhile, while Klausi is working at Bertie's garage, Axel (Martin Armknecht), whom he raced against in the first movie, arrives at the garage, saying he needs a car for an upcoming Classics race at Bilster Berg. Klausi then offers to sell him the Calibra, however, he then ruins things when Axel's girlfriend complains about her boots pinching, and he offers to help by urinating inside her boots (recreating a joke from the first movie, where it is claimed to have been an "old Army trick"), which gets him punched in the face by Axel. Bertie then arrives at the garage in his Manta A, then Rico arrives to pick up Mücke for a date, much to Bertie's objections. Bertie is then visited by bank manager Werner (Wotan Wilke Möhring), who informs him that they haven't received his loan installments for three months and he owes them 33,500 euros, while his account has been always in overdraft, and tells him that if he doesn't come up with the money by the end of the month, the bank will be forced to foreclose on the garage. Bertie discusses it with his crew, consisting of Mücke, Klausi, Tyrese (Ronis Goliath) and Salem (Tamer Trasoglu). Bertie's eyes then fall on the poster advertising the Classics race, with the grand prize being a Porsche 964 worth 150,000 euros, and decides to enter the race.

Bertie is then visited by Uschi, who informs him that Daniel, who's attending night school, is close to receiving his Abitur, yet is planning to drop out, and that she wants Bertie to take in Daniel for a while. However, Daniel, still mad at Bertie for having slapped him once, remains cold and distant towards him. Uschi also requests Bertie to come to Daniel's school as part of the "Career Day" (Beruforienterungstag) and talk about his job to the class. Bertie manages gives an impressive presentation, explaining that he chose to become a racecar driver and mechanic, because to him, cars represent freedom.

As Bertie and his crew test out the Calibra for the Classics race, it performs poorly, so they decide to steal another engine for it from Salem's uncle Aslan (Kailas Mahadevan), for which they recruit Klausi to seduce Aslan's rebellious daughter Siri (Nilam Farooq). While Klausi is inside, eating with Aslan's family and distracting them with Manta jokes, Bertie, Salem and Tyrese sneak into Aslan's garage to steal the engine. However, they knock over a tool chest that alerts Aslan, who starts shooting at their van with a shotgun, but they manage to escape with the engine. After fitting it in the Calibra, they test it out and it performs good. Bertie also has lunch with Uschi, who tells him that she still loves him, but she left him due to being afraid of him crashing while he raced in DTM and didn't want to ask him to quit racing, thinking it would have led to them breaking up.

Meanwhile, Daniel is out at a bar with his friends. However, when he tries to pay the bill for the group, he finds out that Gunnar has cancelled his credit card, embarrassing Daniel in front of his friends, and instead his friend Tom (Timur Bartels), who is hitting on Tessa, offers to pay. Daniel later discovers on Tom's Instagram account a romantic photo of Tom and Tessa together and freaks out. He then asks Bertie if he can lend him 1000 euros for Tessa's birthday party coming up, to which Bertie says he doesn't have that amount of money, and suggests to Daniel that Tessa might only like him for his money. Bertie later discovers that Daniel has stolen his credit card and gone to Tessa's party, and goes there with his crew to confront him. At the party, Daniel sees Tom and Tessa kissing, and Mücke sees Rico romantically dancing with another girl. Mücke then punches Rico and his girlfriend, and a fight ensues, whilst Daniel heads back to the garage and challenges Tom to a chicken race in the quarry, then heads out in Bertie's Calibra. As Bertie and his crew arrive at the garage and find Daniel gone, Mücke sees Daniel's challenge to Tom on Instagram, to which Salem remembers that they hadn't fixed the car's brakes yet. They head out to intercept Daniel, but arrive to find the race already underway. Tom eventually brakes before Daniel, but when Daniel attempts to brake and discovers the brakes malfunctioning, he bails out just before the Calibra goes over the cliff. Now having no car to race in, Bertie agrees to send his crew termination letters so they can apply for unemployment, and to close up the garage.

Gunnar then gives Daniel one last chance, ordering him to go to school and get his Abitur, and then move out. Daniel, deciding to take responsibility for his mistakes, agrees to the terms, but requests that Gunnar lend Bertie the money to pay back garage's loan. Gunnar refuses, saying that Bertie's problems stem from his lack of discipline. Daniel then walks out, and Uschi breaks up with Gunnar. Daniel heads over to Bertie's garage, and they reminisce, until Uschi drives into the garage in Bertie's old Manta B (from the first movie), which Bertie had thought she had sold to pay for her salon. Bertie and his crew then fit the engine from the Calibra into the Manta.

On the day of the race, Bertie wakes up and finds out that the Manta is ready to race, but also much to his dismay, Daniel and Mücke, not liking the original color scheme, have painted it all black. He then enters the race, however, as the light turns green, the engine suddenly stalls. He's able to restart it, but has to start in last place. He eventually catches up to the first place, where Rico tries to run him into the barrier, but instead ends up crashing himself, allowing Bertie to win the race.

In the last scene, Bertie and Uschi, now together again, drive to the seacoast in his Manta, now repainted to the original color scheme, and sit on the car's roof and kiss, in a scene similar to what Bertie told Daniel's classmates to imagine during the school visit.

== Cast ==
- Til Schweiger as Bertie Katzbach
- Tina Ruland as Uschi
- Michael Kessler as Klausi
- Tim Oliver Schultz as Daniel Katzbach
- Luna Schweiger as Mücke Katzbach
- Tamer Trasoglu as Salem
- Ronis Goliath as Tyrese
- Alena Gerber as Anna
- Nilam Farooq as Siri
- Justus Johanssen as Rico
- Emma Drogunova as Leonie
- Martin Armknecht as Axel
- Timur Bartels as Tom
- Moritz Bleibtreu as Gunnar
- Wotan Wilke Möhring as Herr Werner

== Production ==
Rumors about a sequel first surfaced around 2008. In 2010, it was officially mentioned for the first time that work was being done on it, with 11 November 2010 mentioned as the release date in various movie databases. However, the producer Bernd Eichinger died in January 2011 and the Manta, Manta 2 project was also frozen. In July 2015, it was speculated that the sequel Manta, Manta 2 would be released in cinemas to mark the 25th anniversary of the original movie, but this was ultimately not the case, while the leading actors of the first movie showed great interest in a sequel.

In an interview in 2018, actor Til Schweiger once again hinted at an interest in a sequel that would show what had become of the characters decades later. However, the film rights for a sequel were held by Constantin Film and Schweiger was under contract with Warner Bros., thus Constantin would have to develop the screenplay on its own initiative, and his proposal to buy the film rights from Constantin Film were rejected. In 2019, Constantin Film announced that they had been "working on a concept and script for a second part for some time". On May 23, 2022, Manta, Manta 2 was officially confirmed and filming began in June 2022. On January 9, 2023, Constantin Film and Til Schweiger released a teaser for the new film. The film was released in cinemas on March 30, 2023.

After the film was released, Der Spiegel reported on allegations that Schweiger had appeared on set several times drunk. In one case, this had also led to fisticuffs. Schweiger and the Constantin Film initially denied the allegations. However, Martin Moszkowicz, managing director of Constantin Film, admitted his own mistakes shortly afterwards and confirmed that the decision was made to continue filming after the incident, as the financial damage would otherwise have been too great for everyone involved.

The film reached the top of German cinema charts with 370,000 admissions in its first weekend, making it the best opening result of a German film in 2023 to date. In its 3rd week in cinemas, the film passed the 1 million viewer mark, making it more successful than the original Manta, Manta film.
