= Emma Schweiger =

American-German actress (born 2002)

- Born: 26 October 2002 (age 23); Los Angeles, California, U.S.
- Occupation: Actress
- Years active: 2007–present
- Parents: Til Schweiger (father); Dana Schweiger (mother)
- Relatives: Valentin Schweiger (brother); Luna Schweiger (sister); Lilli Schweiger (sister)

Emma Tiger Schweiger (born 26 October 2002) is an American and German actress. She is known for playing the role of Cheyenne Blue in the 2007 film Keinohrhasen and its 2009 sequel Zweiohrküken and the role of Magdalena in Kokowääh and its 2013 sequel Kokowääh 2, all directed by her father Til Schweiger.

== Family ==
Emma Tiger Schweiger was born on 26 October 2002 in Los Angeles, California, to German actor Til Schweiger and American fashion model Dana Schweiger (born Carlson). She is the youngest of four children, after Valentin (born 1995), Luna (born 1997) and Lilli (born 1998). All four are child actors, having first appeared in the 2007 film Keinohrhasen and its 2009 sequel Zweiohrküken, directed by their father. Her parents separated in 2005. Schweiger now lives with her mother in Malibu, California.

== Career ==
Schweiger made her film debut as Cheyenne Blue in Keinohrhasen (2007), co–starring Nora Tschirner and her father Til Schweiger, who also directed the film. In 2009, she reprised her role in the Keinohrhasen sequel, Zweiohrküken. In 2011, Schweiger starred along with her father in his new film Kokowääh and has since reprised her role in the sequel Kokowääh 2. After that, she played Conni in Conni & Co.

== Filmography ==
Year	Film	Role	Notes and awards
2005	Barefoot	Herself	Guest Role
2007	Keinohrhasen	Cheyenne Blue	Main Cast
2009	Men in the City	Emily	Guest Role
2009	Zweiohrküken	Cheyenne Blue	Main Cast
2011	Kokowääh	Magdalena	Co-Lead Role
2011	Die Pfotenbande	Herself	Lead Role and Presenter; 12 episodes, Boomerang series
2012	Und weg bist du	Lucy Becker	Co-Lead Role
2013	Kokowääh 2	Magdalena	Co-Lead Role
2013	Alice's Birthday	Bolo	German dub
2015	Honig im Kopf	Tilda	Main Cast
2015	Das Spiel beginnt	Herself	Host; 1 episode
2016	Conni & Co	Conni	Lead Role
2017	Conni & Co 2	Conni	Lead Role
2018	Head Full of Honey		
2021	The Salvation of The World as We Know It	Winnie	
