= Lilli Schweiger =

German actress (born 1998)

- Born: 17 July 1998 (age 28); Berlin, Germany
- Occupation: Actress
- Years active: 2007–present
- Parents: Til Schweiger (father); Dana Carlsen (mother)
- Relatives: Valentin Schweiger (brother); Luna Schweiger (sister); Emma Schweiger (sister)

Lilli Camille Schweiger (born 17 July 1998) is a German film actress. She is best known for her performance in the 2007 film Keinohrhasen and its 2009 sequel Zweiohrküken, both of which were directed by and feature her father Til Schweiger.

== Family ==
Lilli Camille Schweiger was born on 17 July 1998 in Berlin to German actor Til Schweiger and American fashion model Dana Carlsen. She is the third of four children, after Valentin (born 1995) and Luna (born 1997), and before Emma (born 2002). She suffered from Leukemia for four years from age 7 to age 11. All four of them are child actors, having all appeared in the 2007 film Keinohrhasen and its 2009 sequel Zweiohrküken, directed by their father. Her parents separated in 2005.

== Career ==
Schweiger made her film debut as Sascha in Keinohrhasen (2007), co–starring Nora Tschirner and her father Til Schweiger, who also directed the film, and reprised her role in its 2009 sequel, Zweiohrküken. Her brother and sisters, Valentin and Luna and Emma Tiger also appeared in the films.

She modeled with Roma e Toska in 2011.

== Filmography ==
Year	Title	Role	Notes
2007	Keinohrhasen	Sascha	
2009	Zweiohrküken	Sascha	
2018	Klassentreffen 1.0	Lili	
