= Where Is Fred? =

- Directed by: Anno Saul
- Written by: Bora Dağtekin
- Produced by: Philip Voges; Eberhard Junkersdorf
- Starring: Til Schweiger; Alexandra Maria Lara; Jürgen Vogel; Christoph Maria Herbst
- Cinematography: Peter Nix
- Edited by: Tobias Haas
- Music by: Marcel Barsotti
- Distributed by: Senator Film
- Release date: November 16, 2006
- Running time: 111 minutes
- Country: Germany
- Language: German

Where Is Fred? (German: Wo ist Fred?), also credited as Where Is Fred!?, is a 2006 German film directed by Anno Saul, and produced by Philip Voges and Eberhard Junkersdorf. Written by Bora Dağtekin, it stars Til Schweiger, Alexandra Maria Lara, Jürgen Vogel and Christoph Maria Herbst.

== Plot summary ==
Fred plans to marry his girlfriend Mara, and he proposes to her in front of a sold-out basketball arena. Instead of accepting, Mara puts that decision on her spoiled son Linus. In order to get Linus to like him, Fred decides to give him a basketball from his favorite team. He poses as a fan using a wheelchair so that he can get it, but when he catches the ball, he also catches the attention of the young, attractive filmmaker Denise, who wants to feature a disabled fan in a PR campaign for the team. Fred has to keep playing his role, while the real disabled and really furious fan Ronny might call his bluff at any moment.

== Cast ==
- Til Schweiger as Fred
- Alexandra Maria Lara as Denise
- Jürgen Vogel as Alex
- Christoph Maria Herbst as Ronnie
- Anja Kling as Mara
- Ramon Julia König as Linus
- Gerit Kling as Mara's Sister Sabine
- Pasquale Aleardi as Benno Held
- Tanja Wenzel as Vicky
- David Scheller as Zlatko
- Fahri Yardım as Mehmet
- Daniel Steiner as Christian
- Vanessa Petruo as Julia
- Eckhard Preuß as Stefan
- Ursela Monn as Mrs. Grundmann
- Klaus Manchen as Mr. Hubert
- Kurt Krömer as Mr. Bubback
- Erwin Aljukic as Niklas
- Adele Neuhauser as Mrs. Hildegart
- Michael Hanemann as Mr. Grundmann

== Other releases ==
Where Is Fred? was released on DVD on 14 May 2007, and on Blu-ray on 21 January 2011. The soundtrack album was released on 17 November 2006 through the Polystar Records.

=== Soundtrack listing ===
Where Is Fred?

Soundtrack album by Various Artists
- Released: 17 November 2006
- Genre: Pop, rock, funk, soul, classical
- Label: Polystar

1. Bob Geldof — "Room 19 (Sha La La La Lee)"
2. Bass]— "Playing Games Remix"
3. Mr. Scruff — "Spandex Man"
4. Absynthe Minded — "Pretty Horny Flow Full"
5. Swinging Girls — "Lass Dich Mit Musik Verwöhnen"
6. Giuseppe Verdi — "Il Trovatore: Anvil Chorus (Act II)"
7. Orson — "No Tomorrow"
8. New Found Glory — "I Don't Wanna Know"
9. Paris — "Freedom"
10. James Brown — "Get Up (I Feel Like Being a) Sex Machine"
11. Timid Tiger — "Miss Murray"
12. Siebeth feat. Miss Jessica — "3 Minutes"
13. Snow Patrol — "Chasing Cars"

== Reception ==
=== Critical response ===
Where Is Fred? received mixed to negative reviews. Prisma-Online.de described the film as "flat, childish, annoying and stupid". The Lexicon of International Films named it as "the mix of desolate confusion, outrageous script and irritating stereotype". However, F. M. Hemke of Filmszene.de wrote that Where Is Fred? was a "really funny and entertaining film, a successful firework of situation comedy, despite a lame start", and gave the film seven out of ten points. Matthew Englander of LiveJournal gave the film rather mixed review, writing, "have to admit that parts of it were quite funny but overall it went on too long". Marcus Kleine Filmseit called the film "politically incorrect", but praised the performance of Christoph Maria Herbst. Claudia Wente also praised the performance of Jürgen Vogel and wrote that he "played with convincing ease".

=== Accolades ===
Tanja Wenzel won Undine Award for Best Young Comedian for her performance, while Til Schweiger won Jupiter Award for Best German Actor.

== Release dates ==
Country	Release date	Title	Notes
Germany	16 November 2006	Wo ist Fred?	
Austria	17 November 2006	Wo ist Fred?	
Hungary	3 July 2007	Hol van Fred?	Straight-to-DVD
Russia	12 July 2007	На колёсах	
Ukraine	12 July 2007	На колесах	
Argentina	16 September 2007	Dónde está Fred?	
Canada	25 November 2007	Where Is Fred!?	Ottawa European Union Film Festival
Canada	2 December 2007	Where Is Fred!?	Vancouver European Union Film Festival
South Korea	10 July 2008		
