= Phantom Pain (film) =

- Theatrical release poster
- Directed by: Matthias Emcke
- Written by: Matthias Emcke
- Produced by: Henning Ferber; Marcus Welke; Sebastian Zühr
- Starring: Til Schweiger; Jana Pallaske; Stipe Erceg; Luna Schweiger
- Cinematography: Ngo The Chau
- Edited by: Martina Matuschewski
- Music by: Martin Todsharow
- Production companies: Film1; Warner Bros. Film Productions Germany; Barefoot Films; Neue Bioskop Film
- Distributed by: Warner Bros. Pictures
- Release date: 30 April 2009
- Running time: 98 minutes
- Country: Germany
- Language: German
- Box office: $778,819

Phantom Pain (German: Phantomschmerz) is a 2009 German romantic drama film written and directed by Matthias Emcke. The film stars Til Schweiger and Jana Pallaske.

The film was released in Germany on 30 April 2009 by Warner Bros. Pictures.

== Cast ==
- Til Schweiger as Marc
- Jana Pallaske as Nika
- Stipe Erceg as Alexander
- Luna Schweiger as Sarah
- Vijessna Ferkic as Clara
- Yvo Rene Scharf as Dr. Keil
- Sarah Masuch as Ina
- Stephan Grossmann as Martin
- Antje Traue as Anja
