= Kokowääh =

- Theatrical release poster
- Directed by: Til Schweiger
- Written by: Béla Jarzyk; Til Schweiger
- Produced by: Béla Jarzyk; Til Schweiger; Thomas Zickler
- Starring: Til Schweiger; Emma Schweiger; Jasmin Gerat; Samuel Finzi
- Cinematography: Christoph Wahl
- Edited by: Constantin von Seld
- Music by: Dirk Reichardt; Mirko Schaffer; Martin Todsharow
- Production companies: Barefoot Films; Béla Jarzyk Production; Warner Bros. Film Producions Germany
- Distributed by: Warner Bros. Pictures
- Release date: 3 February 2011 (Germany)
- Running time: 126 minutes
- Country: Germany
- Language: German
- Budget: €5.65 million ($7.8 million)
- Box office: $45.4 million

Kokowääh is a 2011 German film directed by Til Schweiger. It was released in German-speaking countries (Germany, Austria, South Tyrol and Switzerland) on 3 February 2011. The film stars Til Schweiger, his daughter Emma Schweiger, Jasmin Gerat and Samuel Finzi. Another of Schweiger's daughters, Luna Schweiger, makes a small appearance in the film. Kokowääh is an onomatopoetic depiction of the French pronunciation of coq au vin. A sequel, Kokowääh 2, was released on 7 February 2013 with Schweiger having returned as director, co-writer and producer.

== Plot ==
Kokowääh is set in Berlin and Potsdam. The plot concerns the travails of Henry (Til Schweiger), an established screenwriter, who must deal with the emergence of his eight-year-old natural daughter Magdalena (Emma Schweiger), the previously unknown product of a one-night indiscretion in Stockholm. In the meantime, he is working on the adaptation of a famous best–selling novel written by his ex–girlfriend Katharina (Jasmin Gerat), with whom he is working on the adaptation. Magdalena, still in the state of shock, loves her adoptive father Tristan (Samuel Finzi) more than the biological one. As Henry and Magdalena's relationship continues, Henry learns to work with Tristan to parent her while the mother is working in New York. Throughout the film, Henry and Magdalena build a close relationship, which he eventually describes in his script "Kokowääh" (referring to the French meal "Coq au vin"). Henry sends his script to Katharina in an attempt to recoup, the script ending with them getting married. They meet again after she reads it, and get together at Magdalena's request. Eventually all four of the adults become friends and all help raise Magdalena.

== Cast ==
- Til Schweiger as Henry
- Emma Schweiger as Magdalena
- Jasmin Gerat as Katharina
- Samuel Finzi as Tristan
- Numan Acar as the worker
- Meret Becker as Charlotte
- Anne-Sophie Briest as the mother in the supermarket
- Anna Julia Kapfelsperger as Bine
- Friederike Kempter as the agent
- Torsten Künstler as the courier
- Miranda Leonhardt as Maria
- Mišel Matičević as Rob Kaufmann
- Genoveva Mayer as the woman in the bar
- Sönke Möhring as the policeman
- Jessica Richter as Esther
- Luna Schweiger as the daughter in the supermarket
- Katharina Thalbach as the patient
- Sanny van Heteren as Christiane
- Johann von Bülow as the firefighter
- Richard von Groeling as Rashid
- Jahmar Walker as the "Chap"
- Ulrich Wickert as the newscaster
- Birthe Wolter as the receptionist
- Fahri Ogün Yardım as the pizza guy

== Production ==
Kokowääh was filmed in Berlin and Potsdam from 21 July to 13 September 2010. The budget was estimated to be €5,650,000. Director and lead actor Til Schweiger and Béla Jarzyk, who also produced the film, wrote the script in a Turkish hotel in Berlin.

== Critical reception ==
Kokowääh received the Golden Screen Award, which is given to films that have been watched by more than 3 million viewers. It was the most successful film in Germany in the first half of 2011. The film itself received generally good to mixed reviews. Andreas Scheiner of weekly magazine Die Zeit found the film "light and entertaining", though he added it "lacked depth". Dieter Oßwald of the Programmkino.de praised the film as a "strong–point daddy–comedy". Andrea Butz of public radio station WDR2, however, criticized the film for "one–dimensional leaps and drawn characters". Jan Füchtjohann of the Süddeutsche Zeitung also criticized Kokowääh, writing it showed "over long distances like a commercial for yogurt". Boyd van Hoeij described the film in his review for Variety as a ″series of mismatched-duo cliches spun out across a two-hour-plus running time" with ″a pretty decent if unoriginal 80-minute film hiding somewhere in this bloated two-hour-plus exercise″. His prediction: ″Though its $38 million haul makes it Germany's highest grosser of 2011 so far, biz beyond central Europe, Schweiger's only base, will again be minimal."

== Other media ==
=== Music ===
The soundtrack album for Kokowääh was released on 4 February 2011 on iTunes and Amazon.com through Sony Music. The lead single "Stay" by British synthpop band Hurts was released on 4 February in Germany, reaching number three at the German singles chart and achieving gold certification. The music video for "Stay" has two versions, the regular one and the one that features parts from Kokowääh.

=== Home media ===
Kokowääh was released on both DVD and Blu-ray on 19 August 2011 on iTunes and Amazon.com.

== Release dates ==
Country	Release date	Title	Notes
Germany	3 February 2011	Kokowääh	
Austria	3 February 2011	Kokowääh	
Switzerland	3 February 2011	Kokowääh	
Luxembourg	5 February 2011	Kokowääh	
Kazakhstan	8 September 2011	Kokowääh	
Russia	8 September 2011	Соблазнитель	
Belarus	15 September 2011	Kokowääh	
Taiwan	20 January 2012	紅酒燉香雞	
Hungary	28 July 2012	Kislány a küszöbön	TV premiere
Italy	1 September 2013	Kokowääh	TV premiere
