= Frau Müller muss weg! =

2015 film directed by Sönke Wortmann

- Theatrical release poster
- Directed by: Sönke Wortmann
- Written by: Oliver Ziegenbalg
- Based on: a play by Lutz Hübner and Sarah Nemitz
- Starring: Gabriela Maria Schmeide; Justus von Dohnányi
- Cinematography: Tom Fährmann
- Edited by: Martin Wolf
- Music by: Martin Todsharow
- Production companies: Constantin Film; Little Shark Entertainment
- Distributed by: Constantin Film
- Release date: 15 January 2015
- Running time: 83 minutes
- Country: Germany
- Language: German

Frau Müller muss weg! is a 2015 German comedy film directed by Sönke Wortmann.

== Cast ==
- Gabriela Maria Schmeide - Frau Müller
- Justus von Dohnányi - Wolf Heider
- Anke Engelke - Jessica Höfel
- Ken Duken - Patrick Jeskow
- Mina Tander - Marina Jeskow
- Alwara Höfels - Katja Grabowski
- Rainer Galke - Hausmeister
- Juergen Maurer - Hape Höfel
- Dagmar Sachse - Heidrun Heider
