= Guardians (2012 film) =

- Theatrical release poster
- Directed by: Til Schweiger
- Written by: Til Schweiger; Paul Maurice; Stephen Butchard
- Produced by: Til Schweiger; Paul Maurice; Thomas Zickler
- Starring: Til Schweiger; Luna Schweiger; Moritz Bleibtreu
- Cinematography: Adrian Cranage
- Edited by: Constantin von Seld
- Music by: Martin Todsharow
- Production companies: Barefoot Films; Warner Bros. Film Productions Germany
- Distributed by: Warner Bros. Pictures
- Release dates: 24 June 2012 (Mazar-i-Sharif); 18 September 2012 (Berlin); 28 September 2012 (Germany)
- Running time: 133 minutes
- Country: Germany
- Language: German

Guardians (German title: Schutzengel) is a 2012 German action film directed and written by Til Schweiger. It stars Til Schweiger, Luna Schweiger, and Moritz Bleibtreu.

== Cast ==
- Til Schweiger as Max Fischer
- Luna Schweiger as Nina
- Moritz Bleibtreu as Rudi
- Karoline Schuch as Sara Müller
- Hannah Herzsprung as Helena
- Nina Eichinger as TV Reporterin n-TV
- Oliver Korittke as Rezeptionist
- Heiner Lauterbach as Thomas Backer
- Tim Wilde as Nicholas
- Axel Stein as Leo
- Jacob Matschenz as Toni Santer
- Jana Reinermann as nurse
- Herbert Knaup as Henri Brietner
- Kostja Ullmann as Kurt
- Katharina Schüttler as Police Diner
- Anna-Katharina Samsel as Streifenpolizistin
- Fahri Ogün Yardım as Streifenpolizist
- Ralph Herforth as Streifenpolizist
- Mickey Hardt as wrong police man
- Kasem Hoxha as the Watcher
