= Frau Ella =

- Theatrical release poster
- Directed by: Markus Goller
- Written by: Dirk Ahner
- Produced by: Matthias Schweighöfer; Dan Maag; Marco Beckmann
- Starring: Matthias Schweighöfer; Ruth Maria Kubitschek
- Cinematography: Ueli Steiger
- Edited by: Simon Gstöttmayr
- Music by: Maurus Ronner; Martin Todsharow
- Production companies: Pantaleon Films; Warner Bros. Film Productions Germany; Cactus Films
- Distributed by: Warner Bros. Pictures
- Release date: 17 October 2013
- Running time: 105 minutes
- Country: Germany
- Language: German
- Box office: $12 million

Frau Ella is a 2013 German comedy film directed by Markus Goller.

== Cast ==
- Matthias Schweighöfer as Sascha
- Ruth Maria Kubitschek as Frau Ella
- August Diehl as Klaus
- Anna Bederke as Lina
- Anatole Taubman as Rudolph
- Sahin Eryilmaz as Arzt Krankenhaus
- Anna Thalbach as Schwester Erika
- Luc Feit as Kalle
