= Rabbit Without Ears =

2007 film by Til Schweiger

- Theatrical release poster
- Directed by: Til Schweiger
- Written by: Til Schweiger; Anika Decker
- Produced by: Til Schweiger; Thomas Zickler
- Starring: Til Schweiger; Nora Tschirner
- Edited by: Charles Ladmiral
- Music by: Stefan Hansen; Dirk Reichardt; Mirko Schaffer
- Production companies: Barefoot Films; Warner Bros. Film Productions Germany; Seven Pictures
- Distributed by: Warner Bros. Pictures
- Release date: 20 December 2007
- Running time: 115 minutes
- Country: Germany
- Language: German
- Budget: €4.2 million
- Box office: $74 million

Rabbit Without Ears (German title: Keinohrhasen, lit. "No-Ear Rabbits") is a 2007 German romantic comedy film, written, produced and directed by Til Schweiger. Co-written by Anika Decker, and starring Nora Tschirner and Schweiger himself, the plot revolves around yellow press reporter Ludo and his ex-classmate Anna, who reconnect after many years when he is sentenced to 300 hours of community service at her day-care facility.

Produced by Barefoot Films and Warner Bros. Film Productions Germany, the film premiered in theaters across Germany on 20 December 2007, and became a surprise box-office hit, eventually grossing $74 million, mostly from its domestic run. By 20 April 2008, Keinohrhasen had reached over six million viewers, ranking it sixth on the list of the most successful German films in Germany since the beginning of the audience census in 1968. Also a critical success, the film was awarded the Goldene Leinwand, a Bogey Award, the Deutscher Comedypreis and a Bambi and received a nomination for the Audience Award at the European Film Awards 2008.

A sequel, entitled Rabbit Without Ears 2, was released on 3 December 2009.

== Plot ==
Ludo Decker (Schweiger) is a Berlin-based yellow press reporter. With photographer Moritz, his daily routine is to spy on celebrities for the tabloid Das Blatt. He also uses his work for frequent sexual contacts with objects of his interest.

Ludo and Moritz are on scene at the engagement party of heavyweight boxer and celebrity Wladimir Klitschko and Yvonne Catterfeld. As Klitschko raises his glass to toast his fiancée, Ludo breaks through the glass dome roof and tumbles into the cake, to the great consternation of the guests. For this offense he is sentenced to three hundred hours of community service at a local Kindergarten (daycare center).

There he encounters Kindergarten director Anna Gotzlowski (Tschirner), who grew up in the same neighborhood as Ludo and frequently endured his pranks and mockery. She exacts revenge for these childhood torments by assigning him to perform humiliating tasks. With his parole at stake, Ludo has no choice but to comply. Nevertheless, he remains interested in one-night stands and has an affair with Nina, mother of Cheyenne Blue, one of the children in his charge.

Eventually tensions between Ludo and Anna dissipate and the two become friends. When Anna's date with a man goes awry, she appears at Ludo's flat seeking comfort. The two of them end up in bed, yet Anna's hopes that this will develop into something more serious are dashed, as Ludo sees her only as a friend. Anna subsequently meets actor Jürgen Vogel in a park and starts dating him. When she accompanies Vogel to the German Film Awards ceremony, Ludo reports that she is the most beautiful woman in attendance, instead of covering female celebrities his editor-in-chief deems more newsworthy. The editor summarily fires him.

Ludo comes to realize that he feels more for Anna than he had previously thought. During a children's festival at a local theatre, he crashes a performance and professes his love for her, as she sits in the audience with the children. Having lost his job at the tabloid, he takes a position at the Kindergarten.

== Cast ==
- Til Schweiger as Ludo Decker, a well-known yellow press reporter and libertine who is sentenced to 300 hours of community service in a local daycare facility run by his ex-classmate Anna Gotzlowski. Ludo is Latin for "I play". His character was conceptualized as a "comedic tour de force" for Schweiger.
- Nora Tschirner as Anna Gotzlowski, Ludo's ex-classmate and head of a daycare, who initially harbours resentment towards Ludo, having not overcome his teasing over 20 years ago. Schweiger created the role of Anna specifically with Tschirner in mind, citing her "one of the best screen actresses in Germany."
- Matthias Schweighöfer as Moritz, a paparazzo and friend of Ludo
- Alwara Höfels as Miriam Steinfeld, a colleague and friend of Anna
- Barbara Rudnik as Lilli Decker
- Paul Maximilian Schüller as Lollo
- Emma Schweiger as Cheyenne-Blue, a child at the daycare facility
- Brigitte Zeh as Nina, Cheyenne-Blue's mother
- Lilli Camille Schweiger as Sacha, another child at the daycare facility
- Luna Marie Schweiger as young Anna
- Valentin Florian Schweiger as young Ludo
- Rick Kavanian, as the choleric chief editor of the tabloid Das Blatt
- Jürgen Vogel as himself
- Christian Tramitz as Anna's date
- Wladimir Klitschko as himself
- Yvonne Catterfeld as herself
- Wolfgang Stumph as a taxi driver
- Armin Rohde as Bello
- Fahri Ogün Yardım as Mucki
- Kai Lentrodt as a taxi driver
- Sonsee Neu as a judge
- Pasquale Aleardi as Ludo's attorney
- Paul van Dyk as DJ Paul van Dyk
- Elena Uhlig as a hotel worker
- Gregor Bloéb as Michi Nußbaumer, a folk musician
- Nina Proll as Daniela Berg, Michi's
- Anne-Sophie Briest as Mandy, a headline-making "Ministerluder"

== Soundtrack ==
=== Music from the Motion Picture album ===
Keinohrhasen

Soundtrack album by various artists
- Released: 7 December 2007
- Genres: Pop, rock, film music
- Length: 68:47
- Label: Universal Music

Professional ratings
Review scores
Source	Rating
CDStars	7/10 stars

Track listing

1. "Mr. Brightside" (Jacques Lu Cont's Thin White Duke Mix) (The Killers) – 8:48
2. "Deepest Blue" (Deepest Blue) – 3:24
3. "Is It Love" (Stefan Hansen, Dirk Reichardt, Mirko Schaffer) – 2:18
4. "Anna & Ludo – Hold Me Now" (Rea Garvey) – 1:47
5. "Springtimes" (Stefan Hansen, Dirk Reichardt, Mirko Schaffer) – 2:56
6. "Lifeline" (Angels & Airwaves) – 4:16
7. "Autumn Leaves" (Stefan Hansen, Dirk Reichardt, Mirko Schaffer) – 1:42
8. "Everybody's Changing" (Keane) – 3:35
9. "Looking for Atlantis" (Prefab Sprout) – 4:03
10. "Rain" (Stefan Hansen, Dirk Reichardt, Mirko Schaffer) – 1:18
11. "I Still Remember" (Bloc Party) – 4:20
12. "Liquid" (Stefan Hansen, Dirk Reichardt, Mirko Schaffer) – 1:43
13. "Everything's Magic" (Angels & Airwaves) – 3:51
14. "Some Time" (Stefan Hansen, Dirk Reichardt, Mirko Schaffer) – 1:59
15. "Sad Song" (Au Revoir Simone) – 4:07
16. "Apologize (Timbaland presents OneRepublic) – 3:04
17. "A Rainy Day in Vancouver" (Stefan Hansen, Dirk Reichardt, Mirko Schaffer) – 1:38
18. "Rocket Brothers" (Kashmir) – 5:27
19. "Perfect Circle" (Stefan Hansen, Dirk Reichardt, Mirko Schaffer) – 2:57
20. "Cheyenne Blue" (Stefan Hansen, Dirk Reichardt, Mirko Schaffer) – 1:40
21. "Der Zauberlehrling" (Junge Dichter & Denker) – 3:54

=== Charts ===
Chart (2007)	Peak position
Austrian Albums Chart	13
European Top 100 Albums	14
German Albums Chart	2
Swiss Albums Chart	46

=== Year-end charts ===
Chart (2008)	Rank
German Albums Chart	17

=== Certifications ===
Country	Certifications (sales thresholds)
Germany	Platinum

== The title ==
While doing handicraft at the daycare centre, Ludo sews a stuffed rabbit without ears. As Anna criticises him for it, he points at the fact that another rabbit made by the child Cheyenne-Blue has no ears as well. Anna thereupon claims that it is a Keinohrhase, a no-ears rabbit, which is able to hear through its nose. This scene was also used for the first teaser trailer.

A rare earless rabbit born in February 2012 at a zoo in Limbach-Oberfrohna, Saxony was named "Til", in reference to this film's title and its director. The baby rabbit was accidentally crushed when a television cameraman stepped on him, an event that was briefly the subject of international media coverage.

== American remake ==
In January 2010, Schweiger sold the rights for the US remake of Keinohrhasen to Newmarket Entertainment; he stated he hoped to direct the film and engage Ben Affleck as leading man.

== Awards ==
- 2008: Goldene Leinwand mit Stern for more than 6 million viewers
- 2008: Bogey Awards in gold for 3 million viewers within 30 days
- 2008: Ernst Lubitsch Prize
- 2010: Bronze Palm Award at the Mexico International Film Festival
