= Vier gegen die Bank (2016 film) =

2016 German crime comedy film by Wolfgang Petersen

- Theatrical release poster
- Directed by: Wolfgang Petersen
- Written by: Tripper Clancy
- Based on: The Nixon Recession Caper by Ralph Maloney
- Produced by: Christopher Doll; Lothar Hellinger; Barbara Huber; Mark Nolting; Wolfgang Petersen
- Starring: Til Schweiger; Matthias Schweighöfer; Michael Herbig; Jan Josef Liefers
- Cinematography: Daniel Gottschalk
- Edited by: Peter R. Adam
- Music by: Enis Rotthoff
- Production companies: Hellinger / Doll Filmproduktion; Warner Bros. Film Productions Germany
- Distributed by: Warner Bros. Pictures
- Release date: 25 December 2016
- Running time: 96 minutes
- Country: Germany
- Language: German
- Box office: $9,193,243

Vier gegen die Bank ("Four Against the Bank") is a 2016 German comedy crime film directed by Wolfgang Petersen. It was Petersen's first German-language film since Das Boot in 1981 and his final film as a director before his death in 2022. It was his second adaptation of The Nixon Recession Caper by Ralph Maloney. His 1976 adaptation was produced for television broadcast on ARD.

== Plot ==
Four men who are disgruntled about their treatment by the bank join to steal from it.

== Cast ==
- Til Schweiger as Chris
- Matthias Schweighöfer as Max
- Michael Herbig as Tobias
- Jan Josef Liefers as Peter
- Antje Traue as Elisabeth Zollner
- Alexandra Maria Lara as Freddie
- Jana Pallaske as Heidi
- Claudia Michelsen as Susanne Schumacher
- Jasmin Lord as sexy girl
- Fahri Yardim as homeless man
- Thomas Heinze as Schumacher
- Chris Theisinger as bank employee
- Stefan Becker as Jesus freak
- Viktor Bleischwitz as bank robber

== See also ==
- Tower Heist (2011)
