= Die Pilgerin =

- Written by: Don Schubert; Khyana el Bitar; Sebastian Orlac; Marc O. Seng
- Directed by: Philipp Kadelbach
- Starring: Josefine Preuß; Jacob Matschenz; Volker Bruch; Friedrich von Thun; Dietmar Bär; Sebastian Hülk; Ernst Stötzner; Sven Pippig; Stipe Erceg; Lucas Gregorowicz; Roeland Wiesnekker; Jiri Roskot; Lucas Prisor; Uwe Preuss; Carlo Ljubek; Tómas Lemarquis; Laura de Boer
- Composers: Fabian Römer, Steffen M. Kaltschmid
- Original language: German
- No. of episodes: 2

Production
- Producer: Benjamin Benedict
- Production locations: Germany, Austria, Czech Republic
- Cinematography: David Slama
- Editors: Simon Blasi; Nils Landmark; Janina Gerkens; Patrick Wilfert
- Running time: 175 minutes

Original release
- Network: ZDF
- Release: 5 January – 6 January 2014

Die Pilgerin (English - The Female Pilgrim) is a two-part German television film directed by Philipp Kadelbach and produced by Benjamin Benedict. It premiered on 5 and 6 January 2014 on Zweiten Deutschen Fernsehen.

== Plot ==
As a merchant's daughter in Ulm late in the 14th century, young Tilla Willinger lives a comfortable life until her father Eckhardt falls ill and decides to leave his business to Damian, the mayor's son and Tilla's fiancé. To prevent this and replace Damian as Eckhardt's heir, Tilla's brother Otfried secretly kills Eckhardt and conceals his will. Instead of Damian, Otfried forces Tilla to marry the vicious businessman Veit Gürtler, who dies of a heart attack on their wedding night.

Otfried also ignores his father's request to take his heart to Santiago de Compostela and so Tilla cuts it out herself and sets out alone, carrying a letter revealing Otfried's schemes. She disguises herself as a young man to join a group of pilgrims. Ignorant of the letter, Gürtler's illegitimate son Rigobert persecutes her on her journey on Otfried's orders - Rigobert also believes Tilla murdered his father and is out for revenge. To protect her the mayor's youngest son Sebastian Laux also joins her group of pilgrims.

Tilla and Sebastian are captured when the group is attacked in France - they escape but lose Eckhardt's heart, which falls into Rigobert's hands. She meets him and exchanges what she thinks is her brother's letter for the heart, not knowing Sebastian had swapped the document with a worthless letter. Rigobert hands it over to Otfried, who angrily arrests him. Tilla and Sebastian finally reach Santiago de Compostela and bury her father's heart and in the meantime Otfried kills Damian and imprisons his father, the mayor. Tilla returns home with the real letter and frees Rigobert and Damian's and Sebastian's father, who in turn accuses Otfried with the real document. Otfried tries to escape but is killed in the market square by Rigobert.

== Cast ==
- Josefine Preuß: Tilla Willinger
- Jacob Matschenz: Sebastian Laux
- Volker Bruch: Otfried Willinger
- Friedrich von Thun: Koloman Laux
- Dietmar Bär: Veit Gürtler
- Sebastian Hülk: Rigobert Gürtler
- Ernst Stötzner: Vater Thomas
- Sven Pippig: Dieter
- Stipe Erceg: Gourdeville
- Lucas Gregorowicz: Graf Aymer
- Roeland Wiesnekker: Schmied Ambros
- Jiri Roskot: Hermann
- Lucas Prisor: Damian
- Uwe Preuss: Eckhard Willinger
- Carlo Ljubek: Manfred
- Tómas Lemarquis: Sepp
- Laura de Boer: Felicia de Béarn
