= Stipe Erceg =

German/Croatian actor

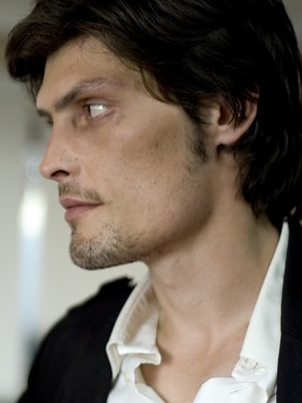
- Erceg in the film Little Paris
- Born: 30 October 1974 (age 52); Split, SR Croatia, SFR Yugoslavia
- Occupation: Actor

Stipe Erceg (German pronunciation: [ˈstiːpə ˈɛɐ̯t͡sək]; born 30 October 1974) is a German/Croatian actor. He is notable for playing the role of Peter in the 2004 Hans Weingartner film The Edukators alongside Daniel Brühl and Julia Jentsch, as well as the role of Holger Meins in The Baader Meinhof Complex.

Erceg was born in Split, SR Croatia, Yugoslavia. He moved from Croatia to Tübingen, Germany, with his parents in 1978 and studied acting at Europäisches Theaterinstitut Berlin from 1996 to 2000.

As of 2010, Erceg lives with his wife and two children in Berlin, where he moved in 1996.

== Awards ==
Stipe Erceg has won three awards throughout his career.

Year	Award	Film
2004	Max Ophüls Festival, Best Young Actor	Yugotrip
2004	Munich Film Festival, Male Acting	The Edukators (Die fetten Jahre sind vorbei)
2012	Hessischer Fernsehpreis, Male Acting	Blaubeerblau

== Filmography ==
- Kiki+Tiger (2003)
- Der Typ (2003)
- Yugotrip (2004)
- The Edukators (2004)
- Dont Look For Me (2004)
- Puca (2005)
- Hunt for Justice (2005)
- Crash Test Dummies (2005)
- Ich sehe was, was Du nicht siehst... (2005)
- Berlin Stories (2005)
- The Ring Finger (2005)
- Nothing but Ghosts (2006)
- Cutting Edge (2007)
- The Baader Meinhof Complex (2008)
- The Bone Man (2009)
- Phatom Pain (2009)
- Johan Falk: Operation Näktergal (2009)
- Tiger Team: The Mountain of the 1000 Dragons (2010)
- The Albanian (2010)
- Unknown (2011)
- Hell (2011)
- Blaubeerblau (2011)
- The Fourth State (2012)
- Opération Libertad (2012)
- Dark Matter (2012)
- Vampire Sisters (2012)
- Robin Hood (2013)
- Alaska Johansson (2013)
- Seegrund. Ein Kluftingerkrimi (2013)
- Die Pilgerin (2014)
- Vampire Sisters 2: Bats in the Belly (2014)
- Buddha's Little Finger (2015)
- Kommissar Marthaler – Ein allzu schönes Mädchen (2015)
- Kommissar Marthaler – Engel des Todes (2015)
- Taxi (2015)
- Hidden Reserves (2016)
- Home Is Here (2016)
- Allein gegen die Zeit – Der Film (2016)
- The Big Beef (2016)
- Vampire Sisters 3: Journey to Transylvania (2016)
- Letzte Spur Berlin (2017)
- Honigfrauen (2017)
- Culpa – Niemand ist ohne Schuld (2017)
- Trakehnerblut (2017)
- Vienna Blood – The Devil's Kiss (2021)
