= Barefoot (2005 film) =

2005 film

- Theatrical release poster
- Directed by: Til Schweiger
- Screenplay by: Til Schweiger; Jann Preuss
- Produced by: Til Schweiger; Tom Zickler
- Starring: Til Schweiger; Johanna Wokalek; Nadja Tiller; Michael Mendl; Imogen Kogge; Steffen Wink; Alexandra Neldel
- Cinematography: Christof Wahl
- Edited by: Constantin von Seld; Til Schweiger
- Music by: Dirk Reichardt; Stefan Hansen; Max Berghaus
- Production companies: Barefoot Films; Buena Vista International (Germany) Filmproduktion; Mr. Brown Entertainment
- Distributed by: Buena Vista International (Note: Distributed under the Touchstone Pictures banner.)
- Release date: 31 March 2005
- Running time: 118 minutes
- Country: Germany
- Language: German

Barefoot (German title Barfuss) is a 2005 romantic comedy film by German actor and director Til Schweiger. It tells the story of Nick (Schweiger), a hedonistic bachelor, who helps and eventually falls in love with Leila, an escaped psychiatric patient portrayed by Johanna Wokalek. Schweiger also co-wrote the screenplay, which is based on American screenwriter Stephen Zotnowski's original screenplay and story "Barefoot".

An American remake, Barefoot, was released in 2014.

== Plot ==
The life of Nick Keller can hardly be called well sorted. He stumbles from one temporary job to the next, and he has very serious problems with Heinrich, his rich and influential stepfather, as well as with his brother Viktor. Nick's latest temporary job is as a cleaner in a psychiatric clinic, where he prevents the barefooted patient Leila from committing suicide just as he is being fired from this latest employment.

Leila's story is also complex. The first nineteen years of her life she had been confined at home by her mother. She has been hospitalized in the clinic after her mother's death, but is desperate to leave. However, emotionally Leila is still a child. For example, everything that she is told, she takes literally; and she dislikes physical contact with strangers. The unexpected consequence of Nick's saving Leila from hanging herself is that Leila secretly follows her saviour, in her nightdress and once again barefooted; and she appears in front of his door that night. After Leila adamantly refuses go back to the clinic, she and Nick go on a road trip together in order to attend his brother's wedding to Nick's ex-girlfriend. During the trip the relationship between the two deepens significantly. However, after serious disputes with his family, Nick once again tries to hospitalize Leila. As a result, he has to confess to himself that he has fallen in love with her.

Nick is then arrested for attempted kidnapping, and Leila is brought back to the clinic. Nick pretends to have mental problems so he can go into the clinic with Leila, but only after Leila once again attempts suicide does her doctor admit him. The last scene shows them together shopping in a supermarket some months later, after their release from the clinic.

== Cast ==
- Til Schweiger as Nick Keller
- Johanna Wokalek as Leila
- Nadja Tiller as Frau Keller
- Steffen Wink as Viktor Keller
- Michael Mendl as Heinrich Keller
- Alexandra Neldel as Janine
- Imogen Kogge as Dr. Blöchinger
- Janine Kunze as Sarah Sommer
- Stefanie Stappenbeck as Jessica
- Axel Stein as Truck driver
- Markus Maria Profitlich as Car dealer 1
- Mark Keller as Car dealer 2
- Éric Judor as L'homme

== Critical response ==
The film was generally well received and was awarded the German Media Award Bambi as the best German film of 2005.
