= Kokowääh 2 =

- Theatrical release poster
- Directed by: Til Schweiger
- Written by: Til Schweiger; Béla Jarzyk
- Produced by: Til Schweiger; Thomas Zickler; Béla Jarzyk
- Starring: Til Schweiger; Emma Schweiger; Jasmin Gerat; Samuel Finzi
- Cinematography: Adrian Cranage; Erik Lee Steingröver
- Edited by: Constantin von Seld
- Music by: Dirk Reichardt; Martin Todsharow
- Production companies: Barefoot Films; Béla Jarzyk Production; Warner Bros. Film Productions Germany
- Distributed by: Warner Bros. Pictures
- Release date: 7 February 2013
- Running time: 123 minutes
- Country: Germany
- Language: German
- Budget: €5 million

Kokowääh 2 is a 2013 German film directed by Til Schweiger. It is a sequel to the 2011 film Kokowääh. It was released in German-speaking countries (Germany, Austria and Switzerland) on 7 February 2013. The film stars Til Schweiger, his daughter Emma Schweiger, Jasmin Gerat and Samuel Finzi reprising their roles from the first film.

== Plot ==
Two years have passed since Henry, Katharina, Tristan and Magdalena became a family. Just when they think that everything has returned to normal, chaos breaks out. Henry begins a career as a film producer; for his first project, he must work with eccentric young actor Matthias Schweighöfer. Meanwhile, Katharina is struggling with her role as a housewife and mother to baby Louis. In an attempt to save her marriage and rediscover herself, she moves into her own apartment. When Charlotte accepts a job abroad, Tristan faces a midlife crisis in the form of a young new girlfriend, Anna. He moves in with Henry, and the pair quickly become overwhelmed at the prospect of full responsibility for Louis and Magdalena. They decide to hire an attractive live-in nanny to help them out, which threatens Henry's possibility at a second chance with Katharina. During all of this, Magdalena develops romantic interest in a boy for the first time.

== Cast ==
- Til Schweiger as Henry
- Matthias Schweighöfer as himself
- Emma Schweiger as Magdalena
- Jasmin Gerat as Katharina
- Samuel Finzi as Tristan
- Maurizio Magno as Nick
- Nico Liersch as Max
- Julia Jentsch as Mother Max
- Anna-Katharina Samsel as Nanny

== Reception ==
Ronny Dombrowski from Cinetastic gave the film a 6 out of a possible 10, with much praise to Emma Schweiger for being the "secret star" of the movie.

== Trivia ==
- The movie title stands for Coq au vin, the only meal that Henry can cook.
- Til Schweiger chose the song "Hall of Fame" by the Irish rock band The Script (featuring will.i.am) for the title song of the movie. The film music comes from the Finnish post-hardcore band Disco Ensemble.
- The shooting of the movie was to take place from 2 August 2012 to 1 October 2012. The movie was shot in Berlin and Brandenburg.
