= Til Schweiger =

German actor (born 1963)

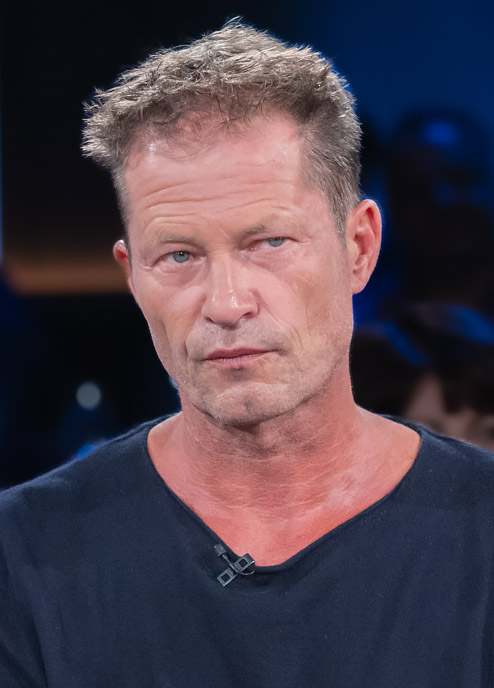
- Schweiger in 2022
- Born: Tilman Valentin Schweiger; 19 December 1963 (age 62); Freiburg, West Germany
- Occupations: Actor; filmmaker
- Years active: 1989–present
- Spouse: Dana Carlsen (m. 1995; div. 2014)
- Children: 4, including Luna, Lilli and Emma
- Website: til-schweiger.com

Tilman Valentin Schweiger (German pronunciation: [tɪl ˈʃvaɪɡɐ]; born 19 December 1963) is a German actor and filmmaker. He became known in the 1990s for films such as Manta, Manta, Der bewegte Mann and Knockin' on Heaven's Door. He went on to star in international film productions such as Inglourious Basterds, Lara Croft: Tomb Raider – The Cradle of Life and King Arthur. He founded his own production company Barefoot Films. Films like Rabbit Without Ears, Rabbit Without Ears 2, Kokowääh and Head Full of Honey, in which he was director, producer and actor, drew large audiences, making Schweiger the most commercially successful German filmmaker.

== Early life ==
Schweiger was born in Freiburg, West Germany, to two teachers. He grew up in Heuchelheim near Giessen in Hesse, where he went to school. Later, he took acting lessons at Der Keller in Cologne.

== Career ==
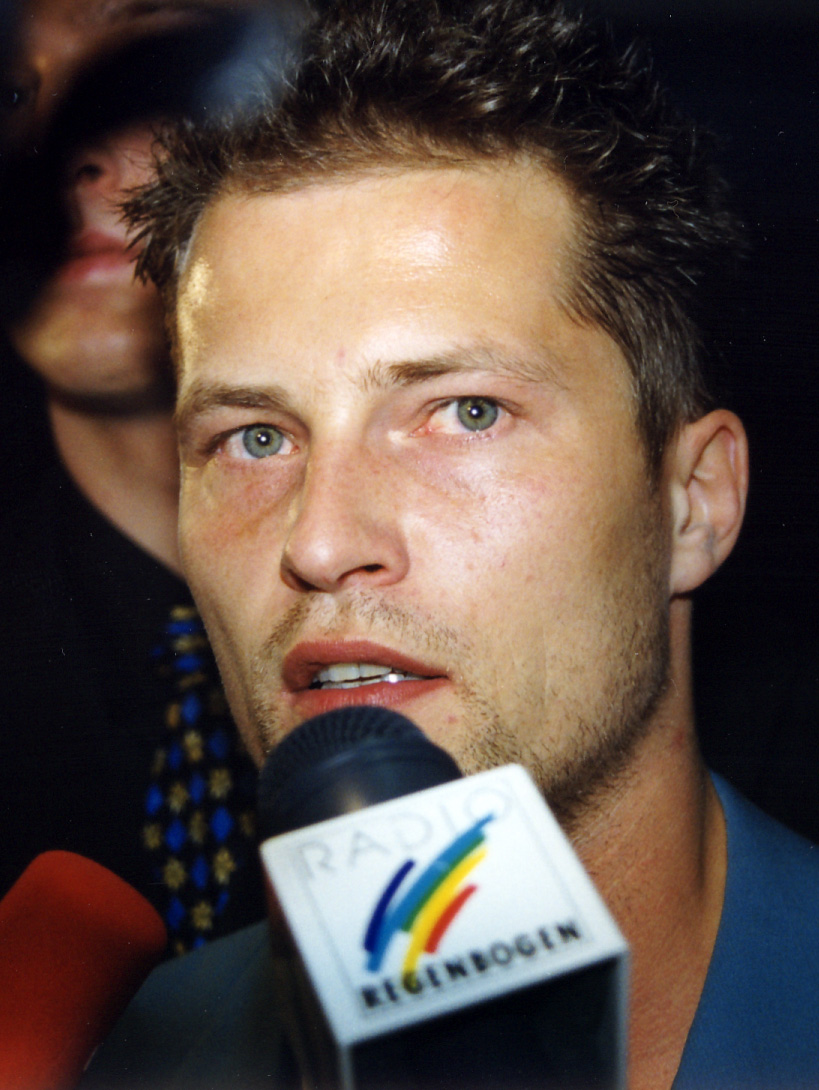
Schweiger in 1998

Schweiger's debut as a producer and (uncredited) director came in 1997 with Knockin' on Heaven's Door. He also directed and produced Der Eisbär (The Polar Bear) in 1998. Schweiger won a Bambi Award for Barfuss (Barefoot) in 2005, based on the original English screenplay "Barefoot" by Stephen Zotnowski, which he co-wrote, directed, and starred in. He also won a Bambi for his lead role in Traumschiff Surprise – Periode 1. In 2007, Keinohrhasen (this literally translates to "no ear rabbit" while the English title is Rabbit Without Ears), written, produced, and directed by Schweiger, became the most successful film in German theaters with a box office result of US$62 million. The film won a Bambi, a Bavarian Film Award, the German Comedy Award, two DIVA Awards, a Jupiter Award and the Ernst Lubitsch Award. The sequel, Zweiohrküken (Rabbit Without Ears 2, literally "two ear chicks"), was released the following year with over 4.2 million viewers and a box office collection of US$45 million. Schweiger then went on to direct, produce and star in 1½ Knights – In Search of the Ravishing Princess Herzelinde, which also proved a huge cinema hit on its release in 2008.

The movie Kokowääh debuted in German cinemas in February 2011. Schweiger's daughter Emma stars beside him, and the movie is also directed, co-written and produced by him. Schweiger and Emma reprised their roles as Henry and Magdalena, respectively, in its sequel, titled Kokowääh 2. The film was released on 7 February 2013. In 2012 Schweiger made a film alongside his daughter Luna named Schutzengel. In 2013, Schweiger also started to produce commercials with his daughters (Watchever, VHV Group).

Onscreen, Schweiger first appeared as an actor in 1989 in the TV series Lindenstraße. His first film role came in 1991 with Manta, Manta. Additional TV and film roles followed, including Der bewegte Mann (Maybe, Maybe Not), Männerpension (Jailbirds), Das Mädchen Rosemarie (A Girl Called Rosemary), Bastard (Bandyta), Der große Bagarozy (The Devil and Ms. D.), Was tun, wenn's brennt (What to Do in Case of Fire?), Les Daltons vs. Lucky Luke, The Red Baron, Wo ist Fred (Where is Fred?), Phantomschmerz (Phantom Pain), Männerherzen (Men in the City), and others.

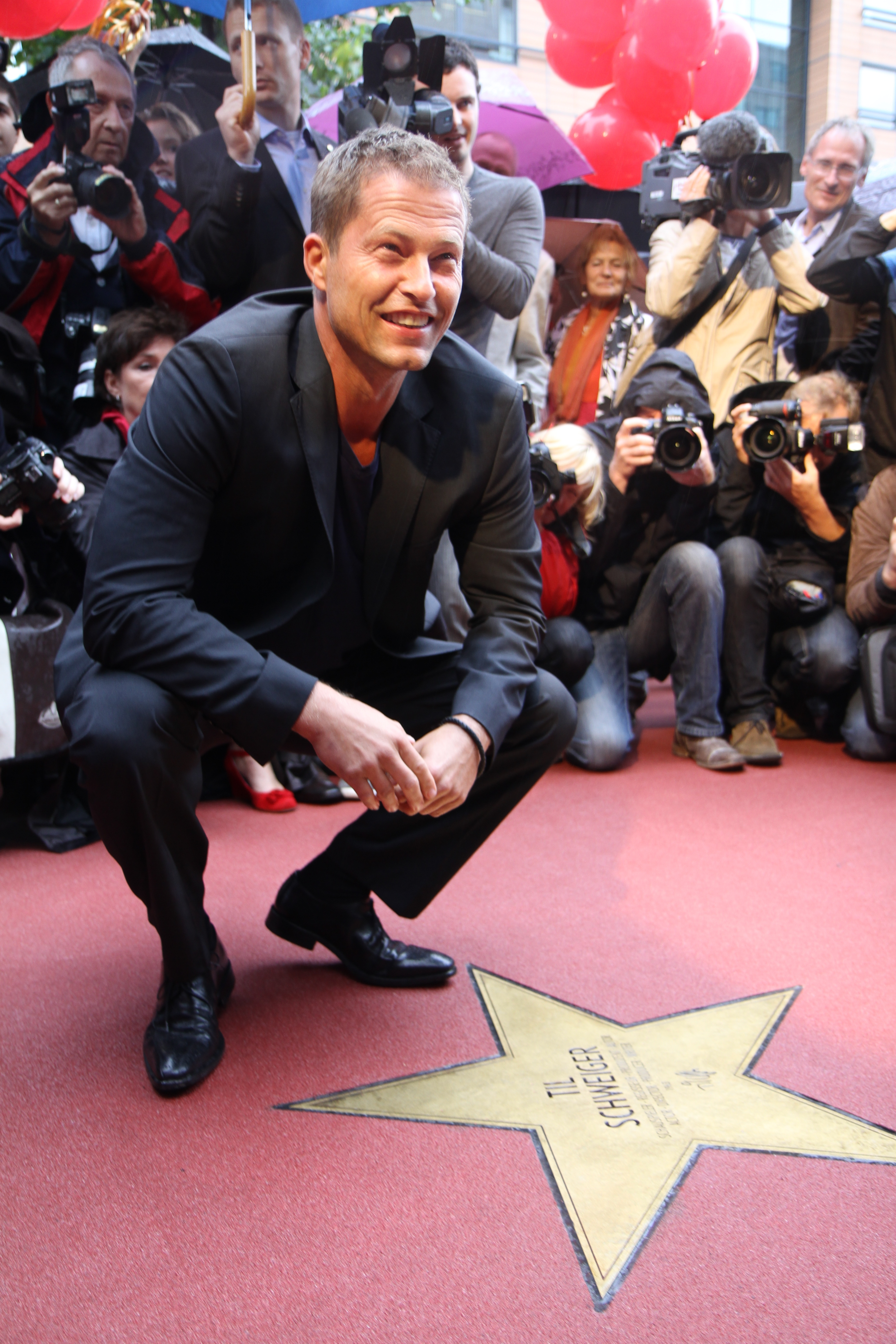
Schweiger at the 2011 Boulevard der Stars ceremony in Berlin

Schweiger has also appeared as a supporting actor in American films, including Already Dead, King Arthur, In Enemy Hands, Magicians, Lara Croft: Tomb Raider – The Cradle of Life, Driven, SLC Punk!, Investigating Sex, Joe and Max, The Replacement Killers and New Year's Eve. He wore a Nazi uniform for the first time in his career for his role in Inglourious Basterds but, as Quentin Tarantino revealed, "only because his character was killing Nazis."

Schweiger then appeared in the American productions The Courier with Mickey Rourke, This Means War (2012) with Chris Pine and Reese Witherspoon, and in 2013 as Darko in Charlie Countryman with Shia LaBeouf among others. He also made an appearance in 2014's Muppets Most Wanted, 2017's David Leitch's Atomic Blonde, and 2024's The Ministry of Ungentlemanly Warfare.

In November 2024, Til Schweiger took part in the filming of a promotional video about drift in Minsk (Belarus).

== Personal life ==
Schweiger married American model Dana Carlsen on 19 June 1995. They have four children: Valentin Florian Schweiger (born 1995), Luna Marie Schweiger (born 1997), Lilli Camille Schweiger (born 1998), and Emma Tiger Schweiger (born 2002). Schweiger and Carlsen separated in 2005 and were divorced in 2014.

Schweiger lives in Mallorca, Spain, and his neighbour is former German cyclist Jan Ullrich. In August 2018, Ullrich was arrested for allegedly breaking onto Schweiger's property and threatening him.

== Filmography ==
=== Film ===
Year	Film	Role	Language	Director	Notes
1991	Manta, Manta	Bertie	German	Wolfgang Büld	First film in which he was the lead actor
1993	Ebbie's Bluff	Rudy	German	Claude-Oliver Rudolph	Max-Ophüls-Preis Best Actor Newcomer Award
1994	Der bewegte Mann	Axel Feldheim	German	Sönke Wortmann	Bambi
1995	Bunte Hunde	Pepe Brenner	German	Lars Becker	
1996	Jailbirds	Steinbock	German	Detlev Buck	Bambi; DIVA-Award
1996	The Superwife	Hajo Heiermann	German	Sönke Wortmann	
1997	Knockin' on Heaven's Door	Martin Brest	German	Thomas Jahn	Also writer and producer 20th Moscow International Film Festival – Best Actor; Jupiter Best Actor; Goldene Kamera Best Actor
1997	Hercules	Hercules	English	John Musker; Ron Clements	Voice (German version, dubbed)
1997	Bastard	Brute	English	Maciej Dejczer	Polish Film Festival (Polish Oscar) Best Actor; Bravo Otto Best Actor
1998	The Replacement Killers	Ryker	English	Antoine Fuqua	
1998	Judas Kiss	Ruben Rubenbauer	English	Sebastian Gutierrez	
1998	SLC Punk!	Mark	English	James Merendino	
1998	The Polar Bear	Leo	German	Til Schweiger	Also producer
1999	The Devil and Ms. D	Stanislaus Nagy	German	Bernd Eichinger	
2000	Magicians	Max	English	James Merendino	
2001	Driven	Beau Brandenburg	English	Renny Harlin	
2001	Investigating Sex	Monty	English	Alan Rudolph	
2001	What to Do in Case of Fire?	Tim	German	Gregor Schnitzler	
2002	Joe and Max	Max Schmeling	English	Steve James	
2003	Lara Croft: Tomb Raider – The Cradle of Life	Sean	English	Jan de Bont	
2004	In Enemy Hands	Captain Jonas Herdt	English	Tony Giglio	
2004	King Arthur	Cynric	English	Antoine Fuqua	
2004	Traumschiff Surprise – Periode 1	Rock Fertig Aus	German	Michael Herbig	Bambi Best Actor
2004	Les Dalton	Lucky Luke	French	Philippe Haïm	
2005	Barefoot	Nick Keller	German	Til Schweiger	Also writer and producer Bambi Best Film
2005	Deuce Bigalow: European Gigolo	Heinz Hummer the Gigolo with the most below	English	Mike Bigelow	
2006	Bye Bye Harry!	Gantcho	English	Robert Young	
2006	The Trip to Panama	Kleiner Tiger	German	Martin Otevrel	Voice
2006	One Way	Eddie Schneider	English	Reto Salimbeni	Also producer
2006	Where Is Fred?	Fred Krüppers	German	Anno Saul	Jupiter Best Actor
2007	Body Armour	John Ridley	English	Gerry Lively	
2007	Rabbit Without Ears	Ludo Decker	German	Til Schweiger	Also writer and producer Ernst-Lubitsch-Preis Best Comedy; Bambi Best Film; Deutscher Comedypreis Best Comedy; Jupiter Best Film; 2x DIVA-Award Best Film
2007	Already Dead	The Man	English	Joe Otting	
2008	The Red Baron	Werner Voss	English	Nikolai Müllerschön	Bravo Otto
2008	Far Cry	Jack Carver	English	Uwe Boll	
2008	1½ Knights – In Search of the Ravishing Princess Herzelinde	Ritter Lanze	German	Til Schweiger	Also producer
2009	Phantom Pain	Marc	German	Matthias Emcke	
2009	Inglourious Basterds	Sgt. Hugo Stiglitz	English; French; German	Quentin Tarantino	Screen Actors Guild Award for Outstanding Performance by a Cast in a Motion Picture
2009	Men in the City	Jerome Ades	German	Simon Verhoeven	
2009	Rabbit Without Ears 2	Ludo Decker	German	Til Schweiger	Also writer and producer Deutscher Comedypreis Best Comedy
2011	Kokowääh	Henry	German	Til Schweiger	Also writer and producer
2011	The Three Musketeers	Cagliostro	English	Paul W. S. Anderson	
2011	Men in the City 2	Jerome	German	Simon Verhoeven	
2011	New Year's Eve	James Schwab	English	Garry Marshall	
2012	This Means War	Heinrich	English	McG	
2012	The Courier	FBI agent	English	Hany Abu-Assad	
2012	Guardians	Max	German	Til Schweiger	Also producer
2013	Charlie Countryman	Darko	English	Fredrik Bond	
2013	Kokowääh 2	Henry	German	Til Schweiger	Also writer and producer
2013	No-Eared Bunny and Two-Eared Chick	No-Eared Bunny	German	Til Schweiger	Also writer and producer
2014	Muppets Most Wanted	German Cop	English	James Bobin	
2014	Head Full of Honey	Niko Rosenbach	German	Til Schweiger	
2016	Tschiller: Off Duty	Nick Tschiller	German	Christian Alvart	
2016	Vier gegen die Bank	Chris	German	Wolfgang Petersen	
2017	Atomic Blonde	The Watchmaker	English	David Leitch	
2018	Hot Dog	Luke Steiner	German	Torsten Künstler	
2018	Klassentreffen 1.0	Thomas	German	Til Schweiger	Remake of The Reunion
2018	Head Full of Honey	London Restaurant Waiter	English	Til Schweiger	English-language remake
2020	The Wedding	Thomas	German	Til Schweiger	Also writer and producer
2021	The Salvation of The World as We Know It	Hardy	German	Til Schweiger	Also writer and producer
2022	Medieval	Henry III of Rosenberg	English	Petr Jákl	
2023	Manta, Manta: Legacy	Bertie	German	Til Schweiger	
2023	Das Beste Kommt Noch!	Felix	German	Til Schweiger	
2024	The Ministry of Ungentlemanly Warfare	Heinrich Luhr	English	Guy Ritchie	

=== Television ===
Year	TV Show	Role	Director	Notes
1989–1992	Lindenstraße	Jo Zenker		37 episodes
1994	Lemgo	Jan Peters	Jörg Grünler	
1994–1996	Die Kommissarin	Nick Siegel		26 episodes
1996	Adrenalin	Stefan Renner	Dominique Othenin-Girard	
1996	A Girl Called Rosemary	Nadler	Bernd Eichinger	
1996	Teenage Wolfpack	Freddy	Urs Egger	
2002	Joe and Max	Max Schmeling	Steve James	
2013–2016	Tatort	Nick Tschiller	Christian Alvart	Tatort in Hamburg (4 episodes)
2020	Tatort: Tschill Out	Nick Tschiller	Eoin Moore	Tatort
2022	Pitch Perfect: Bumper in Berlin	Pickle Host #1	Richie Keen	Episode: "Verschlimmbessern"

== Awards ==
- 1994: Bambi for Der bewegte Mann
- 1995: Bambi for Jailbirds
- 1997: Preis des Gdynia Film Festival for Bastard as Best Actor
- 1998: Bravo Otto as Best Actor
- 1998: Goldene Kamera for Knockin' on Heaven's Door as Best Actor
- 2003: Hessischer Kulturpreis
- 2008: Jupiter for Wo ist Fred? as Best German Actor
- 2008: Ehren-Bravo Otto
- 2008: Bambi for Keinohrhasen as Best National Film
- 2008: Deutscher Comedypreis for Keinohrhasen as Best Theatrical Comedy Film
- 2009: Jupiter for Keinohrhasen
- 2009: 2x DIVA-Award for Keinohrhasen
- 2010: Deutscher Comedypreis for Zweiohrküken as Best Theatrical Comedy Film
- 2011: Deutscher Comedypreis for the Most Successful German Comedy Film: Kokowääh
- 2011: Querdenker-Award
- 2012: Jupiter for Kokowääh as Best Actor
- 2013: Deutscher Comedypreis for the Most Successful German Comedy Film: Kokowääh 2
- 2015: Romy in the categories Best Direction and Best Production in a Theatrical Film for Honig im Kopf
- 2015: Deutscher Filmpreis in the category Most Popular Film for Honig im Kopf
- 2015: CIVIS-Publikumspreis for Honig im Kopf
- 2015: Deutscher Comedypreis for the Most Successful German Comedy Film: Honig im Kopf
- 2015: Bambi for Honig im Kopf in the category Ehrenpreis der Jury
- 2020: Golden Eye Award of the Zurich Film Festival
