= Martin Todsharow =

German composer, producer and lecturer on music

Martin Todsharow (born 6 September 1967) is a German composer, producer, and lecturer on music, since 2004 a professor at the Konrad Wolf Film University of Babelsberg.

He has won the German Film Critics' Best Music Award and the German Music Authors' Prize for Film Music Composition.

== Early life ==
Born in Berlin, from 1989 to 1994 Todsharow was a student at the Hanns Eisler Academy of Music in Berlin, where his degree was in piano, counterpoint, and composition.

== Career ==
Since 1991 Todsharow has composed for theatre. In 1993 he was awarded a foreign scholarship of the DAAD Artists-in-Berlin Program to study in Britain. From 1994 to 1996 he was an instrumentalist in both serious and pop music. Since 1997 he has worked as a professional film composer, a producer, a music supervisor, and a lecturer at film academies . In 2004 he was elected to a chair at the Konrad Wolf Film University of in Potsdam-Babelsberg.

In 2013 he won the Preis der deutschen Filmkritik Best Music Award for Sources of Life (Quellen des Lebens). In 2014 he received the German Music Authors' Prize for Film Music Composition, in a ceremony on 8 May 2014 at the Ritz-Carlton Hotel, Berlin.

== Work as film composer ==
- No Place to Go (2000)
- Hijack Stories (2000)
- Tattoo (2002)
- Angst (2003)
- Eierdiebe (2003)
- Agnes and His Brothers (2004)
- Guys and Balls (2004)
- Minotaur (2006)
- Atomised (2006)
- Mogadischu (2008)
- Lulu and Jimi (2009)
- Hilde (2009)
- Phantom Pain (2009)
- Desert Flower (2009)
- Jew Suss: Rise and Fall (2010)
- Kokowääh (2011)
- Guardians (2012)
- Kokowääh 2 (2013)
- Sources of Life (2013)
- 3096 Days (2013)
- Frau Ella (2013)
- Joy of Fatherhood (2014)
- Head Full of Honey (2014)
- Frau Müller muss weg! (2015)
- Friend Request (2016)
- Fog in August (2016)
- The Captain (2017)
- Hot Dog (2018)
- Herrliche Zeiten (2018)
- Klassentreffen 1.0 (2018)
- Head Full of Honey (2018)
- The Tunnel (2019)
- Enfant Terrible (2020)
- Snake Eyes (2021)
- Locked-in Society (2022)
- Seneca – On the Creation of Earthquakes (2023)
- Manta, Manta: Legacy (2023)
