= Skutnik =

Skutnik is a family name of Romanian origin, derived from the historical term scutnic.

== People ==
- Lenny Skutnik, United States hero
- Ed Skutnik, the owner of Radio Skutnik

== Other usages ==
- Lenny Skutniks, notable people who, as an honor, are invited to sit in the gallery at joint meeting of Congress
- Radio Skutnik, a former broadcasting company in Massachusetts
