= Flight 90: Disaster on the Potomac =

1984 American telefilm

- Genre: Drama
- Based on: Air Florida Flight 90
- Screenplay by: John McGreevey
- Directed by: Robert Michael Lewis
- Music by: Gil Mellé
- Country of origin: United States
- Original language: English

Production
- Executive producer: Sheldon Pinchuk
- Producers: Bill Finnegan; Patricia Finnegan
- Production location: Los Angeles
- Cinematography: Fred J. Koenekamp
- Editors: Bernard Balmath; Byron "Buzz" Brandt
- Running time: 90 minutes
- Production company: Finnegan/Pinchuk Productions

Original release
- Network: NBC
- Release: April 1, 1984

Flight 90: Disaster on the Potomac is a 1984 made-for-television drama film about Air Florida Flight 90 that crashed into the Potomac River in 1982; the plane was carrying 74 passengers and five crew members. Four passengers and one crew member (a flight attendant) were rescued from the crash and survived.

== Plot ==
The film introduces the people whose lives will, on January 13, 1982, intersect on Air Florida Flight 90 from Washington, D.C. to Fort Lauderdale, Florida. Marilyn Nichols, a stewardess, has just learned she is pregnant. Priscilla Tirado and her husband Jose are leaving for Florida to take up a new job. Nikki Felch is going on a trip with her boss, Joe Stiley, to Alabama, but her boyfriend David Frank wants to get married. Bert Hamilton is going on a business trip to Florida, but would rather stay with his wife and son. Roger Olian is a maintenance man at St. Elizabeths Hospital, married to Donna, who works in the Naval Recruitment Office. Arland D. Williams, Jr. is also flying to Florida to close a bank for the Federal Reserve and is expecting to meet his fiancée Carol Biggs in Georgia. Marilyn, flight attendant Kelly Duncan, and the plane, Boeing 737-222, leave Florida and fly to Washington. They land at Washington National Airport in a blinding snowstorm. After the passengers board the plane, they must sit for 50 minutes.

This causes ice to accumulate on the plane. Most passengers ignore the stewardesses' safety talk. The de-icing that is done is done improperly. Pilots Larry Wheaton and Roger Pettit seemed unconcerned about ice on the wings. When the plane tries to take off, ice on the sensors causes the pilots to have a false idea of their speed. The plane only attains 352 feet altitude before it stalls. The plane hits the 14th Street Bridge and crashes into the Potomac River. Bert, Joe, Nikki, Priscilla, Kelly and Arland make it out of the plane and cling to a piece of wreckage in the freezing river. Roger Olian, who was on the bridge, plunges into the river to try to help. Meanwhile, friends and relatives learn about the crash. Donald Usher and Melvin Windsor take off in their helicopter; Roger gets close enough to shout encouragement to the survivors. The helicopter rescues Bert and soon they return try to catch Arland, but passes the rescue line to Kelly. They pull Olian out of the river. Each time he is offered the rope, Arland passes it on to Joe, Nikki and Priscilla. Joe is pulled to shore, while a stranger, Lenny Skutnik, jumps in and pulls Priscilla to shore. By the time Nikki is rescued, the rescue team returns to the crash site and see Arland has slipped beneath the water and dies.

In Florida, Air Florida employees pass the bad news to Marilyn's husband Larry that she has died. The survivors start to come to terms with what happened as they are sent to different hospitals and are reunited with their loved ones.

== Production ==
Lenny Skutnik was offered about $1,500 for the rights to his story for the television movie, but turned it down.

== Cast ==
- Jeanetta Arnette as Patricia 'Nikki' Felch
- Richard Backus as Larry Nichols
- Burke Byrnes as Senior First Officer
- K Callan as Barbara Hamilton
- Larry Cedar as Jordan Hamilton
- Barry Corbin as Bert Hamilton
- Robert Factor as Lenny Skutnik
- Robert Jayne as Glenn Biggs
- Jane Kaczmarek as Donna Olian
- Kerrie Keane as Carole Biggs
- Chad Lowe as Al Hamilton
- Stephen Macht as Joe Stiley
- Dinah Manoff as Priscilla Tirado
- Richard Masur as Roger Olian
- Jack Murdock as Mr. Farrell
- Ken Olin as David Frank
- Donnelly Rhodes as Arland D. Williams Jr.
- Jamie Rose as Marilyn Nichols
- Connie Sawyer as Josie Keefer
- Kate Vernon as Donna Adams
- James Whitmore Jr. as Captain Larry Wheaton
- Kathleen Wilhoite as Kelly Duncan

== Accolades ==
The movie was nominated for the Outstanding Film Sound Editing for a Limited Series or a Special and the Outstanding Film Sound Mixing For a Limited Series or a Special at the 36th Primetime Emmy Awards.

Accolades for Flight 90: Disaster on the Potomac
| Year | Ceremony | Award | Recipients | Ref. |
|---|---|---|---|---|
| 1984 | Primetime Emmy Awards | Outstanding Film Sound Editing for a Limited Series or a Special | Sam Black; Douglas Gray; Mace Matiosian; John Mick; R. William A. Thiederman; David Whittaker; William Wistrom | |
| 1984 | Primetime Emmy Awards | Outstanding Film Sound Mixing For a Limited Series or a Special | Mel Metcalfe; Don Minkler; William Randall; R. William A. Thiederman | |
