= Donnelly Rhodes =

Canadian actor (1937–2018)

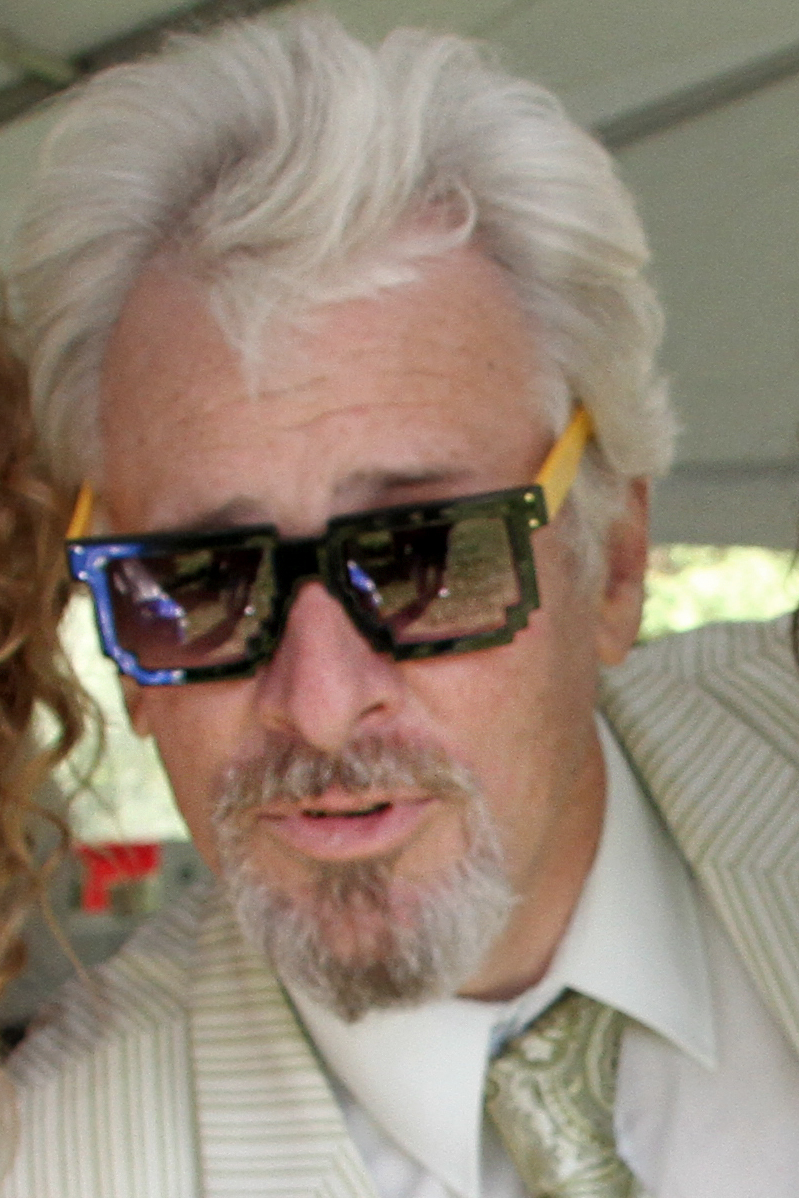
- Rhodes in 2012
- Born: Donnelly Rhodes Henry; December 4, 1937; Winnipeg, Manitoba, Canada
- Died: January 8, 2018 (aged 80); Maple Ridge, British Columbia, Canada
- Education: National Theatre School of Canada
- Occupation: Actor
- Years active: 1956–2017
- Spouses: Martha Buhs (m. 1962; div. 1965) Virginia Haxall Harrison (m. 1966; div. 1970) Maggie Thrett (m. 1975; div. 1977) Diane Dewey (m. 1978, divorced) Sarah Wilson (m. 2011)
- Children: 2

Donnelly Rhodes Henry (December 4, 1937 – January 8, 2018) was a Canadian actor. He was known to Canadian audiences as Sgt. Nick Raitt on CBC TV's Sidestreet (1975–78), Grant "Doc" Roberts on Danger Bay (1984–90), and Det. Leo Shannon on Da Vinci's Inquest (1998–2005). He also had many American television and film credits, notably as the hapless escaped convict Dutch Leitner on the soap opera spoof Soap (1978–81), Phillip Chancellor II on the daytime soap The Young and the Restless (1974–75, 1978–81), and Doctor Cottle ("Doc") on Battlestar Galactica (2004–09).

Rhodes won a Gemini Award for Best Actor in a Continuing Leading Dramatic Role for his performance on Da Vinci's Inquest, with three additional nominations. He received the Earle Grey Award in 2006.

== Early life and education ==
Rhodes was born in Winnipeg, Manitoba in 1937. His mother, Ann Henry, was a playwright. He served in the Royal Canadian Air Force as a mechanic, and studied at the Royal Manitoba Theatre Centre and the National Theatre School of Canada. After graduating in 1963, he joined the Stratford Festival.

== Career ==
A large portion of Rhodes' career consists of guest-starring roles in American television. He appeared twice on Laredo: in 1965, he played Bob Jamison in "Rendezvous at Arillo" and played a lead role in "The Trap", an episode on The Alfred Hitchcock Hour. The next year, Rhodes was cast in "The Would-Be Gentleman of Laredo" as Don Carlos. In 1966, he appeared as Red Eagle in the episode "Pariah" of the Universal Television series The Road West. The same year, he guest-starred on Dundee and the Culhane.

Rhodes appeared in three episodes of the original Mission: Impossible (1966-73 TV series), in the Season 3 episode, "The Freeze" (1968), in the Season 4 episode, "Mastermind" (1969), and in the Season 7 episode, "Ultimatum" (1972). He also played the main card player, Macon, who threatens the Sundance Kid (Robert Redford) in the opening scene of Butch Cassidy and the Sundance Kid (1969). In 1973, Rhodes co-starred in an episode of the sci-fi drama The Starlost (episode 12, 'The Implant People'). He played Phillip Chancellor II in The Young and the Restless from 1974-75, and from 1978-81, he played escaped convict Dutch Leitner on Soap.

In 1980, Rhodes played a priest in the miniseries The Chisholms. In 1982, he played Leo, a bar patron on Cheers. In 1983 he appeared as Wilson Arthur MacLeish on Magnum P.I. on the episode "Of Sound Mind". In 1984, he had a supporting role as the beleaguered father in the short-lived TV series Double Trouble and appeared as Arland D. Williams Jr. in the television movie Flight 90: Disaster on the Potomac. From 1985 to 1990, he played Dr. Grant Roberts in the series Danger Bay. In 1987, he made a guest appearance on The Golden Girls as Jake Smollens, a handsome, rough-around-the-edges caterer.

In 1988, Rhodes guest-starred on Empty Nest as Leonard, an old friend of the main character. In 1991 he played the "Prodigal Father" in an episode of Murder, She Wrote. He starred as ruthless corporate lawyer R.J. Williams during the 1991-92 season of the drama Street Legal. In 1993, Rhodes played Jim Parker in "Shapes" (Season 1, episode 19) of The X-Files. He would later return to the series in 1996 in a different role for Musings of a Cigarette Smoking Man (Season 4, episode 7).

For seven years (1998-2005), Rhodes played the role of Detective Leo Shannon on the acclaimed CBC television series, Da Vinci's Inquest. He played the character Milash in an episode of Smallville in 2008. On the revived Battlestar Galactica (2004–2009), Rhodes played Chief Medical Officer Sherman Cottle who smoked cigarettes in most scenes. Most recently Rhodes played Mr. Decker, Rufus Decker's father, in the two seasons of The Romeo Section on CBC in 2015-16.

Rhodes' film appearances were fewer, including roles in Gunfight in Abilene (1967), Butch Cassidy and the Sundance Kid (1969), Change of Mind (1969), The Neptune Factor (1973), Goldenrod (1976), Oh! Heavenly Dog (1980), Urban Safari (1995), and Tron: Legacy (2010).

In February 2009, the Union of British Columbia Performers honoured Rhodes with the Sam Payne Award for Lifetime Achievement.

=== Radio work ===
Rhodes provided the voice of the US president at the start of each episode of the CBC Radio One space opera/comedy series Canadia: 2056.

== Death ==
Rhodes died of cancer at the Baillie House Hospice in Maple Ridge, British Columbia at the age of 80.

== Filmography ==
=== Film ===
Year	Title	Role	Notes
1956	Reprisal!	Buck	
1957	The 27th Day	Television Technician	Uncredited
1967	Gunfight in Abilene	Joe Slade	Uncredited
1969	Butch Cassidy and the Sundance Kid	Macon	
1969	Change of Mind	Roger Morrow	
1973	The Neptune Factor	Bob Cousins	
1973	The Hard Part Begins	Jim King	
1976	Goldenrod	Keno McLaughlin	
1980	Oh! Heavenly Dog	Montanero	
1989	The Penthouse	Lt. Valeri	
1991	The Legend of Kootenai Brown	'McTooth'	
1996	Urban Safari	Harry	
2001	Touched by a Killer	Bernie Gordon	
2002	Pressure	Sheriff Miles Cooper	
2002	Snow Dogs	Race Official #1	
2009	Damage	Deacon	
2010	Ramona and Beezus	Crusty Photographer	
2010	Hunt to Kill	Sheriff Westlake	
2010	Tron: Legacy	Grandpa Flynn	
2011	Marley & Me: The Puppy Years	Fred Grogan	
2012	Barricade	Sheriff Howes	

=== Television ===
Year	Title	Role	Notes
1960	Bonanza	Latigo / Little Henchman	Episodes: "San Francisco" & "The Mission"
1964–65	The Alfred Hitchcock Hour	John Cochran	Episodes: "The Trap," "Ten Minutes From Now"
1965	Wagon Train	Jeremiah Stewart	Episode: "The Wanda Snow Story"
1965–66	Laredo	Don Carlos, Bob Jamison	2 episodes
1966	The Road West	Red Eagle	Episode: "Pariah"
1966	The Virginian	Ben Colby	Episode: "The Wolves Up Front, the Jackals Behind"
1967	Custer	War Cloud	Episode: "Dangerous Prey"
1967	Mannix	Ramon Verona	Episode: "The Cost Of A Vacation"
1967	Dundee and the Culhane	Michael	Episode: "The Vasquez Brief"
1967	Tarzan	Hank	Episode: "Hotel Hurricane"
1967	The Wild Wild West	Captain Dansby	Episode: "The Night of the Legion of Death" S3 E12
1968–72	Mission: Impossible	Joel Morgan / Lou Merrick / Raymond Barret	3 episodes
1973	The Starlost	Roloff	"The Implant People"
1978–81	Soap	Dutch Leitner	38 episodes (Season 2-4)
1979	The New Adventures of Wonder Woman	Ward Selkirk	Episode: "A Date with Doomsday"
1980	The Chisholms	Franciscan priest	Episode: "The Siren Song"
1982	Report to Murphy	Charlie	6 episodes
1982	Cheers	Leo	Episode: "Sam's Women"
1982	The Facts of Life	Sal Largo	Episode: "Jo's Cousin"
1982	Taxi	Angelo (Tony's father)	Episode: "Travels with My Dad"
1982–83	Hill Street Blues	Judge Paul Grogin	4 episodes
1983	Magnum PI	Wilson Arthur MacLeish	Episode: "Of Sound Mind"
1983	Gimme a Break!	Mayor	Episode: "The Centerfold: Part 2"
1983	Amanda's	Mr. Johnson	Episode: "You Were Meant for Me"
1984	Alice	Frank	Episode: "Tommy Goes Overboard"
1984	Flight 90: Disaster on the Potomac	Arland D. Williams Jr.	TV movie
1984–85	Double Trouble	Art Foster	9 episodes
1985–90	Danger Bay	Dr. Grant Roberts	122 episodes
1987	The Golden Girls	Jake Smollens	Episode: "Diamond in the Rough"
1987	After The Promise	Dr. Northfield	TV movie
1988	Empty Nest	Leonard	Episode: "Harry's Friend"
1988–93	Murder, She Wrote	Various roles	3 episodes
1989	Bordertown	John Quincy McGraw	1 episode: "Keenan's Raiders"
1991–92	Street Legal	R.J. Williams	10 episodes
1993	The X-Files	Jim Parker	Episode: "Shapes"
1996, 1997	The Outer Limits	Senator, General James Eiger	2 episodes
1997	Millennium	Peter Dumont	Episode: "Broken World"
1997	The Sentinel	Don Dominick Lazar	Episode: "Inside Man"
1997	Indefensible: The Truth About Edward Brannigan	Jack Bailey	TV movie
1998	The Young and the Restless	Phillip Chancellor II	2 episodes
1998–2005	Da Vinci's Inquest	Leo Shannon	91 episodes
1999	Hope Island	Jake Mitchum	Episode: "Look One Way and Row Another"
2000	Call of the Wild	Thadeus P. Rossmore	Episode: "Betrayal"
2004–09	Battlestar Galactica	Dr. Sherman Cottle	36 episodes
2005, 2013	Supernatural	Father Simon, Mr. Shaw	2 episodes
2006	Whistler	Daniel Wallace	Episode: "In the Air"
2007	Psych	Judge Horace Leland	Episode: "Cloudy... With a Chance of Murder"
2008	Smallville	Milash	Episode: "Quest"
2008	The L Word	Colonel Jon Smythe	Episode: "Lesbians Gone Wild"
2010	Human Target	Guerrero's Friend	Episode: "Pilot"
2010	Heartland	Eli Stark	Episode: "The Slippery Slope"
2010	Goblin	Charlie	TV movie
2013	Arctic Air	Virgil Haggard	Episode: "Skeletons in the Closet"
2013	Mr. Hockey: The Gordie Howe Story	NHL Lawyer	TV movie
2015–16	The Romeo Section	Mr. Decker	2 episodes
2016	The Flash	Agent Smith	Episode: "Invasion!" (crossover episode)
2016	Legends of Tomorrow	Agent Smith	Episode: "Invasion!" (crossover episode)
