= Scutelnic =

Peasant servants in Wallachia and Moldova

Scutelnic (also scutnic, from Romanian verb scuti, "to exempt", "to absolve"; plural: scitelnici, scutnici) were peasant servants in Wallachia and Moldova who were exempt from state taxes. They were charged with various duties and were attached to boiers (land owners with military or administrative functions) and to monasteries.

The category of scutelnici was introduced by the reforms of Constantine Mavrocordatos. It was abolished in Bessarabia after the region was annexed by the Russian Empire on April 29, 1818 by the Statute on the Establishment of the Bessarabian Oblast.

The term is preserved in various names, such as the family names Skutnik, Skutelnik (alternative transliterations of the word from Cyrillic) and the settlement Scutelnici.
