= Urban Safari =

- Directed by: Reto Salimbeni
- Written by: Reto Salimbeni; James Desmarais
- Produced by: Michael Collier
- Starring: David Naughton; Linda Kash; Andrea Nemeth; Donnelly Rhodes
- Cinematography: Vic Sarin
- Edited by: Jana Fritsch
- Music by: Brahm Wenger
- Release date: 1996
- Running time: 92 min
- Country: Switzerland
- Language: English

Urban Safari is a 1996 Swiss comedy film directed by Reto Salimbeni and starring David Naughton.
