= One Way (2006 film) =

2006 film by Reto Salimbeni

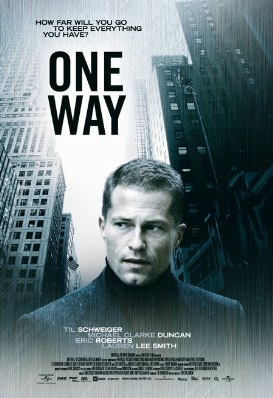
- Directed by: Reto Salimbeni
- Written by: Reto Salimbeni
- Produced by: Til Schweiger
- Starring: Til Schweiger; Michael Clarke Duncan; Lauren Lee Smith; Eric Roberts
- Cinematography: Paul Sarossy; Mark Willis
- Distributed by: Universal Pictures Germany
- Release dates: 21 October 2006 (Hollywood Film Festival); 25 January 2007 (Germany)
- Running time: 116 minutes
- Country: Germany

One Way is a 2006 German crime drama/psychological thriller film written and directed by Reto Salimbeni and produced by Til Schweiger. The film stars Schweiger, Michael Clarke Duncan, Lauren Lee Smith and Eric Roberts. The international production was shot in Toronto, New York City, Vancouver and Cologne and was co-produced and distributed by Universal Pictures.

== Plot ==
Eddie Schneider is a charismatic and successful creative director at a top advertising agency in New York. A master of communication, his pitching skills are legendary, and he never loses an account. Eddie is engaged to Judy Birk, the boss's daughter. Eddie's life looks perfect, but internally he battles an addiction to sex with no success. His addiction has led him into a life of lies and deceit. Although struggling with his dark side, Eddie thinks his infidelities are victimless crimes and justifies them with his business success.

After winning a huge pitch for the agency, Eddie discovers his co-worker and friend Angelina has been raped by Judy's brother Anthony. The Birk family bring in their top lawyer to make sure Anthony is found innocent, but to ensure his freedom Anthony blackmails Eddie with evidence of Eddie's countless affairs, demanding Eddie testifies in court on his behalf. To maintain his perfect life and upcoming marriage, Eddie helps Anthony get off the hook.

When Anthony is found not guilty, his victim Angelina is devastated and tries to commit suicide. At the last moment an army general saves her life. Only Angelina sees the general, who is a powerful, revenging, guiding angel of heaven and hell.

Judy finds out about Eddie's affairs and breaks off the engagement, and her father fires him. Eddie is cut out of the world he created for himself.

Helped by her new guardian angel, the general, Angelina takes brutal revenge on both Anthony and Eddie. First, she physically punishes him with a beating; then she uses handcuffs to restrain him while she rapes him with a strap-on dildo. She then shoots and kills him. She orchestrates the assault so that Eddie is the main suspect, thus getting her revenge on him for his failure to testify against Anthony. With no support from former family and friends, Eddie finds himself in prison, facing trial with no way out.

Even after he is exposed as an obsessive adulterer in court, Eddie refuses to testify against Angelina. He looks doomed to suffer a lifelong jail sentence. In the film's climax, Judy comes to Eddie's rescue by providing evidence to prove his innocence.

== Locations ==
One Way was shot in Toronto, New York, Vancouver and Cologne (interiors).

== Accolades ==
Til Schweiger (Best Actor) and Reto Salimbeni (Best Screenplay) were nominated in the pre-selection for the German Film Award.
