= Reto Salimbeni =

Swiss film director (born 1958)

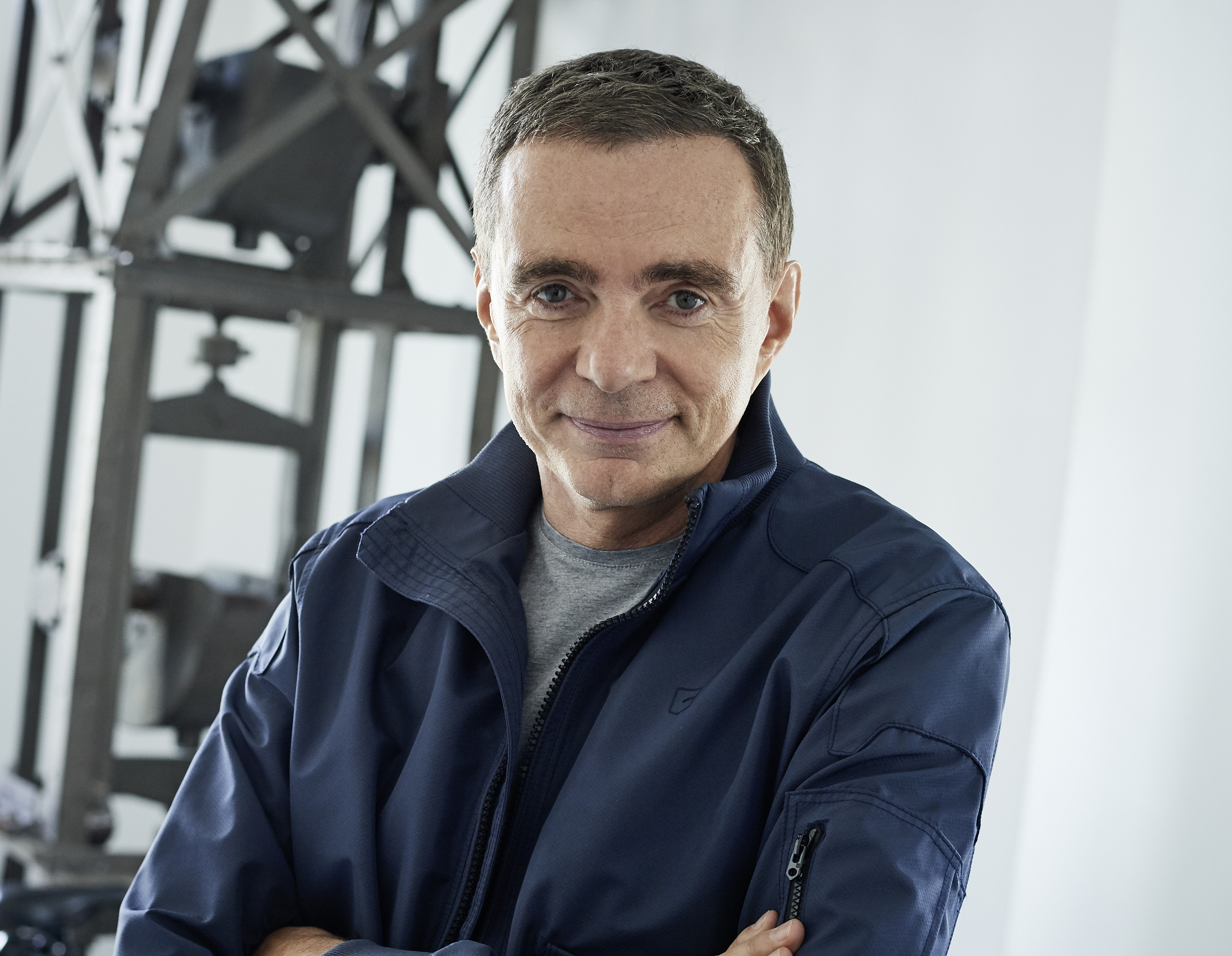
Reto Salimbeni - Director (international)

Reto Salimbeni (born July 28, 1958) is a filmmaker and director known for his features and commercials. His films include Urban Safari, The Day I Was My Father and One Way.

== Life ==
Salimbeni grew up in Zurich, Switzerland and Bologna, Italy. He enjoyed watching films from early on. He graduated from the Business School of Zurich in 1979 and immediately pursued a career in film. In 2001, Salimbeni created Manifesto Films with its main office in Vancouver and Zurich.

== Commercials ==
Salimbeni started in the industry production managing on several commercial and television productions. By the age of 24 he produced the feature film Ready to Murder by Lesly Darbon for Swiss Television. The same year Salimbeni directed a no-budget music video for local top-act Trampolin. The video gained top airplay status during that year and the exposure opened doors for Salimbeni into the commercial arena. Directing over 700 commercials, he built his reputation for "visual storytelling with a human twist" (SHOOT magazine). His work has included spots for brands such as Nike, IKEA, VW, MTV, Chevron, McDonald's, Panasonic, UEFA and Pepsi. He has won over 80 international awards for his commercials – among them the New York Festival, the IAFF Cannes, the Art Directors Club N.Y. and the Art Directors Club Europe. His campaign for MTV "Headbanger" was nominated for the Grand Prix at the New York TV & Film Awards. In 2007 Salimbeni directed the music video "Try again" for the British rockband Keane, starring Til Schweiger and Nora Tschirner.

During the 1990s, already an established director in Europe, he expanded into the US market, directing nationwide campaigns for prominent agencies including J. Walter Thompson and Foote, Cone & Belding in San Francisco.

In October 2010, Salimbeni signed to New York-based production company COLLECTIVE for commercial representation.

Between 2010 and 2015 Reto Salimbeni won the prestigious "Spot of the year" Award four times and the "Audience Award" three times for his work for UPC, Swiss Fruits, Shell and Lidl.

== Features ==
=== Urban Safari ===
As writer and director, Salimbeni shot this independent comedy in 1995 starring Barry Pepper, Linda Kash and David Naughton. The film was picked up for distribution by Universal International Pictures and sold to over 80 territories, opening theatrically in the US in 1997, after a successful European run.

=== The Day I Was My Father / Was ist bloß mit meinen Männern los? ===
In 2001, Salimbeni wrote and directed this family comedy for German Studio Bavaria Films and Pro7, starring Christian Tramitz, Thomas Heinze and Sidonie von Krosigk. The film was nominated for "best German children movie".

=== One Way ===
In 2007, Salimbeni wrote and directed this thriller/drama starring Til Schweiger, Michael Clarke Duncan, Lauren Lee Smith and Eric Roberts that sparked a controversy by tackling the sensitive subject of rape and delving into the dark side of humanity. Co-produced and distributed by Universal International Pictures.

== TV Series ==
In 2015, Reto Salimbeni joined as Director and Associate Producer with Brahm Wenger (Executive Producer) and many of America's leading non-profits to create Mack & Moxy — a children's show that introduces kids to causes such as education, saving wild animals, emergency preparedness, and autism. Mack & Moxy premiered February 20, 2016 on American Public Television and Netflix.
