= Bridge Tender's House (artwork) =

Public artwork

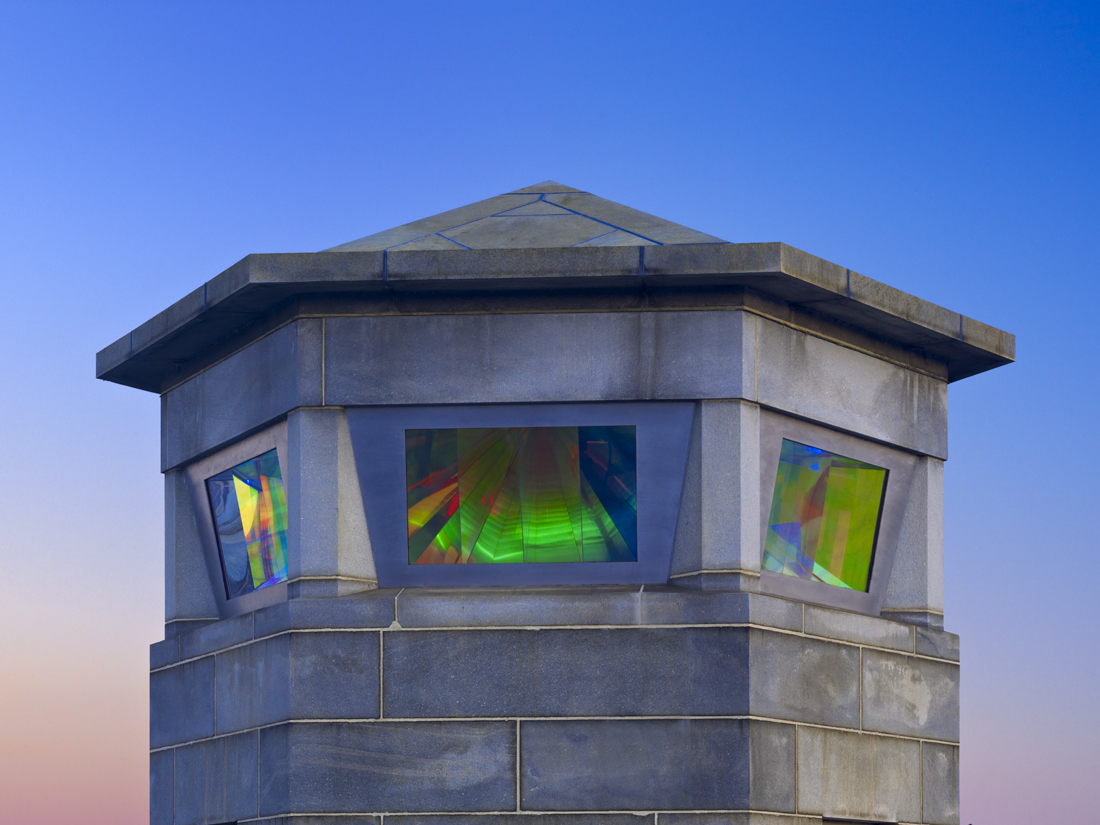
- Artist: Mikyoung Kim
- Year: 2009
- Type: Dichroic acrylic
- Location: Washington, D.C., United States; 38°52′34.37″N 77°2′28.71″W
- Owner: D.C. Commission on the Arts and Humanities

Bridge Tender's House is a public artwork by American artist Mikyoung Kim, located on the 14th Street Bridge in Washington, D.C., United States. "Bridge Tender's House" was commissioned through the D.C. Commission on the Arts and Humanities.

== Description ==
Housed inside the bridge's original watchtower (or bridge tender's house), each of the six windows has a group of reflective, dichroic acrylic kaleidoscope cones that feature abstract reflective floating surfaces of color and light. The bottom of each cone has a mirror and a light that assists in producing a reflection. Each angle produces a different hue which emanates from the windows, visible from the bridge, the Washington Metro and the Potomac River, but in compliance with U.S. Coast Guard regulations, not allowing it to distract drivers on land or water. Overall, the piece sends out "thousands of glimmering colors in six directions where a drawbridge once sat."

The kaleidoscopes consist of panels of clear and reflective acrylic material. The reflective and dichroic panels are clipped and bolted to the masonry window sill of the structure. The acrylic was chosen due to its sturdiness as a shatterproof, heat resistant, fire retardant product that also resists sunlight fading. Three fiber optic illumination boxes with a central halide fixture are installed with multiple fiber optic cables that serve as lighting sources for the kaleidoscopes. They are secured with steel beams and platforms, which also serve as a rotating table for the lights.

== Acquisition ==
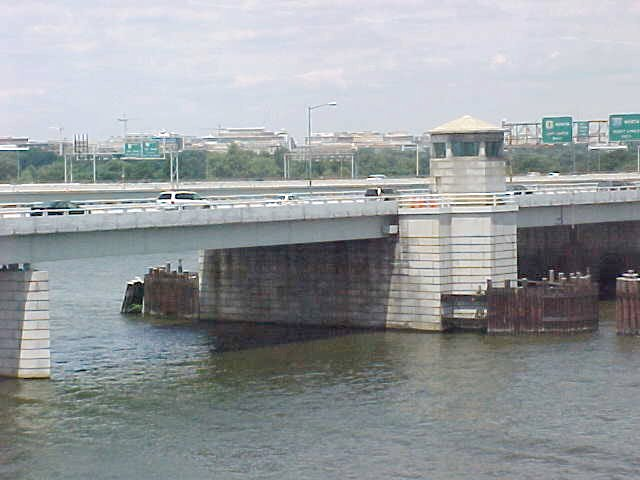
Position of the project on the 14th Street Bridge

The Washington D.C. Department of Transportation believed that the watchtower, which served as a lookout point for the bridge's former role as a drawbridge (which ended in the 1960s), was an eyesore and requested the assistance of the D.C. Commission on the Arts and Humanities to find an artist to create something that would enhance the space.

In all, 122 artists applied for the project, a selected group of artists were brought to the watchtower to experience the space, and five finalists were selected. The submission requirements set by the District Department of Transportation reflected concerns for driver safety: no additional extensions to the height of the tower or flashing lights were allowed, the artwork could not slow down traffic, and of course safety, low maintenance, and durability to the work of art were required. The finalists' projects were also reviewed by the U.S. Coast Guard, the Federal Aviation Administration and the Federal Highway Administration. Eventually, Mikyoung Kim was selected as the artist for the work.

== Artist ==
Mikyoung Kim is a landscape architect from Boston, Massachusetts and currently serves as a professor of design at the Rhode Island School of Design

== Concept ==
Kim's creation of the Bridge Tenders House was inspired by the "shimmering Potomac river" and the "fast paced movement of the train and cars". Before the installation of the artwork the watchtower underwent a major rehabilitation project. It was re-roofed, repairs to masonry and tiles took place, asbestos removed, and glass was replaced.

The view of kaleidoscope while driving by at night.

== Installation ==
Once the renovations to the tower were completed the artwork was installed. Once the northbound bridge deck construction was completed the piece was activated. The lights turn on starting at 4pm until midnight each night.

== Conservation ==
The 400-watt metal halide fixture and fiber optic illuminating boxes require a bulb change every 1 to 2 years. The acrylic surfaces which face the window are cleaned with a non-abrasive cloth and a standard window cleaner. Clear fishing line is placed across the openings in the surfaces to deter birds from entering the space and clear non-glare acrylic panels can be placed in front of each kaleidoscope to protect the internal space even further.

== See also ==
- List of public art in Washington, D.C., Ward 2
