= Air Florida Flight 90 =

1982 aircraft accident in Washington, D.C.

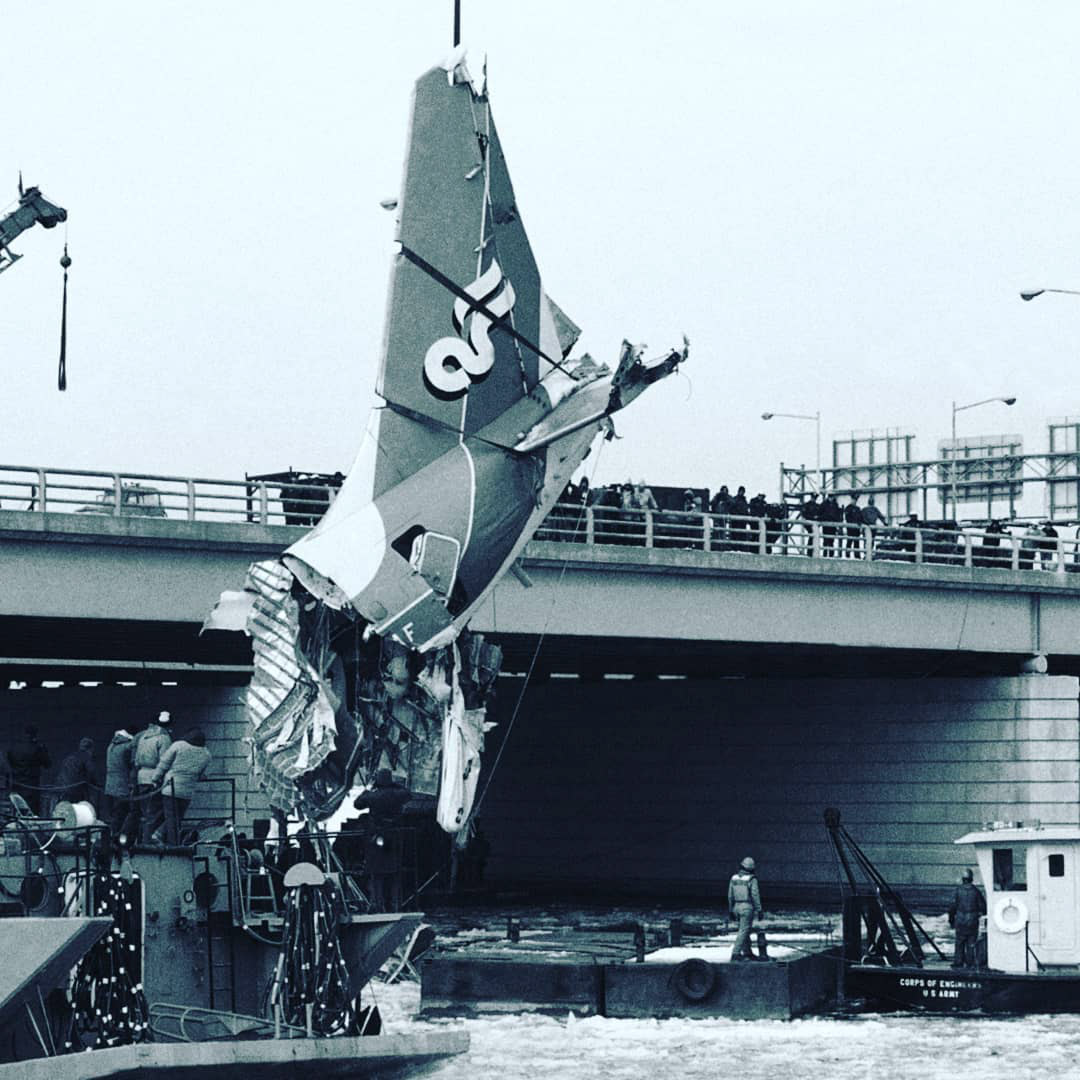
- The tail section of the aircraft being hoisted from the Potomac River

Accident
- Date: January 13, 1982
- Summary: Stalled and crashed shortly after take off due to lack of de-icing and pilot error
- Site: Potomac River, Washington, D.C.; 38°52′34″N 77°02′29″W
- Total fatalities: 78
- Total injuries: 9

Aircraft
- N62AF, the aircraft involved in the accident, pictured in May 1981
- Aircraft type: Boeing 737-222 (Note: The aircraft was a Boeing 737-200 model; Boeing assigns a unique code for each company that buys one of its aircraft, which is applied as an infix to the model number at the time the aircraft is built, hence "737-222" designates a 737-200 built for United Airlines (customer code 22).)
- Operator: Air Florida
- IATA flight No.: QH90
- ICAO flight No.: FLA90
- Call sign: PALM 90
- Registration: N62AF
- Flight origin: Washington National Airport
- Stopover: Tampa International Airport
- Destination: Fort Lauderdale–Hollywood Int'l Airport
- Occupants: 79
- Passengers: 74
- Crew: 5
- Fatalities: 74
- Injuries: 5
- Survivors: 5

Ground casualties
- Ground fatalities: 4
- Ground injuries: 4

Air Florida Flight 90 was a scheduled domestic passenger flight operated from Washington National Airport (now Ronald Reagan Washington National Airport) to Fort Lauderdale–Hollywood International Airport, with an intermediate stopover at Tampa International Airport, that crashed into the 14th Street Bridge over the Potomac River just after takeoff from Washington National Airport on January 13, 1982. The Boeing 737-200 that executed the flight, registered as N62AF, struck the bridge, which carries Interstate 395 between Washington, D.C., and Arlington County, Virginia, hitting seven occupied vehicles and destroying 97 feet (30 m) of guard rail before plunging through the ice into the Potomac River.

The aircraft was carrying 74 passengers and five crew members. Only four passengers and one crew member (flight attendant Kelly Duncan) were rescued from the crash and survived. Another passenger, Arland D. Williams Jr., assisted in the rescue of the survivors, but drowned before he could be rescued. Four motorists on the bridge were killed. The survivors were rescued from the icy river by civilians and professionals. President Ronald Reagan commended these acts during his State of the Union speech 13 days later.

The National Transportation Safety Board (NTSB) determined that the cause of the accident was pilot error. The pilots failed to switch on the engines' internal ice protection systems, used reverse thrust in a snowstorm prior to takeoff, tried to use the jet exhaust of a plane in front of them to melt their ice, and failed to abandon the takeoff even after detecting a power problem while taxiing and ice and snow buildup on the wings.

== Background ==
=== Aircraft ===
The aircraft involved, a 13-year-old Boeing 737-222, registered as N62AF, was manufactured in 1969 and previously flown by United Airlines under the registration N9050U. It was sold to Air Florida in 1980. The aircraft was powered by two Pratt & Whitney JT8D-9A turbofan engines, and had flown over 27,000 hours before the accident.

=== Cockpit crew ===
The captain, Larry M. Wheaton, aged 34, was hired by Air Florida in October 1978 as a first officer. He was promoted to captain in August 1980. At the time of the accident, he had about 8,300 total flight hours, with 2,322 hours of commercial jet experience, all logged at Air Florida. He had logged 1,752 hours on the Boeing 737, the accident aircraft type, 1,100 of those hours as captain.

Wheaton was described by fellow pilots as a quiet person, with good operational skills and knowledge, who had operated well in high-workload flying situations. His leadership style was described as similar to those of other pilots. On May 8, 1980, though, he was suspended after failing a Boeing 737 company line check and was found to be unsatisfactory in these areas: adherence to regulations, checklist usage, flight procedures such as departures and autopilot usage, and approaches and landings. He resumed his duties after passing a retest on August 27, 1980. On April 24, 1981, he received an unsatisfactory grade on a company recurrent proficiency check when he showed deficiencies in memory items, knowledge of aircraft systems, and aircraft limitations. Three days later, he satisfactorily passed a proficiency recheck.

The first officer, Roger A. Pettit, aged 31, was hired by Air Florida on October 3, 1980, as a first officer on the Boeing 737. At the time of the accident, he had around 3,353 flight hours, 992 with Air Florida, all on the 737. From October 1977 to October 1980, he had been a fighter pilot in the US Air Force, accumulating 669 hours as a flight examiner, instructor pilot, and ground instructor in an F-15 fighter unit.

The first officer was described by personal friends and pilots as a witty, bright, outgoing individual with an excellent command of physical and mental skills in aircraft piloting. Those who had flown with him during stressful flight operations said that during those times, he remained the same witty, sharp individual, "who knew his limitations." Several persons said that he was the type of pilot who would not hesitate to speak up if he knew something specific was wrong with flight operations.

Pilots normally alternate who flies each leg. One pilot is designated the pilot flying (PF) and the other the pilot monitoring (PM); however, the captain retains ultimate authority for all aircraft operations. The first officer was the pilot flying during this accident.

=== Cabin crew ===
The three cabin crew consisted of Senior Flight Attendant Donna Adams (23) with 4 years' service at Air Florida, Marilyn Nichols (25) with 3 years' service, and Kelly Duncan (23) with 3 years' service.

=== Weather conditions ===
On Wednesday, January 13, 1982, Washington National Airport (DCA) was closed following a heavy snowstorm, which produced 6.5 inches (17 cm) of snow. It reopened at noon under marginal conditions as the snowfall decreased.

That afternoon, the plane was to return to Fort Lauderdale–Hollywood International Airport, with an intermediate stop at Tampa International Airport. The scheduled departure time was delayed about 1 hour and 45 minutes because of a backlog of arrivals and departures caused by the temporary closing of Washington National Airport. As the plane was readied for departure, moderate snowfall continued with a temperature of 24 °F (−4 °C).

=== Improper deicing procedures ===
The Boeing 737 was deiced with a mixture of heated water and monopropylene glycol by American Airlines, under a ground-service agreement with Air Florida. That agreement specified that covers for the pitot tubes, static ports, and engine inlets had to be used, but the American Airlines employees failed to comply with those rules. One deicing vehicle was used by two different operators, who chose widely different mixture percentages to deice the left and right sides of the aircraft. Subsequent testing of the deicing truck showed, "the mixture dispensed differed substantially from the mixture selected" (18% actual vs. 30% selected). The inaccurate mixture was the result of the replacement of the standard nozzle, "...which is specially modified and calibrated, with a non-modified, commercially available nozzle." The operator had no means to determine if the proportioning valves were operating properly because no "mix monitor" was installed on the nozzle.

== Events of crash ==
=== Flight ===
The plane had trouble leaving the gate when the ground-services tug could not get traction on the icy ramp. For roughly 30 to 90 seconds, the crew attempted to back away from the gate using the reverse thrust of the engines (a powerback), which proved futile. Boeing operations bulletins had warned against using reverse thrust in those kinds of conditions.

Eventually, a ground tug unit properly equipped with snow chains was used to push the aircraft back from the gate. After leaving the gate, the aircraft waited in a taxi line with many other aircraft for 49 minutes before reaching the takeoff runway. The pilot apparently decided not to return to the gate for reapplication of deicing, fearing that the flight's departure would be even further delayed. More snow and ice accumulated on the wings during that period, and the crew was aware of that fact when they decided to take off. Heavy snow was falling during their takeoff roll at 3:59 pm EST.

Though the outside temperature was well below freezing and snow was falling, the crew did not activate the engine anti-ice systems. This system uses heat from the engines to prevent sensors and the engine intake cowl from accumulating ice or snow, ensuring accurate readings.

While running through the takeoff checklist, the following conversation snippet took place (CAM-1 is the captain, CAM-2 is the first officer):

CAM-2 Pitot heat?

CAM-1 On.

CAM-2 Engine anti-ice?

CAM-1 Off.

— Transcript, Air Florida Flight 90 Cockpit Voice Recorder

As a result, this caused the engine pressure ratio (EPR) thrust indicators to provide false readings. The correct engine power setting for the temperature and airport altitude of Washington National at the time was 2.04 EPR, but analysis of the engine noise recorded on the cockpit voice recorder indicated that the actual power output corresponded with an engine pressure ratio of only 1.70.

Neither pilot had much experience flying in snowy, cold weather. The captain had made only eight takeoffs or landings in snowy conditions on the 737, and the first officer had flown in snow only twice.

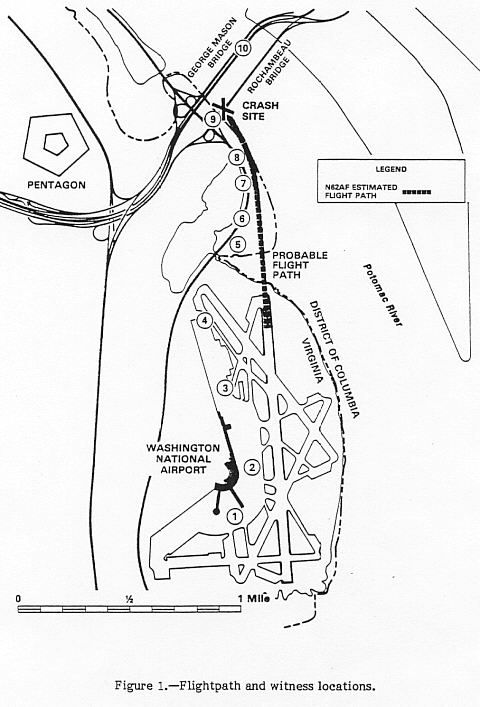
NTSB's diagram of flight path for Air Florida Flight 90.

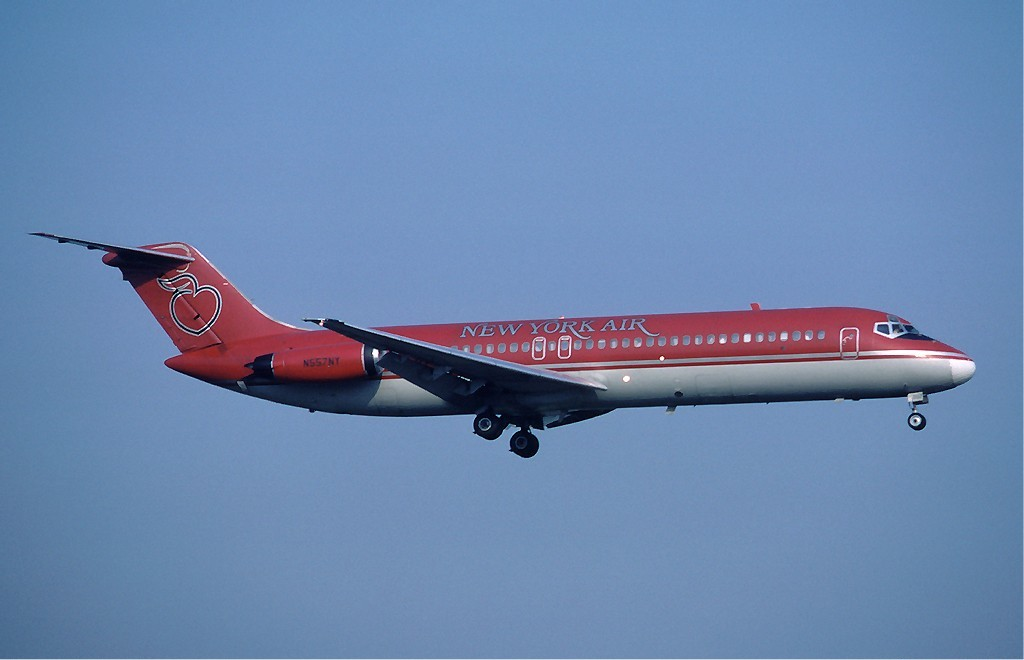
A New York Air DC-9, similar to the one operating as Apple 4 on the day of the accident

Adding to the plane's troubles was the pilots' decision to maneuver closely behind a New York Air DC-9 (Callsign: Apple 4) that was taxiing just ahead of them prior to takeoff, due to their mistaken belief that the warmth from the DC-9's engines would melt the snow and ice that had accumulated on Flight 90's wings. This action, which went specifically against flight-manual recommendations for an icing situation, actually contributed to icing on the 737. The exhaust gases from the other aircraft melted the snow on the wings, but instead of falling off the plane during takeoff, this slush mixture froze on the wings' leading edges and the engine inlet nose cone.

As the takeoff roll began, the first officer noted several times to the captain that the instrument panel readings he was seeing did not seem to reflect reality (he was referring to the fact that the plane did not appear to have developed as much power as it needed for takeoff, despite the instruments indicating otherwise). The captain dismissed these concerns and let the takeoff proceed. Investigators determined that plenty of time and space on the runway remained for the captain to have abandoned the takeoff, and criticized his refusal to listen to his first officer, who was correct that the instrument panel readings were wrong. The pilot was told not to delay because another aircraft was 2.5 nautical miles (2.9 mi; 4.6 km) out on final approach to the same runway. The following is a transcript of Flight 90's cockpit voice recorder during the plane's acceleration down the runway.

15:59:32 CAM-1 Okay, your throttles.

15:59:35 [SOUND OF ENGINE SPOOLUP]

15:59:49 CAM-1 Holler if you need the wipers.

15:59:51 CAM-1 It's spooled. Really cold here, real cold.

15:59:58 CAM-2 God, look at that thing. That don't seem right, does it? Ah, that's not right.

16:00:09 CAM-1 Yes it is, there's eighty.

16:00:10 CAM-2 Naw, I don't think that's right. Ah, maybe it is.

16:00:21 CAM-1 Hundred and twenty.

16:00:23 CAM-2 I don't know.

16:00:31 CAM-1 V_{1}. Easy, V_{2}.

— Transcript, Air Florida Flight 90 Cockpit Voice Recorder

As the plane became briefly airborne, the voice recorder picked up the following from the cockpit, with the sound of the stick-shaker (a device that warns that the plane is in danger of stalling) in the background:

16:00:39 [SOUND OF STICKSHAKER STARTS AND CONTINUES UNTIL IMPACT]

16:00:41 TWR Palm ninety contact departure control.

16:00:45 CAM-1 Forward, forward, easy. We only want five hundred.

16:00:48 CAM-1 Come on forward....forward, just barely climb.

16:00:59 CAM-1 Stalling, we're falling!

16:01:00 CAM-2 Larry, we're going down, Larry....

16:01:01 CAM-1 I know!

16:01:01 [SOUND OF IMPACT]

— Transcript, Air Florida Flight 90 Cockpit Voice Recorder

The aircraft traveled almost half a mile (800 m) farther down the runway than is customary before liftoff was accomplished. Survivors of the crash indicated the trip over the runway was extremely rough, with survivor Joe Stiley—a businessman and private pilot—saying that he believed that they would not get airborne and would "fall off the end of the runway". When the plane became airborne, Stiley told his co-worker (and survivor) Nikki Felch to assume the crash position, with some nearby passengers following their example.

Although the 737 did manage to become airborne, it attained a maximum altitude of just 352 feet (107 m) before it began losing altitude. Recorders later indicated that the aircraft was airborne for just 30 seconds. At 4:01 pm EST, it crashed into the 14th Street Bridge across the Potomac River, 0.75 nmi (0.9 mi; 1.4 km) from the end of the runway. The plane hit six cars and a truck on the bridge, and tore away 97 feet (30 m) of the bridge's rail and 41 feet (12 m) of the bridge's wall. The aircraft then plunged into the freezing Potomac River. It fell between two of the three spans of the bridge, between the I-395 northbound span (the Rochambeau Bridge) and the high-occupancy vehicle lane north- and southbound spans, about 200 ft (70 yd; 60 m) offshore. All but the tail section quickly became submerged.

Of the people on board the aircraft:

- Four of the crew members (including both pilots) died.
- One crew member was seriously injured.
- Seventy of the 74 passengers died.
- Nineteen occupants were believed to have survived the impact, but their injuries prevented them from escaping.

Of the motorists on the bridge involved:

- Four sustained fatal injuries
- One sustained serious injuries
- Three sustained minor injuries

Clinging to the tail section of the broken airliner in the ice-choked Potomac River were flight attendant Kelly Duncan and four passengers: Patricia "Nikki" Felch, Joe Stiley, Arland D. Williams Jr. (strapped and tangled in his seat), and Priscilla Tirado. Duncan inflated the only flotation device they could find, and passed it to the severely injured Felch. Passenger Bert Hamilton, who was floating in the water nearby, was the first to be pulled from the water.

=== Crash response ===
Many federal offices in downtown Washington had closed early that day in response to quickly developing blizzard conditions. Thus, significant backups of traffic existed on almost all of the city's roads, which made it unusually difficult for ambulances to reach the crash site. The Coast Guard's 65-foot (20 m) harbor tugboat Capstan (WYTL 65601) and its crew were based nearby; their duties include icebreaking and responding to water rescues. The Capstan was considerably farther downriver on another search-and-rescue mission. Emergency ground response was hampered by ice-covered roads and gridlocked traffic; ambulances dispatched at 4:07 pm took 20 minutes to reach the crash scene. Ambulances attempting to reach the crash site were even driven down the sidewalk in front of the White House. Rescuers who reached the site were unable to assist survivors in the water because they did not have adequate equipment to reach them. Water temperature, about 34 °F (1 °C), and heavy ice made swimming out to the victims impossible. Multiple attempts to throw a makeshift lifeline (made of belts and other items which could be tied together) out to the survivors proved ineffective. The rescue attempts by emergency officials and witnesses were recorded and broadcast live by area news reporters, and because the accident occurred in the nation's capital, large numbers of media personnel were on hand to provide quick and extensive coverage.

Roger Olian, a sheet-metal foreman at St. Elizabeths Hospital, a Washington psychiatric hospital, was on his way home across the 14th Street Bridge when he heard a man yelling that an aircraft was in the water. He was the first to jump into the water to attempt to reach the survivors. At the same time, several military personnel from the Pentagon—Steve Raynes, Aldo De La Cruz, and Steve Bell—ran to the water's edge to help Olian.

He only traveled a few yards and came back, ice sticking to his body. We asked him to not try again, but he insisted. Someone grabbed some short rope and battery cables and he went out again, maybe only going 30 feet (10 m). We pulled him back. Someone had backed up their jeep and we picked him up and put him in there. All anyone could do was tell the survivors to hold on, not to give up hope. There were a few pieces of the plane on shore that were smoldering and you could hear the screams of the survivors. More people arrived near the shore from the bridge, but nobody could do anything. The ice was broken up and there was no way to walk out there. It was so eerie, an entire plane vanished except for a tail section, the survivors, and a few pieces of plane debris. The smell of jet fuel was everywhere, and you could smell it on your clothes. The snow on the banks was easily two feet high and your legs and feet would fall deep into it every time you moved from the water.

At this point, air traffic controllers and flight controllers were aware only that the plane had disappeared from radar and was not responding to radio calls, and had no idea what had happened or where the plane was located.

Around 4:20 pm EST, Eagle 1, a United States Park Police Bell 206L-1 Long Ranger helicopter, based at the "Eagles Nest" at Anacostia Park in Washington, arrived and began attempting to airlift the survivors to shore. At great risk to themselves, the crew worked close to the water's surface, at one time coming so close to the ice-clogged river that the helicopter's skids dipped beneath the surface. At this point, survivors had been in the 34-degree water for over 20 minutes.

The helicopter crew lowered a line to survivors to tow them to shore. First to receive the line was Bert Hamilton, who was treading water about 10 feet (3 m) from the plane's floating tail and closest to the helicopter. The pilot pulled him across the ice to shore, while avoiding the sides of the bridge. By then, some fire and rescue personnel had arrived to join the military personnel and civilians who pulled Hamilton (and the next, last three survivors) from the water's edge up to waiting ambulances; rescuers and civilians on the banks had to duck to avoid the helicopter's rotors. The helicopter returned to the aircraft's tail, and this time Arland D. Williams Jr. (sometimes referred to as "the sixth passenger") caught the line. Williams, not able to unstrap himself from the wreckage, passed the line to flight attendant Kelly Duncan, who was airlifted to shore. On its third trip back to the wreckage, the helicopter lowered two lifelines, fearing that the remaining survivors had only a few minutes before succumbing to hypothermia. Williams, still strapped into the wreckage, passed one line to Joe Stiley, who was holding on to panic-stricken Priscilla Tirado, who had lost her husband and baby. Stiley's co-worker, Nikki Felch, took the second line. As the helicopter pulled the three through the water and blocks of ice toward shore, both Tirado and Felch lost their grip and fell back into the water. While being dragged through the ice to the riverbank by the helicopter, Stiley broke multiple ribs.

Tirado, seriously injured and blinded by jet fuel, was too weak to grab the line when the helicopter returned to her. A watching bystander, Congressional Budget Office assistant Lenny Skutnik, stripped off his coat and boots, and in short sleeves, dove into the icy water and swam out to successfully pull her to shore. The helicopter then proceeded to where Felch had fallen, and paramedic Gene Windsor stepped onto the helicopter skid and grabbed Felch's clothing to lift her onto the skid and bring her to shore. Ten minutes passed from the time the helicopter arrived on scene until Felch's rescue.

When the helicopter crew returned for Williams, the wreckage he was strapped into had rolled slightly, submerging him; according to the coroner, Williams was the only passenger to die by drowning. His body and those of the other occupants were recovered later.

The inclement weather had caused an early start to Washington's rush-hour traffic, frustrating the response time of emergency crews. The early rush hour also meant that trains on the Washington Metro were full when, just 30 minutes after Flight 90 crashed, the Metro suffered its first fatal crash at Federal Triangle station. This meant that Washington's nearest airport, one of its main bridges in or out of the city, and one of its busiest subway lines were all closed simultaneously, paralyzing much of the metropolitan area.

== Media responses ==
The first member of the news media to arrive was Chester Panzer of WRC-TV. Panzer and a crew member were stuck in traffic in their news vehicle on the George Washington Parkway when the plane crashed a few hundred yards from them. Minutes later, they were shooting video footage of the crash scene, depicting wreckage and survivors in the water, along with the arrival of first responders. Panzer captured Skutnik's dive to pull Tirado from the water. Panzer was a 1983 Pulitzer Prize finalist for this spot news photography.

Charles "Charlie" Pereira, a photographer with the United States Park Police, immediately ran to the 14th Street Bridge upon learning of the crash and captured the only still images from the rescue. He was nominated for a Pulitzer Prize for his photography.

John Goldsmith, an off-beat reporter for WDVM-TV (now WUSA), was coincidentally at National Airport prior to the incident reporting on the snowstorm, and even caught footage of Flight 90 prior to takeoff. He was first on the air with the story.

Among the plethora of news coverage of the incident, The Washington Post published a story about the then-unidentified survivor of the crash, Arland D. Williams Jr., who had handed the lifeline to others and drowned before he could be rescued:

He was about 50 years old, one of half a dozen survivors clinging to twisted wreckage bobbing in the icy Potomac when the first helicopter arrived. To the copter's two-man Park Police crew, he seemed the most alert. Life vests were dropped, then a flotation ball. The man passed them to the others. On two occasions, the crew recalled last night, he handed away a lifeline from the hovering machine that could have dragged him to safety. The helicopter crew who rescued five people, the only persons who survived from the jetliner, lifted a woman to the riverbank, then dragged three more persons across the ice to safety. Then, the lifeline saved a woman who was trying to swim away from the sinking wreckage, and the helicopter pilot, Donald W. Usher, returned to the scene, but the man was gone.

The day after the crash, WWDC "shock jock" Howard Stern pretended to call the Air Florida ticket counter to ask about buying tickets to the 14th Street Bridge.

== NTSB investigation and conclusion ==
The 737 had broken into several large pieces upon impact—the nose and cockpit section, the cabin up to the wing attachment point, the cabin from behind the wings to the rear airstairs, and the empennage. Although actual impact speeds were low and well within survivability limits, the structural breakup of the fuselage and exposure to freezing water nonetheless proved fatal for all persons aboard the plane except those seated in the tail section. The NTSB concluded that the accident was not survivable. Determining the position of the rudder, slats, elevators, and ailerons was not possible due to impact damage and destruction of the majority of flight control systems.

The NTSB determined that the probable cause of the crash included the flight crew's failure to enforce a sterile cockpit during the final preflight checklist procedure. The engines' anti-ice heaters were not engaged during ground operation and takeoff. The decision to take off with snow/ice on the airfoil surfaces of the aircraft, and the captain's failure to reject the takeoff during the early stage, when his attention was called to anomalous engine instrument readings, were also erroneous.

The NTSB further stated:

Contributing to the accident were the prolonged ground delay between deicing and the receipt of ATC takeoff clearance during which the aircraft was exposed to continual precipitation, the known inherent pitch up characteristics of the B-737 aircraft when the leading edge is contaminated with even small amounts of snow or ice, and the limited experience of the flight crew in jet transport winter operations.

== Long-term aftermath ==
=== Honors ===
The "sixth passenger", who had survived the crash and had repeatedly given up the rescue lines to other survivors before drowning, was later identified as 46-year-old bank examiner Arland D. Williams Jr. The repaired span of the 14th Street Bridge complex over the Potomac River at the crash site, then named the Rochambeau Bridge, was renamed the Arland D. Williams Jr. Memorial Bridge in his honor. The Citadel in South Carolina, from which he graduated in 1957, has several memorials to him. In 2003, the new Arland D. Williams Jr. Elementary School was dedicated in his hometown of Mattoon in Coles County, Illinois.

Civilians Roger Olian and Lenny Skutnik received the Coast Guard's Gold Lifesaving Medal. Arland D. Williams, Jr. also received the award posthumously. Skutnik was introduced to the joint session of the U.S. Congress during President Ronald Reagan's State of the Union speech later that month.

The Coast Guard awarded a Silver Lifesaving Medal to two crewmen of the U.S. Park Police helicopter Eagle 1. As the U.S. Park Police are part of the United States Department of the Interior, pilot Donald W. Usher and paramedic Melvin E. Windsor also received the Interior Department's Valor Award, presented in a special ceremony soon after the accident by Secretary of the Interior James G. Watt. Usher later became superintendent of the National Park Service Law Enforcement Training Center located at FLETC in Brunswick, Georgia, before retiring in December 2012.

Roger Olian, Lenny Skutnik, Donald Usher, and Melvin Windsor each received the Carnegie Hero Fund Medal. Kelly Duncan, the only surviving flight attendant, was recognized in the NTSB accident report for her "unselfish act" of giving the only life vest she could find to a passenger.

=== Regulatory and procedure changes ===
The investigation following the crash, especially regarding the failure of the captain to respond to crew concerns about the deicing procedure, led to a number of reforms in pilot-training regulations. Partial blame was placed on the young, inexperienced flight crew, who had a combined age of only 65 and had begun their careers as commercial pilots less than five years earlier. Typical of upstart, low-cost carriers, Air Florida frequently hired youthful pilots who worked for less money than veterans, and were for the most part seeking to gain flight experience prior to joining a major airline. It became a widely used case study for both air crews and rescue workers.

=== Air Florida ===
Air Florida, already struggling financially, saw its fortunes turn for the worse. Video of rescue efforts were widely broadcast, as was an iconic image of the broken tail of the aircraft, Air Florida logo prominently displayed, being pulled from the river; reservations plummeted. The airline filed for bankruptcy and ceased operations in 1984.

== In popular culture ==
The Discovery Channel Canada/National Geographic TV series Mayday (also called Air Crash Investigation or Air Emergency) dramatized the accident in an episode titled "Disaster on the Potomac" (aired in some countries as "Tragedy on the Potomac").

The PBS series Nova featured the crash in season 14, episode 13, titled "Why Planes Crash."

The crash was featured in season 2, episode 2, of the TV show Why Planes Crash, in an episode called "Brush with Death".

The National Geographic Channel series Seconds from Disaster also dramatized the accident entitled "Plane Crash in the Potomac".

Aircrash Confidential also covered the accident in one of their episodes.

The crash was also dramatized in the 1984 made-for-TV movie Flight 90: Disaster on the Potomac.

Critical Rescue has also dedicated an entire episode to the heroes of the disaster.

The flight has also been shown on the show When Weather Changed History on American-based The Weather Channel.

The National Law Enforcement Museum, which opened in Washington, D.C. in 2018, has footage of the crash on display along with interviews of survivors and other first-hand accounts. The display includes the U.S. Park Police helicopter involved in the rescue of Flight 90's survivors.

Arland D Williams, Jr., is commemorated in Sara Hickman's song "Last Man in the Water".

Air Florida Flight 90 is described in Season 2, Episode 1 of the HBO series, The Rehearsal.

== See also ==
- Random Hearts – a novel inspired by the disaster
- 1982 Washington Metro train derailment – a Metro crash that occurred 30 minutes later one mile away.

Similar accidents:

- Arrow Air Flight 1285R – crash of a McDonnell Douglas DC-8 at Gander Airport in 1985 due to wing icing
- Continental Airlines Flight 1713 – crash of a McDonnell Douglas DC-9 on takeoff when having taxied to the runway without clearance, causing confusion for air traffic controllers, leading the flight to sit on the ground for too long after deicing at Stapleton International Airport in Denver in 1987
- Air Ontario Flight 1363 – crashed in Dryden, Ontario, in March 1989 after the flight crew did not deice their jet
- Scandinavian Airlines System Flight 751 – a 1991 crash landing of a McDonnell Douglas MD-81 in Sweden by Stefan G. Rasmussen after ice accumulated in the engines.
- USAir Flight 405 – crash of a Fokker 28 at LaGuardia Airport in Queens, New York City, in 1992. The crash was caused by icing, improper deicing procedures, pilot error, and unforeseen delays.
- American Eagle Flight 4184 – crashed after flying into unforeseen icing conditions in 1994
- Comair Flight 3272 – lost control due to icing on the wing near Detroit Metropolitan Airport in 1997
- China Eastern Airlines Flight 5210 – crashed shortly after takeoff in 2004 after the jet collected a layer of frost overnight and was not deiced
- Emirates Flight 407 – a near-miss in 2009 after the crew incorrectly calculated the takeoff weight and did not apply enough thrust to take off properly
- Sol Líneas Aéreas Flight 5428 – crashed due to icing in Argentina in 2011
- 2025 Potomac River mid-air collision – collided with a helicopter and subsequently crashed into the Potomac River, approximately 4km south of Flight 90's crash site.
