= 14th Street bridges =

Bridges in Virginia and Washington, D.C.

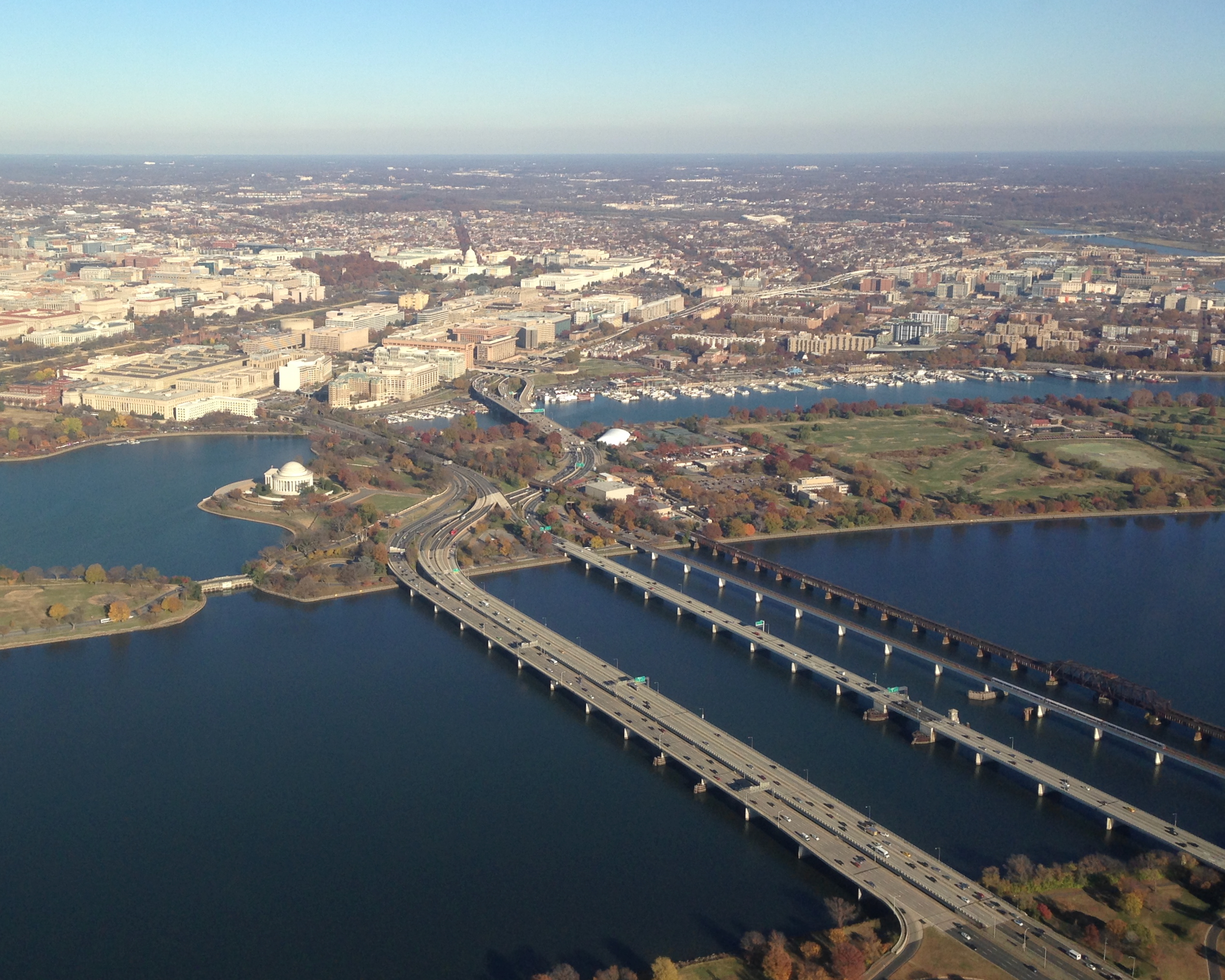
- Aerial view in November 2013, with East Potomac Park, the Washington Channel, and the National Mall in the background
- Coordinates: 38.876°N 77.041°W
- Carries: I-395 / US 1 Amtrak/VRE/CSX
- Crosses: Potomac River
- Locale: Washington, D.C.
- Other name(s): Arland D. Williams Jr. Memorial Bridge; Rochambeau Bridge; George Mason Memorial Bridge

History
- Opened: 1904–1983

Location
- Interactive map of 14th Street bridges

The 14th Street bridges are a set of adjacent five road and rail bridges that cross the Potomac River, connecting Arlington, Virginia and Washington, D.C. A major gateway for automotive, bicycle and rail traffic, the bridge complex is named for 14th Street (U.S. Route 1), which feeds automotive traffic into it on the D.C. end.

The complex contains three four-lane automobile bridges—including, from west to east, one southbound, one bi-directional, and one northbound—that carry Interstate 395 (I-395) and U.S. Route 1 (US 1) traffic, as well as a bicycle and pedestrian lane on the southbound bridge. In addition, the complex contains two rail bridges, one of which carries the Yellow Line of the Washington Metro; the other of which, the only mainline rail crossing of the Potomac River to Virginia, carries a CSX Transportation rail line. The five bridges, from west to east are the George Mason Memorial Bridge, the Rochambeau Bridge, the Arland D. Williams, Jr. Memorial Bridge, the Charles R. Fenwick Bridge and the Long Bridge. In aerial photos, shadows caused by a large, concrete divider on the bi-directional Rochambeau Bridge create the illusion of two, two-lane bridges, but this is in fact, a single, four-lane structure.

On January 13, 1982, Air Florida Flight 90 clipped the 14th Street Bridge, the northbound I-395 span of the complex, during rush hour and crashed into the Potomac River; this killed four people on the bridge, along with 74 passengers and crew on the aircraft. The repaired span was renamed in honor of Arland D. Williams Jr., a passenger on the plane who survived the initial crash, but drowned after repeatedly passing a helicopter rescue line to other survivors.

== Overview ==
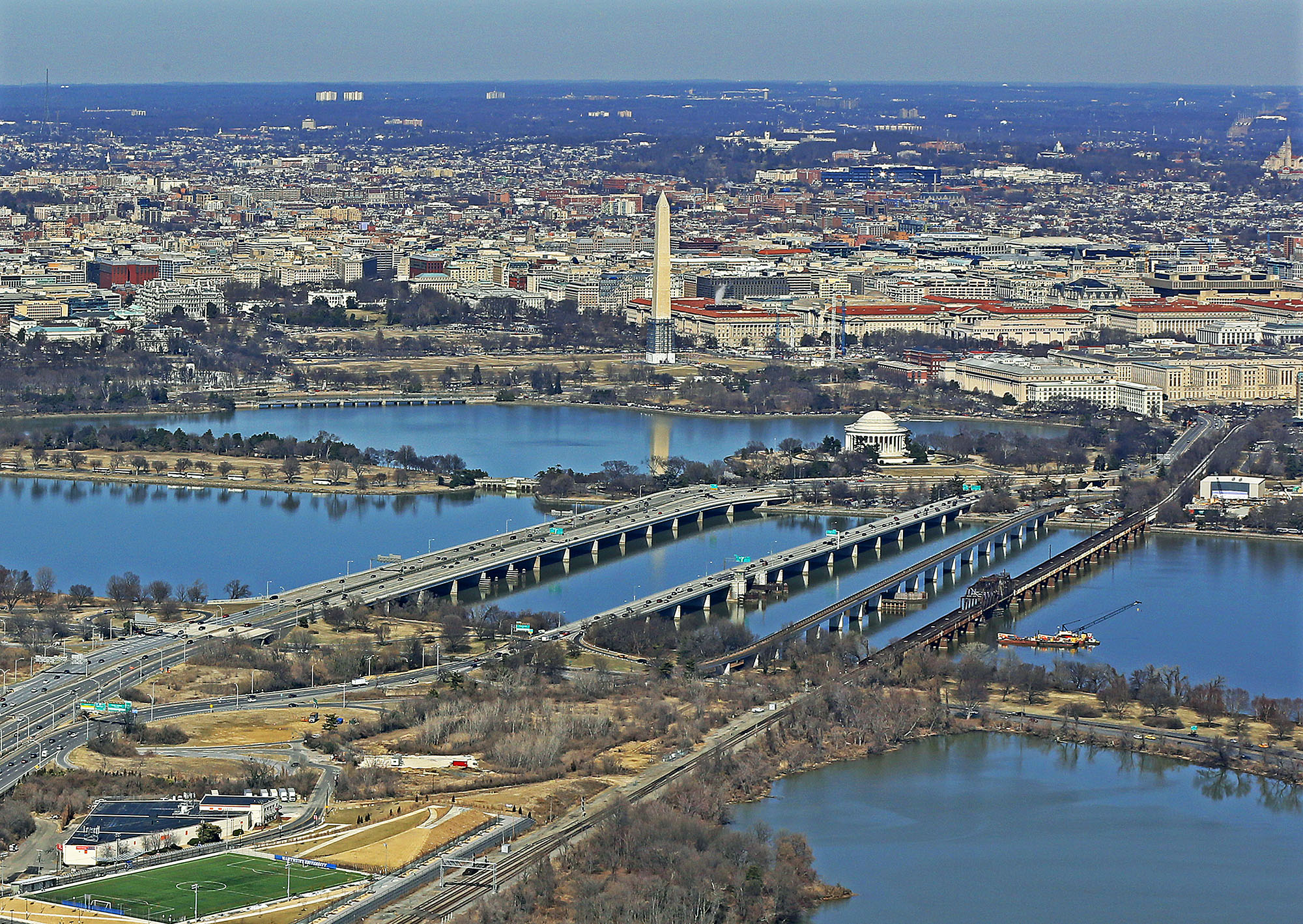
14th Street bridge in February 2014 Looking East at Washington DC

Each of the complex's five bridge spans has its own name. From east to west, the bridges are:

- The 1904 (rebuilt c. 1943) Long Bridge carries the CSX RF&P Subdivision, which is also used by Amtrak and Virginia Railway Express for passenger service. It is the direct successor to a series of bridges by the same name dating back to 1809. The name did not arise from an individual person, but because it was longer than the contemporaneous bridge near Little Falls. The swing span and some of the piers date from 1904, while additional piers and the rest of the deck date from 1943.
- The 1983 Charles R. Fenwick Bridge carries the Yellow Line of the Washington Metro. It is named for the Virginia state senator who helped create the Washington Metropolitan Area Transit Authority.
- The 1950 Arland D. Williams Jr. Memorial Bridge carries northbound road traffic. It gained that name in 1985 for a passenger of the 1982 Air Florida Flight 90 crash who died saving others from the freezing water.
- The 1971 Rochambeau Bridge carries road traffic in both directions. It honors Jean-Baptiste Donatien de Vimeur, comte de Rochambeau; the name was transferred from the Williams Bridge in 1985 .
- The 1962 George Mason Memorial Bridge carries southbound road traffic, with a side path on its upstream side for pedestrians and cyclists. It was a direct replacement for the 1906 Highway Bridge.

At the north end of the bridges, in East Potomac Park, the three roadways connect via an interchange to a pair of two-way bridges over the Washington Channel into downtown Washington: one six-lane bridge connecting to 14th Street (US 1), and the eight-lane Francis Case Memorial Bridge connecting to the Southwest Freeway (I-395). The Metro line connects to a tunnel under Washington Channel that leads into L'Enfant Plaza station. The mainline railroad from the Long Bridge passes over I-395 before crossing the Washington Channel on a bridge, and then turns northeast along the line of Maryland Avenue.

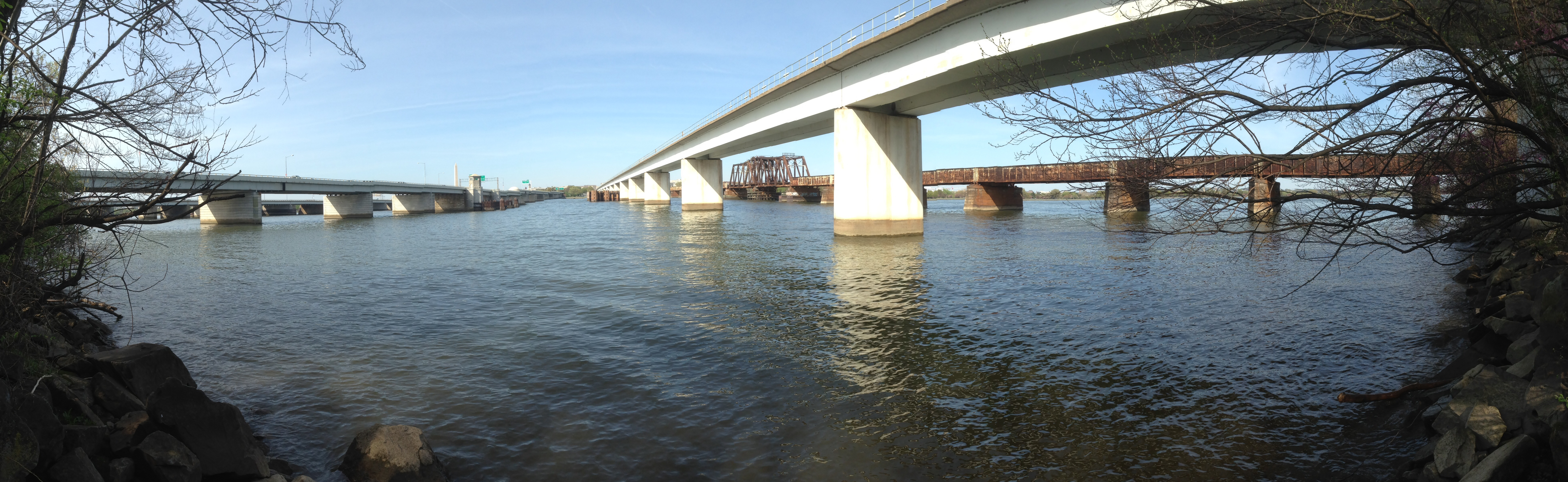
A panoramic view including all five spans: George Mason and Rochambeau Bridges (left background), Williams Bridge (left foreground), Fenwick Bridge (right foreground), and Long Bridge (right background)

== Historical bridges ==
=== Long Bridge ===
1818 map shows the Washington Bridge, here labeled the "Potomac Bridge," between the words "Potomac" and "River".

The name "Long Bridge" was given to a series of bridges across the Potomac dating back to 1809. At times, some of the bridges were referred to as the Bridge at 14th Street, but more often by other names.

The first bridge opened as the Washington Bridge on May 20, 1809 and originally carried vehicle, pedestrian and horse traffic. By the 1830s it began to be called the "long Bridge across the Potomac" to distinguish it from the bridge near Little Falls, but over time, the colloquial name was shortened to just the "Long Bridge". Rails had been built to the bridge from the Washington side in 1855 and from the Virginia side in 1857, but there weren't placed on the bridge until the Civil War.

In 1864, a new bridge was built adjacent to the original bridge. When the U.S. Military railroad Charles Minot fell through one of the spans of the old bridge on February 18, 1865, the rails were moved to the new bridge and the old bridge became used for non-rail traffic only, as had been recommended in the prior year. To some the old bridge became the "turnpike bridge" and the new one the "railroad bridge." For others the two bridges were referred to separately as the Long Bridge and the railroad bridge or as two parts of one "Long Bridge".

An October 1, 1870 flood damaged the bridges beyond repair so a replacement bridge was built over the next two years and the old Washington Bridge was removed.

The new bridge opened on May 15, 1872. The day the new bridge opened, the old railroad bridge, which had been partially repaired, was closed. On July 2, the Alexandria and Fredericksburg Railway opened, providing the first direct all-rail connection between the north and Richmond, Virginia.

Despite the new design, the 1872 bridge continued to be damaged by freshets, it blocked river traffic and was not wide enough for two tracks; so two new bridges were built. A new railroad bridge was constructed in 1904 and a new Highway Bridge opened in December 1906. The 1872 bridge was closed on December 18, 1906 and demolished in 1907.

=== Highway Bridge ===
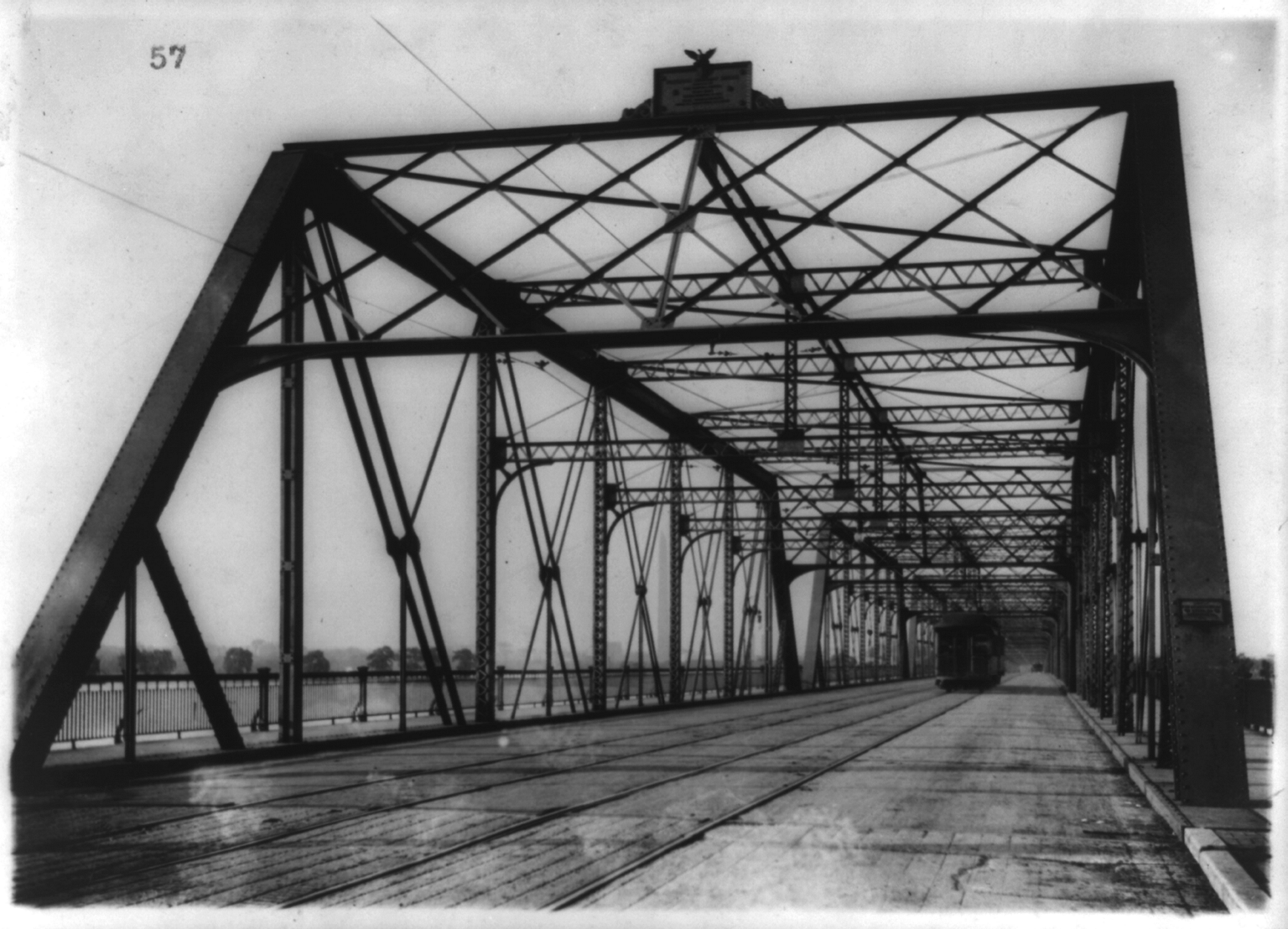
Highway Bridge between 1906 and 1932

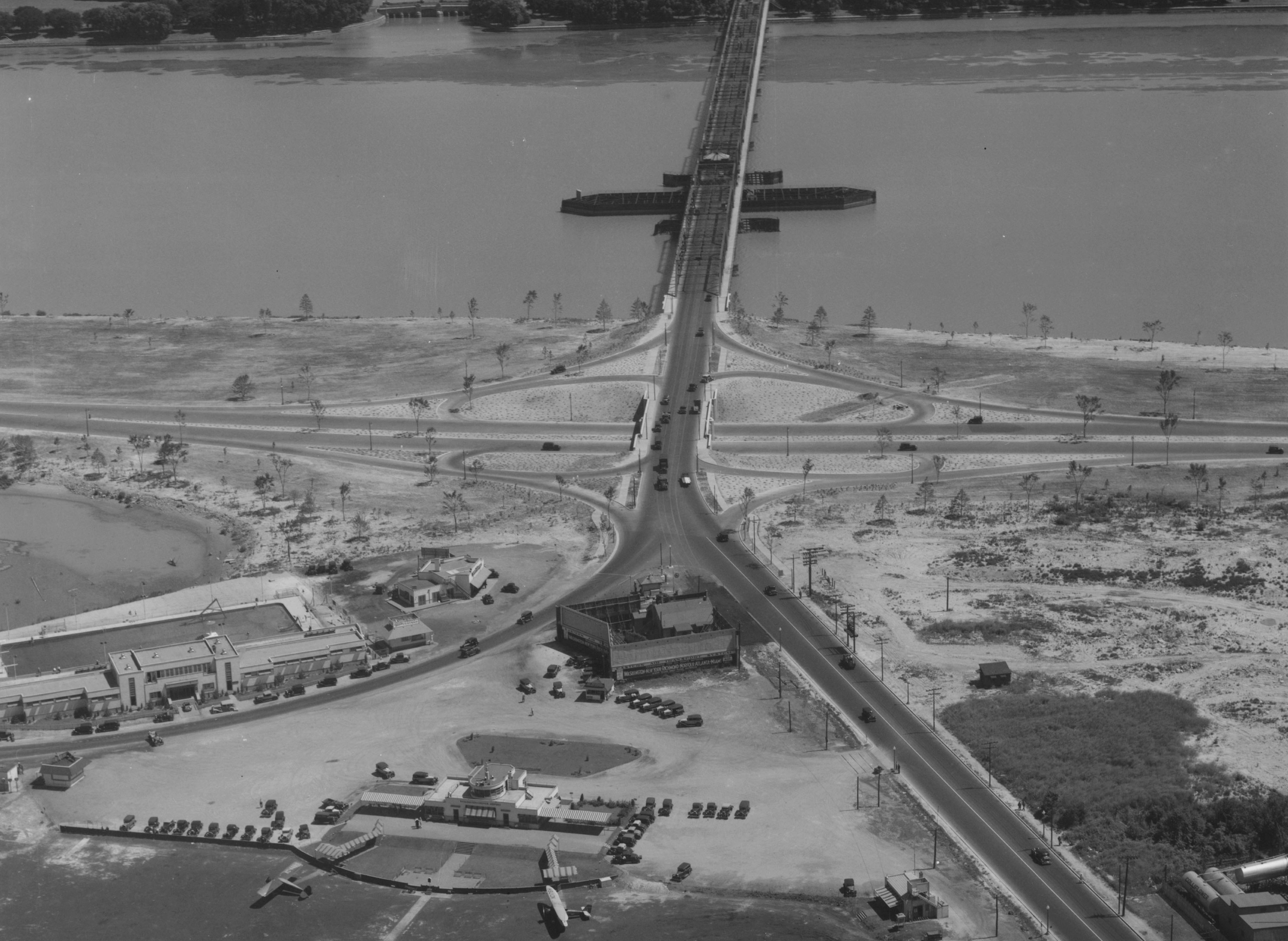
Looking towards Highway Bridge and Washington in 1932

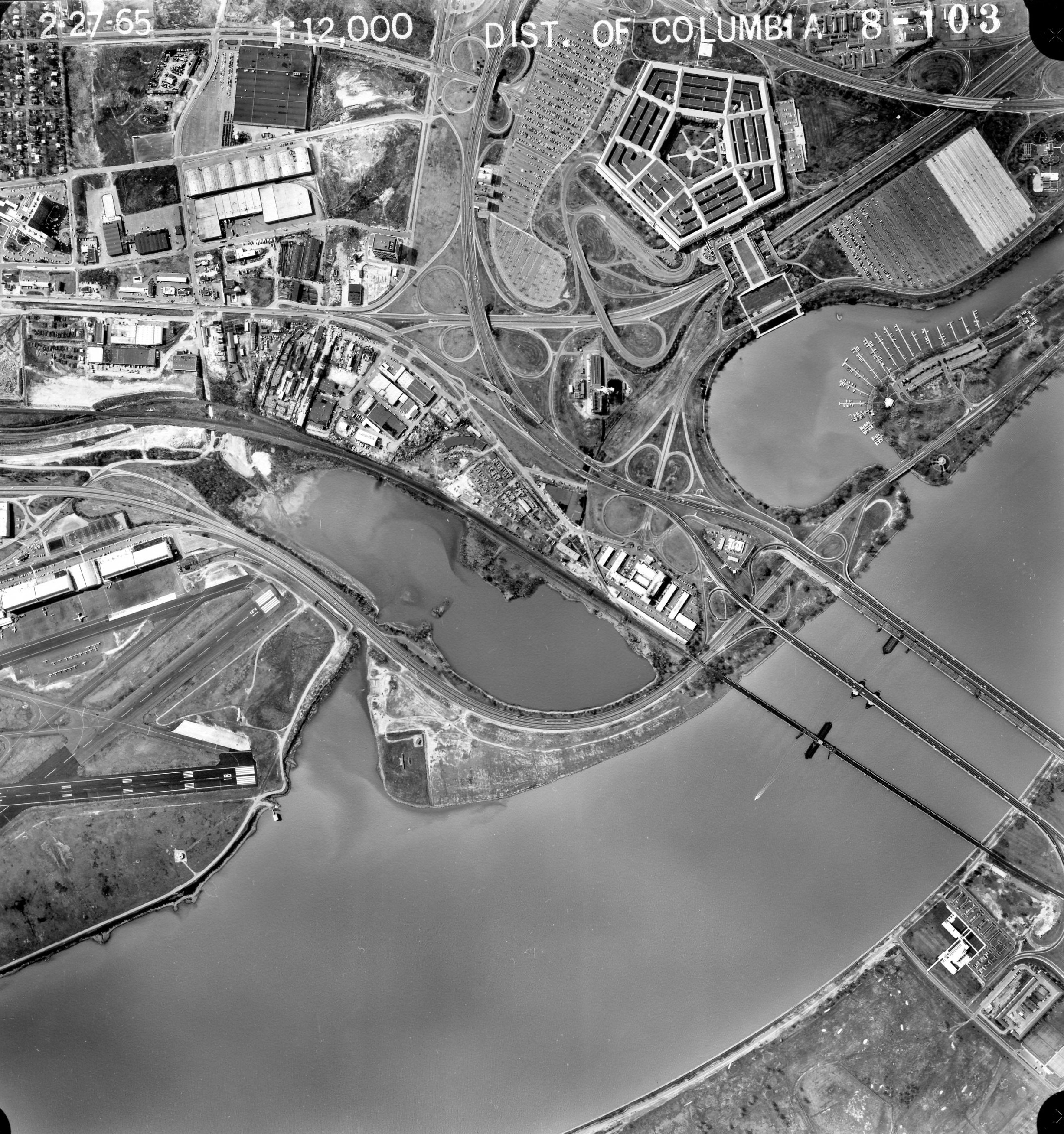
Aerial view of the bridges in 1965, with the old Highway Bridge still in place alongside its replacement, the George Mason Memorial Bridge

A new swing-span through-truss bridge called the Highway Bridge or sometimes the 14th Street Bridge, 500 feet (150 m) upriver from the Long Bridge, opened December 15, 1906, to serve streetcars and other non-railroad traffic.

The yellow trolleys of the Mount Vernon Railway used the bridge until 1932 when the line was replaced by buses that eventually became part of the Alexandria, Barcroft and Washington (AB&W) Transit Company.

After the George Mason Bridge was opened in 1962, the Highway Bridge was closed, but there was considerable discussion of reusing the Highway Bridge, perhaps for rush hour only automobile traffic. Nonetheless, the Highway Bridge was finally removed from the site in 1967–1968, and was taken to the Naval Surface Warfare Center, Dahlgren Division, for bombing practice.

In order to remove the Highway Bridge piers and install new Center Bridge piers, the draw spans of the Williams and Long Bridges were opened for barge and crane equipment in 1967. A few years prior to 1967, the railroad bridge had been welded shut, and in order to open it for the crane, that had to be reversed. The draw spans were opened for the last time on March 3, 1969, when the equipment was removed.

=== Pontoon Bridge ===
On July 1, 1942, after two months of work, the War Department opened a pontoon bridge located between the Railroad and Highway bridges. It connected Ohio Drive, then Riverside Drive, to US Highway 1. The bridge was constructed of 30 plank covered pontoons with an asphalt coating for the 12 foot-wide floor. A fixed steel span on the Virginia side provided an opening 30 feet wide and 21 feet high for boats to pass under. Two more fixed spans carried it over the George Washington Parkway. The bridge was built for emergency movement of troops and though it was to allow for civilian use, it never did. Once World War II was over, the bridge was removed in the summer of 1945.

== Modern 14th Street bridges ==
Despite the different names of the Rochambeau, Mason and Williams bridges, and the fact that they were all built separately, the three are often called "The 14th Street Bridge" together.

=== Current Long Bridge ===
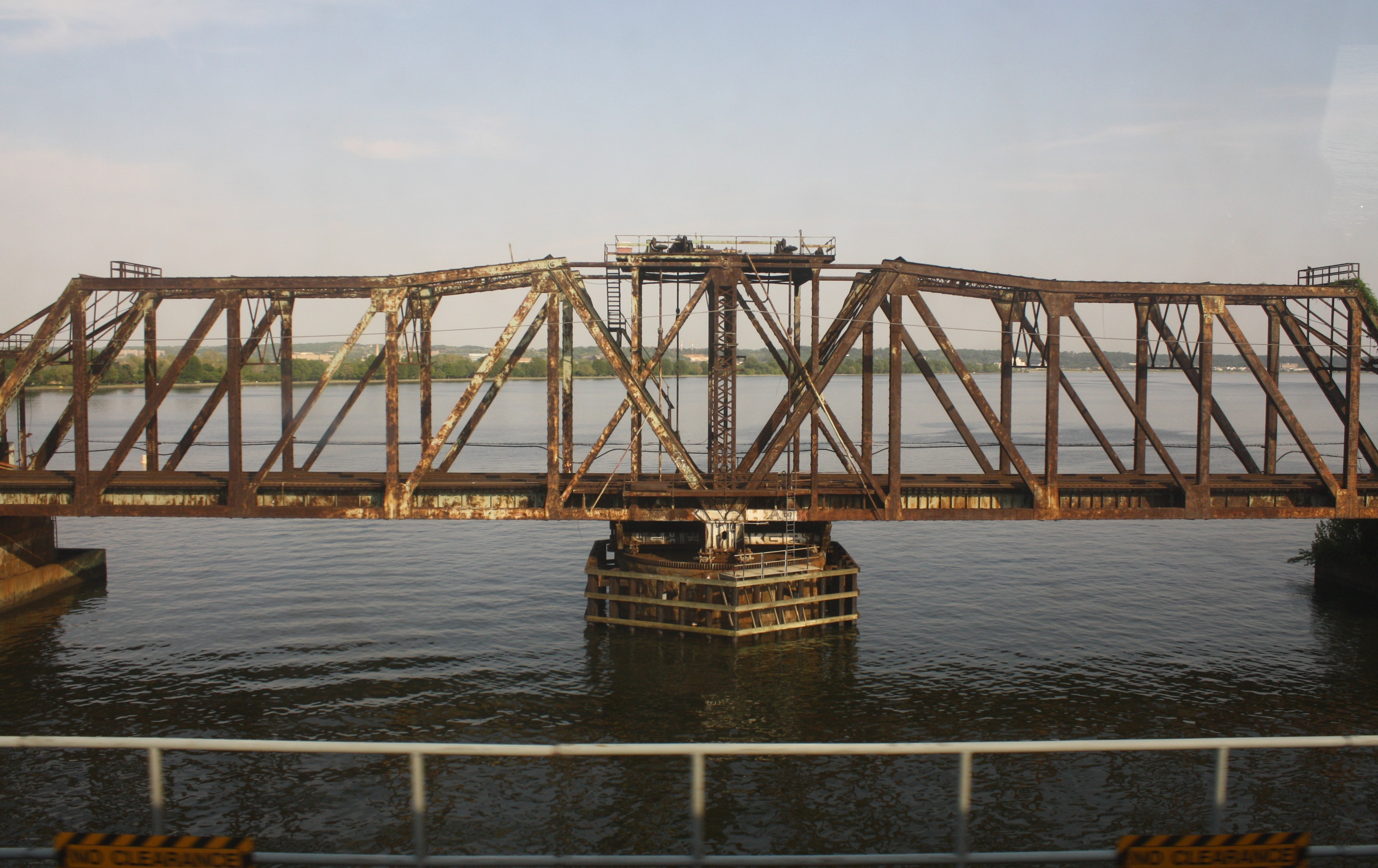
Through-truss swing span of Long Bridge (April 2010)

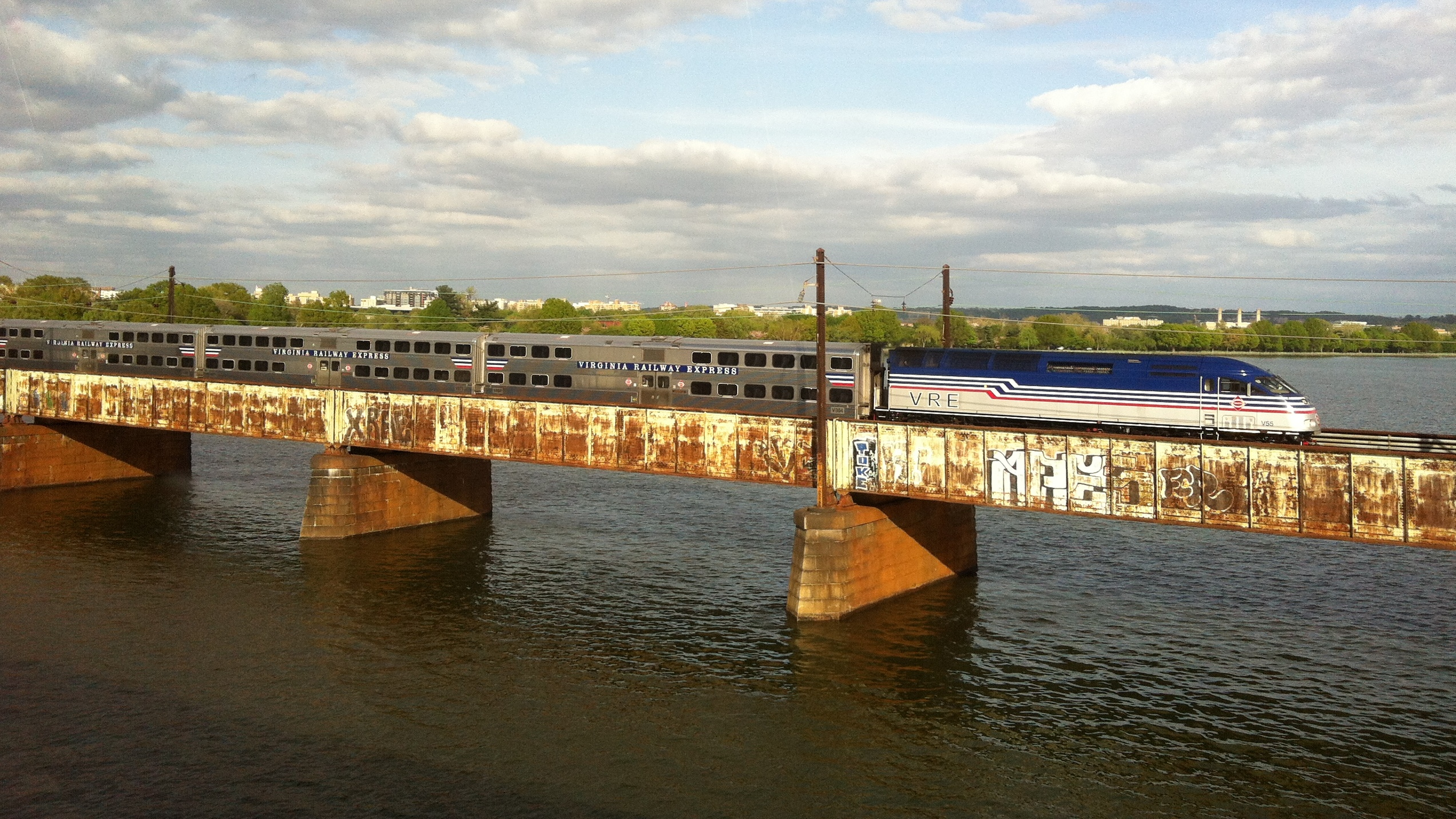
Southbound Virginia Railway Express train on plate girder portion of Long Bridge (April 2013)

The current railroad bridge opened on August 28, 1904, about 150 feet (45 m) upriver from the old bridge. In the early years, the bridge was often referred to as the "Railroad Bridge" to distinguish it from "Highway Bridge". It was also sometimes known as the "14th Street Railroad Bridge". It wasn't until the 1980s, during planning of the Virginia Railway Express (VRE) system, that the railroad bridge again began to be called by the old "Long Bridge" name. VRE began using the bridge in 1992.

The bridge was substantially reconstructed starting in mid-1942, with 11 new supplemental piers between the original truss spans and steel plate girders replacing the iron and steel truss spans. Work completed on November 9, 1943.

When the Mason Bridge was completed in 1962, it put an end to almost all use of the Long Bridge's draw span. The last time it was opened was March 1969 to allow barges used in the removal of the old Highway Bridge to pass through. The tender's control house, or shanty, on top of the draw remained - often used as a billboard for Georgetown crew races until it was removed in late 1982 or early 1983.

The bridge was rehabilitated in 2016 and CSX determined that it was sufficient to meet their freight needs, but in 2019 DDOT and FRA reported that a second bridge was needed to serve increased passenger rail needs. A third bridge was also proposed to create a new bicycle/pedestrian crossing. In 2019, Virginia announced that they would pay to build a new rail bridge over the Potomac River north of the Long Bridge.

=== Arland D. Williams, Jr. Memorial Bridge ===
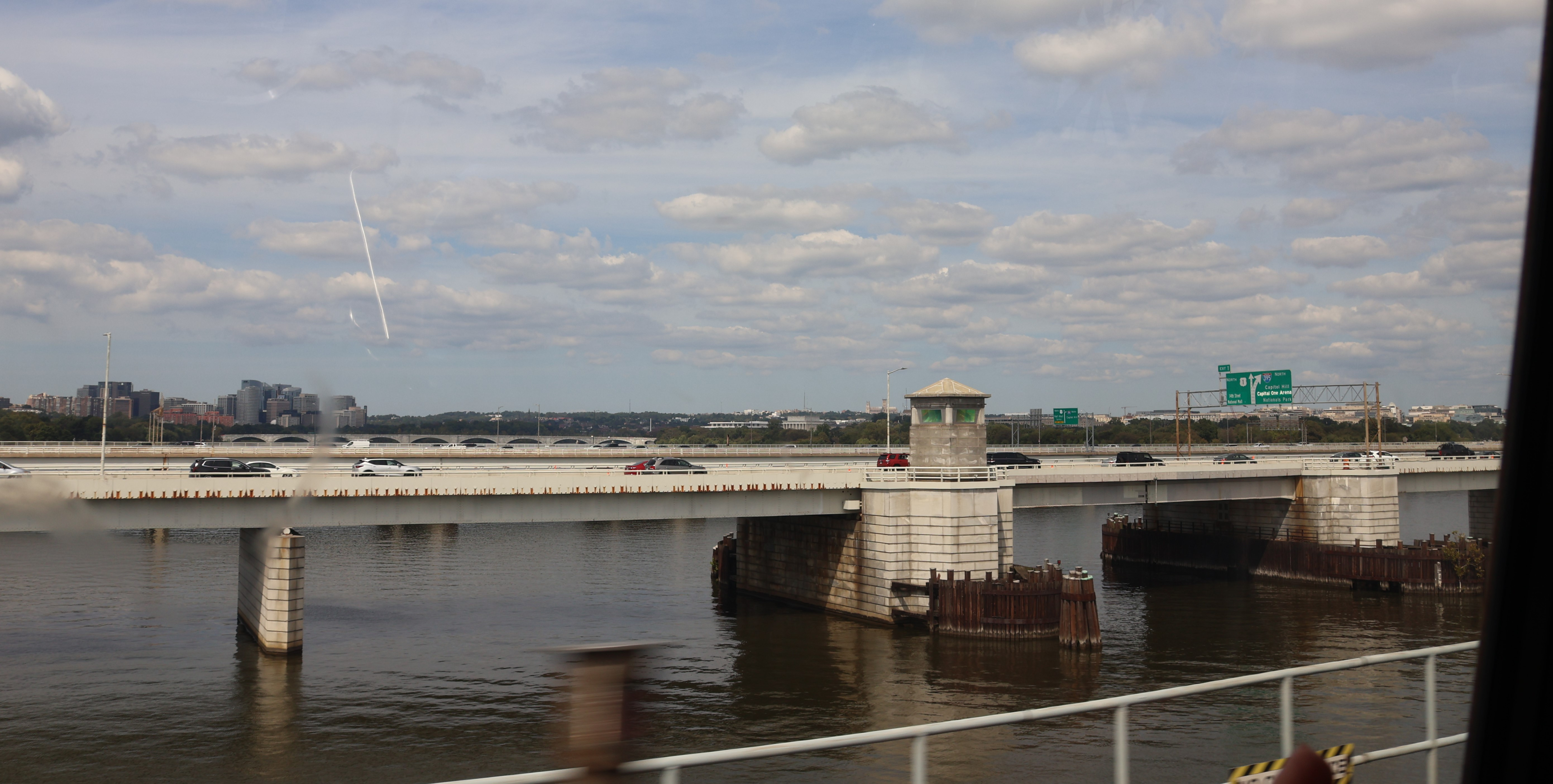
The Arland D. Williams Jr. Memorial Bridge in September 2023 as seen from a Yellow Line train on the Washington Metro (Charles R. Fenwick Bridge).

Planning for a replacement of the Highway Bridge started in the 1940s to deal with expanded traffic in the automobile age. Work on a new single-span, northbound-only 14th Street Bridge began on August 21, 1947, and the new bridge opened on May 9, 1950, with the ribbon cut by Miss D.C., Mary Jane Hayes. The Highway Bridge then became southbound-only, but a 2nd bridge was planned to replace it. The new bridge span incorporated draw spans with a control houses that was designed to complement those on the Arlington Memorial Bridge upstream and on the railroad bridge's swing span downstream.

In 1956, while planning the Jones Point Bridge Congress began to debate what to name it. While one of the first suggestions was to name it after Woodrow Wilson, which eventually it was, Rep. Joel Broyhill (R-VA) suggested naming it for George Mason, or failing that naming the new Highway Bridge for him. This prompted a letter to the editor of the Washington Post suggested it be named for revolutionary war hero Lafayette, since it was near where he led soldiers across the river on the way to Yorktown. A few days later, Charles Parmer a Rochambeau enthusiast and head of Virginia's short-lived Rochambeau Commission, suggested the bridge instead be named for Jean-Baptiste Donatien de Vimeur, comte de Rochambeau. Another letter followed that suggested attaching the name Rochambeau instead to the 14th Street Bridge and that letter caught the attention of Congress member Harry F. Byrd of Virginia who submitted it to the Congressional Record. Broyhill submitted a bill naming the bridge for Mason and Byrd submitted one naming it for Rochambeau, and by the middle of summer a compromise had been worked out naming one span for each. Broyhill resubmitted the compromise bill in 1957 and it passed. The new bridge was dedicated as the Rochambeau Bridge on October 19, 1958, at 2 p.m., at time and date meant to correspond with the time and date that Cornwallis surrendered at Yorktown in 1781.

The last time this bridge was opened was on March 3, 1969, to remove barge and crane equipment that had been floated upriver in 1967 to remove the old Highway Bridge piers and install new center bridge piers.

The bridge underwent extensive repair in 1975–1976 which resulted in a closure of more than a year. Workers gave the bridge a new deck, removed the bascule draw span and replaced the sidewalks with shoulders. The control house remained.

On January 13, 1982, the bridge was damaged by the crash of Air Florida Flight 90. The Boeing 737-222, which had accumulated ice while idling on the runway at National Airport, stalled soon after takeoff, fell on the bridge, and slammed into the iced-over Potomac River. The crash killed 74 passengers and crew, plus four people in cars on the bridge. The repaired span was renamed the Arland D. Williams, Jr. Memorial Bridge on March 13, 1985—following a December 4, 1984 vote—after one of the passengers, who passed a lifeline to five survivors before permitting himself to be rescued. He succumbed to hypothermia and drowned while first responders worked to rescue the last of the survivors. The name Rochambeau Bridge was then shifted to the Center Highway Bridge.

After a series of inspections from 2005 to 2009, the District of Columbia's District Department of Transportation (DDOT) began a $27 million rehabilitation of the northbound main span in 2010. Construction, scheduled to last only a few months, was finally completed in 2011. A 2014 inspection found more problems. Citing the expense and the need to replace or repair several deficient bridges elsewhere in the District, DDOT pushed the date for fixing these problems to 2020. On April 13, 2023, DDOT announced the US Department of Transportation had provided $72 million to help fund the rehabilitation project. The $90 million project, which will also be funded in part by the D.C. government, would start with preliminary engineering and the environmental review for the project later that spring, with the preliminary design expected to be completed that fall. Construction is estimated to take two years.

=== George Mason Memorial Bridge ===
The new George Mason Memorial Bridge opened upstream on January 26, 1962, replacing the old Highway Bridge (then southbound only). The Mason Bridge, unlike the bridges upstream and downstream, could not open for river traffic, thus Potomac River traffic by sea-going vessels traveling above the Long Bridge ceased in 1961.

During the late 1960s, new ramps were constructed between the westbound Shirley Highway and the southbound George Washington Parkway and these eliminated the path between the bridge and the Pentagon. In 1969, the path was connected to the Arlington Memorial Bridge via the Lady Bird Trail and on April 15, 1972 it was connected to Alexandria via the Mount Vernon Trail, of which the Lady Bird Trail became part.

In 1984, the Mason Bridge was closed for several months for a $5.9 million overhaul. The bridge was resurfaced and widened to provide shoulders. The sidewalk was widened and new safety railings were installed between the walkway and the roadway.

On July 25, 1989, the George Mason Bridge gained national notoriety as the scene of the 1989 DC Prostitute Expulsion.

In late 2018, the National Park Service rebuilt and improved the trail ramp between the George Mason Bridge path and East Basin Drive.

=== Rochambeau Bridge ===
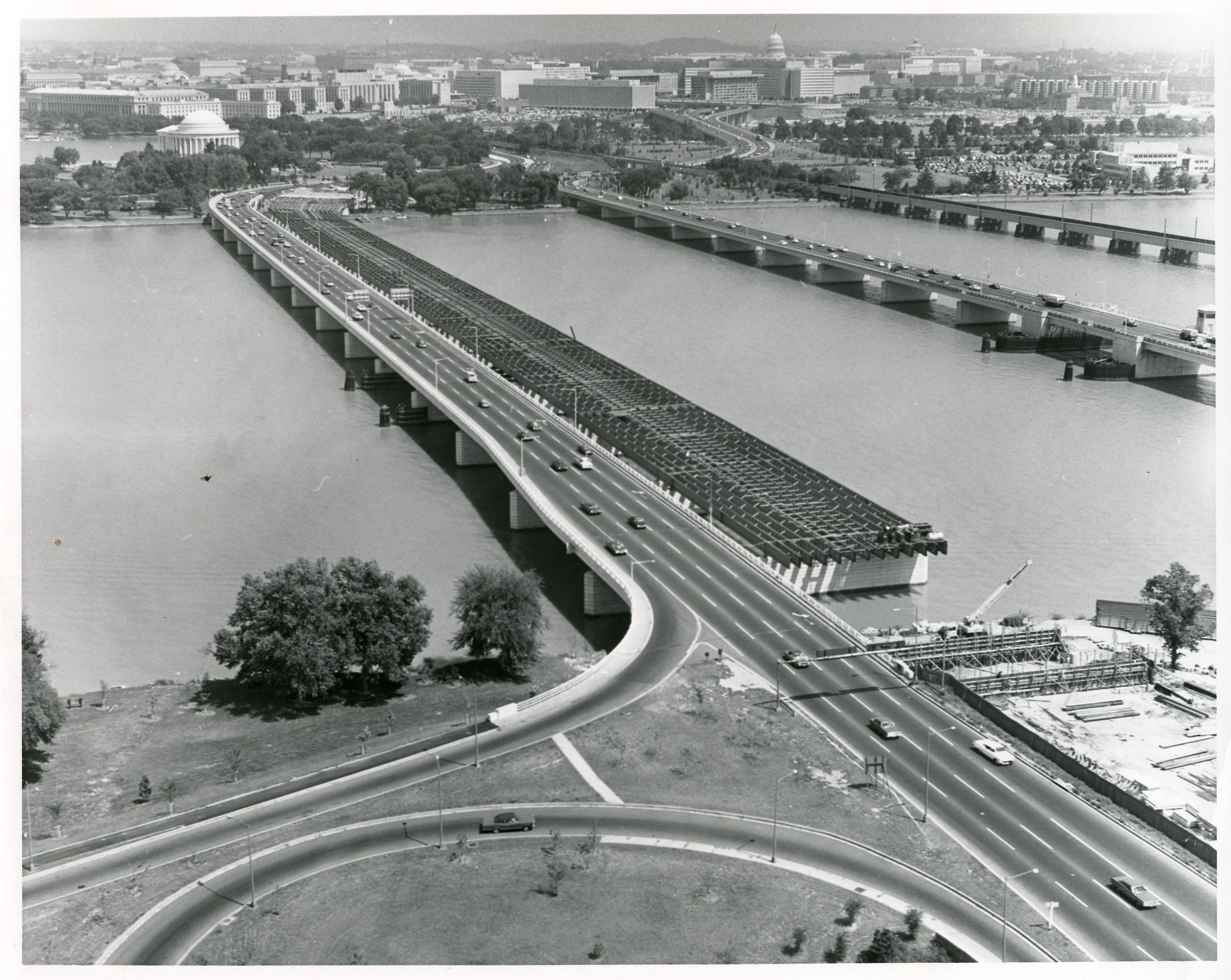
The Rochambeau bridge under construction

On April 5, 1971, a third bridge opened immediately downstream of the Mason Bridge, carrying two express lanes in each direction. Work began in March 1967, but wasn't entirely completed until 1972. The express lanes lead directly to the high-occupancy vehicle lanes on Virginia's section of I-395, though these lanes are only HOV during rush hour. When it opened, the bridge was known as the Center Highway Bridge.

At the time it opened it was only open for bus traffic, making it the longest exclusive busway in the country, but over the years the express lane rules have gradually been reduced. In late 1973, carpoolers were allowed to use the bus lanes during rush hour if the car had at least four passengers. In 1975, cars with four passengers were allowed to use the express lanes at all hours. In 1983, Congress passed a law to open the express lanes to all vehicles except during rush hour, when they were restricted to buses, car pools and emergency vehicles and that went into effect in 1985. In 1987, due to increased congestion, the Virginia Department of Transportation extended the HOV end time from 6 p.m. to 6:30 p.m., but later that year it was rolled back after Rep. Stan Parris passed a federal law that would deny Virginia $2.4 million if the rush hour extension remained. In the same year, the VDOT opened the northbound HOV lanes on the bridge to all users to alleviate congestion caused by reconstruction of the SE-SW Freeway. In early 1989, Virginia, in a deal with Rep. Parris, lowered the HOV restrictions from four people per vehicle to three in order to regain control over the management of the HOV lanes. In late 2019, the HOV lanes on 395 changed to High-Occupancy Toll (HOT) lanes, and as a result the northbound lane on the Rochambeau Bridge became a HOT lane as well.

On March 13, 1985, following the 1982 Air Florida Flight 90 crash, the downstream bridge was renamed the Arland D. Williams, Jr. Memorial Bridge to honor one of the passengers who died saving the lives of other survivors during the crash. The name Rochambeau Bridge was simultaneously transferred to the Center Highway Bridge. However, the bronze marker naming the bridge was not shifted with the name.

=== Charles R. Fenwick Bridge ===
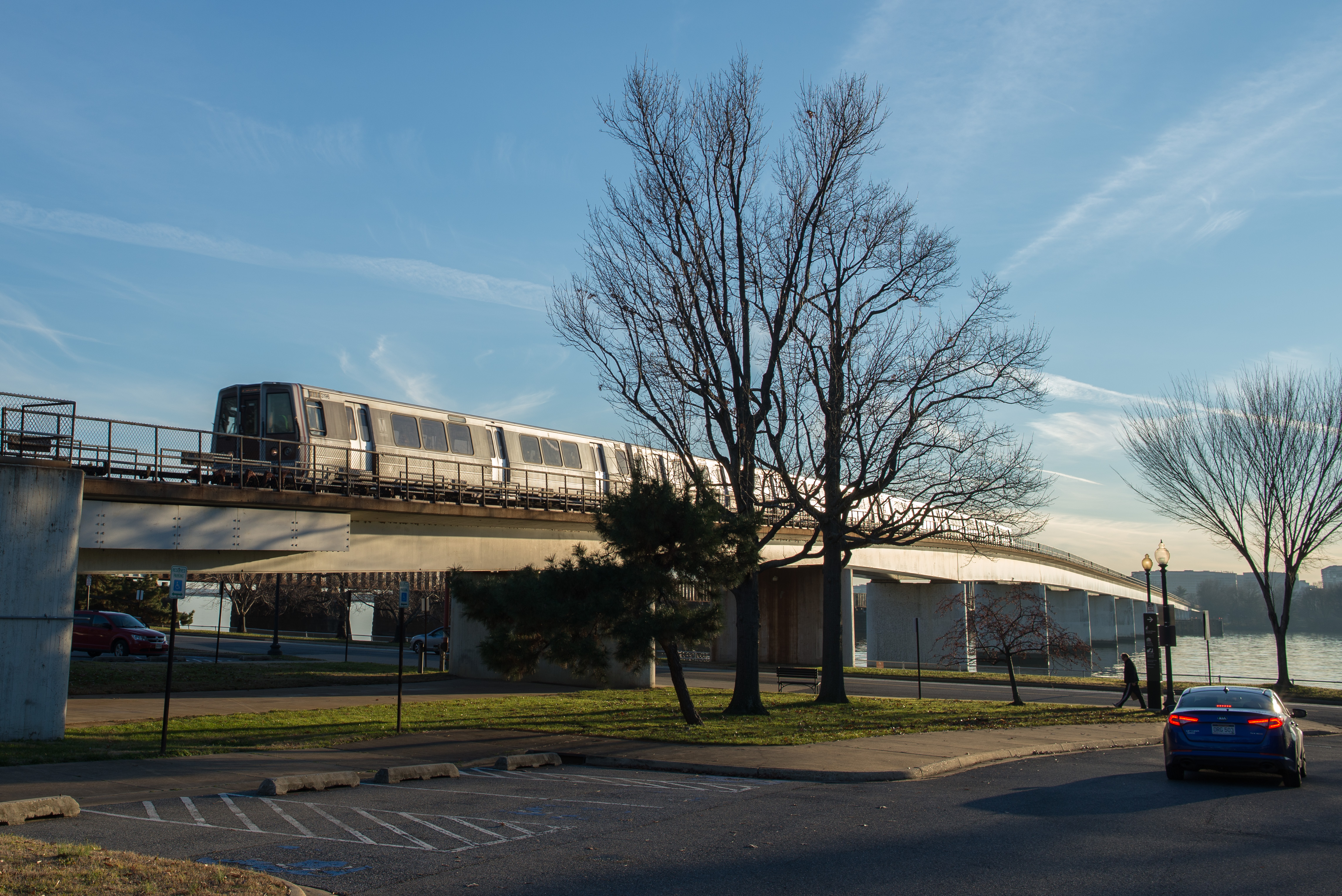
Northbound Yellow Line train on Fenwick Bridge in December 2014

The final bridge, the Charles R. Fenwick Bridge, carrying the Yellow Line, opened on April 30, 1983. Based on the recommendation of Washington Post reporter Jack Eisen, the bridge was named for Charles R. Fenwick by the Metro Board on September 22, 1983. Fenwick was a Virginia state legislator from the Washington suburbs who sponsored legislation to create Metro. He died in 1968.

== See also ==
- List of crossings of the Potomac River
- Bridge Tender's House (artwork), an installation on the bridge's old watchtower
- List of bridges documented by the Historic American Engineering Record in Washington, D.C.
