= List of Lenny Skutniks =

"Lenny Skutniks" is a generic term for notable people who are invited to sit in the gallery at a State of the Union address or other joint meeting of the United States Congress. Lenny Skutnik was the first such guest, who was celebrated for his heroism following the crash of Air Florida Flight 90 on January 13, 1982. Skutnik dove into the icy Potomac River, saving the life of a passenger. For this act he was commended by U.S. president Ronald Reagan during the annual State of the Union speech held later that month.

Since then, the term "Lenny Skutniks" has been used to refer to individuals invited to sit in the gallery, and often cited by the President, during the speech. President Reagan's invitation, and the reference to Skutnik's heroism within his speech, may have been an attempt to include a human interest story within the speech. The practice fell out of favor during the presidency of George H. W. Bush. Bill Clinton restored the practice upon assuming the Presidency, and it has continued under George W. Bush, Barack Obama, Donald Trump and Joe Biden.

== Partial list of Lenny Skutniks ==
1982
Lenny Skutnik was indicated as an example of the American ideal; immediately before noting Skutnik, Reagan first pointed out Jeremiah Denton, a Senator who had formerly been held as a prisoner of war in Vietnam.
1984
Reagan pointed to Sergeant Stephen Trujillo, a medic during the Invasion of Grenada in October 1983.
1999
Clinton pointed out Rosa Parks for her role as an icon of the American Civil Rights Movement. Sammy Sosa, a right fielder in Major League Baseball who had surpassed Roger Maris's home run total of 61 in a single season, was pointed out for his athletic achievements and role in rededicating a rebuilt hospital in the Dominican Republic.
2000
Clinton pointed to a number of people: Tom Mauser, father of Columbine victim Daniel Mauser and anti-gun advocate; Lloyd Bentsen, former United States Senator from Texas and former Treasury Secretary; Tipper Gore, then Second Lady of the United States; Carlos Rosas, a father from Minnesota; Captain John Cherrey, airman who served during the Kosovo Conflict; and William Cohen, then-Secretary of Defense, with his wife, Janet Langhart.
2001
George W. Bush pointed to Lisa Beamer, widow of Todd Beamer, a victim of the September 11 attacks aboard United Airlines Flight 93, who possibly led the charge against that aircraft's hijackers. He also noted Tony Blair, then Prime Minister of the United Kingdom.
2003
Bush welcomed and mentioned two members of the new Afghan government, interim leader Chairman Hamid Karzai and Minister of Women's Affairs, Dr. Sima Samar. He also noted Shannon Spann, widow of CIA officer and Marine Michael Spann who was killed in Mazar-e-Sharif. Finally, Bush thanked Hermis Moutardier and Christina Jones, two flight attendants on American Airlines Flight 63, aboard which an attempted suicide bombing was prevented by their actions.
2004
Bush referred to Adnan Pachachi, the President of the Iraqi Governing Council.
2007
Four individuals were pointed to in the "heroes box": Dikembe Mutombo, a basketball player originally from the Democratic Republic of the Congo who had recently helped fund the building of a hospital in Kinshasa; Wesley Autrey, a New York City construction worker who saved a man who had fallen onto subway tracks; Julie Aigner-Clark, creator of the Baby Einstein toy line; and Sergeant Tommy Riemann, injured in Operation Iraqi Freedom.
2010
Leonard Abess was the longtime owner and CEO of City National Bank of Florida and was cited by Barack Obama for distributing the $60 million sale price of his bank to over 400 current and former employees in the form of bonuses. Although not mentioned in the address, Chesley Sullenberger, who had saved the passengers of his jetliner which he had ditched in Hudson River, was a guest of the President.
2011
Daniel Hernández Jr., the man who saved Gabby Giffords's life during the 2011 Tucson shooting, was a guest of President Obama.
2012
Obama cited Jackie Bray, a single mom from North Carolina who had lost her job and retrained in a program created by Siemens and Central Piedmont Community College. Laurene Powell Jobs, the widow of Steve Jobs, was shown when the president mentioned Steve Jobs. Obama also mentioned Bryan Ritterby, who was hired by a wind turbine manufacturer; Richard Cordray, the director of the United States Consumer Financial Protection Bureau; and Debbie Bosanke, the secretary of Warren Buffett, in conjunction with the discussion of the proposed Buffett Rule.
2013
Bobak Ferdowsi, a systems engineer at NASA's Jet Propulsion Laboratory, had gained media fame in August 2012, when he wore an unusual mohawk hairstyle during the Mars Science Laboratory Curiosity landing. Ferdowsi's father was an immigrant to the United States from Iran, and his presence was meant "to highlight President Barack Obama's call for more visas for skilled immigrants in the fields of math, science and engineering."
2014
Army Ranger Sergeant First Class Cory Remsburg, who was almost killed by a massive roadside bomb in Afghanistan and suffered a three-month coma and partial paralysis as a result, was seated next to Michelle Obama and applauded.
2016
Former United States Air Force staff sergeant Spencer Stone, who helped foil a terrorist attack on a Paris-bound train travelling from Amsterdam via Brussels in August 2015, was a guest of First Lady Michelle Obama.
2018
President Donald Trump recognized Coast Guard Petty Officer Ashley Leppert, who rescued dozens of people using a helicopter during Hurricane Harvey; firefighter David Dahlberg, who rescued 62 children from a California wildfire; Steve Staub, a business owner who hired more workers on account of recent tax cuts, along with one of his employees, Corey Adams; Preston Sharp, a twelve-year-old who organized the placing of over 40,000 American flags on the graves of veterans; Evelyn Rodriguez, Freddie Cuevas, Elizabeth Alvarado, and Robert Mickens, the parents of two girls who were murdered by members of the MS-13 criminal gang; Homeland Security agent Celestino Martinez, who has spent his career fighting violent street gangs; police officer Ryan Holets and his wife Rebecca, who adopted a baby from a homeless woman; Army Staff Sergeant Justin Peck, who rescued U.S. Navy SEALs Senior Chief Petty Officer Kenton Stacy; Fred and Cindy Warmbier, parents of Otto Warmbier, who died shortly after being released in a vegetative state caused by falling comatose due to botulism whilst in captivity in North Korea; and Ji Seong-ho, who escaped from North Korea and whose siblings reportedly had to eat dirt to assuage their hunger.
2019
President Trump noted the presence of World War II military veterans Joseph Reilly, Irving Locker, and Herman Zeitchik while recognizing the 75th anniversary of the "D-Day" Normandy landings, and astronaut Buzz Aldrin, for the 50th anniversary of the Apollo 11 Moon landing. In discussing criminal justice reform, he acknowledged Alice Marie Johnson, a drug offender whose sentence he commuted, and Matthew Charles, the first person released from prison under the First Step Act. In discussing his immigration policies, Trump referred to Debra Bissell, Heather Armstrong, and Madison Armstrong, who he said had two family members "shot to death in their Reno, Nevada, home by an illegal alien," as well as Immigration and Customs Enforcement Special Agent Elvin Hernandez. Trump recognized Grace Eline, a 10-year-old survivor of childhood cancer and fundraiser for cancer research. In the portion of the speech on terrorism and national defense, Trump discussed Tom Wibberley, whose son was killed in the 2000 USS Cole bombing; Timothy Matson, a SWAT officer injured in the Pittsburgh synagogue shooting; Judah Samet, a Holocaust survivor who was also present at the Pittsburgh shooting; and Joshua Kaufman, another Holocaust survivor who was interned at the Dachau concentration camp, the liberation of which included Zeitchik, recognized earlier in the speech. After Trump noted that the speech was being given on Samet's 81st birthday, attendees interrupted the speech to sing "Happy Birthday to You" to Samet.
2023
The family of Tyre Nichols were guests at the 2023 State of the Union Address, in which President Biden called for reform in law enforcement to prevent further deaths like Nichols'. Brandon Tsay, who stopped the Monterey Park shooter, was also a guest and had received a call from President Biden thanking him for his bravery.
2026
The United States Olympic Men's Hockey team were the guests at the 2026 State of the Union Address following their gold medal win.
