= Lenny Skutnik =

Civil servant and civilian hero (born 1953)

Martin Leonard Skutnik III (born 1953 in Mississippi, known as Lenny) is a retired employee of the United States Congressional Budget Office who, on January 13, 1982, saved the life of Priscilla Tirado following the crash of Air Florida Flight 90 into the frozen Potomac River, Washington, D.C. As passengers were being rescued, Tirado was too weak to take hold of the line dropped from a helicopter. Skutnik, one of hundreds of bystanders, dove into the icy water and brought her to the river bank.

U.S. President Ronald Reagan invited Skutnik to attend the 1982 State of the Union address on January 26, 1982, where he sat next to First Lady Nancy Reagan; Reagan praised Skutnik as manifesting "the spirit of American heroism at its finest". Since then, others invited to sit in the Presidential gallery and honored in the president's speech have often been called Lenny Skutniks.

Skutnik received the United States Coast Guard's Gold Lifesaving Medal, the Carnegie Hero Fund Medal, and various other tributes. In 2010 he retired from his position as a printing and distribution assistant for the Congressional Budget Office.

== See also ==
- List of Lenny Skutniks
- Arland D. Williams Jr.
