= Samuel Finzi =

Bulgarian-German actor

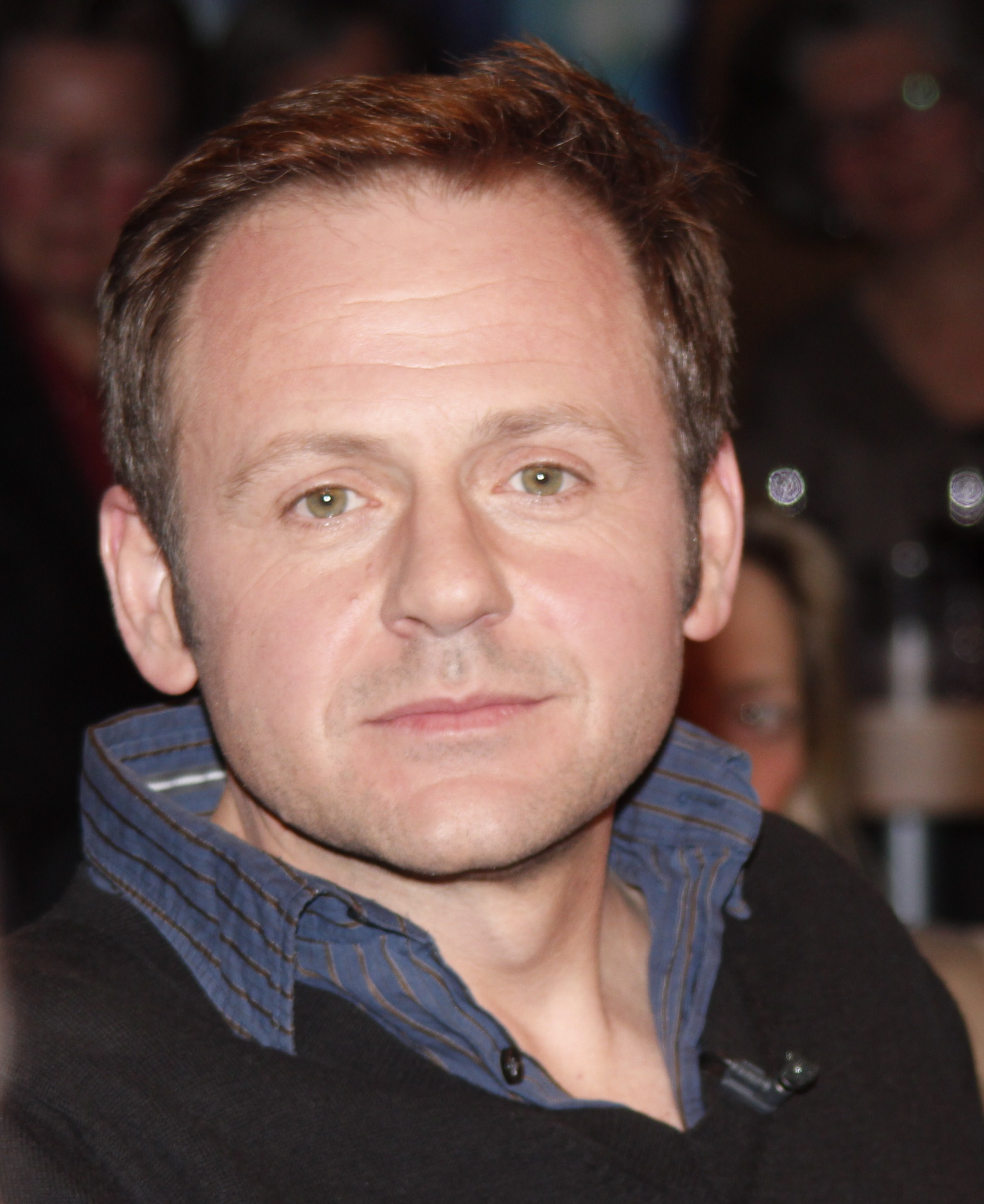
- Born: Plovdiv, Bulgaria
- Occupation: Actor
- Years active: 1989-present
- Spouse: Dimitra Petrou (died 2004)
- Partner: Sorrel Jardine
- Children: 2
- Father: Itzhak Fintzi

Samuel Finzi (Bulgarian: Самуел Финци) is a Bulgarian-German actor. Since the late 1980s, he has hundreds of film, television, and theatrical credits. He played the title role in the crime series Flemming (2009–2012), and plays a prominent role as a Russian agent in the 2026 Netflix German spy drama series Unfamiliar.

== Early life and education ==
Born in Plovdiv, Bulgaria, Samuel Finzi is the son of actor Itzhak Fintzi. He is of Bulgarian-Jewish descent.

Finzi performed in his first theatre and film roles while still a student.

== Career ==
Finzi has hundreds of film, television, and stage credits from the late 1980s onwards. He moved to Germany in 1989, and soon came into contact with directors who have had a major influence on European theatre and film. He has worked in the theatre with directors such as Benno Besson, Dimiter Gotscheff, Frank Castorf, Jürgen Gosch, and Robert Wilson. In film, his collaborations with Michael Glawogger, Oliver Hirschbiegel, Peter Popzlatev, Sönke Wortmann, and Til Schweiger have extended his popularity to a wider audience. He also played the title role in the crime series Flemming.

Finzi has performed in many film and television productions, including Kokowääh, In Between Days, Même Dieu est venu nous voir ("Even God Came to See Us"), and Vaterspiele ("Father Games").

In 2013 he starred alongside his son, Ezra Finzi, in the movie Aschenbrödel und der gestiefelte Kater.

In 2014, he played six leading roles at the Deutsches Theater,the Maxim Gorki Theater, and the Volksbühne, in Berlin, and at the Schauspielhaus in Leipzig.

In March 2023, he acted in a stage adaptation of A Horse Walked Into a Bar, a 2014 novel by David Grossman. The play toured to the National Theatre in Sofia.

Finzi plays a Russian agent in the 2026 Netflix German spy drama series Unfamiliar.

== Awards ==
Finzi has received several awards for his acting, including the Berlin Theatre Prize in 2011. Between 1993 and 2011, he received ten acting awards.

These include:

- 1993: Critics' Prize for Best New Actor in Nordrhein-Westfalen for The Seagull
- 1994: 13th Theater Festival NRW: Prize for Best New Actor for The Seagull
- 1995: Critics’ Prize: Best Actor of the Year in Nordrhein-Westfalen for The Cherry Orchard and Swan Songs
- 1996: Advancement Award for Dramatic Arts of the city of Düsseldorf for Ein Monat in Dachau (A Month in Dachau)
- 2001: Golden Chest, Best Male Performer, International Television Festival Plovdiv, Bulgaria for Devil’s Tail
- 2009: Best Actor at the Mess Theater Festival Sarayevo for Ivanov
- 2010: Best Actor at the MOT Theater Festival Skopje for Diary of a Madman
- 2011: Best Actor at the Skena Up Theater Festival Pristina for Diary of a Madman
- 2011: German Comedy Prize in the category Film Comedy for Kokowääh
- 2011: Theater Prize Berlin 2011, Prussian Maritime Trading Foundation, for his entire work in the theater

== Personal life ==
Finzi was married to Dimitra Petrou for 14 years before she was diagnosed with a brain tumour in 2004, and died within 20 hours, aged 39.

He has two children with French casting director Sorrel Jardine.

== Selected filmography ==
=== Film ===
- 1989: Moi, la Comtesse (Director: Petar Popzlatev)
- 1989: Parcheta lyubov (Director: Ivan Tscherkelov)
- 1989: Razvodat predi i Razvodat sega (Director: Georgi Jacky Stoev)
- 1989: Razvodi, razvodi... (Director: Kosta Bikov)
- 1990: Das Lager (Director: Georgi Djulgerov)
- 1990: Nemirnata ptitza lyubov (Director: Rangel Vulchanov)
- 1994: Die verbotene Frucht (Director: Krasimir Krumov)
- 1998: Die Unschuld der Krähen (Director: Horst Johann Sczerba)
- 1998: Sofia – Sick of it all (Director: Nils Willbrandt)
- 1998: Und alles wegen Mama (Director: Hermine Huntgeburth)
- 2000: The Farewell (Director: Jan Schütte)
- 2000: Deutschlandspiel (Director: Hans-Christoph Blumenberg)
- 2000: Now or Never: Time Is Money (Director: Lars Büchel)
- 2000: Stunde der Wahrheit (Director: Matthias Tiefenbacher)
- 2000: Perfect Sight (Director: Sören Voigt)
- 2001: Auf Herz und Nieren (Director: Thomas Jahn)
- 2001: The Devil’s Tail (Director: Dimitar Petkov)
- 2001: Même Dieu est venu nous voir (Director: Peter Popzlatev)
- 2001: Posseteni ot gospoda (Director: Peter Popzlatev)
- 2001: Santa ein Weihnachtsmärchen (Director: Jophi Ries)
- 2002: Blueberry Hill (Director: Aleksandr Morfov)
- 2002: Gebürtig (Director: Lukas Stepanik und Robert Schindel)
- 2002: Rapsodiya v byalo (Director: Tedi Moskov)
- 2003: Das Wunder von Bern (Director: Sönke Wortmann)
- 2003: Hamlet X (Director: Herbert Fritsch)
- 2003: In schlechter Gesellschaft (Director: Michael Karen)
- 2004: Delphinsommer (Director: Jobst Oetzmann)
- 2005: Aller Tage Abend (Director: Andreas Schimmelbusch)
- 2005: Just an Ordinary Jew (Director: Oliver Hirschbiegel)
- 2005: Measures to Better the World (Director: Jakob Hüfner and Jörn Hintzer)
- 2007: Der Totenwächter (Director: Ilian Simeonov)
- 2007: Geburtstag (Director: Lawrence Tooley)
- 2007: Family Rules (Director: Marc Meyer)
- 2008: In Between Days (Director: Lola Randl)
- 2008: Helden aus der Nachbarschaft (Director: Jovan Arsenic)
- 2008: KDD – Kriminaldauerdienst: Letzte Chance (Director: Andreas Prochaska)
- 2009: Das Vaterspiel (Director: Michael Glawogger)
- 2009: Die Liebe und Viktor (Director: Patrick Banush)
- 2009: Lackschaden (Director: Michael Schneider)
- 2009: Pink (Director: Rudolf Thome)
- 2010: Aghet – Ein Völkermord (Director: Eric Friedler)
- 2010: Headshots (Director: Lawrence Tooley)
- 2010: Holy Light (Director: Georgi Tenev)
- 2010: Mondwärts (Director: Aron Lehmann)
- 2011: Men in the City 2 (Director: Simon Verhoeven)
- 2011: Kokowääh (Director: Til Schweiger)
- 2011: Short for Vernesa B. (Director: Jons Vukorep)
- 2012: Alexander Granach – Da geht ein Mensch (Director: Angelika Wittlich)
- 2012: The Rhino and the Dragonfly (Director: Lola Randl)
- 2012: Ludwig II (Director: Peter Sehr)
- 2012: Rückkehr von den Sternen (Director: Franz Müller)
- 2012: The Color of the Chameleon (Director: Emil Hristow)
- 2013: Aschenbrödel und der gestiefelte Kater (Director: Thorsten Künstler)
- 2013: George (Director: Joachim A. Lang)
- 2013: Kokowääh 2 (Director: Til Schweiger)
- 2013: Oktober/November (Director: Götz Spielmann)
- 2013: Generation War (Unsere Mütter, unsere Väter) (Director: Philipp Kadelbach)
- 2014: The Invention of Love (Director: Lola Randl)
- 2014: The Bridges of Sarajevo (Director: Kamen Kalev)
- 2014: Worst Case Scenario (Director: Franz Müller)
- 2015: Punk Berlin 1982 (Director: Oskar Roehler)
- 2016: Fritz Lang (Director: Gordian Maugg)
- 2016: Marie Curie: The Courage of Knowledge (Director: Marie Noëlle)
- 2017: The Captain (Der Hauptmann) (Director: Robert Schwentke)
- 2018: Meine teuflisch gute Freundin (Director: Marco Petry)
- 2018: Klassentreffen 1.0 (Director: Til Schweiger)
- 2018: Herrliche Zeiten (Director: Oskar Roehler)
- 2020: The Wedding (Director: Til Schweiger)
- 2023: Seneca – On the Creation of Earthquakes (Director: Robert Schwentke)
- 2024: The Black Sea (Director: Crystal Moselle)

=== TV ===
- 2001: Studers erster Fall (TV film) (Director: Sabine Boss)
- 2002: Am Ende der Hochzeitsnacht (TV film) (Director: Olaf Kreinsen)
- 2003: Schimanski: Asyl (TV series) (Director: Edward Berger)
- 2006–2012: Tatort (TV series)
- 2006: Kunstfehler (TV film) (Director: Marcus O. Rosenmüller)
- 2009: Ein Sommer mit Paul (TV film) (Director: Claudia Garde)
- 2009: Sieben Tage (TV film) (Director: Petra K. Wagner)
- 2009–2012: Flemming (TV series)
- 2010: Die Akte Golgatha (TV film, Director: Zoltan Spirandelli)
- 2026: Unfamiliar (TV series)

== Theatrography (selection) ==
- 1990: Performance and Punishment after Fyodor Dostoyevsky in various roles at Hebbel-Theater Berlin and Eurokaz Festival Zagreb (Director: Ivan Stanev)
- 1991: Hermaphroditus by Ivan Stanev in various roles at Hebbel-Theater and Mickery Theater Amsterdam (Director: Ivan Stanev)
- 1992: Leonce and Lena by Georg Büchner as Büchner at Schauspielhaus Düsseldorf (Director: Dimiter Gotscheff)
- 1992 Voycek by Georg Büchner (Director: Dimiter Gotscheff)
- 1993–1997: The Seagull by Anton Chekhov as Kostja at Schauspielhaus Köln (Director: Dimiter Gotscheff)
- 1994: Caligula by Albert Camus as Cherea at Schauspielhaus Köln (Director: Werner Schroeter)
- 1994: Die Straßenecke (The Street Corner) by Hans Henny Jahnn at Thalia Theater Hamburg (Director: Dimiter Gotscheff)
- 1994: Leonce and Lena by Georg Büchner as Handwerksbursche at Schauspielhaus Düsseldorf (Director: Dimiter Gotscheff)
- 1994–1996: Ein Monat in Dachau (a Month in Dachau) by Wladimir Sorokin in various roles at Schauspielhaus Düsseldorf (Director: Dimiter Gotscheff)
- 1995: The Vast Domain by Arthur Schnitzler as Portier at Thalia Theater Hamburg (Director: Jürgen Flimm)
- 1995: The Cherry Orchard by Anton Chekhov as Carlotta and Firs at Schauspielhaus Düsseldorf (Director: Dimiter Gotscheff)
- 1995: Swan Songs by Anton Chekhov in various roles at Schauspielhaus Düsseldorf (Director: Stefan Moskov)
- 1996: On the Big Street by Anton Chekhov as Borzov at Thalia Theater Hamburg (Director: Dimiter Gotscheff)
- 1996: The Glass Slipper by Ferenc Molnár as Portier at Thalia Theater Hatburg (Director: Jürgen Flimm)
- 1996: The Hour Since We Didn’t Know Anything About Each Other by Peter Handke in various roles at Thalia Theater Hamburg (Director: Jürgen Gosch)
- 1996: The Threepenny Opera by Bertolt Brecht as Smith at Thalia Theater Hamburg (Director: Katharina Thalbach)
- 1996–1999: Time Rocker by Lou Reed in various roles at Thalia Theater Hamburg (Director: Robert Wilson)
- 1997–2000: Germania 3. Ghosts on Dead Man by Heiner Müller as Stalin at Deutschen Schauspielhaus Hamburg (Director: Dimiter Gotscheff)
- 1998–2000: Blue in Blue by George Gershwin in various roles at Thalia Theater Hamburg (Director: Stefan Moskov)
- 1999: Don Quixote by Miguel de Cervantes in various roles at Jahrhunderthalle Bochum (Director: Dimiter Gotscheff)
- 1999: King Lear by William Shakespeare as Kent at Deutsches Schauspielhaus Hamburg (Director: Dimiter Gotscheff)
- 1999: Saint Joan of the Stockyards by Bertolt Brecht as Mauler at Schauspielhaus Zürich (Director: Benno Besson)
- 1999–2000: Phèdre by Jean Racine as Theratenes at Schauspielhaus Bochum (Director: Werner Schroeter)
- 2001: Powder Keg by Dejan Dukovski in various roles at Steirischen Herbst and at Schauspielhaus Graz, Version I (Director: Dimiter Gotscheff)
- 2002: Amphitryon by Heinrich von Kleist as Sosias at Schauspielhaus Hamburg (Director: Jürgen Gosch)
- 2002: To the Wedding by John Berger in various roles at Schauspielhaus Hamburg (Director: Brigitte Landes)
- 2002: Königsberg by Andrei Nekrasov as Vlad at Volksbühne Berlin (Director: Andrei Nekrasov)
- 2002–2005: The Lieutenant from Inishmore by Martin McDonagh as Padraic at Burgtheater Vienna (Director: Dimiter Gotscheff)
- 2003: Black Battles with Dogs by Bernard-Marie Koltès as Alboury at Volksbühne Berlin (Director: Dimiter Gotscheff)
- 2003: Platonov by Anton Chekhov as Michail Vasiljevitch Platonov at Schauspiel Frankfurt (Director: Dimiter Gotscheff)
- 2004: McTeague by Frank Norris as Zerkov at Volksbühne Berlin (Director: Frank Castorf)
- 2004: Gambler by Fyodor Dostoyevsky in various roles at Volksbühne Berlin (Director: Johan Simons)
- 2005–2006: Amphitryon by Heinrich von Kleist as Amphitryon at Deutschen Theater Berlin (Director: Stefan Bachmann)
- 2005-: Iwanov by Anton Chekhov as Iwanov at Volksbühne Berlin (Director: Dimiter Gotscheff)
- 2005-: Philoktet by Heiner Müller as Neoptolemos at Volksbühne Berlin (Director: Dimiter Gotscheff)
- 2006: The Grande Bouffe by Marco Ferreri as Philippe at Volksbühne Berlin (Director: Dimiter Gotscheff)
- 2006: Volpone by Ben Jonson as Volpone at Deutsches Theater Berlin (Director: Dimiter Gotscheff)
- 2006–2008: Three Stars in Search of a Cook by Ivan Panteleev in various roles at Deutsches Theater Berlin (Director: Ivan Panteleev)
- 2006-: The Persians by Aeschylus as Xerxes and Messenger at Deutsches Theater Berlin (Director: Dimiter Gotscheff)
- 2007: Suicides by Nikolaj Erdmans as Podsekalnikov at Volksbühne Berlin (Director: Dimiter Gotscheff)
- 2007: The Bat by Johann Strauss as Alfred at Deutsches Theater Berlin (Director: Michael Thalheimer)
- 2007–2009: Anatomy Titus Fall of Rome – A Shakespeare Commentary according to William Shakespeare by Heiner Müller at Deutsches Theater Berlin (Director: Dimiter Gotscheff)
- 2008: The Powder Keg by Dejan Dukovski as Volpone at Deutsches Theater Berlin, Version II (Director: Dimiter Gotscheff)
- 2008–2009: King Ubu by Alfred Jarry as Ubu at Volksbühne Berlin (Director: Dimiter Gotscheff)
- 2008-: Songs of my mind – A Tribute to Stevie Wonder, Evening of Song with Samuel Finzi and Band at Deutsches Theater Berlin
- 2008-: Diary of a Madman by Nikolai Gogol as Poprischtschin at Deutsches Theater Berlin (Director: Hanna Rudolph)
- 2010–2011: The Man Without a Past by Aki Kaurismäki in various roles at Deutsches Theater Berlin (Director: Dimiter Gotscheff)
- 2010–2011: Consider the Lobster by David Foster Wallace a solo evening at Volksbühne Berlin (Director: Ivan Panteleev)
- 2010-: The Hospital Room Ward No. 6 by Anton Chekhov as Andrej Efimyc at Deutsches Theater Berlin (Director: Dimiter Gotscheff)
- 2012: Infinite Jest by David Foster Wallace in various roles at Hebbel-Theater Berlin (Director: Matthias Lilienthal)
- 2012-: The Drinker by Hans Fallada as Erin Sommer at Maxim-Gorki-Theater Berlin and Schauspiel Leipzig (Director: Sebastian Hartmann)
- 2012: Shakespeare. Plays for Murderers, Victims and Others by Frank Günther, Heiner Müller, Manfred Wekwerth, and Thomas Brasch in various roles at Deutsches Theater Berlin (Director: Dimiter Gotscheff)
- 2013: Dali vs Picasso by Fernando Arrabal Terán as Picasso at Théâtre National du Luxembourg (Director: Frank Hoffmann)
- 2013: Don Juan Comes Back from the War by Odon von Horvath as Don Juan at Berliner Ensemble (Director: Luc Bondy)
- 2013: Don Juan Comes Back from the War by Fernando Arrabal Terán as Picasso at Théâtre National du Luxembourg (Director: Frank Hoffmann)
- 2014: Waiting for Godot by Samuel Beckett as Vladimir at Deutsches Theater Berlin and Ruhrfestspiele Recklinghausen (Director: Ivan Panteleev)
