= Nemesis (2020 Swiss film) =

- Directed by: Thomas Imbach
- Produced by: Thomas Imbach; Andrea Štaka; Flora Grolitsch
- Narrated by: Milan Peschel
- Cinematography: Thomas Imbach
- Edited by: David Charap; Thomas Imbach
- Music by: Lukas Langenegger
- Release date: April 2020 (Visions du Réel)
- Running time: 131 minutes
- Country: Switzerland
- Languages: German, English

Nemesis is a Swiss documentary film by Thomas Imbach from 2020. It premiered in April 2020 in competition in Nyon Visions du Réel. The international premiere took place at the International Documentary Film Festival Amsterdam 2020, where the film received the prize for Best Cinematography, awarded by Edward Lachman. The film was also shown at the "secret screenings" during Locarno Film Festival 2020, as well as 55th Karlovy Vary International Film Festival.

== Plot ==
Nemesis explores the destruction of a unique train station in Zurich, and the construction of a new prison and police centre in its place. From the perspective of the filmmaker's window, and with testimony from prisoners awaiting deportation, the film probes how we deal with the extinction of history, and its replacement with total security.

== Production ==
Nemesis was filmed exclusively from the filmmaker's window. Thomas Imbach's dismay at the agonizing death of the freight station prompts him to record the ongoing destruction, the years of standstill and the creation of the new concrete colossus, in order to compose a personal chronicle.

== Reception ==
Jamie Lang, Variety: "As the train station crumbles beneath the metal jaws of an excavator, Imbach tells stories from his past and the impact the station has had on his own life. The heartbreaking tales of confused and scared prisoners, not convicted of any crime yet serving sometimes years-long sentences, accompany construction until the city is no longer visible behind the stories-tall behemoth."

Wendy Ide, Screen Daily: "In terms of its methodology, the film couldn’t be more timely. … Shot on handsome 35 mm, sometimes through telephoto lenses which bring an uncomfortable intimacy with the unwitting subjects, sometimes through wide shots which seem to extend to the edge of the city and beyond, the film looks a treat."
