= The Wedding (2020 film) =

2020 German comedy film

- Theatrical release poster
- Directed by: Til Schweiger
- Written by: Til Schweiger; Lo Malinke
- Produced by: Til Schweiger; Christian Specht
- Starring: Samuel Finzi; Katharina Schüttler; Til Schweiger; Stefanie Stappenbeck; Milan Peschel; Jeanette Hain; Lilli Schweiger
- Cinematography: René Richter
- Edited by: Til Schweiger; Christoph Strothjohann
- Music by: Martin Todsharow
- Production companies: Barefoot Films; Warner Bros. Film Productions Germany; Erfttal Film; SevenPictures Film
- Distributed by: Warner Bros. Pictures
- Release date: 23 January 2020
- Running time: 119 minutes
- Country: Germany
- Language: German

The Wedding (German: Die Hochzeit) is a 2020 German comedy film written, directed, edited and starring Til Schweiger. It is a remake of the Danish film Klassefesten 2 - Begravelsen, Itself a sequel to the 2018 German film Klassentreffen 1.0.

The film was released on 23 January 2020 by Warner Bros. Pictures.

== Cast ==
- Til Schweiger as Thomas
- Samuel Finzi as Nils
- Milan Peschel as Andreas
- Lilli Schweiger as Lili
- Stefanie Stappenbeck as Linda
- Jeanette Hain as Tanja
- Katharina Schüttler as Jette
- Bianca Nawrath as Sarah
- Alessandro Schuster as Oliver
- Timur Bartels as Lenny
