= Zoltan Spirandelli =

German actor

Zoltan Spirandelli is a German film director, actor, producer, and screenwriter.

Born in 1957 in Königstein, he has Italian ancestors of his father's side. His first name is Hungarian. As a child he was cantor in the choir of St. John Church in Kronberg. He has worked at the Hochschule für Musik und Theater Hamburg while he made the short film Lulu. For about ten years he directed short films gaining popularity with his interactive short film The Cock Is Dead. He has since made numerous films for television and worked with actors such as Andrea Sawatzki, Matthias Schweighöfer, Daniel Brühl, Rufus Beck and Ottfried Fischer. He received the Bavarian film award for his only previous feature-length movie Vaya con Dios.

He is the father of Ivan Spirandelli and Karla Spirandelli. Today he lives in Berlin.

== Filmography ==
- 1984: Road Movie (short film)
- 1985: Lulu (short film)
- 1988: The Cock Is Dead (interactive short film) + actor
- 1989: Now All Forests Rest
- 1993: Like Erwin Struntz sex movie made (short film with live-Narrator) + writer, Narrator
- 1995: Anecdote from the last Prussian wars (short film with live-Narrator) + writer, producer
- 1996: Monika (MO-ni-ka) (short film)
- 1998: Ufos over Waterlow (TV) + actor
- 2000: Taboo (TV)
- 2001: Jonathan's love (TV)
- 2002: Vaya con Dios
- 2002: A real man for mum (TV)
- 2004: Inspektor Rolle: heart in emergency (TV series, season 2, episode 1)
- 2004: Inspektor Rolle: death of a model (TV series, season 2, episode 2) + script
- 2004: The colours of love (TV) + actor
- 2005: Beetles for Breakfast (TV)
- 2005: Casanova (TV)
- 2005: Danger: Mother-in-Law! (TV)
- 2006: King of Africa (TV)
- 2006: Suing Dad (TV)
- 2007: How to Catch a Millionaire (TV)
- 2008: Full House (TV series, season 1, Episode 4)
- 2008: Everything is what legal (TV)
- 2008: Stormy times (TV)
- 2009: Doktor Martin - fed (TV series, season 2, Episode 4)
- 2009: Doktor Martin - thoughts on (TV series, season 2, episode 5)
- 2009: Flemming - the mistress of emotions (TV series, season 1, Episode 4)
- 2009: Flemming - das hohe lied (TV series, season 1, episode 5)
- 2009: Flemming - burnt soil (TV series, season 1, Episode 6)
- 2010: The Golgotha Case (TV)
- 2011: Tatort - Grabenkämpfe
- 2024: Where's Wanda? (TV)

== Awards ==
- 1993 federal short film award,
- 1986 award of the German film critics in the category of best experimental film for Lulu
- 1988 award of the German film critics in the category best experimental film
- 2001 Bavarian film awards in the category of up-and-coming Director for Vaya con Dios
