= Petra Kelly =

Co-founder of the Green Party in Germany (1947–1992)

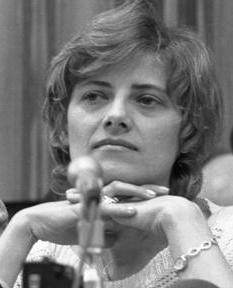
- Kelly in 1983

Leader of The Greens in the Bundestag
- In office 29 March 1983 – 3 April 1984 Serving with Otto Schily and Marieluise Beck
- Chief Whip: Joschka Fischer
- Preceded by: Office established
- Succeeded by: Waltraud Schoppe

Member of the Bundestag for Bavaria
- In office 6 March 1983 – 2 December 1990
- Constituency: The Greens List

Personal details
- Born: Petra Karin Lehmann; 29 November 1947 Günzburg, Bavaria, Germany
- Died: c. 1 October 1992 (aged 44) Bonn, North Rhine-Westphalia, Germany
- Party: The Greens
- Domestic partner: Gert Bastian
- Education: American University, University of Amsterdam
- Occupation: Activist, politician
- Awards: Right Livelihood Award
- Website: petrakellystiftung.de

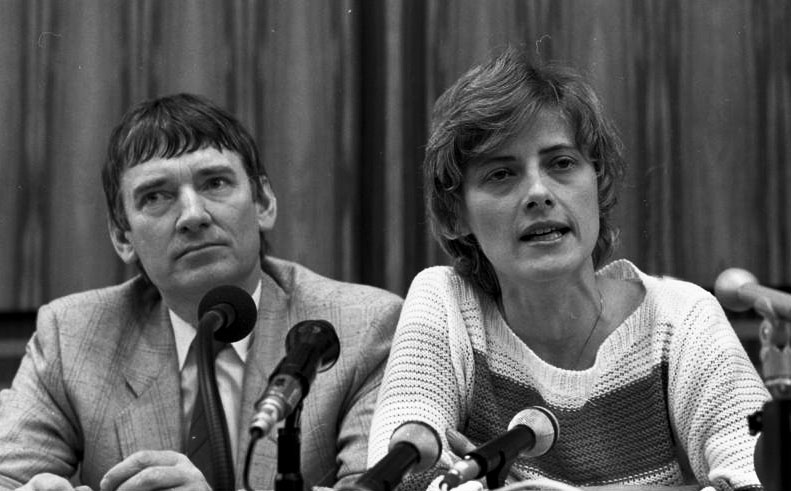
Kelly and Otto Schily after the 1983 West German federal election

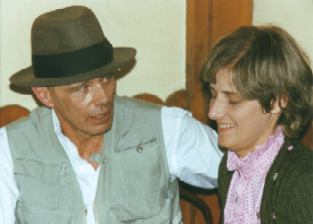
Joseph Beuys with Petra Kelly. Photographed by Rainer Rappmann

Petra Karin Kelly (29 November 1947 – c. 1 October 1992) was a German Green politician and ecofeminist activist. She was a founding member of the German Green Party, the first Green party to rise to prominence both nationally in Germany and worldwide. In 1982, she was awarded the Right Livelihood Award for "forging and implementing a new vision uniting ecological concerns with disarmament, social justice and human rights."

== Early life and education ==
Petra Karin Lehmann was born in Günzburg, Bavaria in 1947. She changed her name to Kelly after her mother married John E. Kelly, a US Army officer. She was educated in a Catholic convent in Günzburg and later attended school in Georgia and Virginia after her family relocated to the United States in 1959. She lived and studied in the United States until her return to West Germany in 1970. She retained her West German citizenship throughout her life.

Kelly admired Martin Luther King Jr., and campaigned for Robert F. Kennedy and Hubert Humphrey in the 1968 U.S. elections. She studied political science at the School of International Service at American University (Washington, D.C.), from which she graduated in 1970 with a bachelor's degree. She also graduated from the European Institute at the University of Amsterdam in 1971 with a master's degree.

== Career ==
While working at the European Commission (Brussels, Belgium, 1971–83), Kelly participated in numerous peace and environmental campaigns in Germany and other countries.

After working for two years at the European Commission, she moved to an administrative post at the Economic and Social Committee, where she championed women's rights.

=== German Green Party ===
Kelly was one of the founders of Die Grünen, the German Green Party in 1979. In 1983 she was elected to the Bundestag via the Electoral list as a Member of the Bundestag representing Bavaria. She was subsequently re-elected in 1987 with a higher share of the vote.

In 1981, Kelly was involved in a protest of 400,000 people in Bonn against nuclear weapons. In 1982, Gerhard Schröder wrote a contribution in Die Zeit for the book Prinzip Leben, edited by Kelly and Jo Leinen, which discussed ecological problems and a possible nuclear war.

In the same year, Kelly received the Right Livelihood Award "...for forging and implementing a new vision uniting ecological concerns with disarmament, social justice, and human rights."

On 12 May 1983, Kelly, Gert Bastian and three other Green Bundestag members unfurled a banner on Alexanderplatz in East Berlin, which said "The Greens – Swords to Ploughshares". After being briefly arrested, they met with East German opposition parties. The East German authorities tolerated this since the West German Greens repudiated the NATO Double-Track Decision. In October 1983, Erich Honecker, the leader of the German Democratic Republic, met Petra Kelly, Gert Bastian and other Greens. Kelly wore a pullover with the words "Swords to Ploughshares" on it. She demanded the release of all prisoners of the East German peace movement and asked Honecker why he repressed something in the GDR which he supported in the West.

Kelly wrote the book Fighting for Hope in 1984, published by South End Press. The book is an urgent call for a world free from violence between North and South, men and women, ourselves and our environment.

In the final years of her life, Kelly became increasingly estranged from most of her party colleagues owing to the pragmatic turn taken by the Greens at the time, while she continued to oppose any alliance with traditional political parties.

== Death ==
On 19 October 1992, the decomposed bodies of Kelly and her partner, ex-general and Green politician Gert Bastian (born 1923), were discovered in the bedroom of her house in Bonn by police officials after they received a call from both Bastian's wife and Kelly's grandmother who reported that they had not heard from either Bastian or Kelly for a few weeks. The police determined that Kelly was shot dead while sleeping by Bastian, who then died of suicide. She was 44, he was 69. The last time anyone heard from the couple was on 30 September 1992 when Kelly sent a parcel to her grandmother. Police estimated the deaths had most likely occurred on 1 October but the exact time of death could not be pinpointed owing to the delay in finding the bodies and their resultant state of decomposition. Kelly was buried in the Waldfriedhof (forest cemetery) in Würzburg, near the village of Heidingsfeld in Lower Franconia, Bavaria.

== Honors ==
- 1982: Right Livelihood Award
- In 2006 Kelly was placed 45th in the UK Environment Agency's all-time list of scientists, campaigners, writers, economists and naturalists who, in its view, have done the most to save the planet. Kelly was positioned between the tropical ecologist Mike Hands and the national parks visionary John Dower.

== Works ==
- Kelly, Petra K. Thinking Green! Essays on Environmentalism, Feminism, and Nonviolence, Parallax Press, Berkeley, California, 1994 (ISBN 0-938077-62-7)
- Kelly, Petra K. Nonviolence Speaks to Power, online book, almost complete text (also, out of print, published by Matsunaga Institute for Peace, University of Hawaii, 1992, ISBN 1-880309-05-X)

== Portrayals ==
- Happiness is a Warm Gun, 2001 film by Thomas Imbach
- Petra, 2020 novel by Shaena Lambert

== See also ==
- List of peace activists
