= My Brother, My Love =

2018 film by Thomas Imbach

- Theatrical release poster
- German: Glaubenberg
- Directed by: Thomas Imbach
- Screenplay by: Thomas Imbach; Arnaud De Cazes
- Story by: Thomas Imbach
- Produced by: Andrea Štaka; Thomas Imbach
- Starring: Zsofia Körös; Francis Meier; Milan Peschel; Bettina Stucky; Morgane Ferru; Nikola Šošic; İlayda Akdoğan; Gonca de Haas; Erol Afşin
- Cinematography: Thomas Imbach
- Edited by: Thomas Imbach
- Music by: Lukas Langenegger
- Production companies: Okofilm Productions; SRF; SRG SSR; Teleclub
- Distributed by: Frenetic Films
- Release dates: 6 August 2018 (Locarno); 22 November 2018 (Switzerland)
- Running time: 114 minutes
- Country: Switzerland
- Language: German

My Brother, My Love (German: Glaubenberg) is a 2018 Swiss drama film directed by Thomas Imbach. The film had its world premiere at the Locarno Film Festival in August 2018. It received the Zurich Film Prize 2018.

== Premise ==
Sixteen-year-old Lena feels more attracted to her brother Noah than is usual among siblings. She tries to distract herself with Noah's friend Enis, but the impossible love becomes an obsession. She loses herself in daydreams and soon lives more in her imagination than in the real world. Finally she struggles to confess her love to her brother. However, the brother, frightened, rejects her. For Lena, a journey into the unknown begins.

== Cast ==
- Zsofia Körös as Lena
- Francis Meier as Noah
- Milan Peschel as father
- Bettina Stucky as mother
- Morgane Ferru as Julia
- Nikola Šošic as Enis
- İlayda Akdoğan as Meriem
- Gonca de Haas as Ebru
- Erol Afşin as Mustafa

== Background ==
My Brother, My Love is inspired by Imbach's biography, albeit strongly fictionalized. It is about a love that is filled with taboos in our society, about the sister's longing for her brother, which can only be lived as a delusion. In the film, Imbach focuses on the time of adolescence, when this passion first seeks fulfilment and has a thoroughly "healthy" origin.

== Reception ==
Björn Hayer of the Neue Zürcher Zeitung wrote: "The boundaries between reality and wishful thinking are blurred in a sophisticated narrative structure, visually congenially implemented – Lena's perspective and her thoughts alone carry this extraordinary work".

Kino-Zeit stated: "A remarkably fearless film, a highlight in Locarno 2018".
