= Happiness is a Warm Gun (film) =

2001 film by Thomas Imbach

Happiness Is a Warm Gun
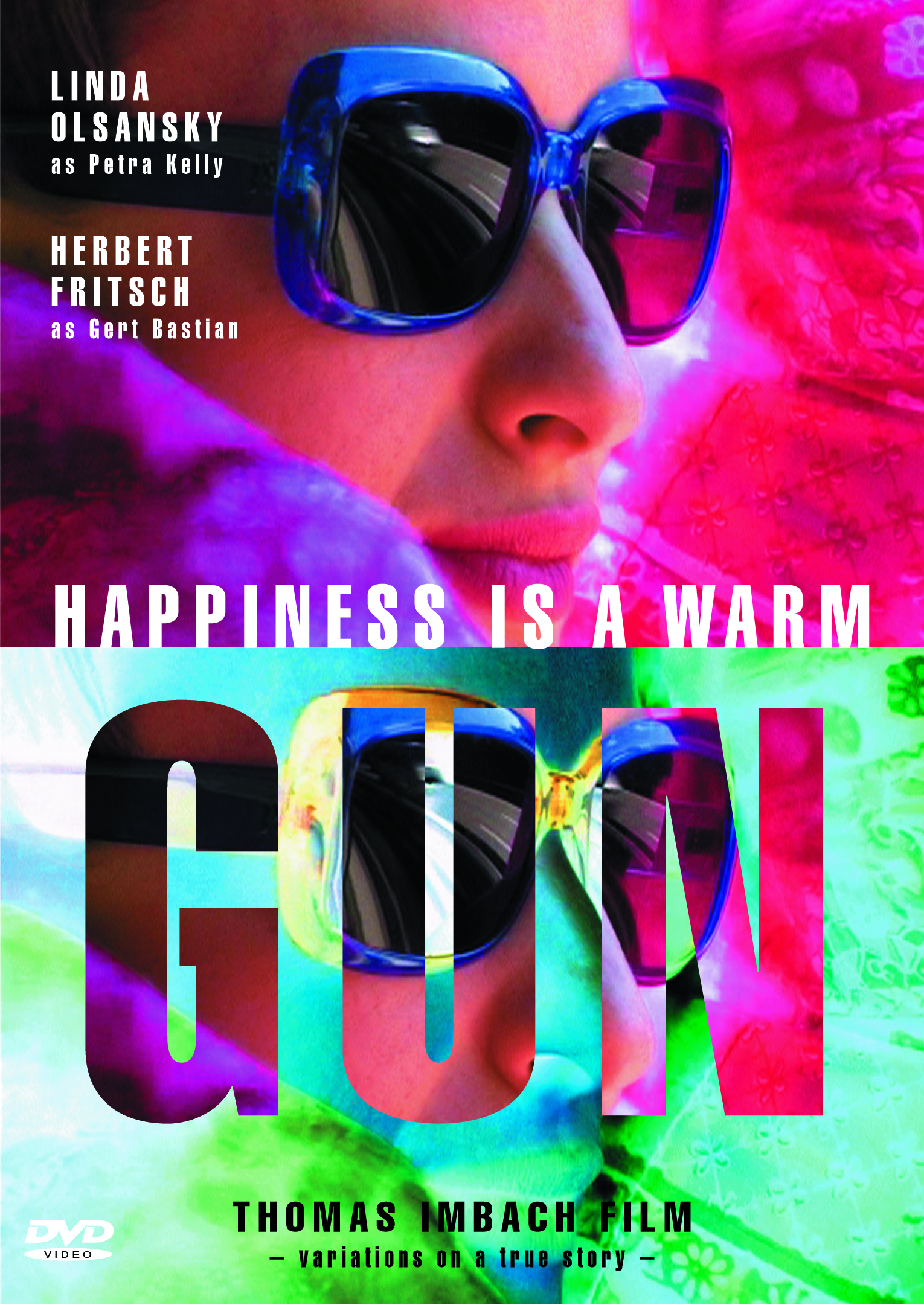
- Directed by: Thomas Imbach
- Screenplay by: Thomas Imbach; Jürg Hassler; Peter Purtschert
- Produced by: Bachim Film; Thomas Imbach
- Cinematography: Jürg Hassler; Thomas Imbach
- Edited by: Jürg Hassler; Thomas Imbach
- Music by: Sir Henry
- Release date: 2002
- Running time: 92 minutes
- Countries: Switzerland, Germany
- Language: German

Happiness Is a Warm Gun is a 2001 feature film by the Swiss director Thomas Imbach, who stages the life and death story of the lovers Petra Kelly and Gert Bastian. Between documentary-like scenes and fictional acting, as well as archive material, the narrative of a love story is created, rolled up from its end. Happiness Is a Warm Gun premiered at the International Locarno Film Festival in August 2001. The film won the Zurich Film Prize 2001 and was nominated for the Swiss Film Prize for best feature film and best leading actress.

== Plot ==
Happiness Is a Warm Gun is about the murder of the green pacifist Petra Kelly, who is shot in her sleep by her life partner Gert Bastian, ex-Bundeswehr-General, before he kills himself. The film begins where the lives of the real characters end. Petra and Gert find themselves in the transit area of a modern airport and settle down in this artificial in-between world, trying to pick up the thread of the past - their political activity - while in their conversations what happened is fragmentary.

== Cast ==
- Linda Olsansky: Petra
- Herbert Fritsch: Gert

== Background ==
"After leaving the Bundestag, Kelly lived with her partner Gert Bastian in seclusion in their house in the Tannenbusch district of Bonn. She was seriously ill and suffered from fear of threats (after having received threatening letters). She was on the police's list of endangered personalities, but refused personal protection. According to the police report, Kelly was killed in her sleep by Bastian with his Deringer-type pistol under circumstances that are not completely clear, and Bastian is said to have put an end to his life afterwards, whereby according to a report in Der Spiegel magazine, the gun was aimed from above at a spot just above the forehead. The bodies were found on October 19, 1992 - several weeks after the crime. The exact date could therefore no longer be determined with certainty; the time of death is assumed to be the night of October 1, 1992."

== Reception ==
"’The bullet‘, says the Petra Kelly figure in this film, ’manages with one intensely warm sensation to dislodge everything in a single moment. It makes its home inside me – that must have been the moment I briefly lifted off.‘ Likewise, the images of Thomas Imbach‘s film seem to thrust aside everything you thought you knew about this historic and mythical couple. The film observes death from the inside. In this long moment of death, the I starts to wonder. Not about death, but about the inability to live. Not about futility, but about the fact that all these exhausting efforts have not brought the world and this I one inch closer to one another. In these sequences, too, as in the documentary episodes and the fragmentary reminiscences, Happiness Is A Warm Gun is as radically political as it is radically physical."

"Imbach’s film is essentially an interpretation, a variation on a true story, as he himself says in the introduction, and thus a vehicle conveying a specific view. He is not afraid to show the ugly side of his subject, but it is something else that is important. His film is also a declaration of love: the two protagonists, especially Petra, are wonderful. In his typically detailed shots, which draw attention to things that are normally taken so much for granted that they go unnoticed, he marvels at Petra’s lips, the hollow at the bottom of her neck, her gentleness as she carefully and silently washes the exhausted Gert who stands naked before her."

"Imbach has staged a version of the tragedy that shows the human-all-too-human extras behind the main actors on the political stage."

"In 'Happiness Is a Warm Gun', the Swiss artist experiments with unreal leaps in time between past and future, between this world and the next, as we know it from the thrillers of David Lynch. A captivating, intense chamber play with unusual perspectives, which hopefully will find a distributor."

"In a brilliant montage, Imbach extends the lives of Kelly and Bastian to the present day, virtually bombarding his audience with images and sounds... Cinema in the best sense of the word, which teaches you to see and hear."

"Their unconditional and at the same time constantly reflected play creates a new, unique dimension of reality for the film - fragmentation and reconstruction reconciling, as it were. But it is also astonishing how Thomas Imbach, in this, his first actual directorial work with actors, understood how to bring his actors to "controlled identification", according to the theses he formulated: "Tell your actor who he is, but not what he should do", and "Every emotional movement of the actor is that of the character. There are no breaks in shooting" Bold words, indeed."
