= Lenz (2006 film) =

2006 Swiss feature film

- Directed by: Thomas Imbach
- Screenplay by: Thomas Imbach
- Produced by: Thomas Imbach
- Starring: Milan Peschel: Lenz; Barbara Maurer: Natalie; Noah Gsell: Noah; Barbara Heynen: Tanja
- Cinematography: Jürg Hassler, Thomas Imbach
- Edited by: Thomas Imbach, Jürg Hassler, Patrizia Stotz
- Music by: Peter Bräker, Balz Bachmann
- Release date: 2006
- Running time: 96 minutes
- Countries: Switzerland, Germany
- Languages: German, Swiss German

Lenz is a 2006 Swiss feature film directed by Thomas Imbach, based on the narrative fragment Lenz by Georg Büchner. In the film, the character of Lenz, played by Milan Peschel, is a filmmaker facing a personal and artistic crisis. Lenz was screened at the Berlin International Film Festival 2006 in the "Forum" section. It was also shown at festivals such as the Melbourne International Film Festival, the Vancouver International Film Festival and the Bafici in Buenos Aires.

== Plot ==
The eccentric Lenz is in a life crisis. He leaves his home Berlin in order to explore Georg Büchner's fragment "Lenz" in the Vogesen. Soon, however, he travels to Zermatt in the Swiss Alps to see his nine-year-old son Noah. With his help, he organises a meeting with his ex-wife Natalie, whom he still loves. However, the illusion of family life is short-lived due to Lenz's strange behaviour. Noah and Natalie return to Zurich, and Lenz remains alone in the mountains.

== Reception ==
The Berner Zeitung said that Imbach tells "the story of a driven explorer of life, a love story without a way out, the tender picture of a father-son relationship" and sheds light on "the absurdities of the fashionable tourist resort" of Zermatt. In doing so, he puts the Matterhorn "in a new light" and makes it "a main character" that tells "about nature and the difficult nature of man". In addition, Imbach succeeds in making "one of the most sensual 'Heimatfilme' for a long time."

The Filmdienst, on the other hand, judged that "[d]espite the subject matter", "the direction and the exalted acting of the lead actor do not allow for intimacy", but "keep the viewer at a distance". This is also helped by "numerous breaks in the staging", which are "at the same time to be understood as ironic sideswipes at the excesses of mass tourism in Switzerland".
