= I Was a Swiss Banker =

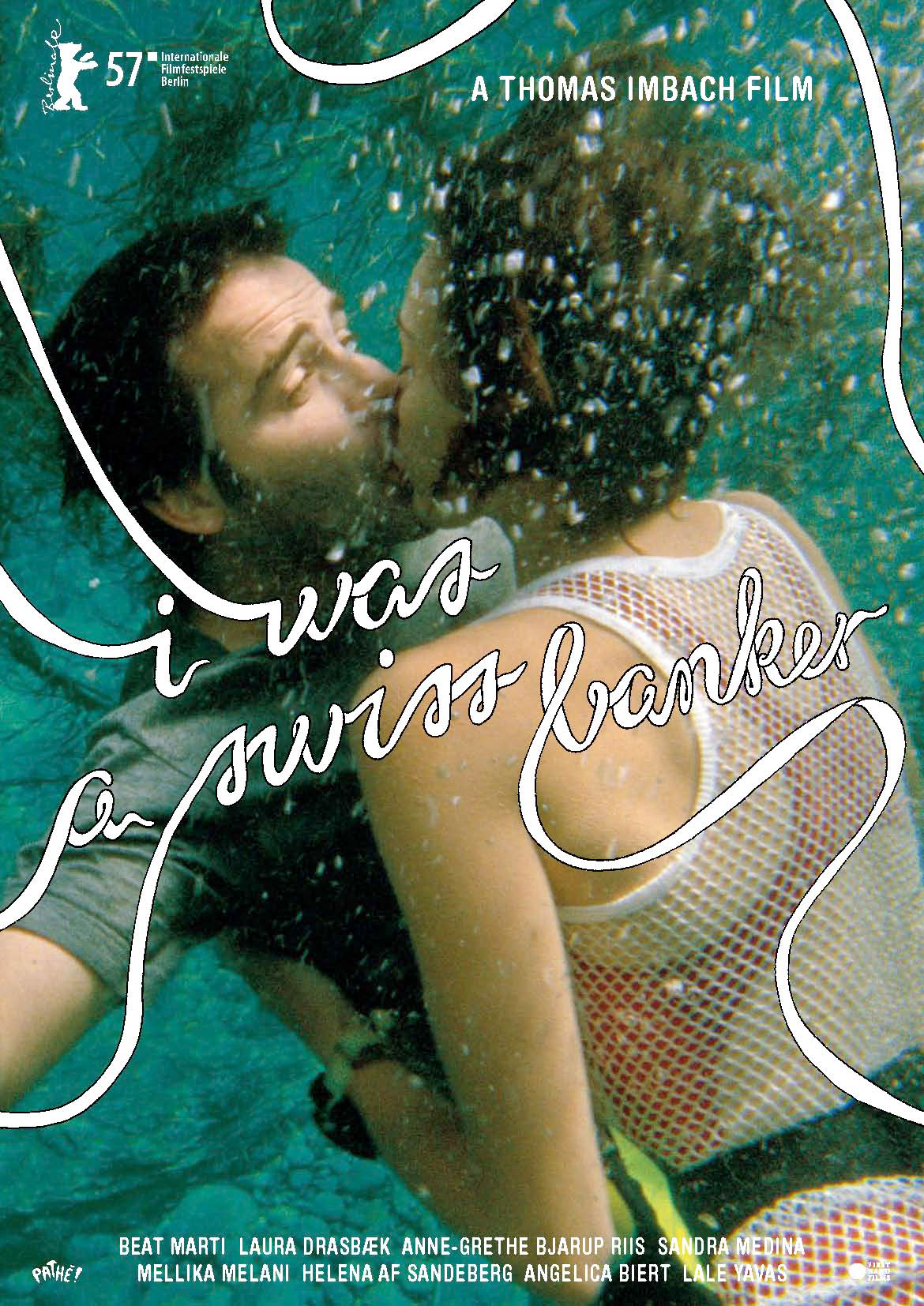
- Directed by: Thomas Imbach
- Screenplay by: Thomas Imbach; Eva Kammerer; Jürg Hassler
- Produced by: Bachim Film, Thomas Imbach
- Starring: Beat Marti
- Cinematography: Jürg Hassler; Thomas Imbach
- Music by: Balz Bachmann; Peter Bräker
- Release date: February 12, 2007
- Running time: 75 minutes
- Country: Switzerland
- Languages: Swiss German; German; English; Danish; Swedish; Grisons Romansh; Turkish; Italian; French

I Was a Swiss Banker is a 2007 fantasy film directed by Thomas Imbach, from a screenplay by Imbach, Eva Kammerer and Jürg Hassler, and starring Beat Marti. The film premiered on 12 February 2007 during the Berlin International Film Festival.

== Plot ==
The successful young Swiss banker Roger Caviezel has been smuggling the black money of his German customers across the border for some time. When he is stopped in his vehicle at a border control, he flees into Lake Constance with his wallet - as the police are chasing him. This lake, however, is populated by mystical beings. The banker bets with a witch that he can find his true love in a maximum of three attempts. When his flirtations with a shepherdess, a blonde seductress and a waitress fail and he realizes that he cannot free himself from the clutches of the pushy witch, he visits his canton Graubünden home. There he falls in love with a Turkish employee on his grandmother's farm, which also does not last long. After he was able to parachute to safety from the witch, he is enchanted by another companion, the mermaid in Lara Croft outfit. She becomes his mistress Patricia, with whom Roger finds his new happiness as a lido operator on Lake Geneva.

== Cast ==
- Beat Marti as Roger Caviezel
- Laura Drasbæk as Patricia, a mermaid
- Anne-Grethe Bjarup Riis as Heli, a witch
- Sandra Medina as Laura
- Helena af Sandeberg as Helena
- Mellika Melani as Zahar
- Angelica Biert as Grandmother
- Lale Yavaş as Banu

== Background ==
The fairy tale plot is based on The Little Mermaid by Hans Christian Andersen, and the female main characters are played by Scandinavian actresses.

== Reception ==
Lexikon of International Film described the film positively, writing: "A playful, fairy-tale search for federal identity, developed in refreshingly sensual images, which in a variety of ways sings the praises of equal coexistence."

René Müller of Filmbulletin wrote: "I Was a Swiss Banker is characterized by a curious mix of genres. A fairy tale that begins like a crime thriller and develops into a frivolous travel and local history film with an international touch.“

Lukas Foerster of Dirty Laundry wrote: "I Was a Swiss Banker is also the best film about Switzerland that I have ever seen. ...Roger is from the very beginning beyond psychologization and family history and serves merely as an always well-coiffed free-floating object, which on the one hand can be claimed by erotic and other accesses and on the other hand can serve as a picture and narration machinery, which is able to produce a postcard panorama and an abstruse subplot one after the other.“
