= Nano-Babies =

Nano Babies
- Directed by: Thomas Imbach, Jürg Hassler
- Screenplay by: Thomas Imbach, Monika Gsell
- Produced by: Bachim Film
- Cinematography: Jürg Hassler, Thomas Imbach
- Edited by: Thomas Imbach, Jürg Hassler
- Music by: Peter Bräker
- Release date: 1998
- Running time: 50 minutes
- Country: Switzerland
- Language: Swiss German

Nano Babies is a science fiction essay film by Swiss director Thomas Imbach, which he realised in 1998 together with Jürg Hassler. Nano Babies follows everyday life in a crèche at a technical university. Two future-creating worlds - the worlds of the children and their parents - collide. Nano Babies was produced for Swiss television.

== Plot ==
In the 50-minute film, small children are shown in a day nursery: As in Thomas Imbach's previous film Ghetto, fragments of the children's everyday lives, captured in rich detail, alternate with a variety of (cold, forbidding) exterior views and artful sounds (the day nursery is part of a university and the building also houses the laboratories and offices of the parents, mostly high-tech scientists).

== Background ==
Imbach and his cinematographer Jürg Hassler call their film, shot in Cinemascope, a "science fiction essay", which, in a thoroughly ironic way, pretty much sums up the cinematic argument of Nano Babies.
