= Die Bergretter =

German mountain rescue television series

- Also known as: Die Bergretter
- Opening theme: Foot of the mountain by A-ha
- Country of origin: Germany
- No. of seasons: 16
- No. of episodes: 100

Production
- Producer: Neue Deutsche Filmgesellschaft
- Running time: 45–90 minutes

Die Bergwacht (since 2012 Die Bergretter) (English: The Mountain Rescuers) is a German mountain rescue television series, broadcast since 26 November 2009 on ZDF. The series is set in the Austrian Alps and centers around a fictional Bergwacht (mountain rescue) team in Ramsau am Dachstein. Each episode focuses on a rescue mission, explores the background stories of the people involved the incident (more often than not caused by their risky behaviour) and the private lives of the team members.

== Setting ==
Andreas Marthaler is about to open a climbing school in the USA together with his girlfriend. Before emigrating he attends the wedding of his best friend and leader of the mountain rescue Stefan Hofer. When Stefan Hofer is killed in a mountaineering accident on the day after the wedding while on a tour with Andreas Marthaler, Andreas tries to care for Stefan's wife Emilie Hofer and the two children just as his friend asked him to. This is not easy for Emilie, Andreas and his girlfriend. Additionally Andreas Marthaler becomes the leader of the mountain rescue service in Ramsau which comes with its own challenges.

At the end of the sixth series Andreas Marthaler tragically falls to his death while saving a little girl. According to his wishes Markus Kofler becomes the new leader of the team. Markus finds this difficult at first as he was with Andreas when he died.

== Characters ==
=== Team members ===
Markus Kofler (played by Sebastian Ströbel) is the leader of the team. He is affected by the tragic death of Andreas Marthaler, not made easier by the initial reactions of the rest of the team to which he responds defensively. He has inherited a dilapidated farm from his father and receives an invitation to stay at Emilie Hofer's until he has renovated it. He has an affair at the start of series seven with his former girlfriend whom he gave up when was misdiagnosed as paraplegic. Markus Kofler is an excellent mountaineer, enjoys risky stunts and says of himself that he is not a team player and likes old-fashioned things.

Tobias Herbrechter (played by Markus Brandl) has been a member of the mountain rescue team for many years and was its leader for a short period. He is a good mountaineer but not as good as Andreas and does not warm up to him initially. Tobias is courageous and caring but can be hot tempered. The rivals become fast friends however. Conflicts arise at times with his father, local hotelier and mayor Peter Herbrechter. Tobias falls in love with, and in series seven marries, Emilie Hofer. After the death of his friend Andreas Marthaler he is devastated and cannot accept Markus Kofler as a member of the mountain rescue team. As with Andreas - and Katharina Strasser - their friendship grows over time and Markus Kofler even ends up being the best man at his wedding.

Michael Dörfler (played by Robert Lohr), usually called Michi, is the helicopter pilot. He is straightforward, keeps a cool head even in the worst of situations and has a dry sense of humour. He knows that there are limits to what courage and goodwill can achieve and sometimes needs to check his team members who know they can trust him. After an affair with Bea Kleinert he starts a relationship with Dr. Verena Auerbach in series seven. When Markus Kofler joins the team he accepts him even though the others are reticent.

Katharina Strasser (played by Luise Bähr) joins the team in series six as paramedic and is Tobias' half-sister. She also works as a physiotherapist in the hotel owned by her father Peter Herbrechter. She is dedicated and assertive and has a close relationship to Emilie Hofer and is a bridesmaid at her wedding. She was in a relationship with Andreas Marthaler and had plans to go with him on his trip around the world. After his death and due to its circumstances she cannot accept the newcomer Markus Kofler easily. Her reservedness lasts throughout series seven.

Rudi (played by Michael Pascher) is a repairman at the heliport Christophorus 14. After Ben leaves the team in series 9 he joins the main team.

=== Previous members ===
Andreas Marthaler (played by Martin Gruber) is the leader of the mountain rescue team of Ramsau am Dachstein. He is an expert mountaineer and wanted to open a climbing school in the USA until the death of his friend Stefan Hofer. After that he cares for Stefan's wife Emilie and her children and their farm, which creates problems with his girlfriend Sarah (played by Stephanie Stumph) who wanted to emigrate with him to the USA. Andreas also becomes leader of the local mountain rescue team and brings all his heart and expertise to this job. He and his girlfriend eventually separate but in series three they rekindle the relationship and want to marry. Sarah, however, dies from injuries sustained in an avalanche. In series six Andreas wants to give up mountaineering - apart from being a member of the mountain rescue team he up until then wanted to climb the K2 - and go on a world trip. On his last mission he gets to know Markus Kofler whom he appreciates as a mountaineer and who has applied for a job as a mountain rescuer in Ramsau. Later he decides to cut the rope that is holding him and a little girl, so that Markus Kofler can pull her up.

Toni Stössel (played by Stefan Zinner (series 1) and Martin Klempnow (series 2–7) ) is owner of a sports shop in Ramsau, right next to the mountain rescue office. He is good-natured and a mountain rescuer through and through but flights in the helicopter do not agree with him. Thus he mostly stays in the office and takes care of the technical and logistic aspects of the situation. At the beginning of series seven he gets to know a young woman on a rescue mission and later decides to leave Ramsau with her.

Benjamin Marasek (played by Mirko Lang), usually called Ben, joins the team in series seven. When Toni Stössl moves away with his new girlfriend, Ben takes over his sports shop and after his first involuntary rescue mission becomes a member of the mountain rescue team. He is open minded, technically adept and usually holds the fort in the mountain rescue office which is situated next to his shop. He tends to be tight-lipped about personal matters which nearly leads to his losing his shop.

=== Other recurring characters ===
Emilie Hofer (played by Stefanie von Poser) is a friend of the whole team and especially Tobias Herbrechter whom she marries in series seven. She has three children and a farm which she manages with the help of Andreas Marthaler after the death of her first husband Stefan Hofer. Later she takes in Andreas' father Franz Marthaler and transforms the farm into a pension and in series seven invites Markus Kofler to stay as well even though her husband Tobias is still at loggerheads with him. She is strong, independent, cares deeply for her family and friends and lives in constant fear for them, especially her husband.

Franz Marthaler (played by Heinz Marecek) is Andreas Marthaler's slightly quirky father and knows the dangers of the job first-hand because he was a mountain rescuer himself in his youth, together with Peter Herbrechter. After the small hotel he had run with his sister burned down Emilie Hofer takes him in. He was glad that his son would leave the mountain rescue team alive and well and is devastated by his death, especially because his wife also died in the mountains and is at first shocked to see that Emilie has invited Markus Kofler to stay as well. His quarrels with Peter Herbrechter often serve as comic relief.

Peter Herbrechter (played by Michael König) is Tobias Herbrechter's and Katharina Strasser's father, hotelier and mayor. He can be as jovial as he can be quarrelsome. Conflicts with Franz Marthaler are the rule, the one always trying to outwit or outperform the other but they are joint in their care for their loved ones. Peter Herbrechter alone pronounces Emilie's name as "Emili-e" instead of "Emily".

Dr. Verena Auerbach (played by Gundula Niemeyer) is a doctor in the nearby hospital. She knows the team well, having to patch them up regularly. She also tried being the paramedic on the team but could not continue due to her fear of heights.

== Production ==
The name was changed from "Die Bergwacht" (roughly: "mountain watch"), which is the name of the German mountain rescue, to "Die Bergretter" (literally: "the mountain rescuers"). In Austria the organisation is called "Bergrettungsdienst" (literally: "mountain rescue service"), as seen on the logos on the team's jackets.

The first episodes were 45 minutes long, since 2012 they are feature-length.

Between series three and four a special was broadcast, a crossover production featuring Die Bergretter as well as Der Bergdoktor.

Filming for the eighth series began in February 2016.

== See also ==
- Sauvetage
