= Day Is Done (film) =

- Film poster
- Directed by: Thomas Imbach
- Produced by: Andrea Staka; Thomas Imbach
- Cinematography: Thomas Imbach
- Edited by: Gion-Reto Killias; Tom La Belle
- Release date: February 2011 (Berlin)
- Country: Switzerland
- Languages: German; Swissgerman

Day Is Done is an autobiographical fiction film by Swiss director Thomas Imbach. The film was first shown at the Berlin International Film Festival in 2011. Day is Done combines answering machine messages with the view out of Imbach's studio over a period of 15 years. Day is Done toured several international festivals throughout 2011, including Planete + Doc Film Warsaw in May 2011, the Jerusalem Film Festival in July 2011, the Melbourne International Film Festival, the Japanese Yamagata International Documentary Film Festival, and the Chicago International Film Festival in October 2011.

The film won the Zurich Film Award 2011 and the 2012 Swiss Film Award "Quartz" for Best Music as well as the "Honorable Mention" of the "Millenium Award Jury" of the Planete+Doc Festival.

== Plot ==
The film tells the story of a middle-aged Swiss man named Rolf who returns to his hometown after a long absence to attend his father's funeral. As he reconnects with his past and tries to come to terms with his father's death, Rolf is forced to confront unresolved issues from his childhood and grapple with the challenges of growing older.

== Reception ==
Swiss filmmaker Thomas Imbach is noted for his exploration of themes ranging from toxic masculinity to introspection. His film "Day is Done" (2011) is regarded as significant in his career. "Measured against his entire body of work, Day Is Done may be Imbach's premier achievement as an auteur." - SWI swissinfo.ch
