= Klassentreffen 1.0 =

2018 German comedy film

- Theatrical release poster
- Directed by: Til Schweiger
- Written by: Lo Malinke; Til Schweiger
- Produced by: Til Schweiger; Christian Specht
- Starring: Til Schweiger; Milan Peschel; Samuel Finzi; Lilli Schweiger
- Cinematography: Adrian Cranage
- Edited by: Til Schweiger; Robert Kummer
- Music by: Martin Todsharow
- Production companies: Barefoot Films; Warner Bros. Film Productions Germany; Nordisk Film; SevenPictures Film
- Distributed by: Warner Bros. Pictures
- Release date: 20 September 2018
- Running time: 127 minutes
- Country: Germany
- Language: German
- Box office: $10.1 million

Klassentreffen 1.0 - Die unglaubliche Reise der Silberrücken is a 2018 German comedy film written, directed, edited and starring Til Schweiger. It is a remake of the 2011 Danish film The Reunion.

The film was released in Germany on 20 September 2018 by Warner Bros. Pictures. A sequel, The Wedding, was released in 2020.

== Cast ==
- Samuel Finzi as Nils
- Milan Peschel as Andreas
- Til Schweiger as Thomas
- Lilli Schweiger as Lili
- Katharina Schüttler as Jette
- Stefanie Stappenbeck as Linda
- Jeanette Hain as Tanja
- Maximilian Befort as Konstantin
- Eva Luca Klemmt as Sanne
- Martin Baden as Hotelmanager
- Timur Bartels as Lenny
- Simon Schwarz as Ole
- Ilka Bessin as Hausmeisterin
- Marie Burchard as Simone
- Tara Fischer as Lisa
- Henrieke Fritz as Marie
