= Say God Bye =

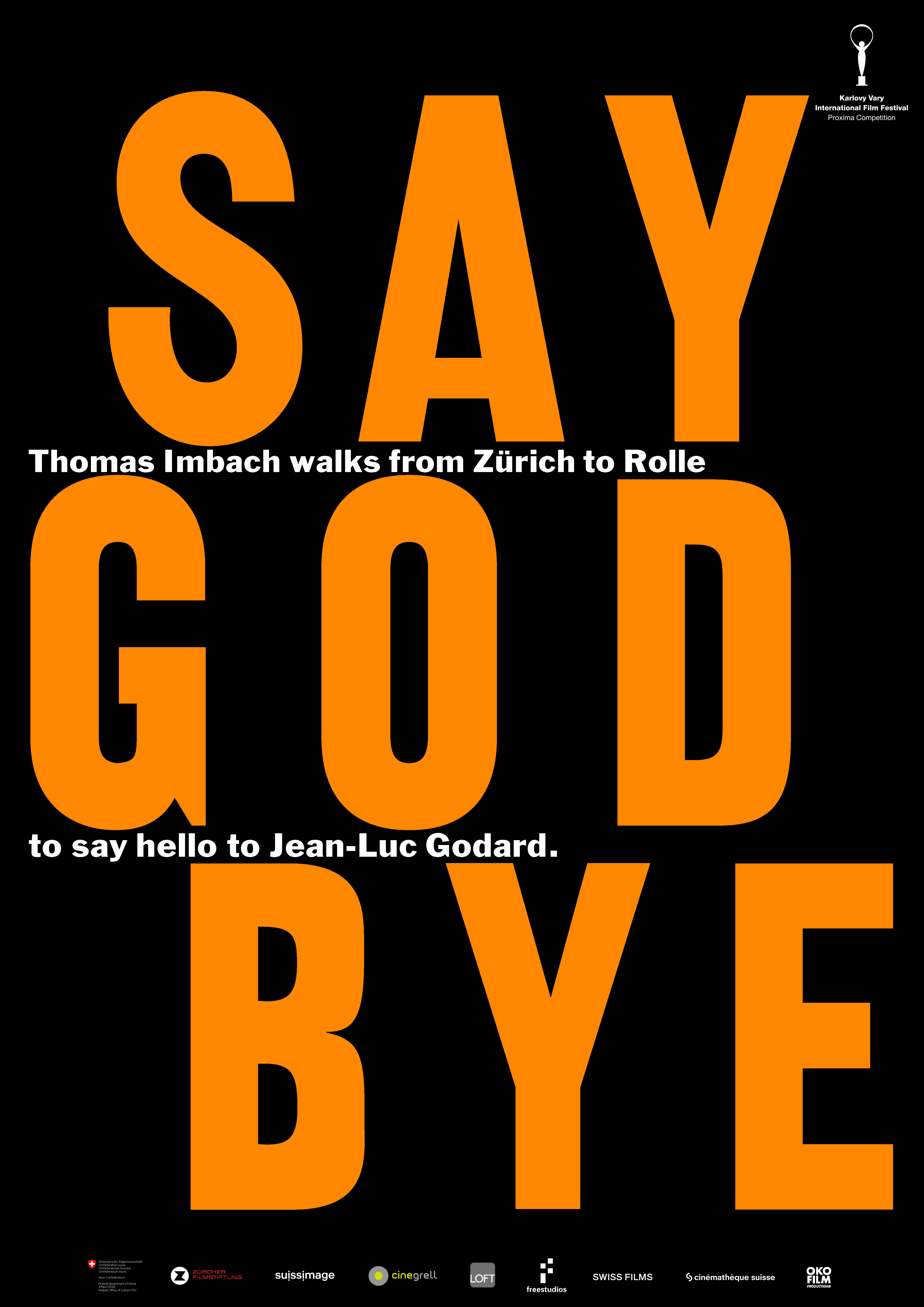
- Movie poster
- Directed by: Thomas Imbach
- Produced by: Thomas Imbach, Andrea Štaka
- Starring: Jean-Luc Godard, Thomas Imbach and David Charap
- Cinematography: Thomas Imbach, David Charap
- Edited by: Thomas Imbach, David Charap
- Music by: Lukas Langenegger
- Production company: Okofilm Productions
- Release date: June 2023
- Running time: 124 minutes
- Country: Switzerland
- Languages: German, English

Say God Bye is a Swiss documentary film by Thomas Imbach from 2023. It premiered in June 2023 as part of the Proxima Competition at the Karlovy Vary International Film Festival. The Latin American premiere took place as part of the Black Canvas Contemporary Film Festival in Mexico City. In April 2024, the film was also shown at the International Documentary Film Festival Sao Paulo.

== Background ==
Karel Och: "'JLG is like the sun; if you get too close to it, you'll get burnt. But if you ignore it, you'll miss out on the light.' Renowned Swiss director Thomas Imbach on the 'god of cinema' who has captivated him as a person and a filmmaker throughout his life. When he happened upon images of the ageing grandmaster, he was inspired to embark on a pilgrimage by foot from the lakes of Zurich to Geneva to pay homage to Godard and, at the same time, convince him to film with him. A witty and playful diary, shot on iPhone and 35mm during the trip, in which Imbach the faithful pilgrim looks back over his own career and engages in dialogue with his fascinating role model. A road movie that is literally conceived 'on its own two feet' as a Godardian master class – about how cinema perceives the world and much more."

=== Reception ===
Patrick Holzapfel: "The pilgrimage to Godard, which for Imbach also means a journey into his own forty years of filmmaking, opens up a space for thought in which the filmmaker has to assert himself against his role model. Time and again, the experiences along the way recall scenes from Godard's films. Trains from today and yesterday meet, the corridors of the Cinémathèque suisse are reminiscent of the Louvre escapes that Godard filmed."

Martin Kudlac: "Imbach creates a hybrid genre – a gonzo meta-documentary – that combines different documentary styles."
