= Traugott Buhre =

German actor (1929–2009)

- Born: 21 June 1929; Insterburg, East Prussia, Weimar Germany
- Died: 26 July 2009 (aged 80); Dortmund, Germany
- Occupation: Actor

Traugott Buhre (21 June 1929 – 26 July 2009) was a German actor.

Buhre was born at Insterburg, East Prussia, Germany (today Chernyakhovsk, Russia) the son of a Lutheran Pastor. His parents divorced in his childhood and after World War II he started his actor's education at the stage school of Hanover.

Buhre appeared at the Frankonian Theater of Wetzhausen. He was a member of the ensembles of the Badisches Staatstheater Karlsruhe, the Staatstheater Stuttgart, the Schauspielhaus Bochum, Thalia-Theater Hamburg, Deutsches Schauspielhaus Hamburg, the Schaubühne in Berlin, Burgtheater in Vienna and the Berliner Ensemble.

His last stage appearance was in Thomas Bernhard's Immanuel Kant at the Schauspielhaus Zürich in 2009.

Buhre was popular among a wider audience for his TV roles in Derrick and Tatort and in the German movie production Anatomy.

Buhre was married twice and had seven children.

== Filmography ==
Year	Title	Role	Notes
1973	Part-Time Work of a Domestic Slave	Dr. med. Ernst Genée	
1975	The Unguarded House	Leo	TV film
1975-1995	Derrick	Werner Hauser / Anton Fischer / Vater Fiska / Herr Ludenke / Albert Kolpe / Steinbrink / Korschow	TV series, 7 episodes
1983	Alles unter Kontrolle. Notizen auf dem Weg zum Überwachungsstaat		
1984	What's Up, Chancellor?		
1990	Winckelmann's Travels	Vater Maas	
1993	Just a Matter of Duty	Direktor der Dresdner Bank	
1996	Der Trip		
1996	Peanuts – The Bank Pays Everything	Dr. Dieter Brinkhoff	
1997	Gone Wrong	Vater Harm	
1999	Alles Bob!	Großvater	
1999	After the Truth	Dabrowski	
2000	Anatomy	Prof. Grombek	
2001	Sass	Zörgiebel	
2002	Vaya con Dios	Abt Stefan	
2002	Sophiiiie!	Alter Mann	
