= Countdown – Die Jagd beginnt =

German television series

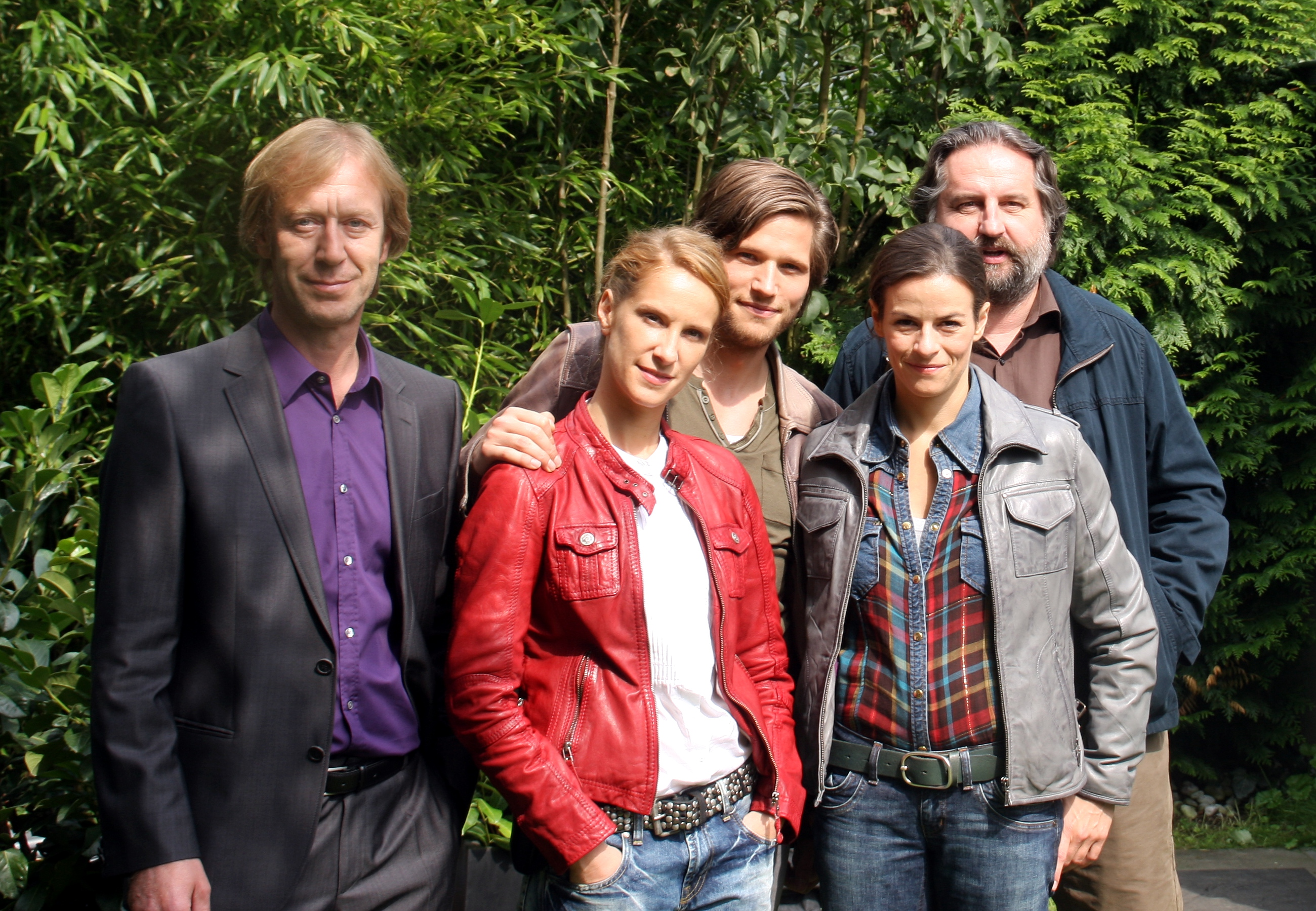
- Oliver Stritzel, Chiara Schoras, Sebastian Ströbel, Anne Diemer, Andreas Windhuis
- Country of origin: Germany

Original release
- Network: RTL
- Release: 2009 – 2011

Countdown – Die Jagd beginnt ("Countdown – The Chase Begins") is a German television series. It is a remake of the Spanish television series Cuenta atrás. It aired on RTL from 2009 to 2011.

== See also ==
- List of German television series
