= Cuenta atrás =

Spanish television series

- Genre: Thriller; Action; Police drama
- Starring: Dani Martín; Bárbara Lennie; Álex González; Teresa Hurtado de Ory; José Ángel Egido
- Country of origin: Spain
- Original language: Spanish
- No. of seasons: 2
- No. of episodes: 29

Production
- Running time: 50 min (approx.)
- Production company: Globomedia

Original release
- Network: Cuatro
- Release: 8 May 2007 – 1 May 2008

Cuenta atrás is a Spanish police thriller television series produced by Globomedia for Cuatro starring Dani Martín, Bárbara Lennie, Álex González, Teresa Hurtado de Ory and José Ángel Egido. It aired from 2007 to 2008.

== Premise ==
The fiction focuses on the activities of a judicial police unit led by Corso (Dani Martín), which has to face extreme situations. A distinctive feature of the series is that the episodes opened with the initial part of the climax, reconstructing over the course of the episode how the fiction had come to that point.

== Cast ==
- Dani Martín as Pablo Ruiz Corso, "Corso".
- Bárbara Lennie as Leonor Marín, "Leo".
- Álex González as Mario Arteta.
- Teresa Hurtado de Ory as Rocío Oleguer.
- José Ángel Egido as Juan Molina.

== Production and release ==
The series was the first Globomedia production for Sogecable's channel Cuatro. It also entailed Bárbara Lennie's television debut. The first season consisted of 13 episodes with a running time of roughly 50 minutes. The first episode premiered on 8 May 2007. Filming of season 2 included shooting in Miami and the Mediterranean coast in Alicante. The 16-episode second season began airing on 10 January 2008. The broadcasting run was irregular, with the TV channel rescheduling back and forth the broadcast on different week days and time slots. The broadcasting of the last episode, "Desguace Jiménez, 18:10 horas", was scheduled for the late night slot (23:40) of 1 May 2008.

The series was remade in Germany under the title Countdown: Die Jagd beginnt (RTL; 2009–2011).

Series	Episodes	Originally released	
Series	Episodes	First released	Last released
1	13	8 May 2007	22 July 2007
2	16	10 January 2008	1 May 2008
