= Chiara Schoras =

German actress

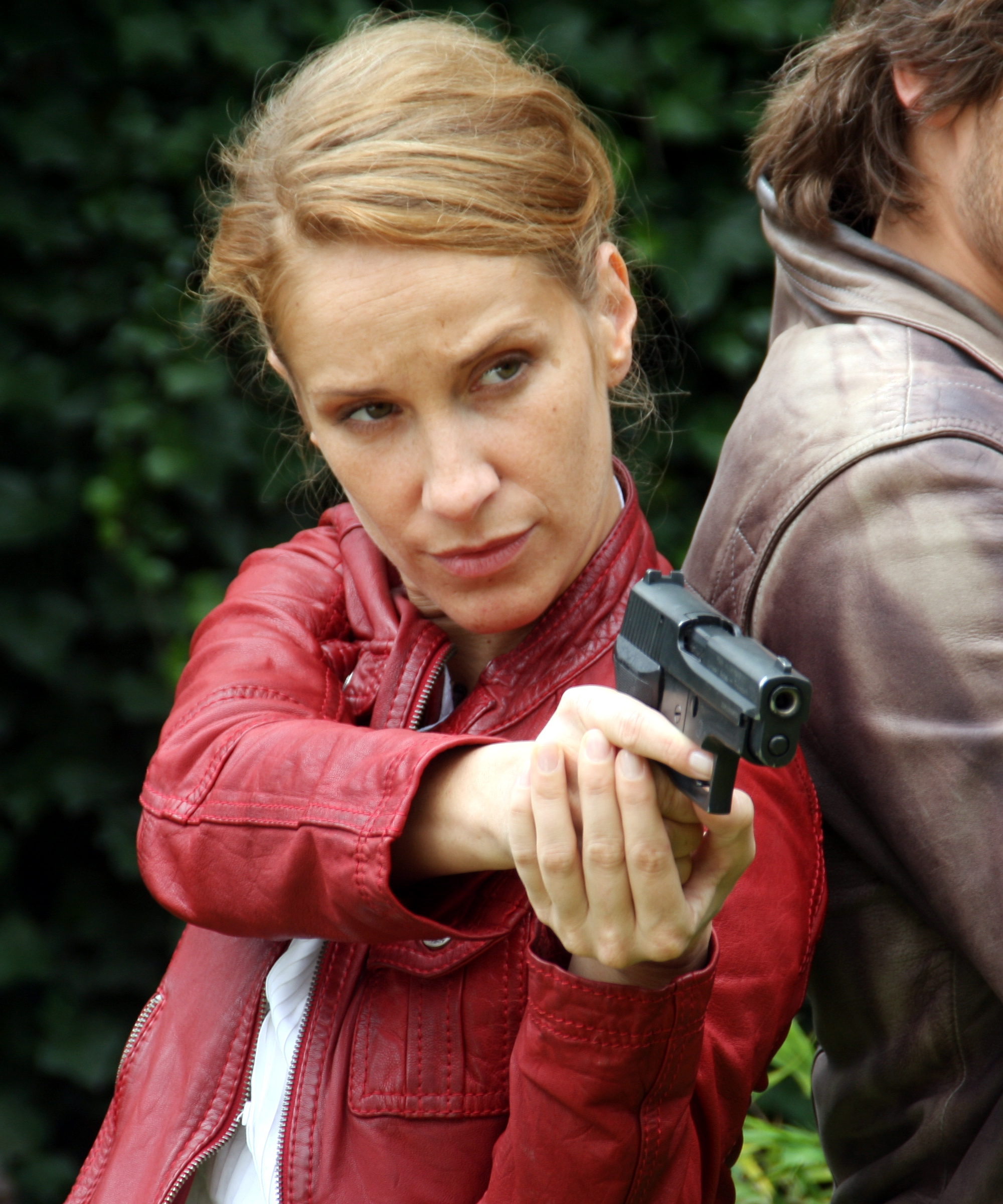
Chiara Schoras in Countdown

Chiara Schoras (born 26 September 1975, in Elmshorn) is a German actress.

== Biography ==
Schoras is the daughter of an Italian mother and a German father. She studied dance, singing and acting at the Centro di Danza Balletto di Roma. Her mentor Franco Miseria, the artistic director of the school, recognized her talents in all three performing arts and promoted her.

As an actress, she has worked with directors such as Peter Keglevic, Thorsten Näter, Carola Spadoni, Carlo Rola, Francesco Nuti, Martin Gypkens and Peter Bogdanovich. Her film breakthrough role came in Vaya con Dios, for which she recorded the title song and was awarded the Bavarian film prize. Her next film was The Cat's Meow.

Chiara Schoras lives in Germany and Italy and has one daughter.

== Filmography ==
- 1995: OcchioPinocchio
- 1997: Die Schule
- 1997: First Love – Die Liebe ist ein Nadelkissen
- 1997: Große Freiheit
- 1997–1998: Girl friends – Freundschaft mit Herz
- 1999: The Millennium Disaster: Computer Crash 2000
- 1999: Einfach Klasse
- 1999: Picknick im Schnee
- 1999: Racheengel – Stimme aus dem Dunkeln
- 1999: Romantic Fighter
- 1999: Stan Becker: Schiff der Verdammten
- 2000: Falling Rocks
- 2000: Neonnächte
- 2000: Stan Becker: Ein Mann ein Wort
- 2000: Tödliche Wildnis – Sie waren jung und mussten sterben
- 2001: Honolulu
- 2001: Giravolte
- 2001: The Cat's Meow
- 2002: Alicia
- 2002: Das Geheimnis meiner Mutter
- 2002: Vaya con Dios
- 2003: Rosa Roth – Das leise Sterben des Kolibri
- 2003: Die Eltern der Braut
- 2003: Nachts wenn der Tag beginnt
- 2004: Tatort – Nur ein Spiel
- 2005: Was Sie schon immer über Singles wissen wollten
- 2006: Das Glück klopft an die Tür
- 2006: Meine Tochter, mein Leben
- 2006: Nothing but Ghosts
- 2007: Die ProSieben Märchenstunde: Aschenputtel – Für eine Handvoll Tauben
- 2007: Capri You Love?
- 2007: Fast ein Volltreffer
- 2007: Im Namen des Gesetzes
- 2007: SOKO Rhein-Main – Das Versprechen
- 2008: Deadline – Blutspur
- 2008: Hochzeitswalzer (Regie: Andrea Katzenberger)
- 2009: Countdown – Die Jagd beginnt
- 2009: Kommissar LaBréa – Tod an der Bastille
- 2009: NDR Licht aus! Sketch an! (NDR Sketch-Comedy)
- 2009: Tatort – Schwarzer Peter
- 2010-2012: Countdown – Die Jagd beginnt
- 2010: Tulpen aus Amsterdam
- 2013: BlitzBlank
- 2013: Danni Lowinski - Alles Plastik
- 2013: Ruby Red
- 2014: Der Kriminalist – Auf Sand gebaut
- 2014: Die Hochzeit meiner Schwester
- 2014: The Mommy Mafia
- 2014: Ein Sommer in Ungarn
- 2014: Sapphire Blue
