= Sebastian Ströbel =

German film and TV actor (born 1977)

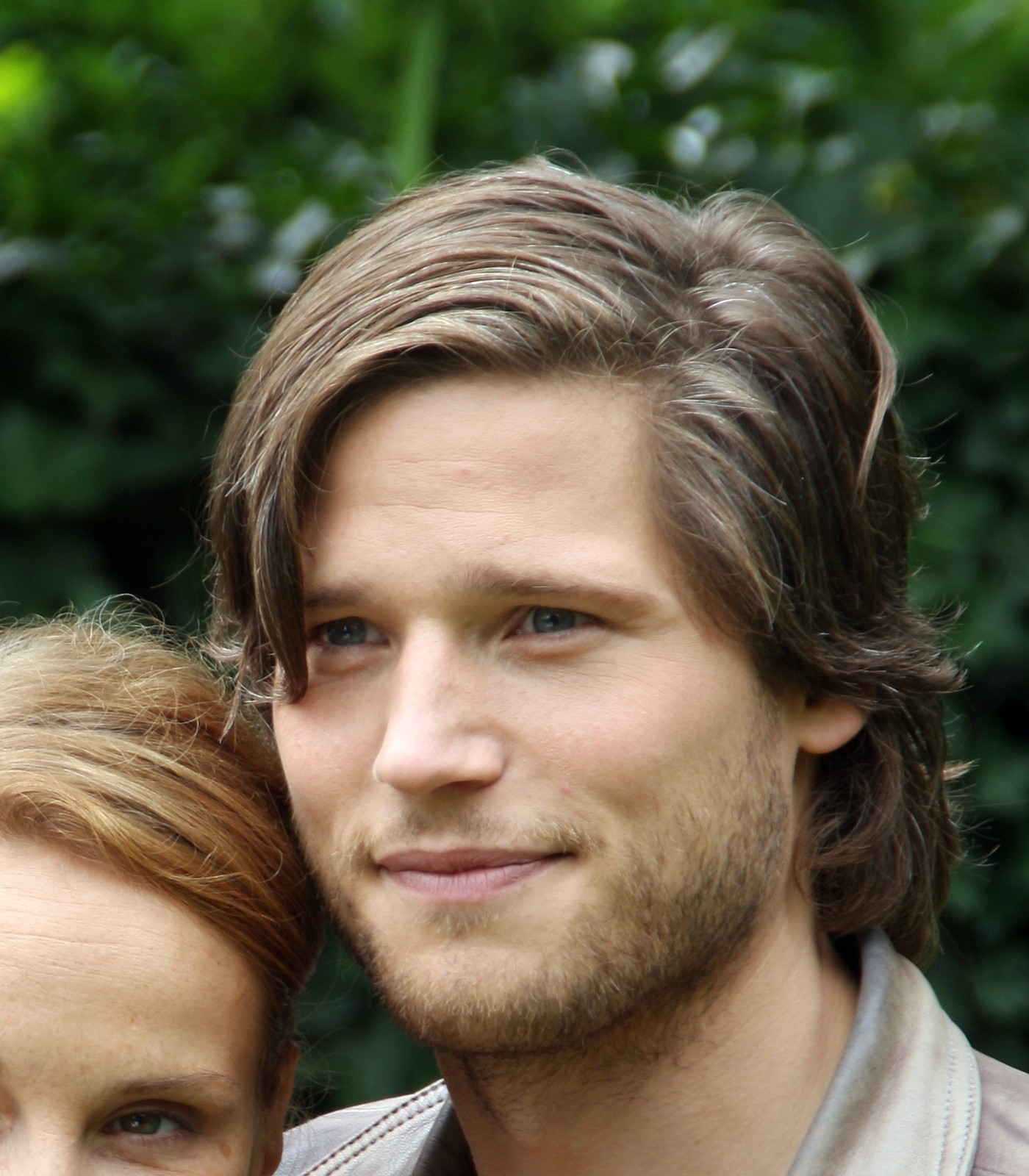
- Born: 2 February 1977; Karlsruhe, West Germany
- Occupation: Actor
- Years active: 1998-present

Sebastian Ströbel (born 2 February 1977) is a German film and TV actor. He is best known for his performance as Jan Brenner in the TV Series Countdown – Die Jagd beginnt (Countdown – The hunt begins) and as Markus Kofler in Die Bergretter (The Mountain Rescuers).

== Selected filmography ==
Film
Year	Title	Role	Notes
2004	Mädchen, Mädchen 2 – Loft oder Liebe		

TV
Year	Title	Role	Notes
2010	Countdown – Die Jagd beginnt		
