= Vaya con Dios (film) =

- Directed by: Zoltan Spirandelli
- Starring: Michael Gwisdek; Daniel Brühl; Traugott Buhre
- Release date: 28 March 2002
- Running time: 106 min
- Country: Germany
- Language: German

Vaya con Dios is a 2002 German comedy film directed by Zoltan Spirandelli, and takes the form of a road film.

== Plot ==
The story follows the journey of three monks of the (fictitious) Cantorian Order of monks, who have until recently lived in the ancient (fictitious) Auersberg Abbey in Brandenburg (shot at Chorin Abbey). The Cantorians speak Latin, and maintain a religious life, in which hierarchy plays a minor role. They believe that the Holy Spirit is revealed in music, particularly in the vocals. Because of this heretical doctrine, the Cantorians have been persecuted by the Roman Catholic Church since 1693. Only two monasteries survived, one in Brandenburg and the mother house at Montecerboli in Italy. At the time of the film's events, the two monasteries have not been on speaking terms for two hundred years, because Auersberg kept the unique manuscript copy of the order's rule, Regula cantorianorum, against the wishes of Montecerboli.

The German community in Brandenburg is facing ruin, the monastery is dilapidated and run down, and the order can't pay the mortgage. On the death of the last Abbot, Stephen (Traugott Buhre), who had always shielded his monastery from the world, the remaining three monks, following Abbot Stephen's dying behest, abandon their home to join the mother house in Italy, taking the Regula with them.

Totally unprepared for the outside world, the three monks start off on foot across Europe, until they cause the young journalist, Chiara (Chiara Schoras), to veer off the road in her classic Mercedes-Benz convertible. She subsequently helps them to reach their destination.

Along the way, each of the monks faces his own temptation. Brother Arbo (Daniel Brühl), the youngest monk, who has lived in the monastery all his life, falls in love with Chiara, and Brother Tassilo (Matthias Brenner) is drawn to return to his parents' farm, which his widowed mother is now running alone. Bibliophile Brother Benno (Michael Gwisdek), meanwhile, is tempted away from his vows by the Jesuit library in Karlsruhe and its malevolent head, Pater Claudius Leis (Joachim Lätsch), formerly Benno's rival in love.

== Music ==
In the film songs from different eras are:

- Perrinet's Bonbard can be heard in the opening credits.
- At the beginning of the film the Auersberg Monastery monks sing Tu solus by Josquin des Prez.
- Igor Strawinsky's Pater noster is sung by the monks walking along the train tracks.
- At the edge of a quarry, before they go to sleep in the forest, the monks sing the beginning of the Gospel of Matthew in Fauxbourdon style.
- As the Gloria song at the Jesuits' conventual Sunday Mass, they sing a three-part setting of Georg Neumark's 17th century hymn Wer nur den lieben Gott läßt walten, written for the film by Tobias Gravenhorst, who also plays the organist.
- At the end of the film in Montecerboli, the reunited order sings again Tu solus.
- The actress Chiara Schoras sings music by Detlef Friedrich Petersen in the credits. Petersen was also the composer of the non-vocal music in the film.

Music plays an important part of the story-line, with the three monks spontaneously breaking into song throughout the film, although it would be wrong to consider the film a musical, as the music does not advance the plot as in a musical: the story is about a group of monks who sing. Similarly, although it has elements of both comedy and romance it would be wrong to call the film a romcom.

== Cast ==
- Michael Gwisdek - Benno
- Daniel Brühl - Arbo
- Traugott Buhre - Abt Stefan
- Chiara Schoras - Chiara
- Matthias Brenner - Tassilo
- Pamela Knaak - Frau Brenner
- Konstantin Graudus - Anwalt
- Remo della Rena - Italian Monk
- Giulio Alimenti - Italian Monk
- Giulio Cupelli - Italian Monk
- Jessica Franz - Frau auf dem Rűcksitz

== Singers ==
- Meindert Zwart – countertenor
- Henning Voß – countertenor
- Joachim Duske – tenor
- Thomas Wittig – bass
