= Stefanie Stappenbeck =

German actress (born 1974)

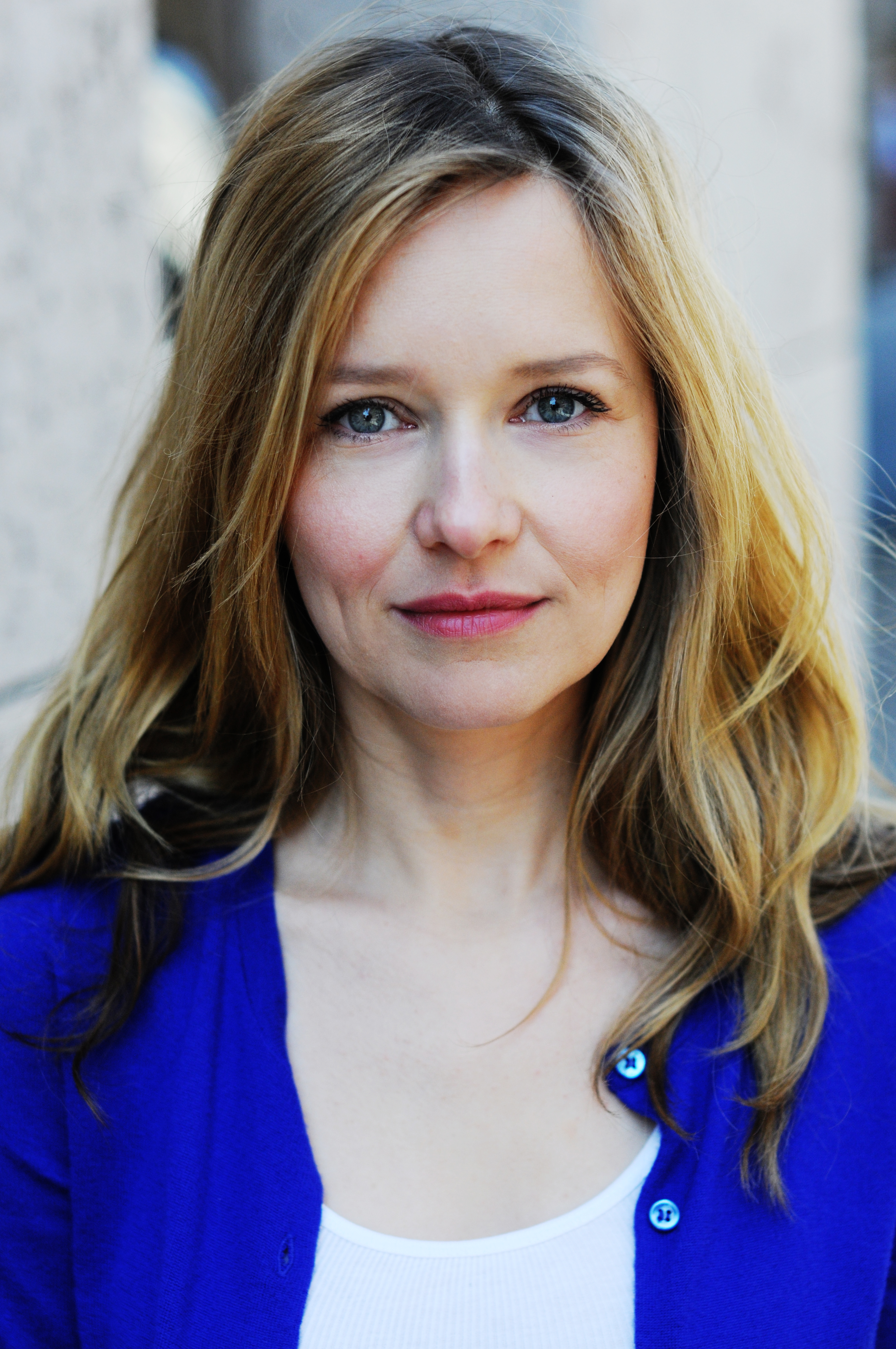
- Stefanie Stappenbeck in 2012
- Born: 11 April 1974 (age 52); Potsdam, East Germany
- Occupation: Actress
- Years active: 1986–present

Stefanie Stappenbeck (born 11 April 1974) is a German actress. She has appeared in more than 100 films and television shows since 1986.

== Selected filmography ==
- Sisters from Hell (1997)
- Red as Blood (1998, TV film)
- Days of Darkness (1999, TV film)
- Golden Boy (2000, TV film)
- Deutschlandspiel (2000, TV film)
- Die Manns – Ein Jahrhundertroman (2001, TV film)
- Hotte in Paradise (2002, TV film)
- September (2003)
- Sex & more (2004, TV film)
- Barfuss (2005)
- Happy as One (2006)
- 1½ Knights – In Search of the Ravishing Princess Herzelinde (2008)
- Der Tiger oder Was Frauen lieben! (2009, TV film)
- Klassentreffen 1.0 (2018)
- The Wedding (2020)
