= Well Done (1994 film) =

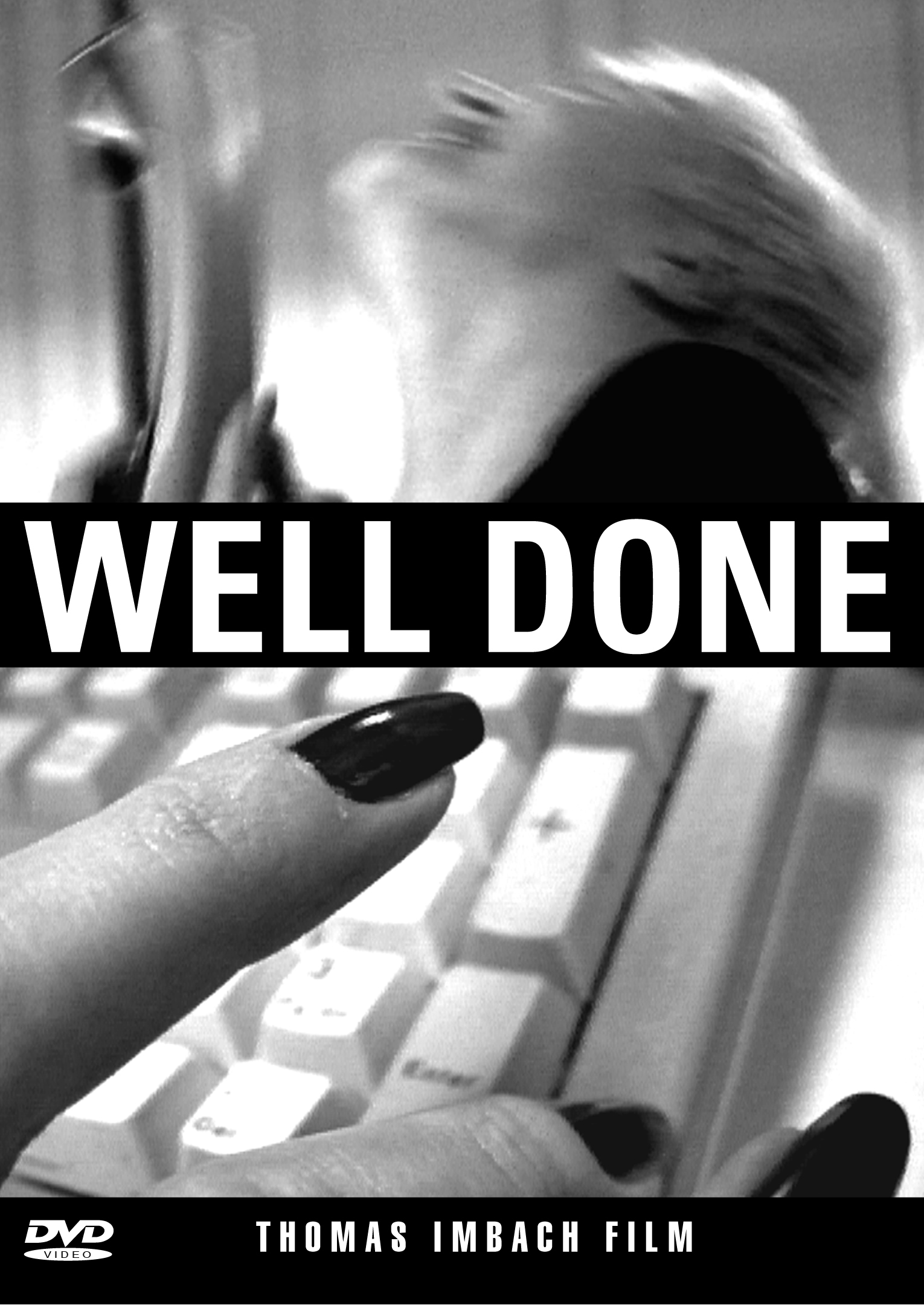
- Directed by: Thomas Imbach
- Screenplay by: Thomas Imbach, Monika Gsell
- Produced by: Thomas Imbach
- Cinematography: Jürg Hassler, Thomas Imbach
- Edited by: Thomas Imbach, Jürg Hassler
- Music by: Peter Bräker
- Release date: 1994
- Running time: 75 minutes
- Country: Switzerland
- Languages: Swiss German, German

Well Done is a documentary by Swiss director Thomas Imbach. It documents the everyday life of a Swiss telebanking company. For months, the director accompanied the company's characters with his camera and, by means of thematic sequences, shows their behaviour and feelings in the everyday office life of an IT company in Zurich, which is determined by electronic technologies. Well Done premiered at the Solothurn Film Festival in 1994; it won the Fipresci Prize in the competition of the International Leipzig Festival for Documentary and Animated Film.

== Plot ==
1994: In a Swiss high-tech company, more than 1200 people are busy controlling the daily billions in Swiss monetary transactions in the form of endless data streams. Individual figures emerge from the mass of employees in the labyrinthine building. The camera follows the inconspicuous gestures, ways of speaking and glances of the PC supporter, the key account manager, the Goldcard clerk, the product manager, the department head, the director. A serial montage weaves the everyday life of the protagonists into a dense image-sound structure. The viewer is immersed in a world in which the subtle violence of electronic technologies shapes interpersonal communication and leaves traces even in private spaces.

== Cast ==
- Mirjam Langhans: Goldcard clerk
- Marco de Luca: product manager
- Maja Bertossa: department head
- Walter Winkler: PC supporter
- Gerda Schmidheiny: key account manager
- Ueli Kunz: director

== Background ==
Well Done portrays a Swiss telebanking company as an exemplary place of the post-industrial working world. It is 1994 and everyday office life takes place in front of the computer and mainly on the telephone receiver. The colloquial language is permeated by ubiquitous business English, while the architecture of the offices and the deserted corridors is reminiscent of futuristic landscapes. Well Done makes it clear that the totality of an economised world has long since taken hold of the private sphere and that efficiency and utilitarian thinking prevail there, just as they do in the world of capital itself.

== Reception ==
"It is also unusual that the individual should not be recognisable as an individual, but as a member of a group, defined by working contexts. [...] What is fascinating now, however, is how the film is staged as a sensual event. Thomas Imbach has already proven himself in Restlessness through a pronounced sense of rhythm and colour effects. Colour and rhythm are the defining elements of Well Done as well. (Excerpt)".

"Without any lamentation, but with absurd comedy, Well Done demonstrates the total domination of our economic system: from the telephone operator who even speaks to her colleagues in customer jargon, to the managers who still calculate while jogging, to the employee who already has a kind of qualification discussion with his son of secondary school age. Not a film about the office world, then, but about our lives - one of the best for a long time."
