= Matthias Brenner =

German actor, director and writer

Matthias Brenner (born 10 September 1957) is a German actor, director and writer.

Matthias Brenner was born in Meiningen, Bezirk Suhl, East Germany, the son of actor Carl Rüdiger Brenner (1924–1984). He spent his childhood there.

He began his acting career in amateur theatre, and between 1979 and 1982 he studied acting at the Hochschule für Schauspielkunst, East Berlin. From 1985 to 1990 he was in Erfurt, and today he lives in Berlin.

== Career ==
As author for the General cargo Verlag Munich, he writes mainly works for the stage and film scripts, including an adaptation of The Hunchback of Notre-Dame by Victor Hugo, Effi Briest by Theodor Fontane, Das Märchen von der verlorenen Zeit und Nullhundertneunzig

In addition to writing he has appeared in soap operas and television series such as Tatort (Puppenspieler, Er wird töten), KiKa-Krimi.de and Leipzig Homicide (Gefangen) and in films: Der Zimmerspringbrunnen (2001), Vaya con Dios (2002), Peas at 5:30 (2004), Die Zeit nach der Trauer (2003), The Lives of Others (2006), According to the Plan (2006), Hotel Lux (2011), Russian Disco (2012) and Charité (role: Ernst von Bergmann) (2017).
