= Aschenbrödel und der gestiefelte Kater =

- Film poster for 'Aschenbrödel und der gestiefelte Kater'
- Directed by: Torsten Künstler
- Written by: Sarah Altmann Jacob Grimm Wilhelm Grimm
- Based on: Cinderella
- Starring: Ezra Finzi Samuel Finzi Sarah Altmann
- Music by: Dirk Reichardt
- Production company: Märchenfilm Märchenhütte Berlin
- Distributed by: Märchenfilm
- Release date: 20 November 2013 (Germany)
- Running time: 1 hour (approx.)
- Countries: Germany, Austria
- Language: German
- Box office: $221,501

Aschenbrödel und der gestiefelte Kater is a 2013 German fairy tale film directed by film director Torsten Künstler. It was produced in Germany. This film is based on an earlier work, Aschenputtel (Cinderella), a literary work the Brothers Grimm published in 1812. The main stars of the film were Ezra Finzi, Samuel Finzi, and Sarah Altmann.

== Plot ==
Five-year-old Paul doesn't like the fact that he's moving to Berlin with his family at all. He likes the quiet country life, because in his peaceful home he has been able to devote himself intensively to reading fairy tales. When he arrives in the chaotic capital, he quickly begins to feel lonely. However, due to a magical incident, this suddenly changes. Puss in Boots appears before Paul's eyes and asks him for help. He has to accompany the cat into the world of fairy tales, as the creatures there are slowly beginning to forget them. The only chance is that Paul supports the cat and Cinderella (Aschenbrödel) in performing their respective fairy tales in front of the other creatures and thus revitalizing their belief in the fairy tale world.

== Cast ==
- Ezra Finzi as Paul
- Samuel Finzi as Pauls Vater
- Marie-Lou Sellem as Pauls Mutter
- Claudia Graue as Aschenbrödel
- Carsta Zimmermann as Der gestiefelte Kater
- Sarah Strelocke as Lina
- Maxim Mehmet as Chefkoch
- Roger Jahnke as Prinz
- Sascha Alexander as Immobilienmakler
- Jacob Braune as Ben
- Arsseni Bultmann as Hendrik
- Vlad Chiriac as Das tapfere Schneiderlein
- Ina Gercke as Rotkäppchen
- Rebekka Köbernick as Schneewittchen
- Anno Koehler as Hans im Glück
- Nicole Lechmann as Frau des Chefkochs
- Thorsten Schnier as Müllersohn
- Claas Schroeder as Lars

== Production and aftermath ==
Aschenbrödel und der gestiefelte Kater was filmed in Germany. The film was produced by Märchenfilm and Märchenhütte Berlin. The movie ended up bringing in a gross of $221,501 worldwide.

== Critical reception ==
Filmstarts-REDAKTION provided the following Critical Reception, "The future of cinema is called "MiKi" – participatory cinema! At least that's what those responsible at Märchenfilm GmbH want, who have produced a participatory cinema film with "Cinderella and Puss in Boots" - a kind of event cinema for children, where clapping and heckling are actively encouraged. Torsten Künstler, who has previously worked primarily as a co-director and assistant director, including on "Keinohrhasen" and "Jesus loves me", delivers a somewhat half-baked mixture of feature film scenes and a filmed theater performance, especially the very small ones It should still be fun for moviegoers. Little Paul moves from the country to Berlin with his parents and the teddy bear MiKi with him - and with a heavy heart he has to return to his beloved tree house and the collection housed there Leave fairytale characters behind."

The kinderfilmwelt claims "the film makes you want to go to a real children's theater again - with real actors who can actually see you. Anyone who lives in Berlin should definitely visit the Berlin Fairy Tale Hut."
