= Shadi Hedayati =

German actress (b. 1985)

Shadi Hedayati (born 1985) is a German actress. She became known for her role as Zari in the Sat.1 production Die Schlikkerfrauen.

== Early life ==
Hedayati was born in Bochum, Germany, to parents from Iran. Between 2001 and 2009, she studied singing, dancing and acting.

== Career ==
She made her debut as a theatre actress in the 2008 play Der Messias. She was also a part of the cast in Antigone and Winnetou and the Crossbreed. Hedayati made her first appearance on TV in the German legal dramedy Danni Lowinski in 2010. Her cinematic debut followed in 2012, when she had a guest role in Freshly Squeezed. She played the lead for the first time in an episode of the ZDF production Flemming.

Hedayati was cast as the main character Selma Hadschi in the RTL pilot Scarlet & Hadschi. She made her first appearance as a lead character in a television film in the 2014 Sat.1 movie Die Schlikkerfrauen taking on the role of Schlikker employee Zari. One year later, she played the lead in the comedy Die Udo Honig Story. In the Sat.1 crime series 23 Cases, Hedayati plays the main character Tara Schöll, a Federal Criminal Police officer, who thinks a convicted criminal is innocent. Although production started in 2015, the series is yet to air.

Hedayati starred as counter-terrorism investigator Pinar in the pilot Hamdullah – Im Namen Allahs (Hamdullah – In the Name of Allah) in 2015.

Hedayati lives in Cologne.

== Selected filmography ==
- 2010: Danni Lowinski (one episode)
- 2012: Freshly Squeezed
- 2012: Alarm für Cobra 11 – Die Autobahnpolizei (episode 17x05)
- 2012: Flemming (episode 3x06)
- 2014: Die Schlikkerfrauen
- 2014: Binny and the Ghost (episode 1x08)
- 2015: Die Udo Honig Story
- 2017: Stuttgart Homicide (episode 8x25)
