= Jeanette Hain =

German actress (born 1969)

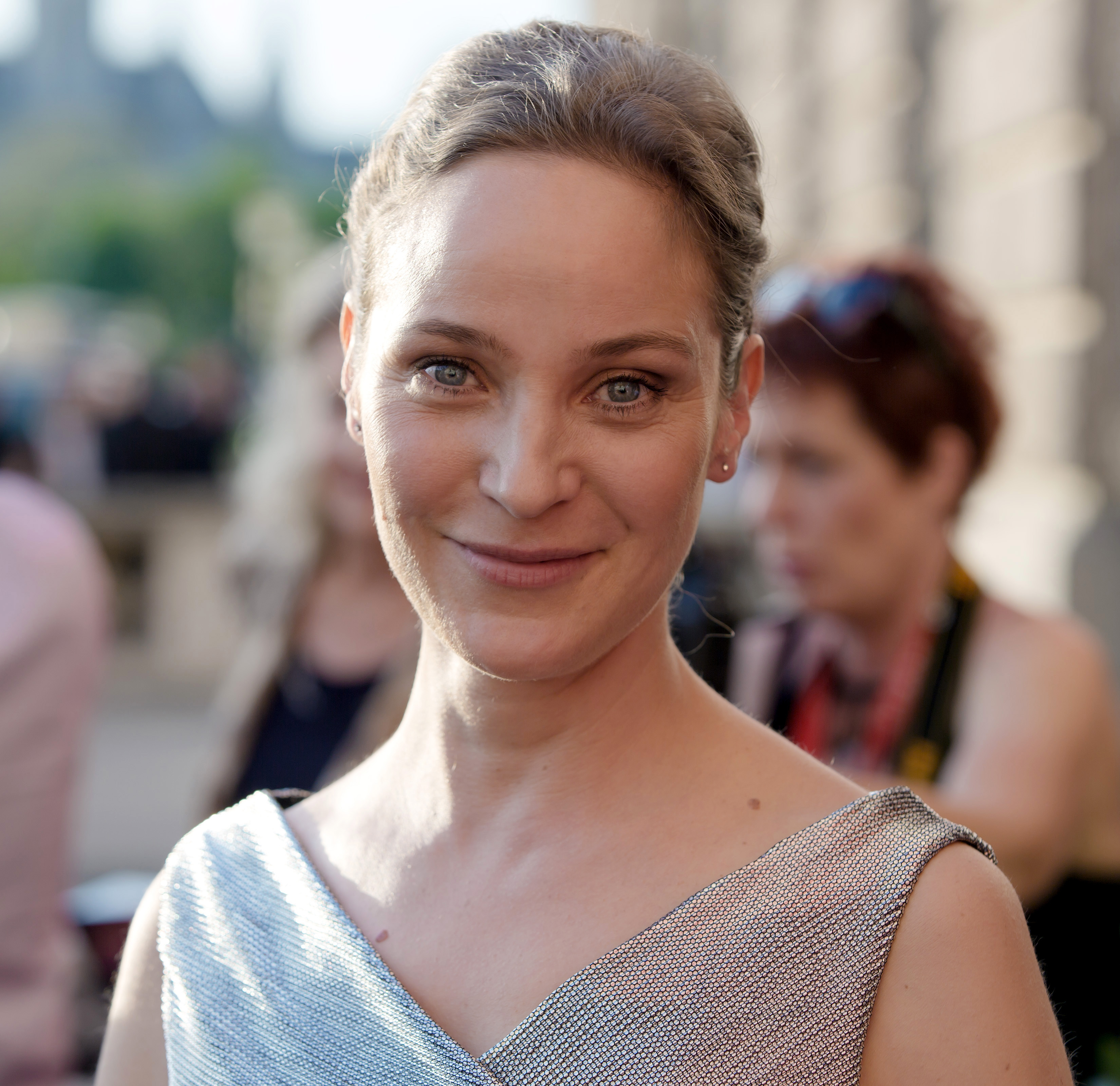
Jeanette Hain in 2015

Jeanette Hain (born 18 February 1969, Munich) is a German film actress. She appeared in more than 90 film and television productions since 1990. Hain is perhaps best-known to international audiences as Ralph Fiennes' girlfriend in the Academy Award-winning film The Reader (2008).

== Filmography (selection) ==
- Die Cellistin (1998, TV film)
- The Trio (1998)
- Mrs. Rettich, Czerni and I (1998)
- Requiem for a Romantic Woman (1999)
- The Farewell (2000)
- The Journey to Kafiristan (2001)
- The Architects (2004, TV film)
- Bis in die Spitzen (2005, TV series)
- The Reader (2008)
- The Countess (2009)
- Germany 09 (2009)
- The Young Victoria (2009)
- Transfer (2010)
- The Poll Diaries (2010)
- Run Boy Run (2013)
- The Forbidden Girl (2013)
- Divine Sparks (2014, TV film)
- Therapy for a Vampire (2014)
- Head Full of Honey (2014)
- Klassentreffen 1.0 (2018)
- Never Look Away (2018)
- Young Woman and the Sea (2024)
- Trial of Hein (Der Heimatlose) (2026)
- The Death of Sherlock Holmes (2027, TV series)
