= Thomas Imbach =

Swiss filmmaker

- Born: 1962
- Occupations: Film Director; Producer

Thomas Imbach (born 1962) is a Swiss director and independent filmmaker based in Zürich, Switzerland. With his production company Bachim Films, Imbach produced his own work until 2007. He then founded Okofilm Productions with director/producer Andrea Staka. All of his films have been theatrically released and Imbach has won numerous awards for his work, both in Switzerland and abroad.

== Career ==
Imbach established his trademark audio-visual style with Well Done (1994) and Ghetto (1997), which is based on a combination of cinema- verité camerawork and fast-paced editing. His fiction features Happiness is a Warm Gun (nominated for the Golden Leopard at Locarno International Film Festival), as well as Lenz (2006), I Was a Swiss Banker (2007) and the fictive autobiography Day is Done (2011) all premiered at the Berlinale. His latest feature film Mary Queen of Scots celebrated its premiere in Locarno and at the Toronto International Film Festival in 2013. His latest documentary Nemesis celebrated its international premiere at International Documentary Film Festival Amsterdam 2020, where it received the Prize for Best Cinematography. Thomas Imbach is currently considered one of the most unconventional and consistent Swiss filmmakers.

== Filmography ==
=== As Writer/Director/Producer ===
- Say God Bye, 2023, Documentary, iPhone and 35mm, 124 min. Premiered in Proxima Competition of Karlovy Vary International Film Festival 2023.
- Nemesis, 2020, Documentary, 35mm, 132 min. Premiered in competition at Visions du Réel Nyon 2020.
- My Brother, My Love, 2018, Autobiographical inspired feature film, Arriraw and 35mm, 114 min. Premiered in competition at Locarno Film Festival 2018 - Received Zurich Film Award 2018.
- Mary Queen of Scots, 2013, Fiction feature film, 35mm, 100 min. Co-produced by Okofilm Productions, Schweizer Radio und Fernsehen, SRG SSR, ARTE, Sciapode Productions. World Premiere: Locarno 2013, competition, International Premiere: Toronto Film Festival 2013, special presentations.
- Day is Done, 2011, an autobiographical fiction, 35mm (DCP), 111 min. Coproduction: Okofilm, Zurich, SRF Schweizer Radio und Fernsehen and ARTE. World Premiere Berlinale 2011, Forum, Yamagata International Documentary Film Festival, Competition.
- Retrospective at the 13. BAFICI Festivals in Buenos Aires, 2011: I Was a Swiss Banker, Lenz, Happiness Is a Warm Gun, Well Done.
- I Was a Swiss Banker, 2007, Drama, 35mm, 75 min. Underwater fairy tale of the Swiss Banker Roger Caviezel. Premiered at the 57th International Film Festival Berlin - Swiss Film Awards 2008, Nomination Best Actor - Zurich Film Awards 2008, Special Jury award.
- Retrospectives 2007 - 2009: happiness is a warm gun, THE THOMAS IMBACH FILMS in: BERLIN, Arsenal-Kino, WIEN, Votiv-Kino, US-tour (08/09): HOUSTON/TX, Museum of Fine Arts, SAN ANTONIO/TX, European Film Festival, WASHINGTON D.C., National Gallery of Arts, DENVER/CO, Denver Film Festival, New York City, Anthology Film Archives a.o.
- Lenz am Berg, 2006, 35mm; Film Installation, 3-Channel-Projection Kunsthaus Zurich: In the Alps, 10/2006 – 01/2007.
- Lenz, 2006, Drama 35mm, 98 min. Contemporary adaptation of Georg Büchner's „Lenz“ - Premiered at the 56th International Film Festival Berlin.
- happy too, 2002, Digi-Beta, 60 min. “happy too” parallels the Kelly-Bastian relationship with the struggles of the actors in “Happiness is a Warm Gun”, Premiered at the International Film Festival Locarno 2002, Cinéastes du Présent
- Happiness is a Warm Gun, 2001, Drama, 35mm, 92 min., Drama on the mystic death of the lovers Petra Kelly und Gert Bastian. - Nominated for the Golden Leopard 2001, International Film Festival Locarno - Official Selection International Film Festival Berlin 2002 - Zurich Film Prize, 2001 - Nominated for “Best Swiss Feature Film”, 2001 - Quality Award (Swiss Ministry of Culture)
- Portrait Film on Thomas Imbach “Die Kamera als Sonde”, 2000, Beta-SP, 60 min. by Christoph Hübner for WDR/3Sat
- Nano-Babies, 1998, 35mm (Cinemascope), 45 min. Science-Fiction essay on babies of high-tech researchers for Swiss Television/3SAT - Commissioned by Swiss Television and 3Sat
- Ghetto, 1997, Feature documentary, 35mm, 122 Min. Docudrama with teenagers on the sunny side of Zurich's Gold Coast - Best Documentary, International Film Festival Mannheim - Premio Giampaolo Paoli, International Film Festival Florence - Quality Award (Swiss Ministry of Culture) - Zurich Film Prize
- Well Done, 1994, Feature documentary, 35mm, 75 Min. Documentary on employees of a Swiss high-tech bank corporation, FIPRESCI-Prize in Leipzig, Quality Award (Swiss Ministry of Culture) - Art award of the city Lucerne - Zurich Film Prize
- Restlessness, 1991, 16mm, 58 min. Rail-movie with three homeless people in the IC-triangle ZH-BE-BS - Nominated for the Max-Ophüls-Prize, 1991, Quality Award (Swiss Ministry of Culture)
- Schlachtzeichen, 1988, 16mm, 56 min. Doku-comedy about the Swiss Army - Opening film at the Solothurn Film Festival - Student Award (Swiss Ministry of Culture)

=== As producer ===
- Mare, 2020, Fiction feature film, 84 min. Produced by Okofilm Productions, Dinaridi Film, ZDF Zweites Deutsches Fernsehen, ARTE, SRF Schweizer Radio und Fernsehen. Screened at Sektion Panorama at Internationale Filmfestspiele Berlin 2020
- Cure – The Life of Another, 2014, Fiction feature film, 83 min. Produced by Okofilm Productions, Coproduced by Produkcija Ziva, Deblokada Films. Screened at Locarno International Film Festival 2014 (Competition), Sarajevo 2014 (Competition)
- Love Island, 2014, by Jasmila Zbanic, Fiction feature film,35mm Produced by Produkcija Ziva, Deblokada Films. Coproduced by Komplizen Film, MPM Film, Okofilm Productions. Screened at Locarno International Film Festival 2014 (Piazza Grande).

== Publications by or on Imbach ==
- Kino CH / CINÉMA CH, Reception, Aesthetic, History EINE ÄSTHETIK DER WIDERSPRÜCHE. VARIATIONEN ÜBER THOMAS IMBACH (Monographie) by Marcy Goldberg, Schüren Verlag 2008.
- CINEMA 50, „Variations on a Ture Story“, a conversation with Thomas Imbach by Grob and Nathalie Böhler, Schüren Verlag 2005.
- CINEMA 46, „Den Schleier der Wahrnehmung zerreissen“ by Marcy Goldberg (on WELL DONE), Chronos Verlag 2001.
- Dokumentarisch Arbeiten, a studio conversation with Thomas Imbach by Christoph Hübner and Gabriele Voss, Schüren Verlag 1999.
- „My Filmschool“: Werner Nekes Retrospektive, Katalog 1986/87, by Thomas Imbach and Christoph Settele, Zyklop Verlag 1986.

== Other activities ==
- Since 2018: Chairman of the Board of Directors of Neugass Kino AG.
- Jury member at the Zurich Film Festival 2013.
- Jury member at the Hessen Film Foundation, Frankfurt, since 2008.
- Directing-Workshop at the international film schools in Berlin (DFFB), Munich ([HFF Munich|HFF) and Cape Town 99-08.
- Guest speaker at the Swiss film schools Zurich, Lausanne, Geneva, Lucerne 94-09.
- Workshops at the Swiss Federal Institute of Technology Zurich 91-07.
