= Inspektor Rolle =

- Starring: Rufus Beck
- Country of origin: Germany
- No. of seasons: 2
- No. of episodes: 5

Original release
- Release: 2002 – 2004

Inspektor Rolle is a German television series. The first series, directed by Jörg Grünler, appeared in 2002; the second series, in 2004, was directed by Zoltan Spirandelli and comprised two episodes. Both series were produced for Sat. 1 by the Askania Media Filmproduktion GmbH.

== See also ==
- List of German television series
