= Dimiter Gotscheff =

Bulgarian-German theater director

Dimiter Gotscheff (Bulgarian: Димитър Гочев; 26 April 1943 in Parvomai, Bulgaria – 20 October 2013 in Berlin) was a Bulgarian-born German theater director. His work is often associated with dramatist and director Heiner Müller.
