= Flemming (TV series) =

- Genre: Crime
- Created by: Gregor Edelmann
- Starring: Samuel Finzi; Claudia Michelsen
- Theme music composer: Colin Towns
- Country of origin: Germany
- No. of seasons: 3
- No. of episodes: 22

Production
- Running time: 43 Minutes

Original release
- Network: ZDF
- Release: 13 November 2009 – 9 November 2012

Flemming is a German television crime series that aired from 2009 until 2012, starring Samuel Finzi as the title character.

== Plot ==
The main character is police psychologist Vince Flemming, who uses his skills to help solve difficult criminal cases in Berlin. He supports his ex-wife Ann Gittel, who works for the LKA 1. The place of action is the German capital Berlin. Gittel is also supported by KHK Blum. In season 1, LKA 1 was headed by Dr. Karl Leo, the director of criminal investigations, and as of season 2, by Walli Hoven, the director of criminal investigations. With Walli Hoven, the secretary Mette Jumarowski, who initially does not get along with Flemming, also joins the team. With the beginning of season 3, the investigation team is supplemented by the police photographer Robert Anda.

== Guests ==
- Jean-Yves Berteloot as Dr. Baschyi Aschurew
- Shadi Hedayati as Ruba Abou-Fadi
