= Milan Peschel =

German actor

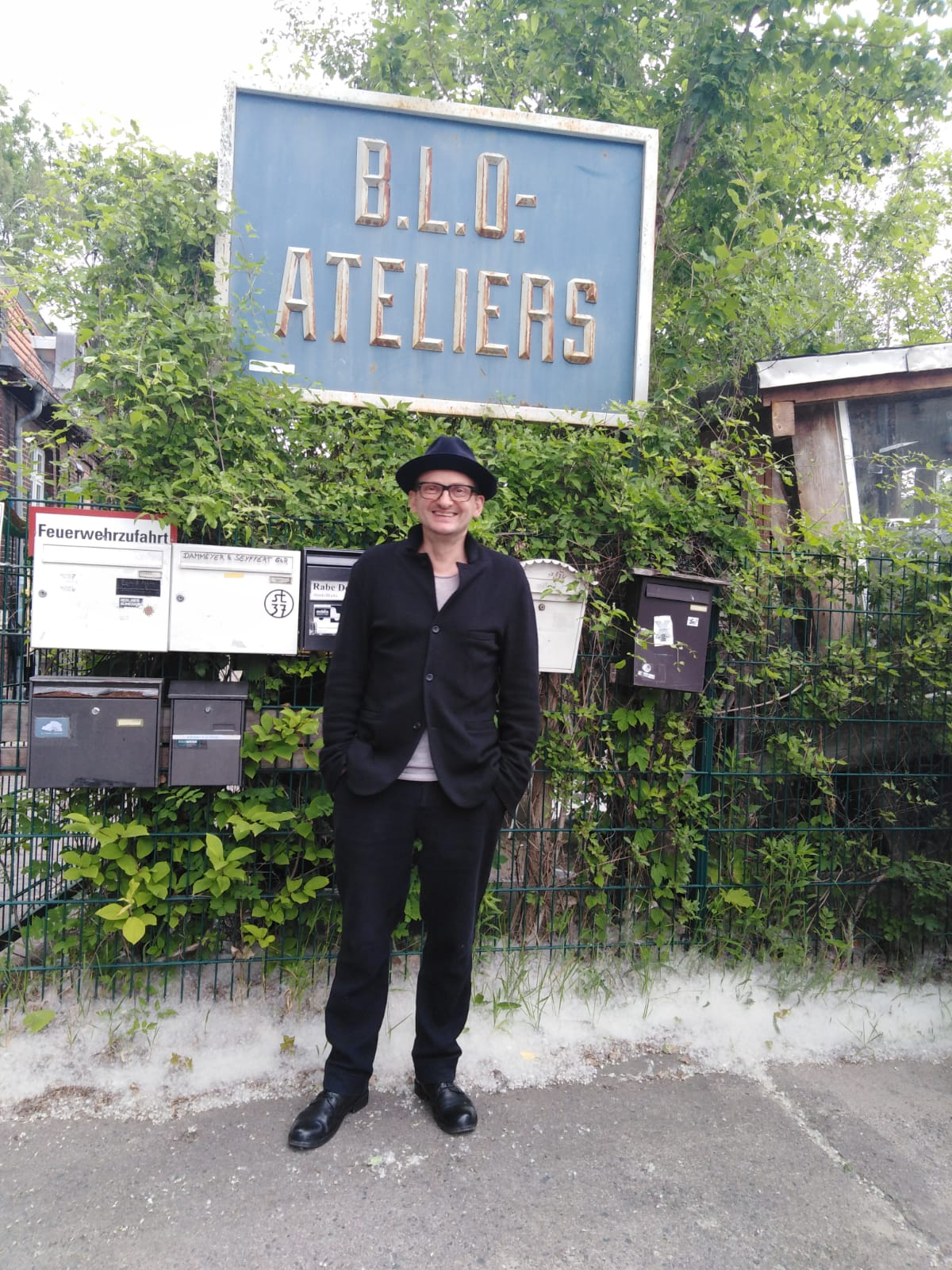
- Milan Peschel
- Born: 1968 (age 57–58); East Berlin, East Germany
- Occupation: Actor
- Years active: 1999–present

Milan Peschel (born in 1968) is a German actor. He has appeared in more than fifty films since 1999.

== Selected filmography ==
Year	Title	Role	Notes
2005	Netto	Marcel Werner	
2006	Black Sheep	Peter Harminsky	
2006	Lenz	Lenz	
2007	Reclaim Your Brain	Phillip	
2007	Eight Miles High		
2009	Sometime in August	Thomas	
2010	Jew Suss: Rise and Fall	Werner Krauss	
2011	Stopped on Track	Frank	
2011	What a Man	Volker	
2014	Therapy Crashers	Thomas Vierzig	
2015	The Manny	Rolf Horst	
2017	The Captain	Reinhard Freitag	
2018	Klassentreffen 1.0	Andreas	
2019	Auerhaus	F2M2	
2020	The Wedding	Andreas	
2023	The Palace	Caspar Tell	
2026	Extrawurst	Hans-Günther Schnippering (caretaker)	Cinema film
