= Manta, Manta =

1991 German film

- Theatrical release poster
- Directed by: Wolfgang Büld
- Written by: Stefan Cantz
- Produced by: Bernd Eichinger; Robert Kulzer; Martin Moszkowicz; Peter Zenk
- Starring: Til Schweiger; Tina Ruland; Stefan Gebelhoff; Lena Sabine Berg; Michael Kessler
- Cinematography: Roland Willaert
- Edited by: Gisela Haller
- Music by: Stefan Will
- Production company: Neue Constantin Film
- Distributed by: Neue Constantin Film; Highlight Video; Koch Media; Phillips; VCL Video; Warner Home Video
- Release date: 3 October 1991
- Running time: 91 minutes
- Country: Germany
- Language: German

Manta, Manta is a 1991 German action comedy film directed by Wolfgang Büld. The film features Til Schweiger, Tina Ruland, Stefan Gebelhoff, Lena Sabine Berg and Michael Kessler in the lead roles. Singer/songwriter Sylkie Monoff makes a small appearance. It was released in Germany on 3 October 1991 and in Hungary on 17 April 1992. The English title of the film was Racin' in the Street. Four weeks before the film was released Manta – Der Film was shown in theaters, which also focused on Opel Manta in a comedic way, see "Manta jokes".

Actors Til Schweiger, Tina Ruland and Michael Kessler started their film acting careers with Manta, Manta.

== Plot ==
In the Ruhr area: Bertie (Til Schweiger) is the proud owner of a heavily tuned up Opel Manta. Together with his friends Gerd (Stefan Gebelhoff), Klausi (Michael Kessler) and Hakan (Ömer Simsek) he enjoys driving in his Opel Manta as a hobby. One day, while Bertie is driving his car in a race against a VW Golf GTI, a Mercedes driver Axel (Martin Armknecht), comes up rapidly from behind. While sensible Gerd lets him pass, provocative Hakan chases him and hits his car which slows Axel down, but eventually they all gather at a fast food joint. Axel is offended and furiously shouts "Can you not practice on the hill you idiots?" After a few scuffles and insults from Axel towards Bertie and his friends, Bertie challenges Axel to a race which Axel agrees to only after Bertie stakes the money which he and his girlfriend Uschi have saved to set up their family home. Uschi, who gets angry with Bertie for staking all their money and because she thinks that Bertie pays more attention to his car than her, meets nightclub owner Helmut, who offers her a slot in a beauty contest, which she accepts to make Bertie jealous.

Bertie and his friends start preparing for the race. Klausi, while driving in Gerd's car, which was lent to him temporarily for his birthday, arrives at an ice cream joint where he mixes up the gears and his car accidentally hits Helmut. Helmut, embarrassed by this incident, starts chasing Klausi driving in Gerd's car with his Ferrari 328 GTS and Klausi unintentionally ends up sinking Gerd's car in a lake, misdirecting Helmut. Later, with the help of Hakan, they manage to pull the car out of the lake and restore it to working condition. Meanwhile, on the way to Westfalen Stadium, Dortmund, Bertie has damaged the engine of his car by over-revving it despite Gerd's warnings in a street race against a Bavarian BMW 3 Series full of Bayern Munich fans heading for the stadium. They both then push the car to the nearby workshop where Gerd was previously fired from and fit the engine of a parked track car into Bertie's car. Bertie and Gerd then proceed to Helmut's nightclub, where Bertie objects to Uschi's participation in the beauty contest. Helmut tells him not to bother Uschi, takes him aside, punches him and bans him from entering his nightclub. Bertie then gets heavily drunk at a fast food joint while listening with Gerd to a radio station broadcasting Manta jokes and later also a secretly taken recording of his explanation of his lifestyle to a radio station intern called Florentine (Lena Sabine Berg). Hearing this, Bertie gets angry and goes to the radio station where he creates a rumpus and consequently the radio station's security guard throws him out, along with Gerd and Florentine. The three then go back to Helmut's nightclub where Bertie happens to encounter Axel. Axel, aware of Bertie's condition, challenges Bertie to race immediately.

Despite his condition, Bertie gets into his Manta and goes to the place where the race is to be held. Meanwhile, Uschi won the beauty contest at Helmut's nightclub and after Gerd warns her that Bertie is about to race despite being drunk, she takes Helmut's keys and drives off in his Ferrari to stop Bertie from racing. Uschi arrives and tells Bertie that she is pregnant and will soon give birth to his child; the two make up again. Klausi races Bertie's car against Axel. While Helmut, who came to collect his Ferrari, furiously leaves the area, Axel comes at him on full throttle and his Mercedes collides with Helmut's Ferrari, propelling the Mercedes against a lamp post and totally trashing it, enabling Klausi to win the race.

== Cast ==
- Til Schweiger as Bertie
- Tina Ruland as Uschi
- Stefan Gebelhoff as Gerd
- Lena Sabine Berg as Florentine
- Michael Kessler as Klausi
- Ömer Simsek as Hakan
- Martin Armknecht as Axel
- Nadja Naidenow as Angie
- Beatrice Manowski as Sabine
- Karin Johnson as Freundin Axel
- Uwe Fellensiek as Disco-Besitzer
- Jürgen Schornagel as Herr Ecker
- Jockel Tschiersch as Radio-DJ
- Olaf Ploetz as Vorsitzender Taubenverein
- Liz Becker as Berties Mutter
- Paul Faßnacht as Berties Vater
- Alexander von Eisenhart-Rothe as Axels Freund
- Norman Price as GTI-Fahrer
- Sepp Schauer as Bayernfan
- Horst D. Scheel as Schuldirektor
- Werner Karle Jr. as Angestellter Tankstelle
- Sylkie Monoff as school girl

== Reception ==
The film received positive reviews and was declared a semi-hit at the German box office. The film was appreciated by film critics for its car stunt scenes. The film became very popular among German youth. IMDb rated the film 5.4 out of 10.

A sequel to the film was released in 2023, named "Manta, Manta: Legacy", 32 years after the original film. Til Schweiger, Tina Ruland, Michael Kessler and Marin Armknecht reprised their roles.

== Soundtrack ==
The original soundtrack of the film comprised 17 songs.

Manta, Manta: Original Soundtrack Recording
No.	Title	Length
1.	"Die trinkende Jugend – Du darfst"	3:51
2.	"Katrina And The Waves – Pet The Tiger"	3:51
3.	"L.A. Guns – Some Lie 4 Love"	3:34
4.	"Black Sabbath – Paranoid"	2:47
5.	"Scorpions – Wind Of Change"	5:12
6.	"The Kinks – You Really Got Me"	2:12
7.	"Die Motoristen – Wir fahren Manta Manta"	3:04
8.	"Bizz Nizz – Get Into Trance"	4:12
9.	"Yello – Jungle Bill"	6:09
10.	"Manni Ickx – Manta! Manta!"	3:37
11.	"Seal – Crazy"	4:29
12.	"The KLF – Last Train To Trancentral"	3:37
13.	"Die trinkende Jugend – Heh Mädchen (Wir fahr'n)"	2:15
14.	"The Carmel Cruisers – I'm In Love With My Car"	3:48
15.	"Stytz Syndicate – This Must Be Everything"	3:25
16.	"The Soup Dragons – I'm Free"	3:57
17.	"Extreme – More Than Words"	3:43
Total length:		63:43

== Miscellaneous ==
- In the television series Pastewka, Michael Kessler is shown urinating in his boots, as a spoof to the film's scenes in which he urinates in his boots.
- The title "We drive Manta Manta" that can be heard in the chase scene with Klausi (Michael Kessler) in Gerds Manta and Helmut in his Ferrari, comes from the Berlin punk band King Køng under the pseudonym "Die Motoristen". King Køng broke up in 1993 to favor the re-establishment of Die Ärzte.
- Many sequences were shot in Wuppertal, the school scenes were shot in the local high school Gymnasium Sedanstraße in Wuppertal-Barmen.
- The title song "Manta! Manta!" of the film was sung by Jörg Evers under the pseudonym "Manni Ickx".
