= Sylkie Monoff =

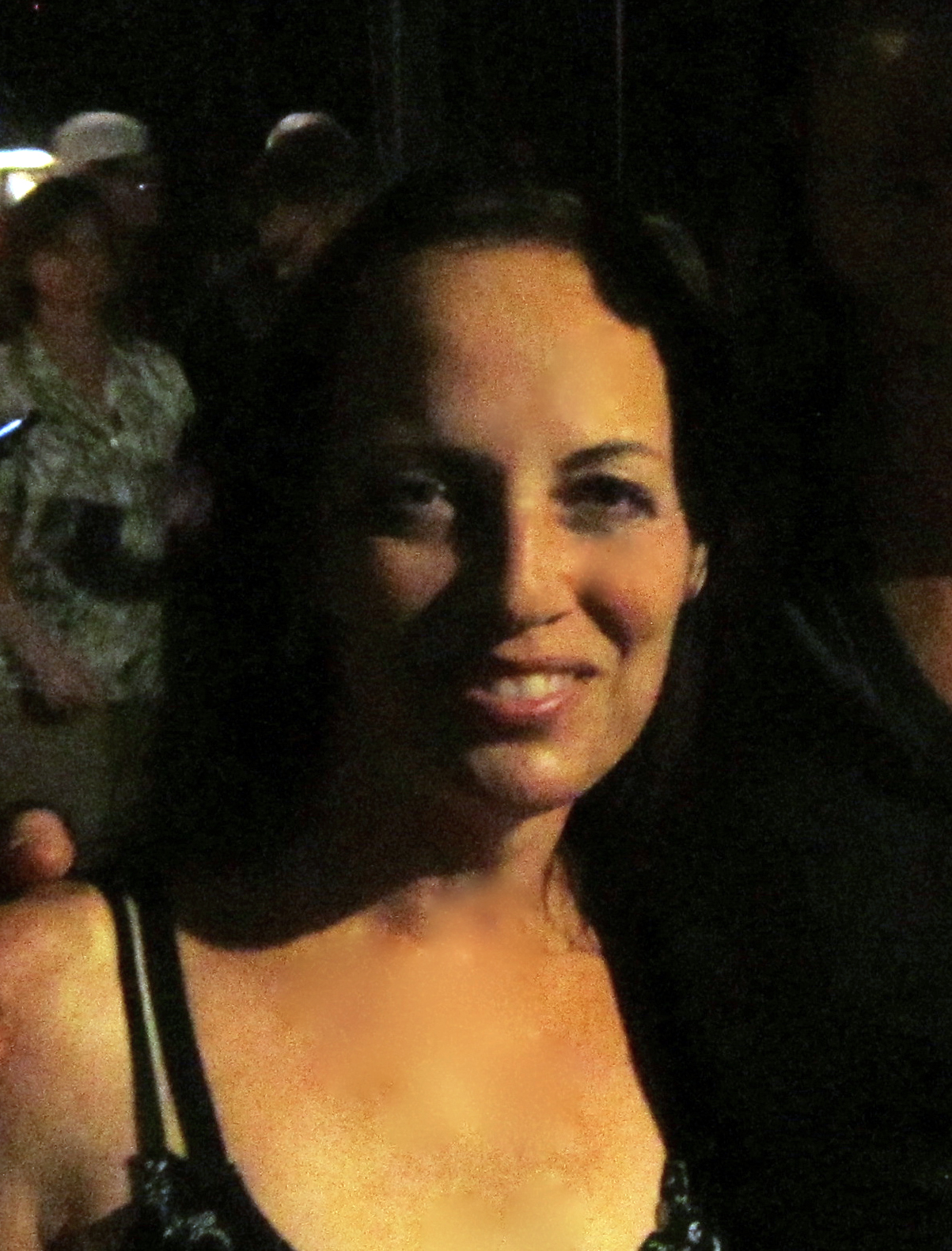
- Sylkie Monoff at The Grand Ole Opry - 2012

Background information
- Born: Wuppertal, West Germany
- Genres: Rock, alternative country, Americana, folk
- Occupations: Musician, singer-songwriter, music producer
- Instruments: Guitar, vocals, harmonica, piano
- Labels: Teldec, BMG, ZYX Music, SYWA Nashville, AVA Records
- Website: sylkiemonoff.com

Sylkie Monoff is a Grammy®-nominated, German born Singer-Songwriter and Music Producer and has appeared in films.

== Life ==
Born in Wuppertal, Sylkie Monoff studied pop music at the Hamburg Conservatory. Her debut album Harbor in the Night BMG Ariola spawned the radio hit "Don't!". The English group BND recorded her song "All the Places", which landed in the top 50 sales charts in Germany and was also awarded Gold (50,000 sold) status in Poland. Her single "The Puzzle" was produced by Mark Schulman (drummer for Pink, Cher, Foreigner).

Monoff's 2010 album Genuine, which reached #1, features Nashville's top studio musicians including, Eddie Bayers and Brent Mason. She has shared the stage with Albert Lee, Julian Dawson, Iain Matthews, Spencer Davis, Howard Carpendale and Melissa Etheridge. She has also appeared in the films Manta, Manta (by Oscar-winning producer Bernd Eichinger) and King Ping. Monoff has won "Best International Country Artist" by the Independent Music Network.

In 2020, the digital re-release of Sylkie Monoff's album "Harbor In The Night" ranked in the Top 50 of the Apple Music Country Album Charts in Germany.

Monoff's single "Still Believe In You" was on the Grammy® Awards 2022 ballots in two categories, "Best Country Song" and "Best Country Solo Performance". She wrote and produced the track. It was released on Monoff's own label SYWA Nashville. In addition, she was nominated for the Independent Music Network Award 2022 as "Comeback Artist Of The Year".

Recently, Monoff has taken more time to collaborate with other artists on their projects. One of the albums she provided backing vocals for, The Fury (Antonio Vergara), received a Grammy® nomination 2025 in the "Best Contemporary Blues Album" category. As a result, Monoff was honored with her first Grammy® Nomination for her participation as Background Vocalist as well. Sylkie Monoff has continued her collaboration with Vergara and also sang Background Vocals on his 2025 release "Vergara Street", which was again listed on the Grammy® Awards ballot 2025/26 in the "Best Contemporary Blues Album" Category. She continues to write and record in Nashville. Sylkie Monoff is also a sought-after educator, clinician and coach for Songwriting, Vocals and Music Business. She has been a mentor to young talent via the Recording Academy's GrammyU programme. and is an elected delegate for the Composers Wing of Germany's P.R.O. GEMA. As a tribute to the late Dolly Parton, Monoff digitally re-released her favorite Parton song "Here You Come Again" in September 2026,

== Albums ==
- Harbor in the Night (1993/2013 BMG)
- Vocals on Nevsky Prospect (David Becker Tribune) (2003 Pinorrek Records)
- Genuine (2010, Monoff Music)
- Harbor in the Night (2020 SYWA Nashville) (Digital Re-Release)
- Vocals on Germerica (David Becker Tribune) (2024 SYWA Nashville)
- Backing Vocals on The Fury (Antonio Vergara) (2024 AVA Records)- Grammy®-nominated in the "Best Contemporary Blues Album" category 2025
- Backing Vocals on Vergara Street (Antonio Vergara) (2025 AVA Records)

== Singles ==
- Your Eyes (1992 BMG Ariola)
- Don't! (1993 BMG Ariola)
- Here You Come Again (2013 GMO The Label)
- Like Rain (2017 GMO The Label)
- The Puzzle (2018 Monoff Music)
- Like Rain (2020 Re-release SYWA Nashville)
- Still Believe In You (2021 SYWA Nashville)
- Lover's Merry-Go-Round Duet with Colin Gordon-Farleigh (2024 Sheer Joy Music)
- Love Don't Need A Reason Why (2024 SYWA Nashville)
- Here You Come Again (2026 SYWA Nashville)

== Included on Compilations ==
- Wendy - Eine Welt Zum Träumen (1997 ZYX Music) (TV Series Soundtrack; Song: All The Places (BND); Discogs: Various - Wendy_Eine Welt Zum Traeumen
- Unter Uns - Vol. 3 (1997 Ultrapop/Edel) (TV Series Soundtrack; Song: All The Places (BND); Discogs: Various - Unter Uns Vol. 3
- Hot Hits 1997 (1997 Time Life/Warner Music); Song: All The Places (BND); Discogs: Various - Hot Hits 1997
- Stars, Hits & Benefiz (1997 BMG); Song: All The Places (BND); Discogs: Various - Stars, Hit & Benefiz
- Mega Dance Hits 1997 (1997 ZYX Music); Song: All The Places (BND); Discogs: Various - 20 Original Mega Dance Hits 1997
- Gay Dancing (1997 ZYX Music); Song: All The Places (BND); Discogs: Various - Gay Dancing
- Top 1997 Part II (1997 River Records Taiwan), Song: All The Places (BND); Discogs: Various -TOP 1997 Part II
- Golden-Dance-Classics (2002 ZYX Music); Re-issued Maxi CD incl. 4 mixes. Song: All The Places (BND); Discogs: Golden Dance Classics
- Disco-Fox Party 2003 (2003 ZYX Music), Song: All The Places (BND);Discogs: Various Disco-Fox Party 2003
- World Of Hits Of The '90s (2005 ZYX Music), Song: All The Places (BND); Discogs: Various - The World Of Hits Of The 90s
- Most-wanted Dance Classics (2007 ZYX Music), Song: All The Places (BND); Discogs: Various Most-Wanted Dance Classics
- New Country Rock Vol. 3 (2011 ZYX Music) Song: Have It All (Sylkie Monoff); Discogs: Various - New Country Rock Vol-3
- Hits Of The 90s (2014 ZYX Music) Song: All The Places (BND); Discogs: Various - Hits Of The 90s

== Other Collaborations ==
- Lyricist for Nikolaus Utermoehlen's film music for crime drama Georgette Meunier - Die Gottesanbeterin (1989, DFFB German Film + TV Academy Berlin Deutsche Film- und Fernsehakademie Berlin, Filmcooperative Switzerland)
- Composer, Lyricist of All The Places by BND, album + single releases, various mixes, on various compilations (1997–2014, ZYX Music); Single: All The Places (BND); Album: Here We Go (BND)

== Filmography ==
- 1991: Manta, Manta
- 2013: King Ping
