= Michael Kessler =

German actor and comedian

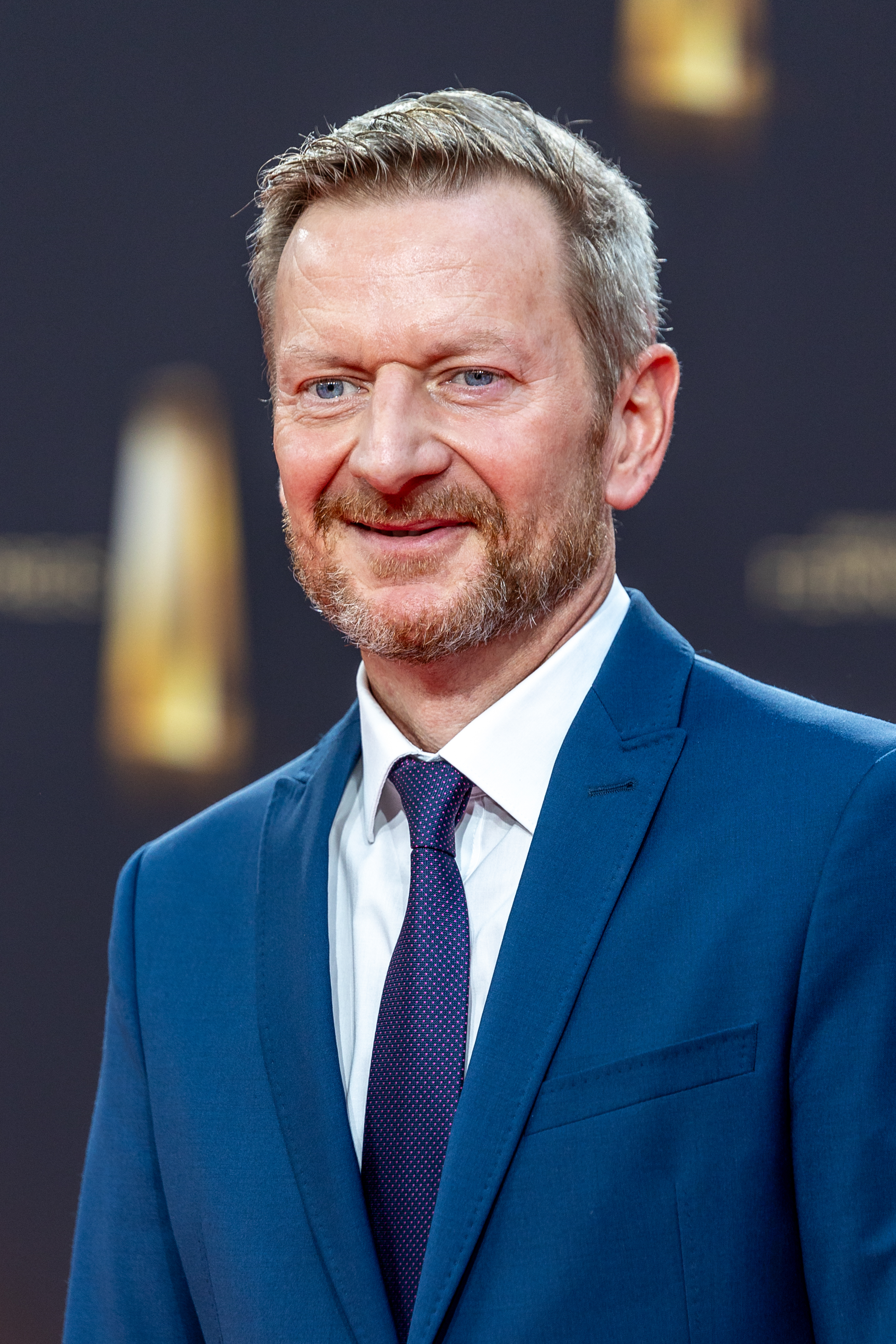
- Kessler in 2023
- Born: 24 June 1967 (age 58); Wiesbaden, West Germany
- Occupations: Actor, comedian, author
- Website: michaelkessler.tv

Michael Kessler (born 24 June 1967) is a German actor, comedian and author.

== Career ==
=== Theater ===
Kessler had his acting training at the Westfälische Schauspielschule Bochum from 1988 to 1992. Afterwards he began acting roles at Schauspielhaus Bochum, Schauspiel Frankfurt, Nationaltheater Mannheim and Schauspielhaus Zürich. Between 2005 and 2009 he starred alongside Christoph Maria Herbst, Bastian Pastewka, and Jürgen Tonkel in the play Männerhort at the Theater am Kurfürstendamm theater in Berlin.

=== Film ===
In 1991, he appeared in the comedy film Manta, Manta and after that he acted in numerous big screen productions like Schtonk!, Little Sharks, and North Curve. In 2006, he starred in Hui Buh: The Goofy Ghost. In 2015, he starred in Schmidts Katze.

=== Short movies ===
In 2002, he had a starring role in the acclaimed film Zwei Wochen Argentinien ("Two Weeks in Argentina"). Later in 2003, he took part in Glückstag ("Lucky Day") and Für gutes Betragen ("For Good Behaviour").

=== Television ===
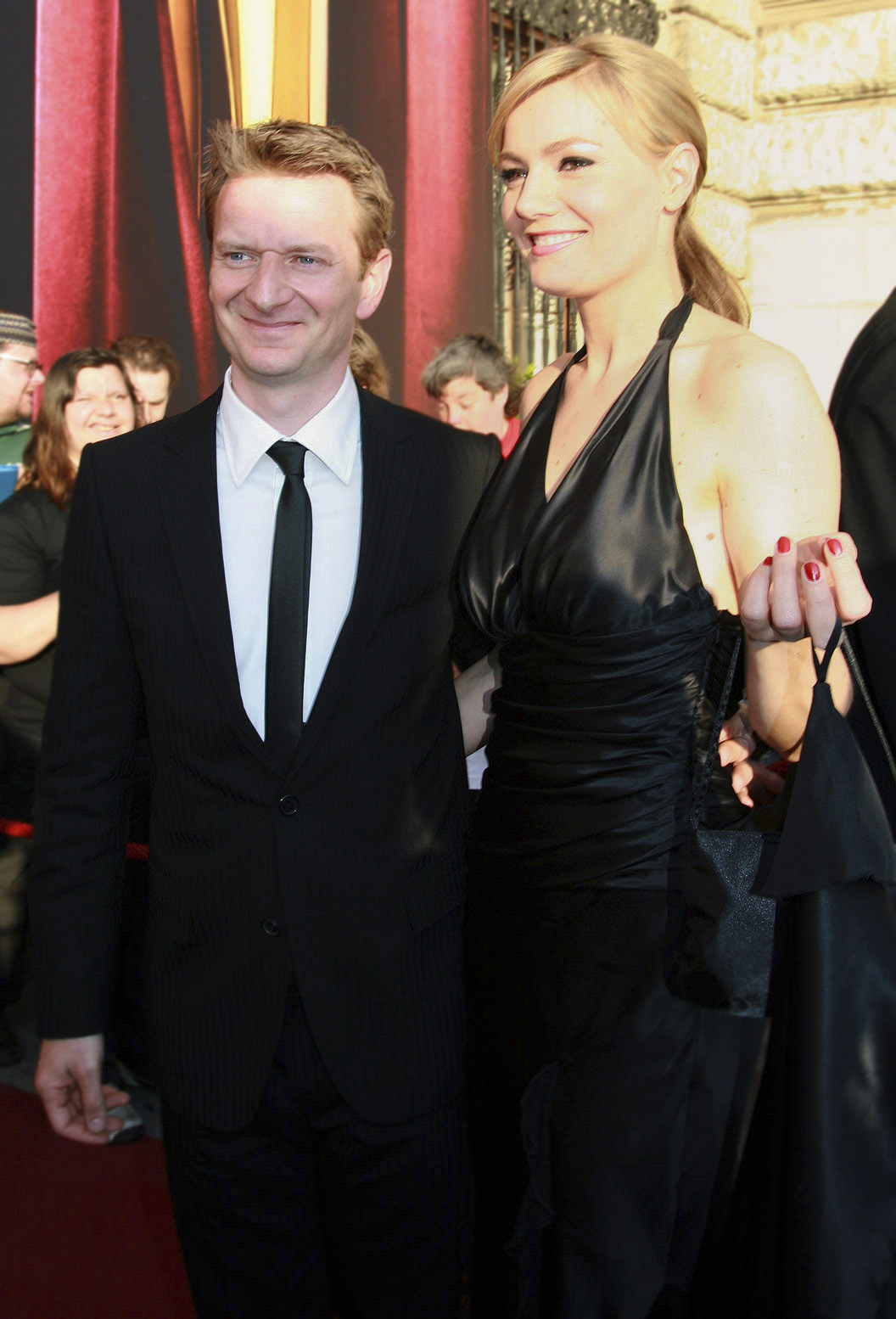
Kessler and Martina Hill in 2009

Kessler has been working for television since 1992. Among the productions he participated are Siebenbirken, Schwarz greift ein, Das Schicksal der Woche, Hotel Mama 1-3, Sonntags geöffnet, The Last Courier, Sophie, Callboy, Kommissare Südwest, St. Angela, Ein Fall für zwei, Großstadtrevier, Tatort, Der kleine Mönch, SK Kölsch, Das Leben der Philosophen, and Cologne P.D.

He has starred in the comedy series Kesslers Knigge.

=== Comedy ===
From 1999 to 2000, Kessler was a cast member of Switch. From 2001 to 2002, he was part of the Wochenshow cast. Afterwards, he appeared on Axel!, Urmel aus dem Eis, Ladyland, and Pastewka. He became a regular on Schillerstraße since its first episode in 2004. Additionally, he took part in the game show Genial daneben and in ProSieben Märchenstunde ("ProSieben Fairy Tale Hour") in the episodes Rotkäppchen ("Little Red Riding Hood"), Froschkönig ("The Frog Prince") and Aschenputtel ("Cinderella").

In October 2006 Kessler became the driver and host of RBB Fernsehen's Berliner Nacht Taxe ("Berlin Night Taxi"). "I want to have the unaltered stories of the night", he stated. "We're going to meet authentic people. That's no talk theater with cast actors." A total of 42 episodes were broadcast between 2006 and 2009.

In 2007 and 2008, he became a cast member of Switch Reloaded and started working on his own TV show.

=== Voice acting ===
Kessler has had a couple of voice acting roles. These are Rattlesnake Jake in Rango and Hackus in The Smurfs 2.
