= Kesslers Knigge =

German comedy series

- Genre: Comedy / Satire
- Starring: Michael Kessler; Christine Sommer; Martin Klempnow; Oliver Unkel; Caroline Frier
- Opening theme: "Nur ein Wort" by Wir sind Helden
- Country of origin: Germany
- Original language: German
- No. of seasons: 1
- No. of episodes: 10

Production
- Running time: 25 minutes

Original release
- Network: Sat.1
- Release: 19 June 2009

Kesslers Knigge ("Kessler's Etiquette") is a German comedy series starring Michael Kessler as himself. The first season was broadcast from June to August 2009; production for another season remained undecided.

== Format ==
In each episode, Kessler demonstrates negative examples of etiquette, which may not be suitable in daily life situations. Each episode has three segments; every episode focuses on a topic such as the office, holidays, or the dead. Kessler begins each segment with a satirical smile. Each segment begins with the text "10 things that you should not do if ... (such as "...you are at the travel agency")". The theme tune of the series is the instrumental version of "Nur ein Wort" by Wir sind Helden.

== Production ==
The episodes were produced in just two months in the autumn of 2008. The series was directed by Jan Markus Linhof and Joseph Orr.

== Running gags ==
Sketches that are shown often (adapted to the respective topic):

- Kessler begins to sing off-key while the other persons plug their ears, and jangles on a guitar.
- Kessler shouts "Boring!" in inappropriate situations, for example when a kid recites a poem in school.
- Kessler imitates an Orc from the computer game "World of Warcraft" and often shouts, "On to Draenor!"
- Kessler drives a double wheel (Rhönrad) in various locations, for example in a men's room.
- Kessler dresses up as a school girl, who is always sucking on a lollipop.
- Kessler gets a pizza delivered to inappropriate locations, for example into an operating room.
