= Opel Manta =

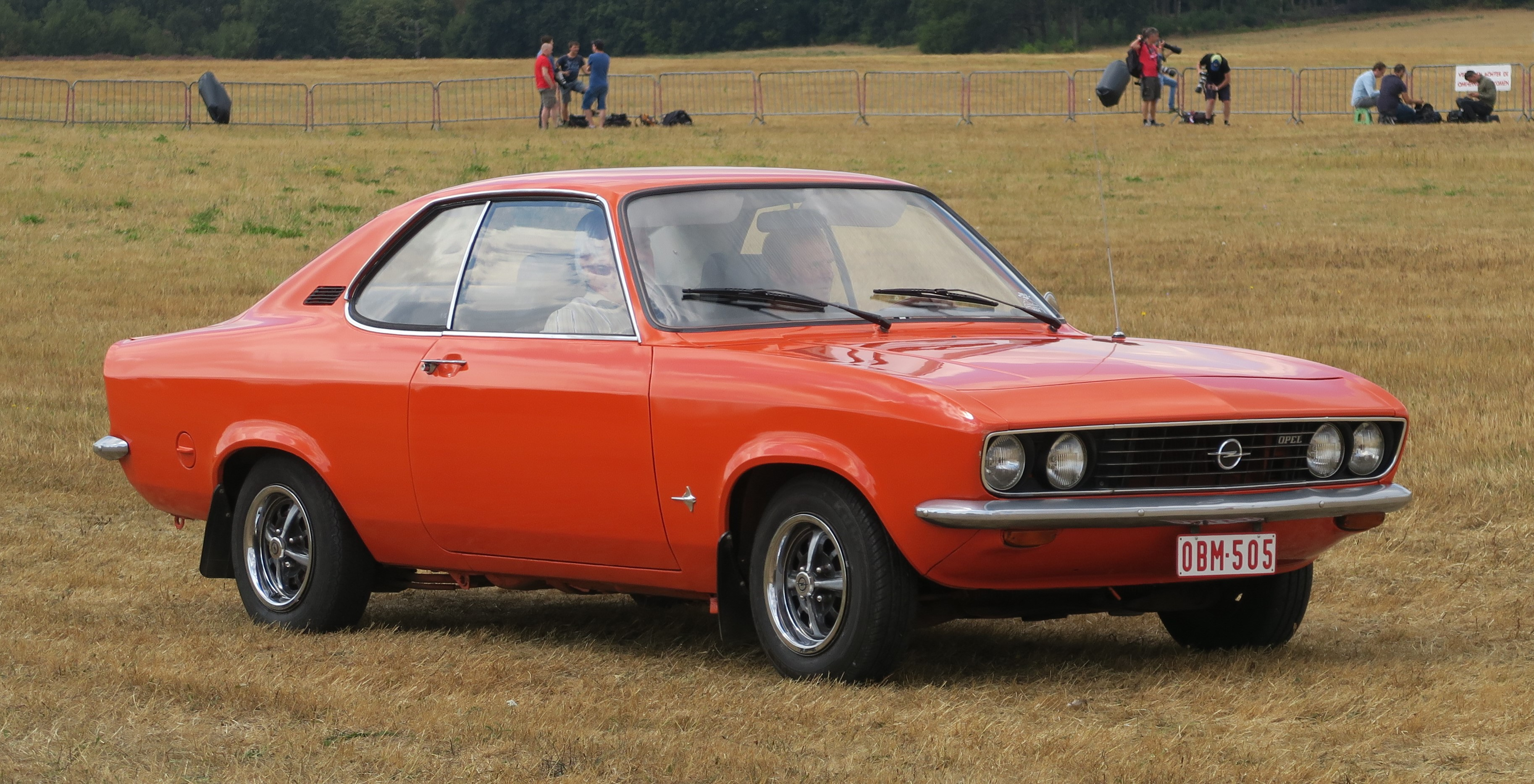

Overview
- Manufacturer: Opel
- Production: 1970–1988
- Assembly: Germany: Rüsselsheim

Body and chassis
- Class: Sports car

Chronology
- Successor: Opel Calibra

The Opel Manta is a car which was built by German manufacturer Opel in two generations from 1970 to 1988. The Manta was a mildly sporting coupé based on the Ascona family car, competing with cars such as the Ford Capri. The Manta remained rear-wheel drive for both generations and also saw certain competition success. Its name comes from the manta ray. The first generation only has a two-door body style, whilst the second generation added a three-door hatchback alongside the two-door variant.

== Manta A (1970–1975) ==
Manta A
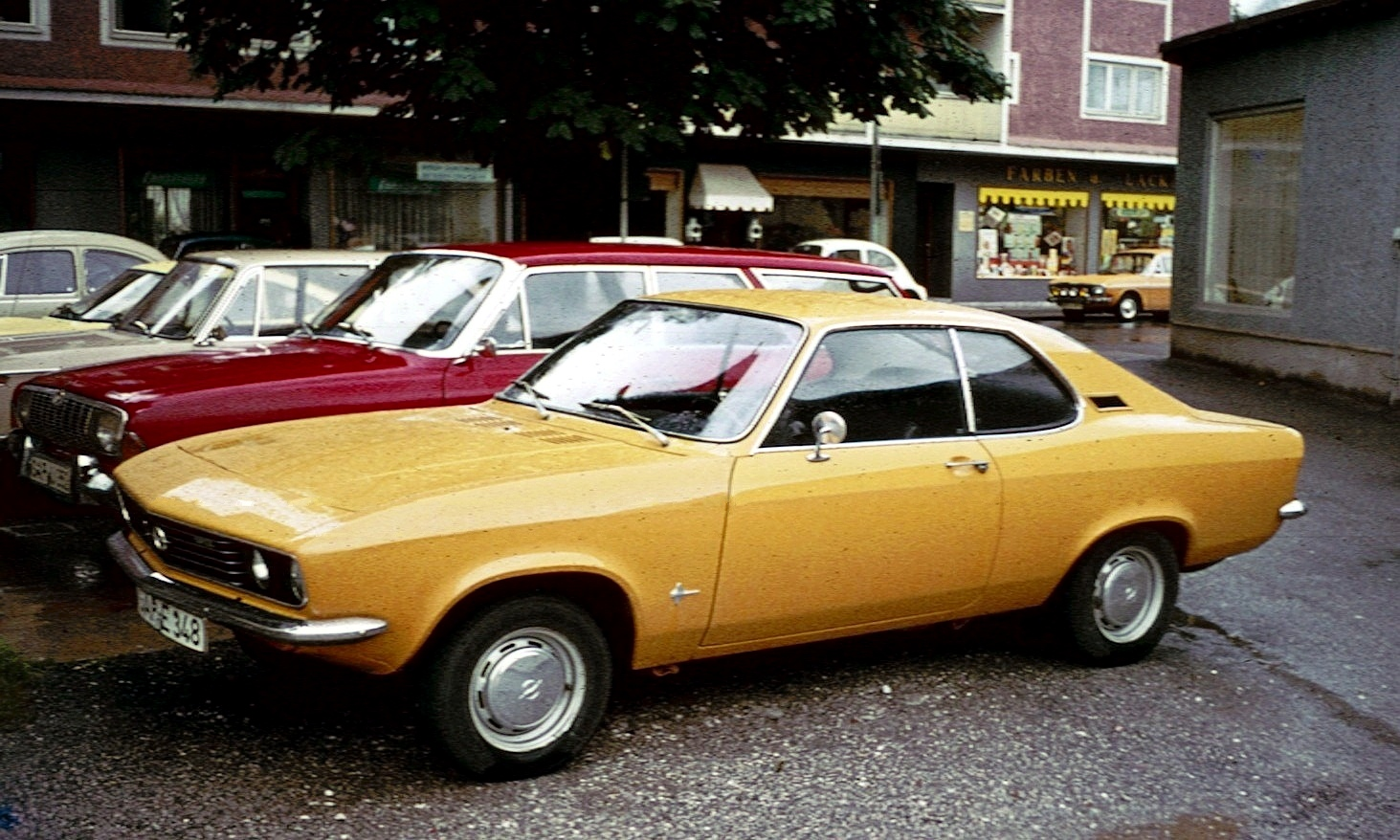

Overview
- Also called: Opel 1900 Sport Coupé (US, 1971–1972)
- Production: 1970–1975
- Designer: Chuck Jordan

Body and chassis
- Body style: 2-door coupé

Powertrain
- Engine: 1.2 L 12S OHV I4; 1.6 L 16N/16S CIH I4; 1.9 L 19S/19E CIH I4
- Transmission: 4-speed manual 3-speed automatic

Dimensions
- Wheelbase: 95.75 in (2,432 mm)
- Length: 168.75 in (4,286 mm)
- Width: 64 in (1,600 mm)
- Height: 53 in (1,300 mm)
- Curb weight: 970 kg (2,138 lb)

Chronology
- Successor: Opel Manta B (Germany/Europe); Opel Isuzu (US)

The Manta A was released in September 1970, two months ahead of the then new Opel Ascona on which it was based. A competitor to the Ford Capri, it was a two-door "three-box" coupé, and featured distinctive round tail lights, quite similar to those on the Opel GT and which in fact were used on the GT in 1973, its final model year. It took its name, and a few minor styling cues, from the Manta Ray concept car (1961), which also famously influenced the 1968 Chevrolet Corvette C3 (both Chevrolet and Opel had General Motors as their parent company). 498,553 Manta As were built from 1970 until 1975.

In the UK market, the first Manta was sold only as an Opel: there was no Vauxhall-branded Manta (or Ascona) until after the launch, in 1975, of the Manta B1 and Ascona B as the Mark 1 Cavalier coupe and sports hatch (Manta) and saloon (Ascona). The Vauxhall and Opel models were subsequently sold side by side. (In the UK the Ford Capri niche was contested, with only limited success, by Vauxhall's Firenza, based on the ageing Vauxhall Viva until 1975.)

The Manta was normally equipped with a 1.6 or a 1.9-litre CIH engine, although in continental Europe, a small, 1.2-litre, motor was also offered. In the United States, only the largest, 1.9-litre, engine was offered. The Manta came with either a four-speed manual or a three-speed TH-180 automatic. The Manta went on to win a large number of rallies in Europe and the United States.

The European market had a number of different versions. Most were basic trim packages, the most popular being the "Berlinetta", which was similar to the Luxus but included rubber trim on the bumpers (standard on all 1973 US Opel Mantas), vinyl roof, and other miscellaneous features. The one exception was the 1975 Opel, which offered the GT/E and a number of special editions based on the GT/E. The GT/E was a fuel-injected version of the European 1.9 L and the performance figures were very impressive for the time. The most notable special editions models based on the GT/E were the "Black Magic" (with black and plaid interior) and the "Swinger" edition in white with red stripes and a bright red fabric interior.

| Engine | | Power | | | Torque | | | dates | notes |
| name | displacement | PS | kW | /rpm | Nm | lb⋅ft | /rpm | dates | notes |
|---|---|---|---|---|---|---|---|---|---|
| 12S | 1196 cc I4 | 60 | 44 | 5400 | 88 | 65 | 3000 | 1972–1975 | |
| 16N | 1584 cc I4 | 68 | 50 | 5200 | 108 | 80 | 3400 | 1970–1975 | |
| 16S | 1584 cc I4 | 80 | 59 | 5200 | 118 | 87 | 3800 | 1970–1975 | |
| 19S | 1897 cc I4 | 90 | 66 | 5100 | 145 | 107 | 3600 | 1971–1975 | |
| 19S | 1897 cc I4 | 90 (Note: SAE net horsepower) | 67 | 5200 | 150 | 111 | 3400 | 1971–1972 (Note: Model year(s)) | USA |
| 19S | 1897 cc I4 | 75 | 56 | 4800 | 125 | 92 | 3400 | 1973–1974 | USA |
| 19E | 1897 cc I4 | 105 | 77 | 5400 | 153 | 113 | 4200 | 1974–1975 | |
| 19E | 1897 cc I4 | 81; 77 | 60; 57 | 5000 | 130; 129 | 96; 95 | 2200 | 1975 | 49-state California |

=== US market ===
The sales approach for the Opel line in the US market differed from Europe. The Manta A was one of only a few Opel models sold in the US, where it was introduced in late October 1970 for the 1971 model year. Opels were imported by GM and sold through Buick dealerships and not their own dealership network, so they were limited in what makes and models they could sell there. Other Opel models sold in the US were Rekord P1 and Rekord P2 (1956–1961), Kadett A (1964–1966), Kadett B (1967–1971), GT (1968–1973), and the Manta / Ascona A (1971–1975). The Ascona A was the saloon version on the Manta A chassis and was sold in the US under the "1900" name as a two- and four-door saloon, and as a two-door "sport wagon". The only differences between the Ascona and Manta were exterior sheet metal, glass and trim. The frame, mechanics, dash, front seats, and many other parts were shared between the cars. The Manta was even sold as the "1900 Sport Coupé" or "1900 Rallye" in 1971 and 1972, rather than as the "Manta". In 1973, the "Manta" nameplate was added to US-spec Mantas, but the Asconas kept the 1900 badge throughout their model life. The last year GM imported European-made Opels into the United States under the Opel marque was 1975. In that year the only Opels imported were the Manta and Ascona A.

All Mantas sold in the US had the 1.9 L and larger heavy duty radiator (an option on European models). There was also a sport model known as the "Rallye" from 1971 to 1974. The Rallye model was, overall, an appearance and gauge package, the most noticeable difference being the addition of a black hood, and on 1970–1973 models, fog lamps. Mechanically, the only difference was the rear axle ratios in the models with manual transmissions, and the Rallye model came with standard stiffer suspension, a tighter turning radius, and very aggressive front caster adjustments. Both had rear sway bars and a Panhard rod, providing exceptional handling.

In 1973 and 1974 there was also the "Luxus" model, which included refinements like corduroy seats, colour-coded interiors (blue or burgundy), and faux wood panelling. The only special edition Manta ever produced for the US market was the "Blue Max", in 1973. This amounted to a blue 1973 Luxus model, with a unique dark blue vinyl roof, mechanical sunroof, and automatic transmission. As emissions regulations were introduced, the Manta's engine was gradually becoming detuned. Originally, the 1.9 produced the same 90 hp (66 kW) as the European models, but beginning with model year 1973 in the US, the 1.9 liter cam in head produced only 75 hp (56 kW) from a low 7.2 to 1 compression ratio. Sales were dropping as the car's performance no longer matched its looks, nor its price. As a project, Car & Driver magazine added a turbocharger which effectively boosted the low compression ratio.

For the 1975 model year, all Manta and 1900 models were equipped with Bosch L-Jetronic fuel injection systems in the United States due to emission regulations. Yet in Europe, this feature was only available on the high-end GT/E models, which also sported fog lamps and lower front spoilers, which were not offered on any of the US-spec Manta models. Also, the 1974–75 Manta models had large aluminium 5 mph (8 km/h) bumpers to comply with US crash standards of the time; European Mantas did not receive the large bumpers.

With the Deutsche mark becoming stronger, and with other costs also rising, US imports of Opels ended in 1975. Instead, the Isuzu Gemini version of the T-car was imported from Japan and sold by Buick dealers as the "Opel by Isuzu", and later, "Buick Opel". The "Opel" name was last used in the US in 1979.

=== Turbomanta ===
The Turbomanta is the rarer of the two special Mantas which entered limited production. Production was a total of 33 cars, with five of them being prototypes and the other ones used for public relations.

The Turbomanta was actually a 1973 SR with a 1.9-litre "S" spec engine, originally putting out 90 bhp (67 kW). The British company Broadspeed was chosen to build the turbo cars, and eventually started building five left-hand drive cars for the German Opel AG. These cars were meant only as prototypes. Broadspeed came up with a somewhat special solution, and used a combination of a Holset 3LDG turbocharger, and a carburettor mounted inside a big plenum chamber. The engine itself was fitted with a thicker copper head gasket, and as such the compression ratio was lowered to 7.6:1. The outcome was a 1.9-litre engine which generated 156 bhp (116 kW), with acceleration from 0–60 mph (97 km/h) in 7.6 seconds. All five cars were in GM's "signalgelb" sunflower yellow, and had large black stripes on the side, where a sign said "Turbomanta". The downside to this was fuel consumption. The turbocharger had halved the economy of the car, and building it was also costly. Therefore, Opel closed the project, leaving the five cars as the total production number. However a British engineer at the Dealer Opel Team (D.O.T.), which was the British importer and builder of Opel cars in Britain, was so enthusiastic about the cars that he had D.O.T. build an additional 28 cars. The cars were all based on the 1974 luxury Berlinetta model, with full gauge packs, automatic transmissions, and alloy wheels. All 28 cars were black with vinyl roofing. The only thing identifying that the car was indeed a Turbomanta was a small sign at the rear quarter of the rear wings saying "turbo". Very few of these cars still remain today.

=== TE 2800 ===
The TE2800 was a totally different project that Opel refused to endorse. A Belgian company called Transeurop Engineering also wanted to increase the engine power of the Manta A and installed the 2.8-litre CIH inline-six from the Commodore in a Manta in 1971. Transeurop entered the car in the 1971 Tour of Belgium (part of the European Rally Championship; driver Chris Tuerlinx finished in seventh place). Opel had also tried the six-cylinder engine layout in 1971 and 1972 but with no success. The cars were deemed too expensive to build, and the market was oversaturated with big-engined cars at the time.

Transeurop Engineering did not agree, and a Commodore 2.8GS engine was fitted into the engine bay of the Manta 1.9SR. The radiator, the bonnet, the front engine supports and part of the front section, the rear axle, and the transmission all needed to be changed. Transeurop Engineering turned to the then foremost Opel tuner, Steinmetz, who supplied a new fibreglass bonnet with a large bulge on it to make room for the engine, a set of widened arches, and a special front bumper integrated with the lower front spoiler, all to make room for the changes that needed to be made to the car's front end construction. Much of the front was cut out and replaced with other parts being mounted further to the ground in order to give room for the radiator. A closed radiator system was installed so that the radiator had a water tank in the engine bay (like modern cars). Originally, Opel and General Motors Continental (GM's Belgian subsidiary) was to supply the Manta bodies and engines for the conversion, but by the time the first production TE2800s were completed in 1973 the energy crisis had struck and the management of both Opel and General Motors Continental had changed. Planned production levels had been five cars per day originally; in the end a total of 79 cars were made and sold through Steinmetz in Germany, branded not as Opels but as TE2800s. Opel did not want the Opel brand on the cars and all Opel badging was removed from the cars and replaced by the "TE" logo.

The Commodore GS engine was fitted with two Zenith carburettors; this version was chosen in preference to the fuel injected GS/E engine due to its lower cost and complexity, while being easier to tune to meet various emissions requirements. The output was 142 PS (104 kW), and with the Commodore four-speed manual gearbox and a 3.18:1 rear axle the car went from 0–60 mph (97 km/h) in 7.6 seconds. Top speed was quoted as 207 km/h (129 mph). A five-speed ZF manual transmission was offered as an option. Transeurop/Steinmetz also offered a tune-up for rally and motorsport use. The tuning consisted of porting and flowing the head, a higher compression ratio, a race spec camshaft, and triple carburettors, giving the car up to 230 PS (169 kW). This was only offered in combination with the five-speed manual. Some of the engine tuning parts were also available on the road car.

Although the TE2800 is the fastest Manta A ever made, it is not officially an Opel. It could outrun cars like the 911 Carrera of 1973 and the BMW 2002 turbo from 1973, even though those cars had more engine power and cost about twice as much. The low weight of the Manta bodyshell and the combination of the right gear ratios was what gave the car its success. However, the cars were very expensive, almost twice the price of a 105 PS (77 kW) GT/E in 1975. Very few still exist today, as most were used in rally and motorsport events.

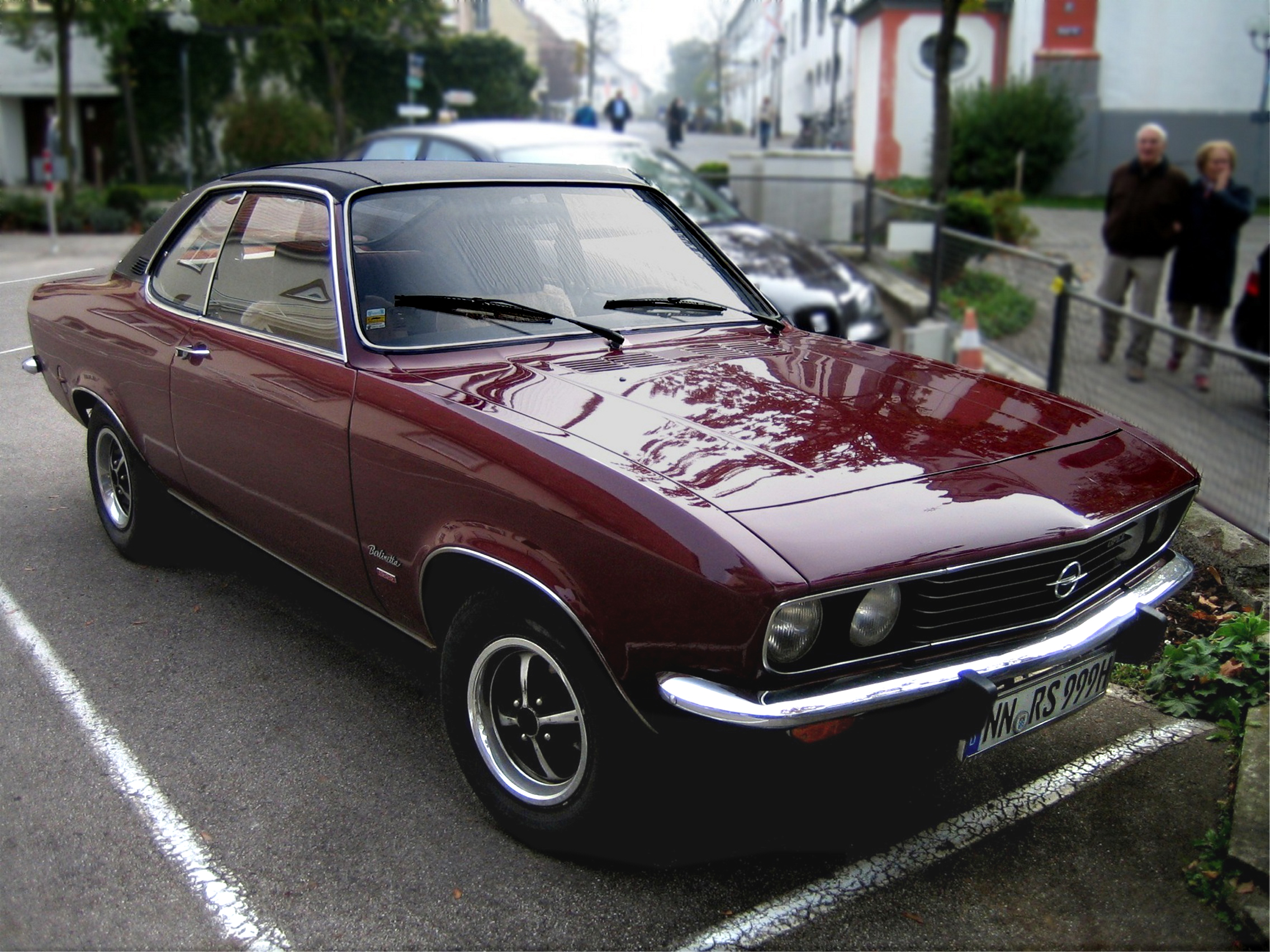
Opel Manta A

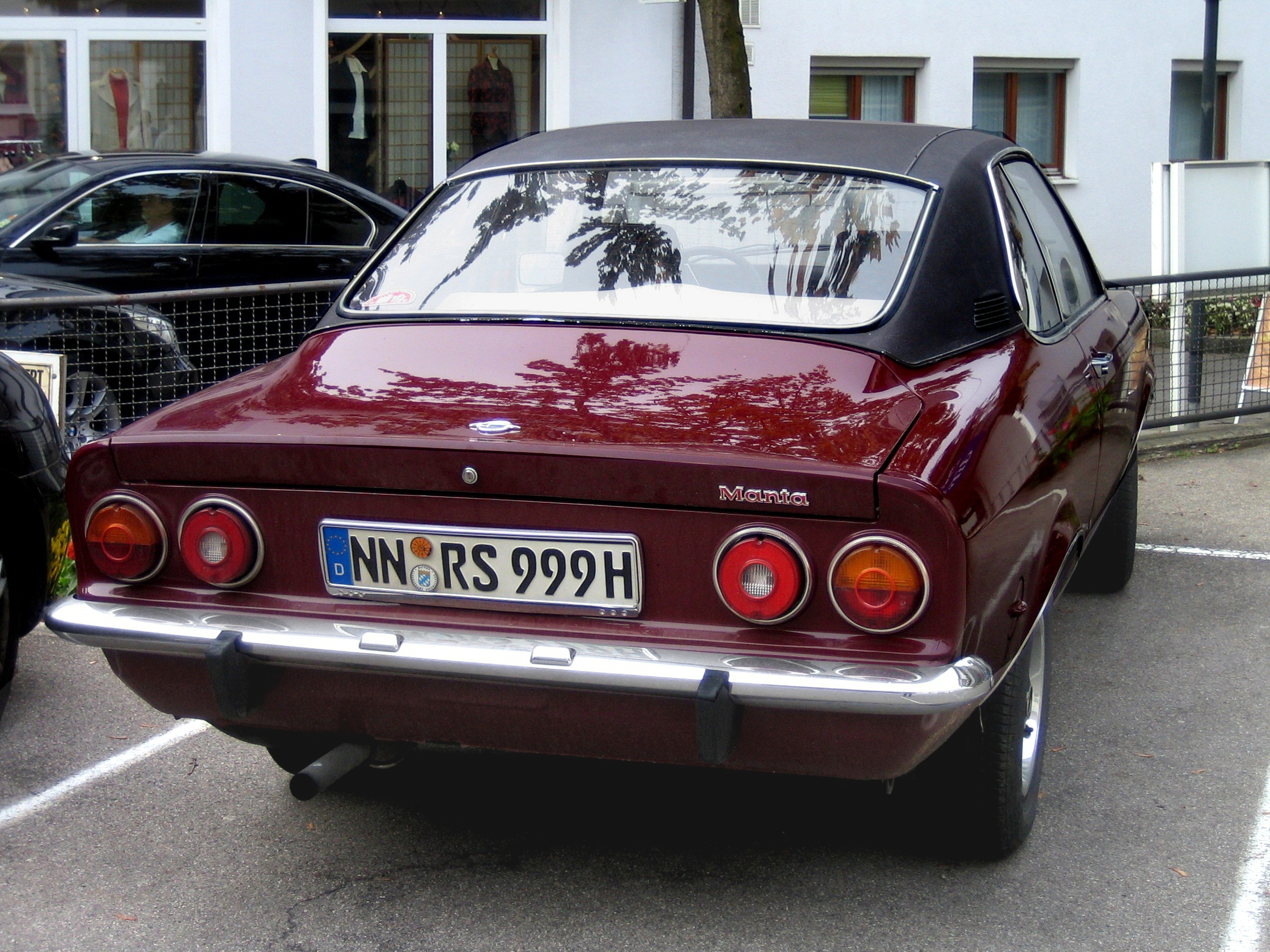
Opel Manta A

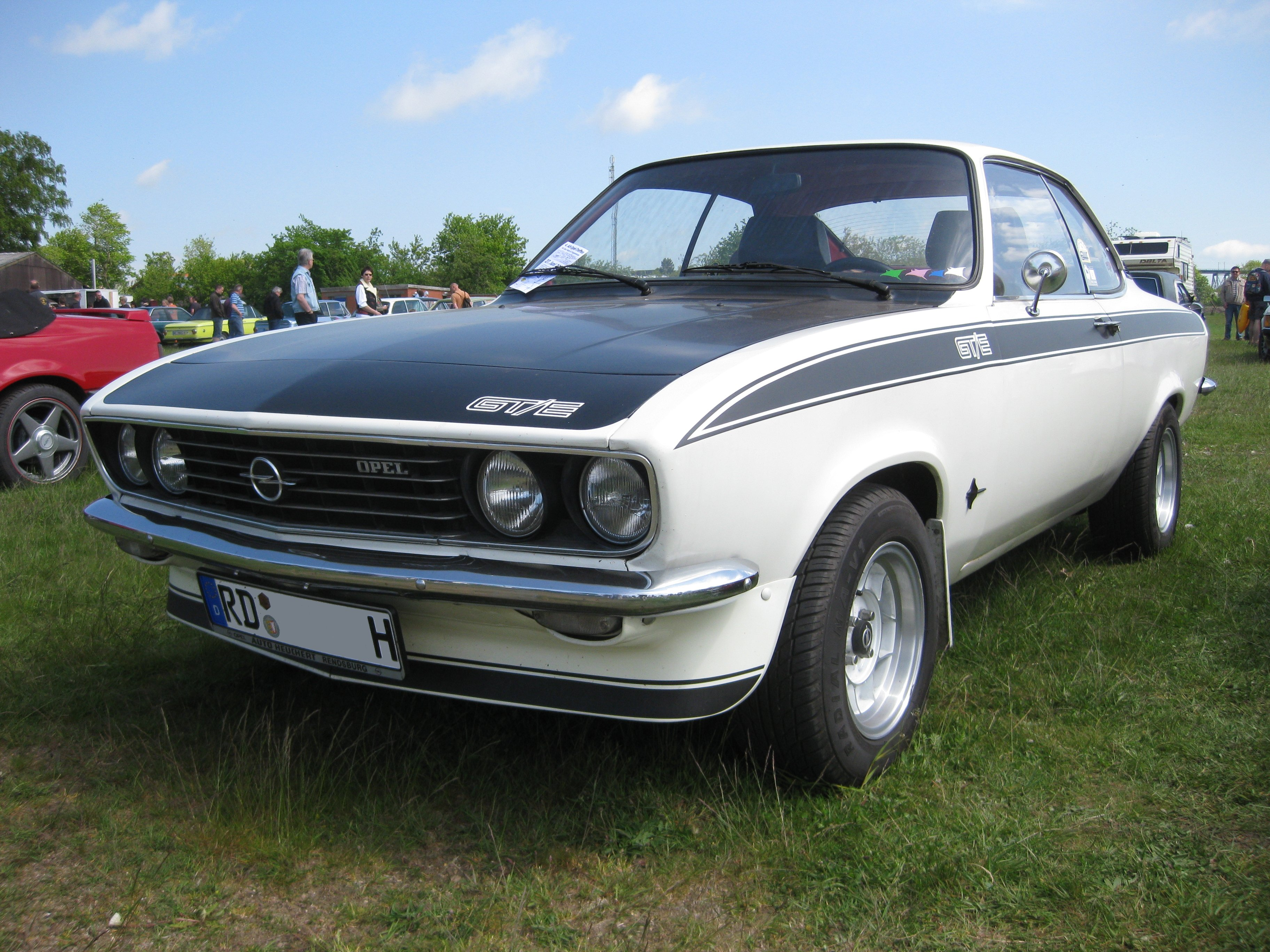
Opel Manta GT/E (1974–1975)

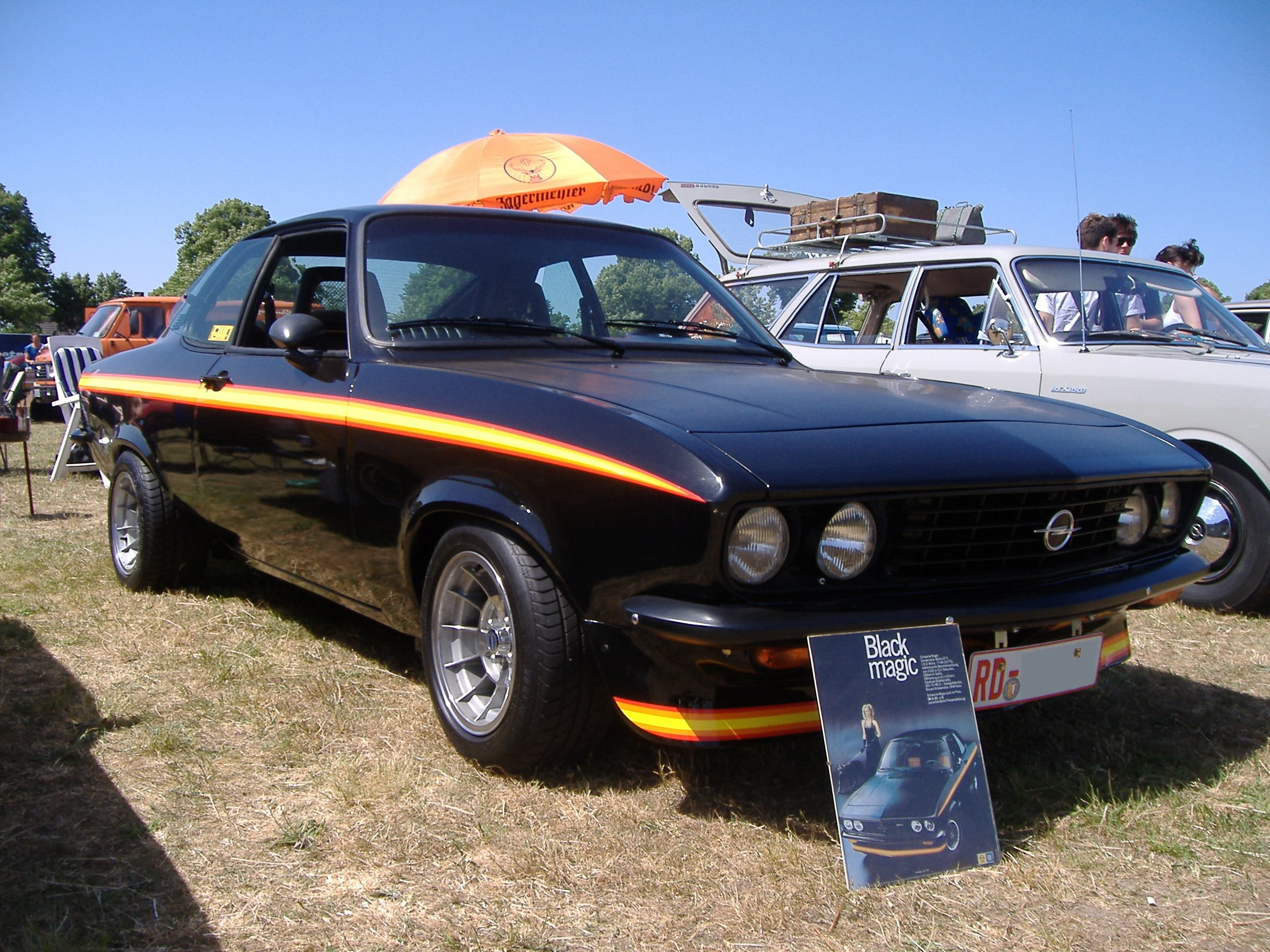
Opel Manta "Black Magic" (1975)

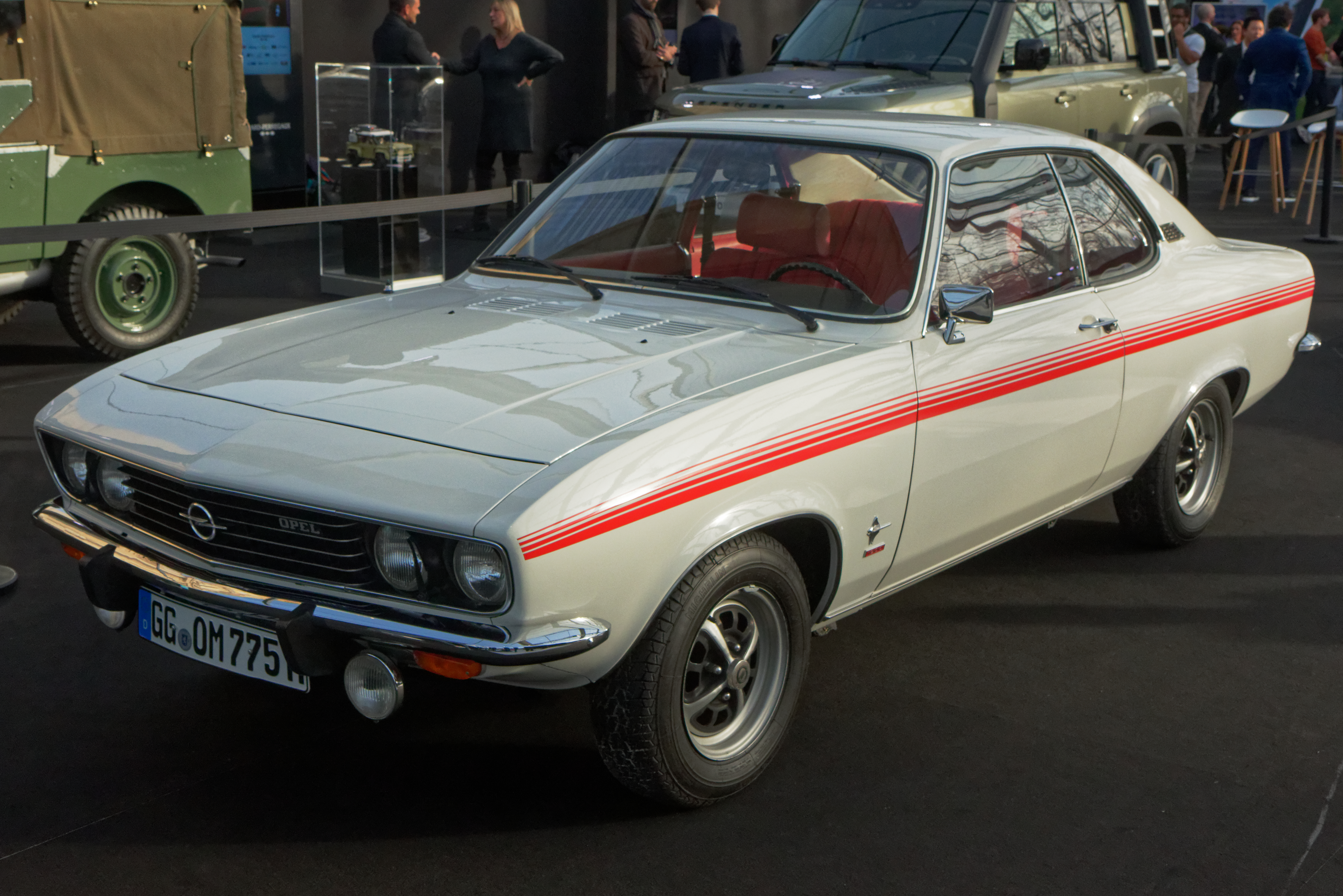
Opel Manta "Swinger"

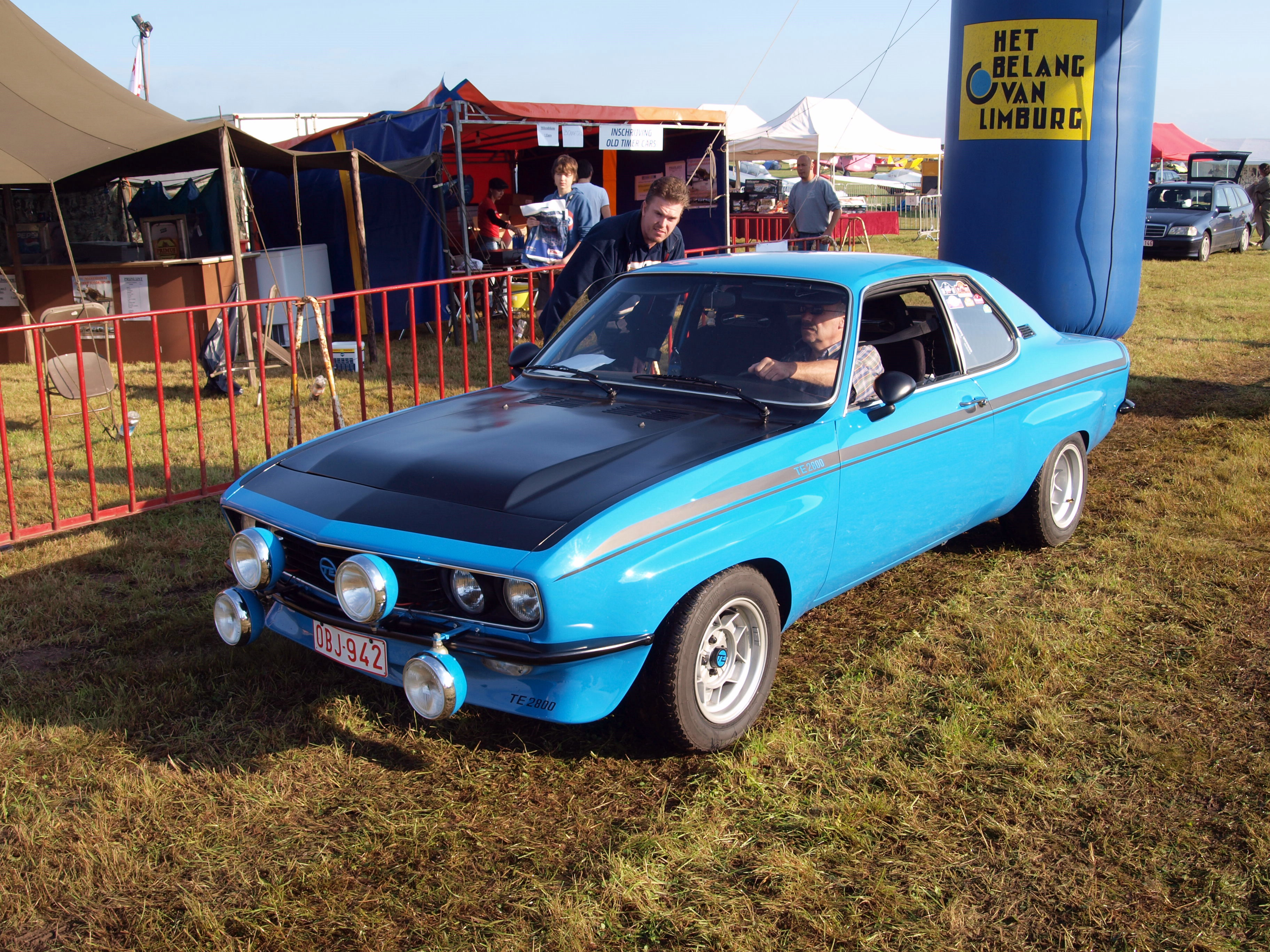
Opel/Steinmetz/Transeurop TE2800

== Manta B (1975–1988) ==
Manta B
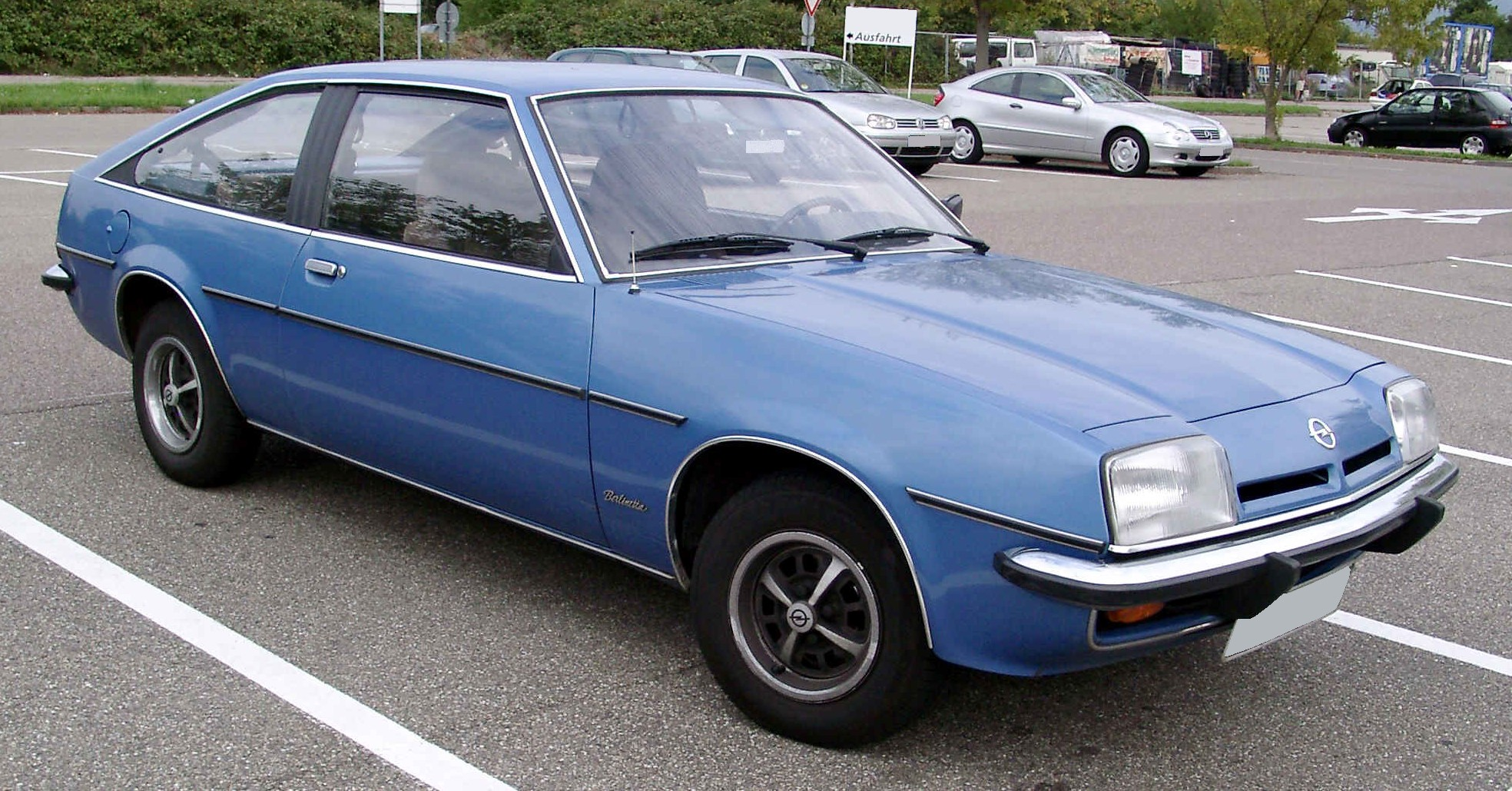

Overview
- Also called: Vauxhall Cavalier Sports Hatch and Coupe (UK)
- Production: 1975–1988
- Designer: Hideo Kodama

Body and chassis
- Body style: 2-door coupé 3-door hatchback

Powertrain
- Engine: 1.2 L 12S OHV I4; 1.3 L 13N/13S OHC I4; 1.6 L 16N/16S CIH I4; 1.8 L E18NV I4; 1.9 L 19N/19S/19E CIH I4; 2.0 L 20N/20S/20E CIH I4
- Transmission: 4/5-speed manual 3-speed automatic

Dimensions
- Wheelbase: 2,518 mm (99.1 in)
- Length: Coupé: 4,445 mm (175.0 in); CC: 4,384 mm (172.6 in)
- Width: B: 1,670 mm (65.7 in); B2: 1,686 mm (66.4 in)
- Height: 1,330 mm (52.4 in)
- Curb weight: 965–1,095 kg (2,127–2,414 lb)

The second car to use the Manta name was launched in August 1975. This two-door "three-box" car was mechanically based directly on the then newly redesigned Opel Ascona, but the overall design was influenced by the 1975 Chevrolet Monza. The Manta had more "sporty" styling, including a droop-snoot nose not seen on the Ascona, which was similar to the UK equivalent of the Ascona, the Cavalier Mk1. The Vauxhall equivalent of the Manta was the Cavalier Mk1 Sports Hatch and Cavalier Mk1 Coupe. Up until 1981, Vauxhall models were sold in continental Europe alongside Opel in 11 countries, resulting in the Vauxhall Cavalier Mk1 Sports Hatch and Coupe, as well as the saloon equivalent of the Ascona B, competing against each other.

Available engines included the small 1.2-litre OHV engine, the 1.6-litre CIH and the 1.9-litre CIH. Also in 1976, the GT/E engine from the Manta A series was adapted into the Manta B programme spawning the GT/E Manta B series. In 1979 the GT/E had the engine replaced with the new 2.0-litre CIH and Bosch L-Jetronic injection system. Power output was now 110 PS (81 kW). The 1.9-litre engine gave way to the 2.0 litre S engine which was aspirated by a Varajet II carburettor. This engine was the most used engine by Opel at the time, and was to be found in several Opel Rekord cars as well. Opel also offered a dealer-installed tuning kit for the fuel-injected engine, promising at least 125 PS (92 kW) thanks to a modified camshaft, valve lifters, and exhaust system.

The B series Manta had 165R13 tyres on 5" wide or 185/70R13 tyres on 5.5" or 6" wide 13" wheels.

In 1977, a three-door hatchback version appeared to complement the existing two-door booted car. This shape was also not unique, being available on the Vauxhall Cavalier Sports Hatch variant.

=== Facelift (B2) ===
Both Manta versions received a facelift in 1982, which included a plastic front spoiler, sideskirts for the GT/E and GSi models, a small wing at the rear and quadruple air intakes on the grille. Also the 1.2-, 1.6- and 1.9-litre engines were discontinued and replaced by the 1.3-litre OHC engine, the 1.8-litre OHC and the 2.0-litre S and E CIH engines (although the 75 PS 1.9N continued to be available in a few markets). The GT/E was renamed and was called the GSi from 1983 (except in the UK where the GT/E name continued). Manta GSi had 195/60R14 tyres on 6" wide 14" aluminium wheels.

Production of the Manta continued well after the equivalent Ascona and Cavalier were replaced by a front-wheel-drive model "Ascona C". The Vauxhall Cavalier Mk1 Sports Hatch and Coupe did not continue past 1981, and there were no coupe versions in the MK2 Cavalier range. In 1982 the 1.8-litre Family II engine from the Ascona C was fitted in the Manta B (replacing the CIH unit) making a more economical Manta B to drive. It could run 14 km per litre (7.1 L/100 km consumption) and use unleaded fuel. The 1.8 was very popular and was in production for 5 years (1982–1987). The 2.0S models where discontinued in 1984 and only the GSi was available with the "large" engine (GT/E in the UK). In 1986 Opel released the last Manta B model the Exclusive (1987 in the UK), giving it all of the best in equipment. Recaro seats with red cloth, grey leather like interior and the full bodypack known from the i200 models. This consisted of twin round headlights in a plastic cover, front spoiler and rear lower spoiler from Irmscher, sideskirts and the known three-piece rear spoiler of the Manta 400 (producing 80 kg (176 lb) of weight on the rear at 200 km/h). In the UK, the Exclusive GT/E models were available in colours such as Dolphin Grey with matching dark grey cloth seats with red piping. These also had the quad headlights, front spoiler but a rear bumper which housed the number plate, coupled with a black plastic strip between the rear light clusters. The rear spoiler was similar to the standard GT/E. Opel finally ceased the production of the Manta B in 1988, only producing the GSi version after 1986 (it was sold as the GT/E in the UK). Its successor, the Calibra - sold as a Vauxhall in Britain, and as an Opel everywhere else - was launched in 1989.

General Motors had decided in 1986 to develop a direct replacement for the Manta, despite a dip in popularity for affordable coupes and sports cars (possibly due to the rising popularity of "hot hatchbacks" like the Volkswagen Golf GTI) which even resulted in Ford deciding not to directly replace the once hugely popular Capri on its demise that year. However, Japanese products like the Honda Prelude and Toyota Celica were enjoying a rise in popularity at this time, while Audi had done well in this sector since launching the Coupé/Quattro in 1980, and Volkswagen had also achieved strong sales of its second generation Scirocco (launched in 1981).

Today, these cars are hard to find in an original, good condition; consequently the value has risen considerably over the last few years.

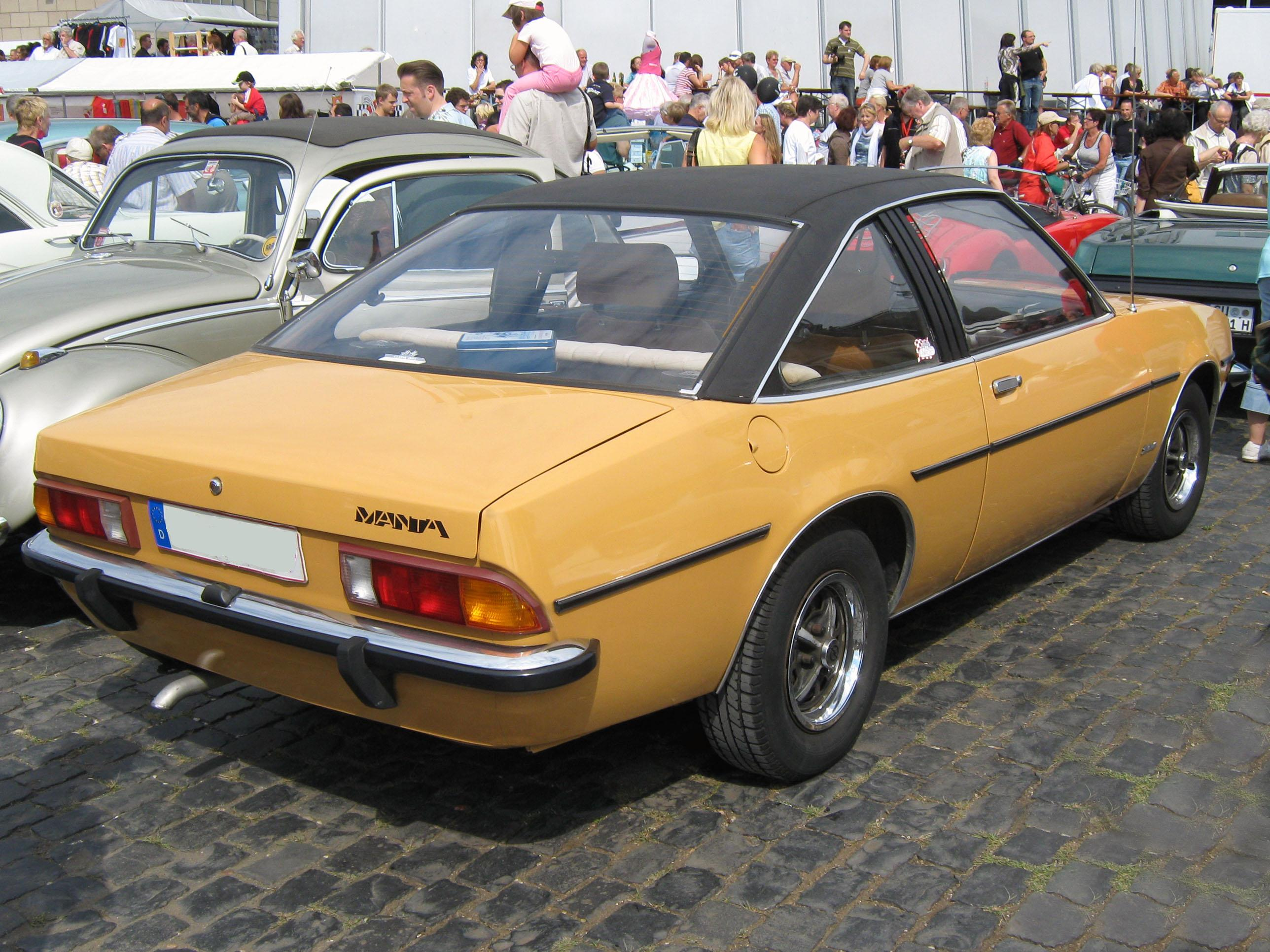
Pre-facelift Opel Manta B

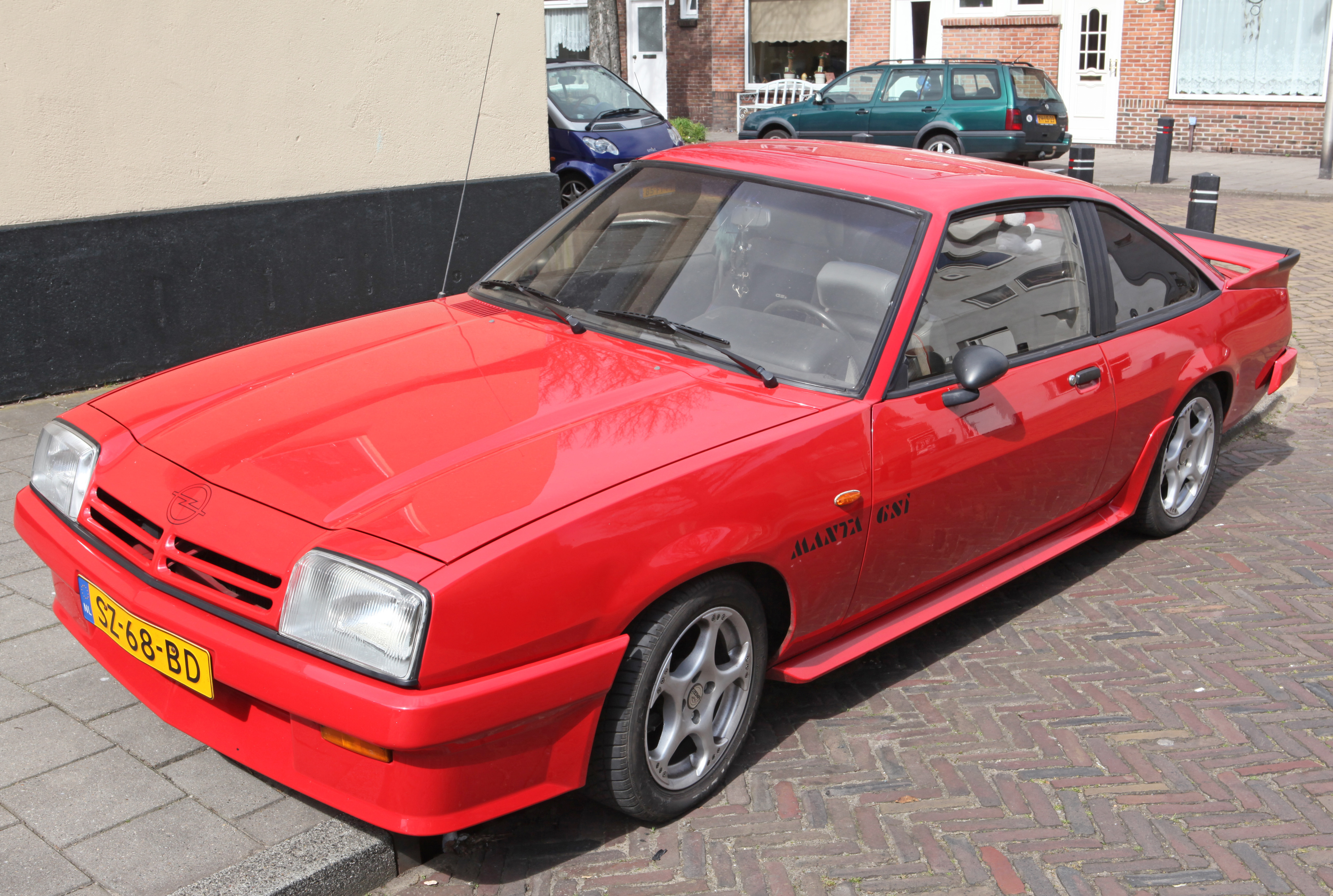
Post-facelift Opel Manta GSI (front)

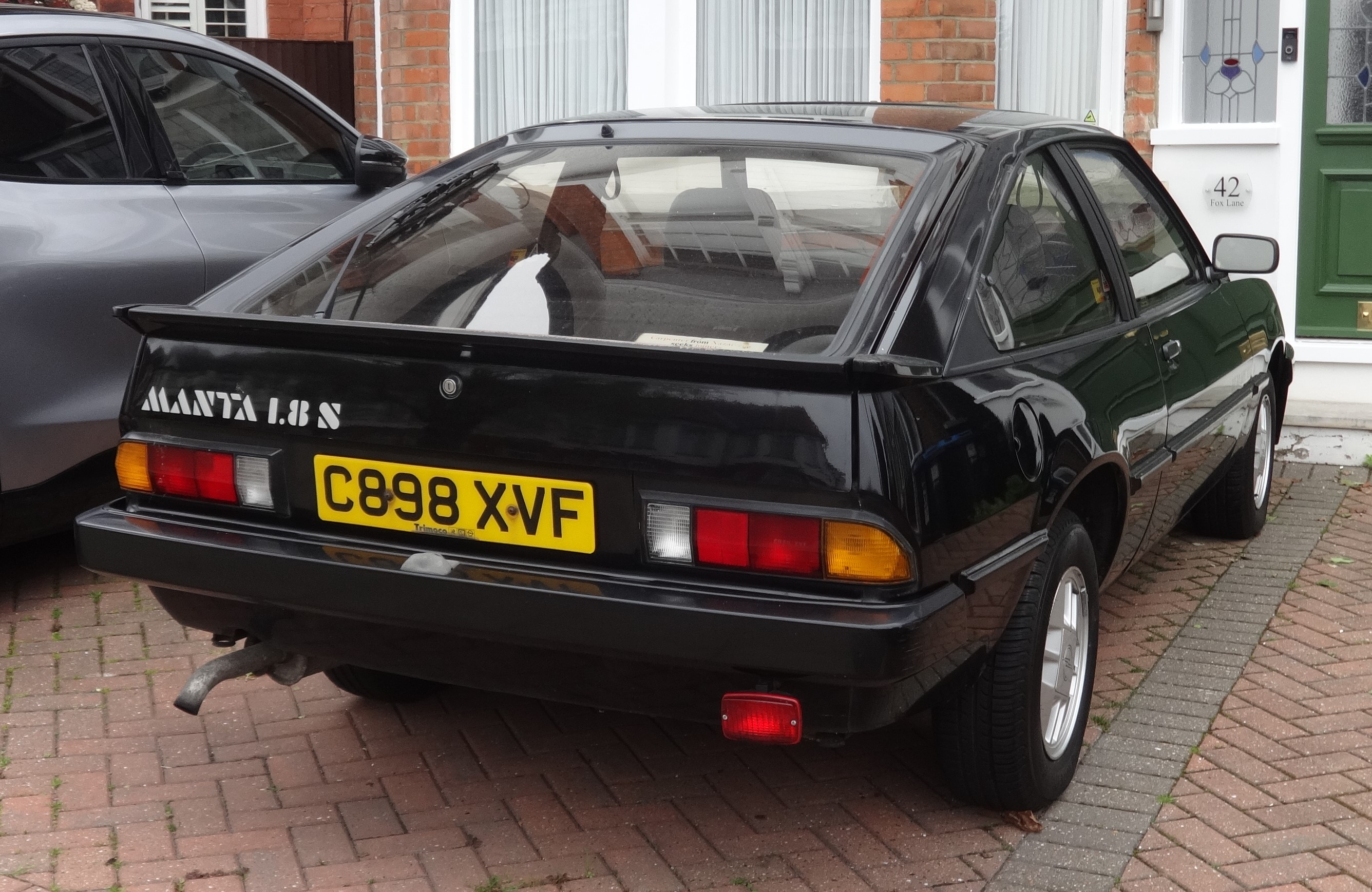
Post-facelift Opel Manta S (rear)

=== Rally and special versions ===
In 1979 work began on a rally-spec Opel. Both the Ascona B and the Manta B were used for this. The Ascona 400 model was the more successful of the two, largely due to better weight distribution.

Opel joined forces with German tuner Irmscher and Cosworth in Britain, to make the 400. Cosworth was given the task to develop a 16-valve 2-cam head for the CIH spec engine block, and Irmscher who earlier in 1977 and 78 had proven that they knew their way around an Opel building the i2800, was to design the exterior and interior of the cars. The results were not bad. Opel however had problems with the engine. The first idea of using a 2.0-litre engine and then using the 16-valve head from Cosworth simply did not give enough power. The problem was that the heads had already been built, so the heads were made to fit on the CIH type 4-cylinder engine block. So they built an unusual engine using a 2.0-litre engine block and a forged crankshaft with an 85 mm (3.35 in) stroke and ended with a 2.4-litre engine block. Mounting the 16-valve head on this gave a massive output, and the opportunity to make several tune-ups for the rally drivers.

Opel delivered the first 23 specimens in 1981 which were recognizable by the 2-slot front grille (1982 through 1984 models had 4-slot grilles). The cars were delivered as both street cars and factory tuned rally cars. The streetcars known as Phase 1 cars, were luxury versions of the known Manta B Coupé. Although all the changes to give the body more strength were still implemented, the cars were delivered with all kinds of exclusive packaging. Recaro seats with big Opel badges on the cloth, Irmscher leather steering wheel, and even front light washers were mounted. The cars were all delivered in Arctic White colour, with White Ronal lightweight 7x15" alloys. The engine was fitted with a Bosch LE injection system and power output was 144 PS (106 kW). The Phase 2 (Evolution) however was quite different: It had large extended arches front and rear made of materials such as carbon and kevlar to keep the weight down, lightweight doors, bonnet, spoilers, and plastic windows. The wheels were still from Ronal but now measuring 8x15" front and 10x15" rear. The engine output was 230 PS (169 kW) using a set of 48 mm (1.9 in) DCOE style carburettors, and the cars could be delivered with different gearboxes from ZF and with different rear axle options like LSD. The engine was also moved 8 cm (3.1 in) rearwards in the chassis, while weight at the rear was brought forward, improving weight distribution and reducing moment of inertia.

"Phase 3" is sometimes used when talking about the i400s, which was not a factory tune-up. Many racers of the time had their garages tune up the engine even further. Some made it across the 300 PS (220 kW) mark.

The Manta 400 was produced in a total of 245 specimens following the homologation regulations by FISA (today FIA). But the i400 also spawned some other "i" models: The first was the i200 which basically was a GSi model Manta B with most of the Manta 400's appearance. 700 were made and are still considered a collector's item. The i200 used a lightly tuned 2.0E engine delivering 125 PS (92 kW). There was also the i240, which is rarer as only 300 were produced, it is fitted with the i400 engine block but using a normal eight-valve cast-iron head from the 2.0E engine. First presented at the 1985 Geneva Motor Show, it produces 136 PS (100 kW; 134 hp) and has a claimed top speed of 200 km/h (124 mph).

Also Irmscher themselves tried building the Manta with their own specs. The reason they were used for the 400 project was that in 1977 they had taken a 1977 Manta B 1.9S and put in a 2.8-litre H spec engine from the Opel Admiral of that time. Success was limited, even though the cars were on display at the 1977 Geneva Motor Show. The cars had been painted in some special colours giving it the nickname "Paradiesvogel" (Bird of Paradise) because of the rainbow like colour theme on the cars. However they did produce 28 units fitted with the 2.8H engine delivering 150 PS (110 kW) and 220 N⋅m (162 lb⋅ft) of torque.

After the success of the 400 (and i200/240) Irmscher once again tried the 6-cylinder layout. This time producing the most powerful Manta B ever released on the public market, the Irmscher i300. In 1985, Irmscher bought a handful of unfinished Manta 400 cars from Opel, which were on stock. The cars had no drivetrains but were fitted with the Phase 2 equipment. Irmscher installed the new 3.0-litre LE-Jetronic engine from the Monza and Senator models, which delivered 176 PS (129 kW) and 232 N⋅m (171 lb⋅ft) of torque. Power was transmitted to a Getrag 265 gearbox, onto a 3.18:1 LSD rear axle, giving the car a 0–100 km/h (62 mph) sprint time of 8.4 seconds and a top speed of 220 km/h (137 mph).

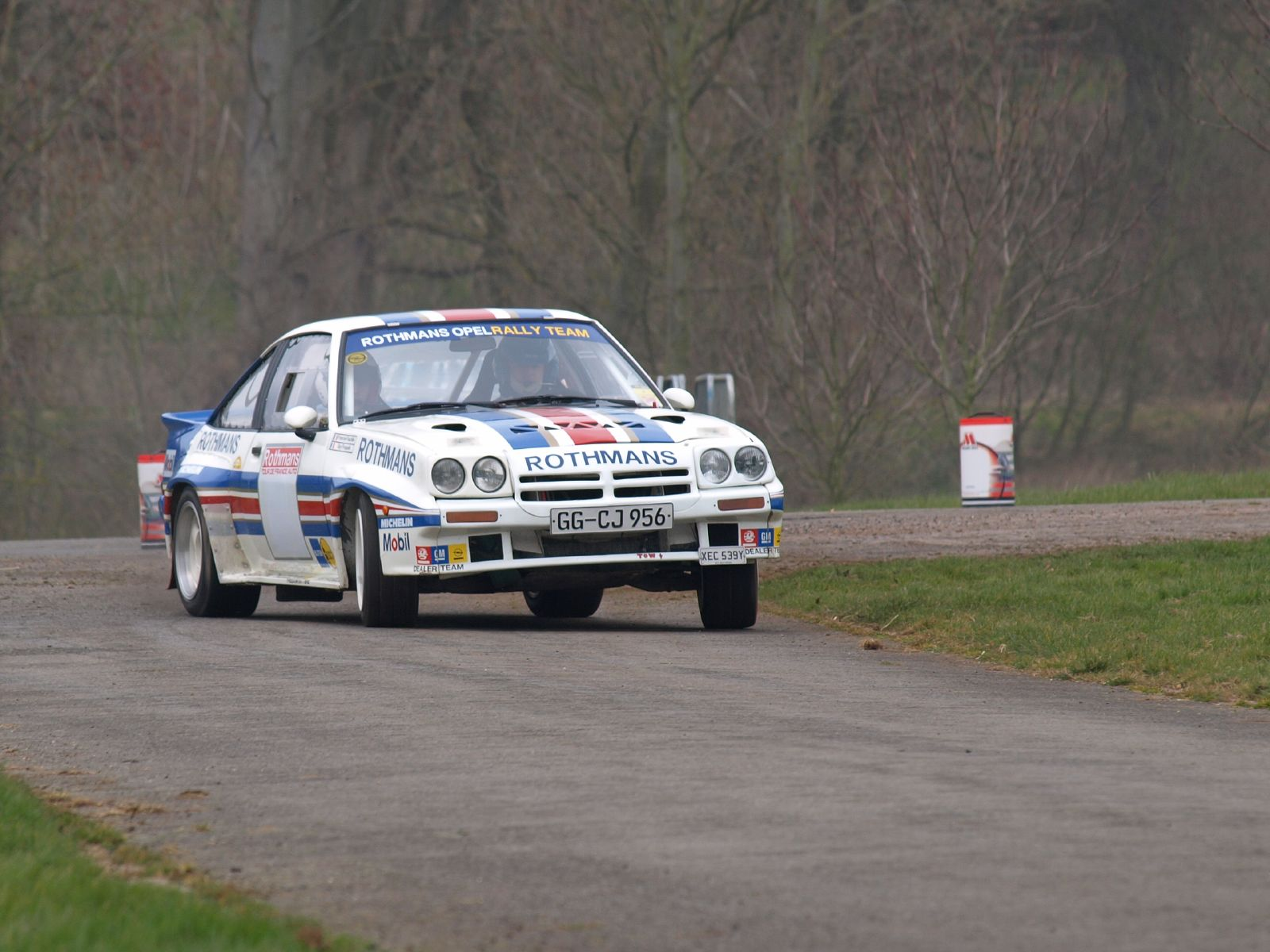
Guy Fréquelin's Manta 400 rally car driven at the Race Retro 2008.

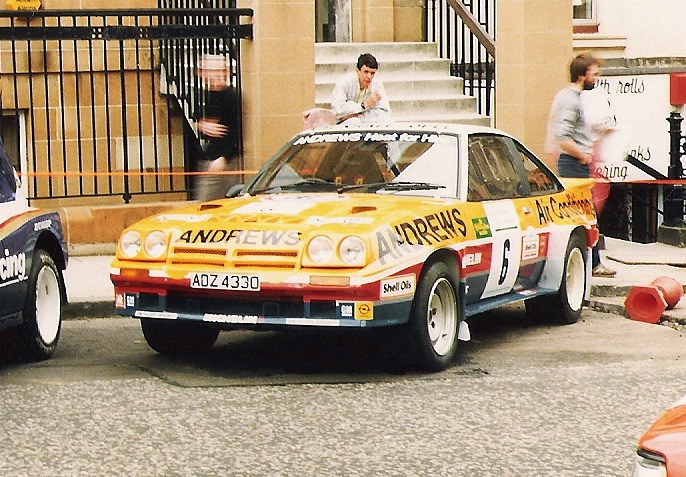
Russell Brookes' Manta 400.

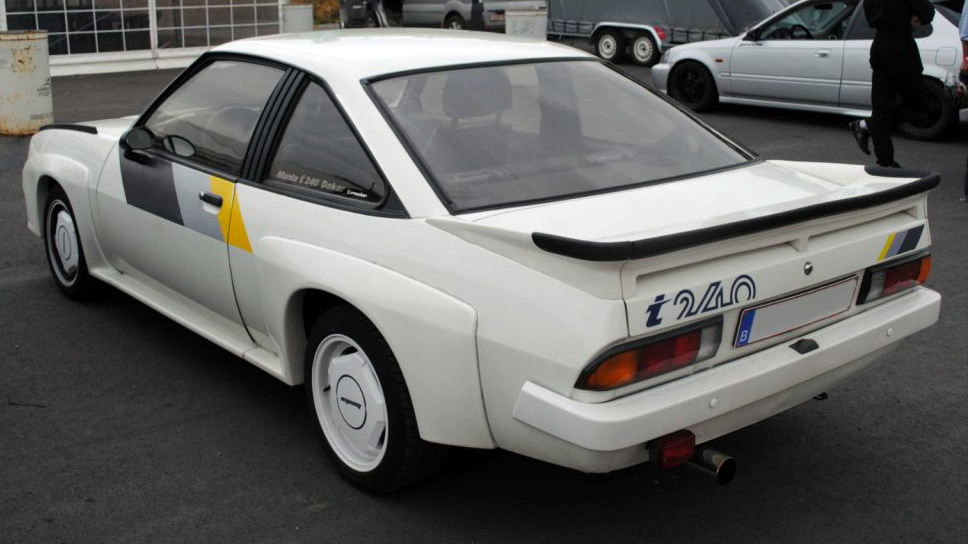
The Irmscher i240 Dakar, a special version for the Swiss market (rear).

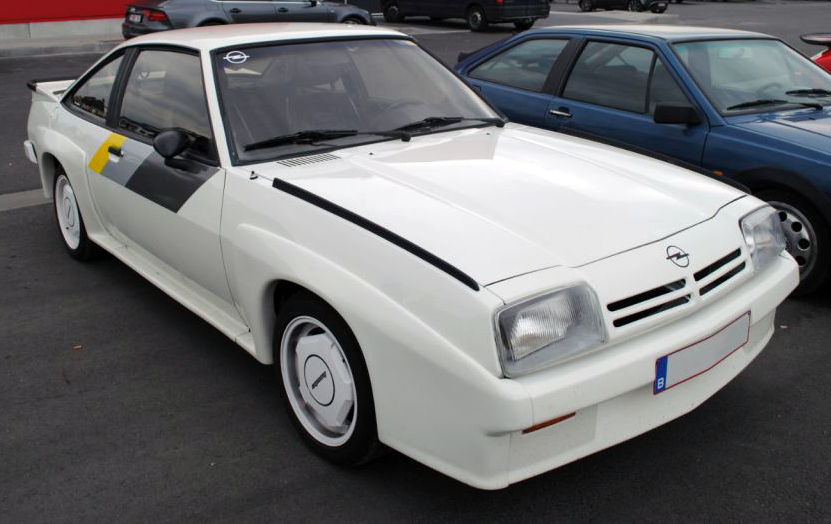
The Irmscher i240 Dakar (front). This special version for the Swiss market only differed in having windsplits on the front fenders.

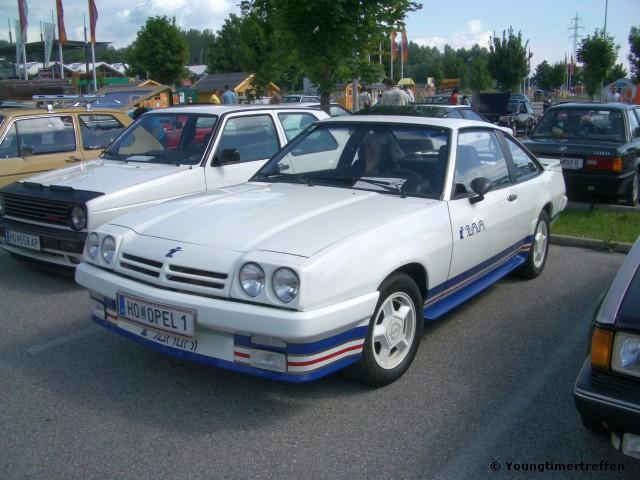
Opel Manta Irmscher i200

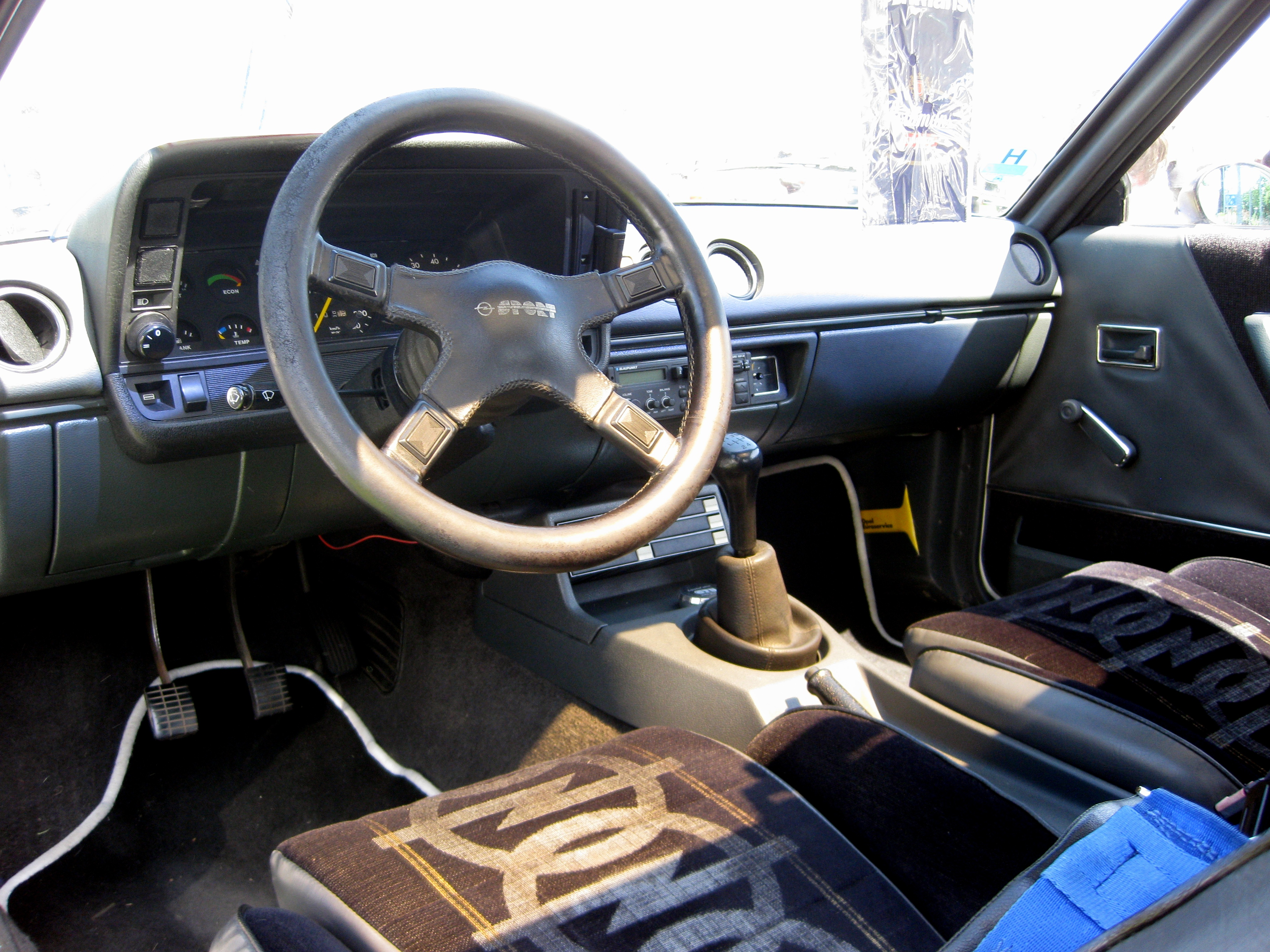
Opel Manta Irmscher i200 interior

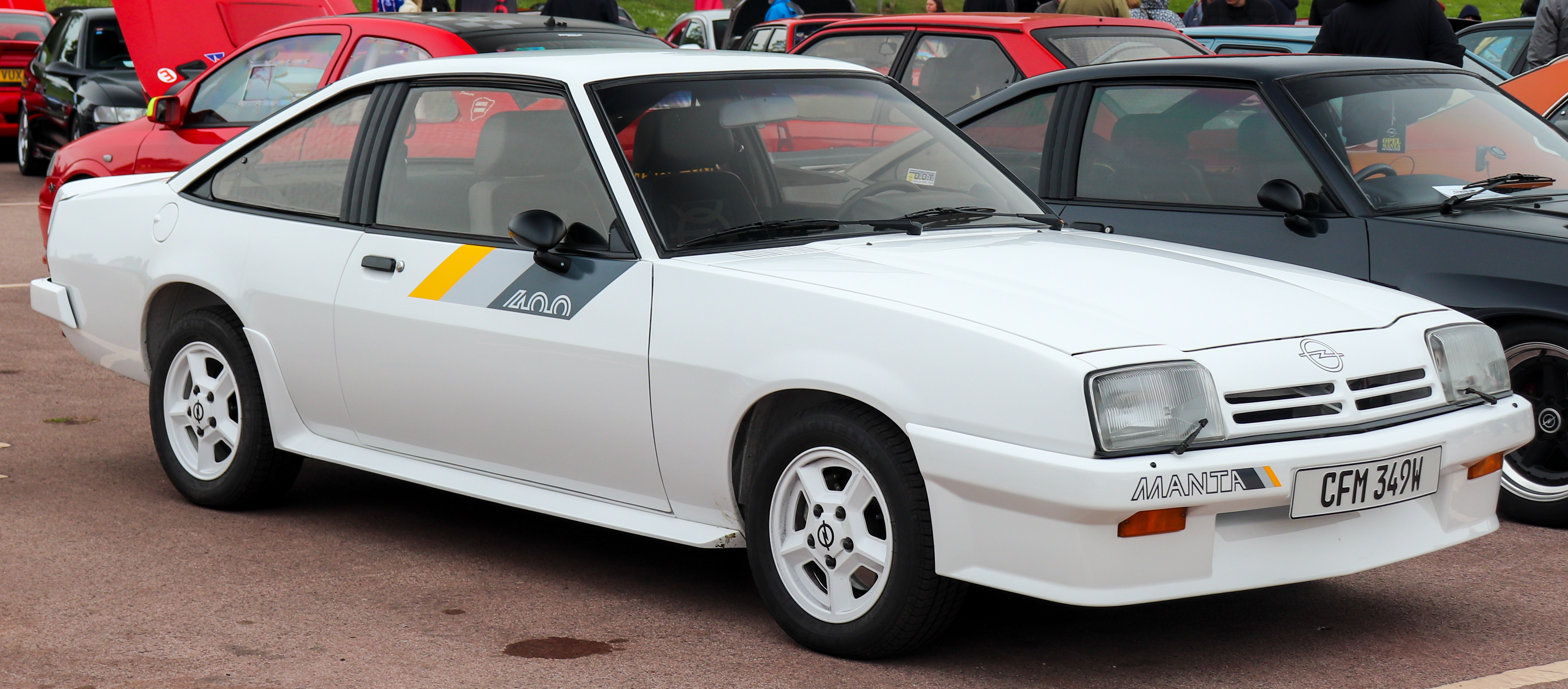
Opel Manta 400

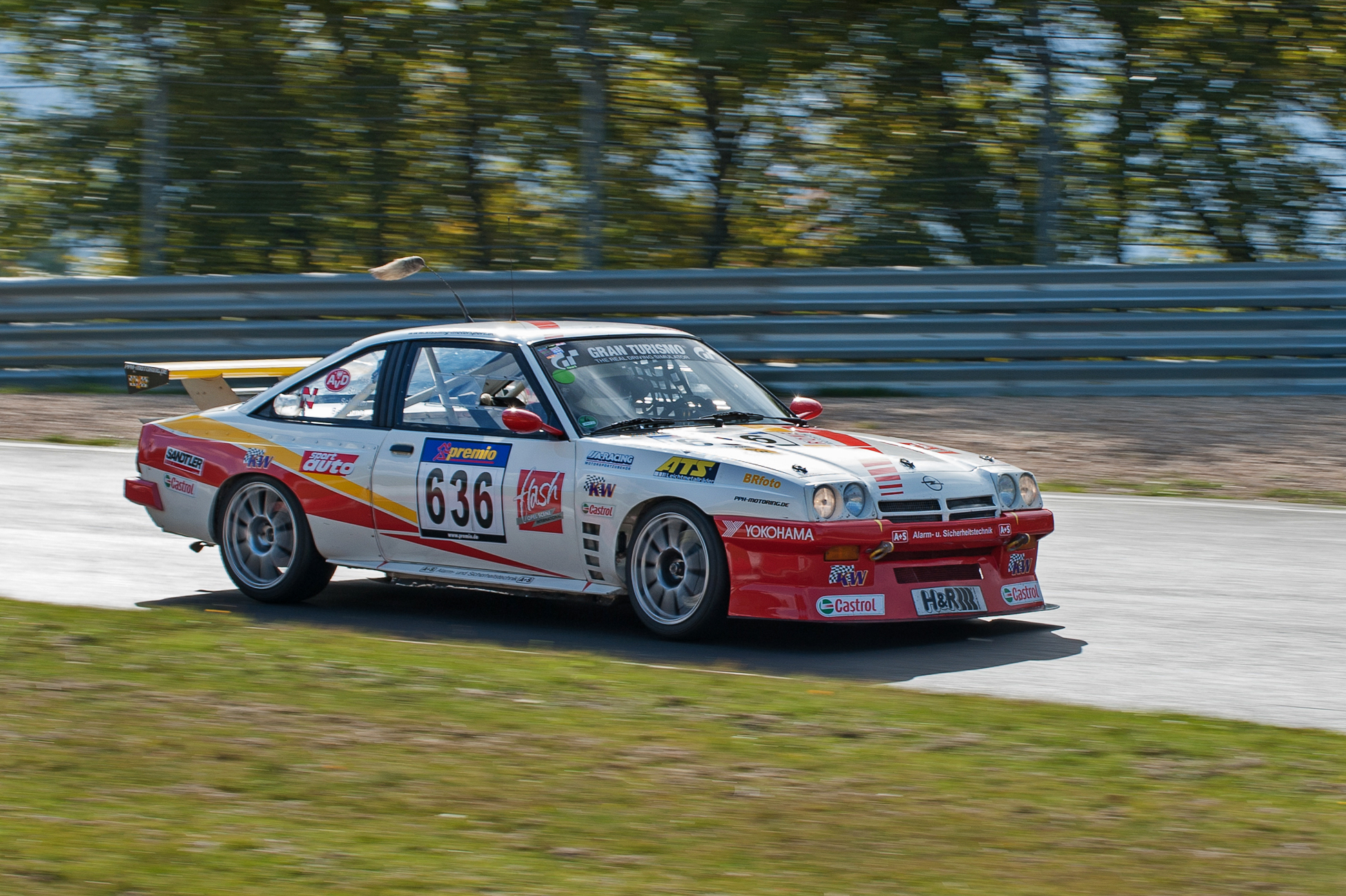
Opel Manta B on the Nürburgring, still races to this day. This Manta is also known as the ‘Flying Fox’, named as such for the fox tail tied to the aerial.

== Convertible versions ==
Vauxhall, from 1978 until 1979, offered the Cavalier Coupe in convertible format called the Centaur. Only 118 of these were made and fewer than thirty are believed to survive as of 2007. About a quarter of these conversions were built using a Manta, rather than Vauxhall basis. The cars were developed by Magraw Engineering and sold through Vauxhall dealerships on behalf of Crayford Engineering.

== See also ==
- Manta joke
