= Ronal =

Manufacturer of aluminum alloy wheels

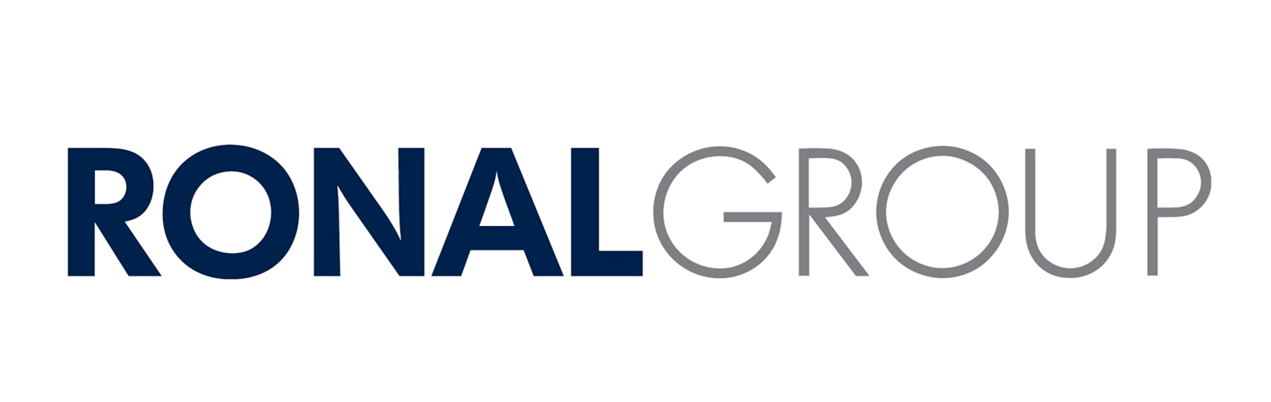

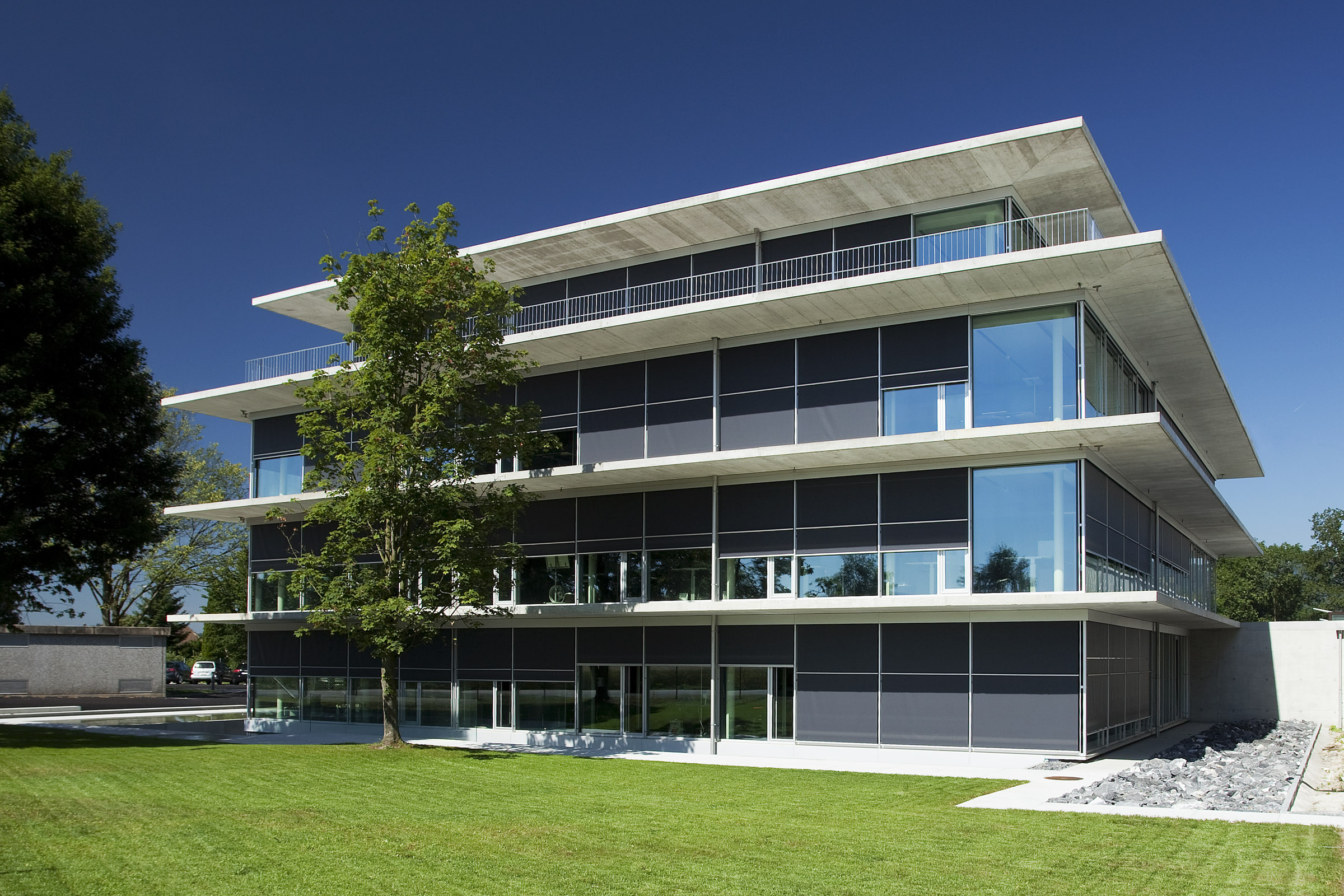
- Ronal AG headquarters in Härkingen
- Formation: 1969; 57 years ago
- Founder: Karl Wirth
- Founded at: Forst (Baden), Germany
- Headquarters: Härkingen, Switzerland
- CEO: Alexandra Bendler
- Staff: 6,400
- Website: Official website

Ronal AG is a manufacturer of aluminum alloy wheels for cars and commercial vehicles as well as shower solutions and bathroom furniture based in Härkingen, Switzerland. The company employs approximately 6400 personnel and produces both cast and forged wheels. The company is active in both the OEM and aftermarket for cars and commercial vehicles. In 2023, the former SanSwiss Group became Ronal Bathrooms, the company's bathroom and wellness division.

The Ronal Group has 12 wheel production facilities, six bathroom furniture production plants, two factories for tool manufacturing, and a logistics center and has its own sales locations in eleven countries. The company produces approximately 16 million wheels annually for the automotive industry and its own brands Ronal and Speedline Truck. Ronal AG develops and produces its own production tools. This takes place at the sites Cantanhede in Portugal and Härkingen in Switzerland. The company also has its own research and development center in Forst, Germany.

Ronal also owns Ronal Bathrooms AG (shower solutions and bathroom furniture), based in Gunzgen, Switzerland.

== History ==
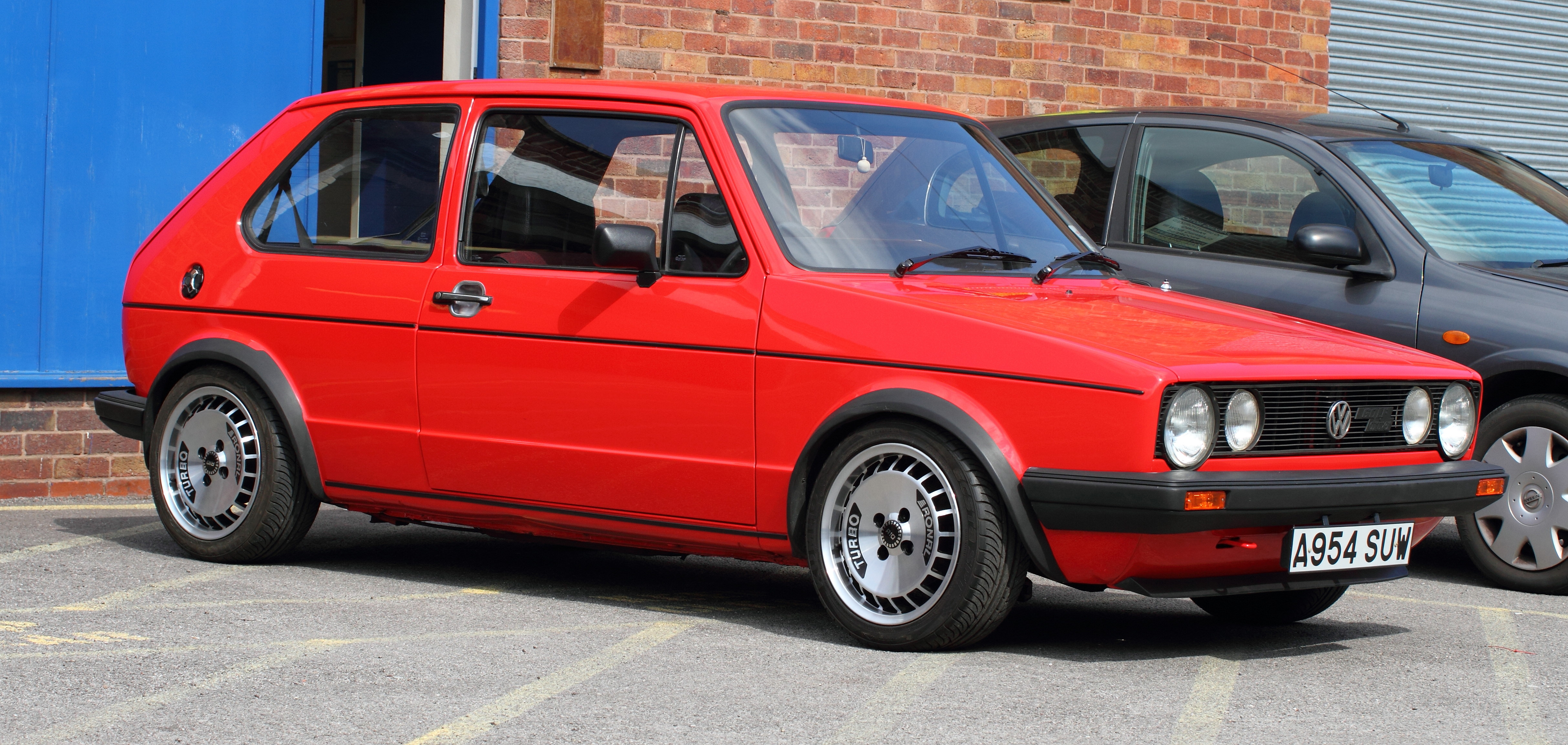
1983 Volkswagen Golf on aftermarket Ronal R10 Turbo wheels

Ronal was founded in Germany in 1969 by Karl Wirth. The entrepreneur and Formula V driver saw a need for aluminum wheels. Wirth thus became one of the pioneers of light alloy wheels on the global market. The first factory was opened back in 1978 in France. In 2007 Ronal AG purchased Italian wheel manufacturer Speedline, which covers the commercial vehicle segment including trucks, trailers and buses. This helped the group expand into the racing and Formula 1 sectors as well as into weight-optimized flow forming technology. 83 FIA titles have been won on Speedline Corse wheels. In 2012, Ronal expanded its range to include forged wheels with the majority stake in Fullchamp in Taiwan. In 2013, Ronal AG joined forces with the Australian company, Carbon Revolution, to launch the first one-piece carbon wheel on the European market. With the acquisition of APP-Tech from Padova, Italy, the Group expanded its capacity in the forged wheel sector. In 2016, the Ronlog logistics center was opened in Forst, Germany.

In 2019, the Ronal Group celebrated its 50th anniversary.

In 2023, Ronal and the German private equity company Callista completed the sale of the subsidiary Speedline S.r.l. including the brands “SpeedlineE” and “Speedline CorseE” with legal effect from October 1, 2023. The Ronal Group will continue its support activities for the Italian market as well as Group-wide activities in its new company Ronal Italia Services S.r.l. Ronal acquired the companies with the associated brands Glass 1989, Karol (both Italy) and Kudos (UK, South Africa) for the strategic expansion of the Bathroom and Wellness Division. In 2024, the SanSwiss division was renamed Ronal Bathrooms. The SanSwiss product brand is renamed Ronal.

== Divisions ==
- OEM: Original equipment manufacturing for automobile manufacturers around the world
- Cars: Aftermarket parts sold with the brands Ronal, Speedline Corse
- Commercial vehicles: OEM and aftermarket parts for trucks, buses and trailers with the brand Speedline Truck
- Sanitary: Ronal Bathrooms, specialized in the production of high-quality shower units.

== Technology ==
Ronal AG works to make the wheels lighter with technologies such as flowforming, forging and undercuting. Furthermore, Ronal AG uses process for the surface finishing like multi color rim (MCR), pad printing, laser and diamond cutting and polishing.
