= List of dramatic television series with LGBTQ characters: 2020s =

This is a list of dramatic television series (including web television and miniseries) that premiered in the 2020s which feature lesbian, gay, bisexual, and transgender characters. Non-binary, pansexual, asexual, and graysexual characters are also included. The orientation can be portrayed on-screen, described in the dialogue or mentioned.

== 2020 ==
| Year | Show | Network | Character | Actor | Notes |
|---|---|---|---|---|---|
| 2020–2025 | 9-1-1: Lone Star | Fox | TK Strand | Ronen Rubinstein | TK is a gay paramedic who was formerly a firefighter. He is married to Carlos. |
| 2020–2025 | 9-1-1: Lone Star | Fox | Carlos Reyes | Rafael L. Silva | Carlos is gay and a policeman. He is married to TK. |
| 2020–2025 | 9-1-1: Lone Star | Fox | Paul Strickland | Brian Michael Smith | Paul is a trans man and a firefighter. |
| 2020–2025 | 9-1-1: Lone Star | Fox | Nancy Gillian | Brianna Baker | Nancy is a bisexual woman and a paramedic. |
| 2020–2025 | Alice in Borderland | Netflix | Hikari Kuina | Aya Asahina | Kuina is a transgender woman and skilled fighter. |
| 2020–2021 | The Baby-Sitters Club | Netflix | Dawn Schafer | Xochitl Gomez (season 1); Kyndra Sanchez (season 2) | Dawn is open to any gender. |
| 2020 | The Baker and the Beauty | ABC | Natalie Garcia | Belissa Escobedo | Natalie is lesbian. Amy is lesbian and Natalie's girlfriend. |
| 2020 | The Baker and the Beauty | ABC | Amy | Madelyn Sher | Natalie is lesbian. Amy is lesbian and Natalie's girlfriend. |
| 2020–2023 | Big Sky | ABC | Jerrie Kennedy | Jesse James Keitel | Jerrie is a trans woman prostitute and musician from Montana. In season 1, episode 3, Jerrie is asked when she knew that she was a different gender than how she was biologically born. Jerrie said she knew as early as four years old, and when she was fourteen, told her parents that she was a girl. |
| 2020–2024 | Blood & Water | Netflix | Chris Ackerman | Arno Greeff | Chris is introduced as having been in a relationship with Zama. He has an affair with Mark and reveals that he is pansexual. |
| 2020–2024 | Blood & Water | Netflix | Mark Tedder | Duane Williams | Mark is gay. |
| 2020–2024 | Blutige Anfänger | ZDF | Michael Kelting | Werner Daehn | Michael is gay and Claas' partner. Claas is Michael's partner. Bruno is gay and hooks up/is interested in Phillip. Phillip hooks up with Bruno. |
| 2020–2024 | Blutige Anfänger | ZDF | Dr. Claas Steinebach | Martin Bretschneider | Michael is gay and Claas' partner. Claas is Michael's partner. Bruno is gay and hooks up/is interested in Phillip. Phillip hooks up with Bruno. |
| 2020–2024 | Blutige Anfänger | ZDF | Bruno Pérez | Martin Peñaloza Cecconi | Michael is gay and Claas' partner. Claas is Michael's partner. Bruno is gay and hooks up/is interested in Phillip. Phillip hooks up with Bruno. |
| 2020–2024 | Blutige Anfänger | ZDF | Phillip Schneider | Eric Cordes | Michael is gay and Claas' partner. Claas is Michael's partner. Bruno is gay and hooks up/is interested in Phillip. Phillip hooks up with Bruno. |
| 2020– | Bridgerton | Netflix | Henry Granville | Julian Ovenden | Henry is secretly gay and has a relationship with Lord Wetherby. |
| 2020– | Bridgerton | Netflix | Lord Wetherby | Ned Porteous | Henry is secretly gay and has a relationship with Lord Wetherby. |
| 2020– | Bridgerton | Netflix | Benedict Bridgerton | Luke Thompson | As of season 3, Benedict is canonically pansexual. |
| 2020– | Bridgerton | Netflix | Francesca Bridgerton | Hannah Dodd | As of the season 3 finale, Francesca is implied to be attracted to women. |
| 2020 | Cherry Magic! Thirty Years of Virginity Can Make You a Wizard?! | TV Tokyo, Tencent Video, Crunchyroll | Kiyoshi Adachi | Eiji Akaso | Kurosawa is secretly in love with Adachi and often fantasizes about him. Adachi lacks self-confidence, but he is starting to change because of his relationship with Kurosawa. |
| 2020 | Cherry Magic! Thirty Years of Virginity Can Make You a Wizard?! | TV Tokyo, Tencent Video, Crunchyroll | Yuichi Kurosawa | Keita Machida | Kurosawa is secretly in love with Adachi and often fantasizes about him. Adachi lacks self-confidence, but he is starting to change because of his relationship with Kurosawa. |
| 2020–2022 | Control Z | Netflix | Gerry Granda | Patricio Gallardo | Gerry is Gay. He struggled with coming to terms with his sexuality since his secret was revealed early in season 1. He first thought he was bisexual because he liked women but also looked at men. In season 3 episode 6, he comes out as gay and admitting it in his juvenile detention center. |
| 2020–2022 | Control Z | Netflix | Isabela De La Fuente | Zión Moreno | Isabela is a trans woman. Her secret, which was she transitioned, was the first secret to be revealed. She states that she transitioned before enrolling at National School. |
| 2020–2022 | Control Z | Netflix | Álex Salomone | Samantha Acuña | Álex is openly Lesbian, and in a relationship with Gabriela. |
| 2020–2022 | Control Z | Netflix | Maria Alexander | Fiona Palomo | Maria is Bisexual. She has a crush on her new friend Claudia in season 2, and her attraction is confirmed when she kisses Claudia. |
| 2020–2022 | Control Z | Netflix | Luis Navarro | Luis Curiel | Luis is Gay. He had a crush on popular kid Gerry Granda. |
| 2020–2022 | Control Z | Netflix | Felipe 'Pipe' | Pierre Louis | Felipe is openly Gay and Gerry's love interest. They have a fling in season 2, before their relationship end when Gerry goes to juvenile detention. He and Gerry reunite at the end of season 3. |
| 2020–2022 | Control Z | Netflix | Bernardo | David Montalvos | Bernardo is Gay and Gerry's love interest in season 3 while he was still in juvenile detention. Their relationship ends when Gerry leaves the center. |
| 2020–2022 | Control Z | Netflix | Gabriela | Lidia San José | Gabriela is Lesbian and a teacher. She was in a relationship with Álex from season 1 to season 2, before her departure to Spain. |
| 2020 | Council of Dads | NBC | Dr. Oliver Post | J. August Richards | Oliver is gay and married to Peter. They are fathers. |
| 2020 | Council of Dads | NBC | Peter Richards | Kevin Daniels | Peter is gay and married to Oliver. |
| 2020 | Council of Dads | NBC | Charlotte Perry | Thalia Tran | Charlotte is lesbian. Charlotte and J.J. are siblings being raised by their mother and the Council of Dads after their father dies of cancer. |
| 2020 | Council of Dads | NBC | JJ Perry | Blue Chapman | J.J. is transgender. J.J. and Charlotte are siblings being raised by their mother and the Council of Dads after their father dies of cancer. |
| 2020 | Curon | Netflix | Daria Raina | Margherita Morchio | Daria is bisexual. |
| 2020 | Curon | Netflix | Micki Asper | Juju Di Domenico | Micki is lesbian. |
| 2020 | Deputy | Fox | Brianna Bishop | Bex Taylor-Klaus | Brianna is a lesbian, and a deputy sheriff. In season 1, episode 9, Brianna comes out as non-binary and takes the Bishop surname as the neutral identity name. |
| 2020 | Deputy | Fox | Genevieve | Karrueche Tran | Genevieve is a lesbian and Brianna's girlfriend. |
| 2020 | Desenfrenadas | Netflix | Vera | Tessa Ía | Marcela is lesbian, and in a relationship with Vera. |
| 2020 | Desenfrenadas | Netflix | Marcela | Coty Camacho | Vera dated males but didn't like sex with them. She came out to Marcela and is in a relationship with her. |
| 2020–2021 | Diary of a Future President | Disney+ | Roberto "Bobby" Cañero-Reed | Charlie Bushnell | Bobby is gay. |
| 2020–2021 | Diary of a Future President | Disney+ | CJ | Donovin Miller | CJ and Bobby start dating. |
| 2020–2021 | Diary of a Future President | Disney+ | Camilla | Jessica Marie Garcia | Camilla and Daniella are girlfriends and get engaged in season 2. |
| 2020–2021 | Diary of a Future President | Disney+ | Daniella | Ellie Reed | Camilla and Daniella are girlfriends and get engaged in season 2. |
| 2020 | Dispatches from Elsewhere | AMC | Simone | Eve Lindley | Simone is a main character and a trans woman. |
| 2020 | Don't Look Deeper | Quibi | Aisha | Helena Howard | Aisha is bisexual. |
| 2020– | Emily in Paris | Netflix | Camille | Camille Razat | Camille had been in a love affair with Sofia, a Greek artist who she works with. |
| 2020– | Emily in Paris | Netflix | Sofia Sideris | Melia Kreiling | Camille had been in a love affair with Sofia, a Greek artist who she works with. |
| 2020–2021 | El Cid | Amazon Prime Video | Garcia | Nicolás Illoro | Garcia is gay or bisexual. He is in love with Nuño, his personal advisor. |
| 2020–2025 | FBI: Most Wanted | CBS | Sheryll Barnes | Roxy Sternberg | Sheryll is a former undercover cop in the NYPD, and it's revealed in episode 4 that she is a lesbian. She's married to a woman, and they have a daughter. |
| 2020–2021 | Feel Good | Channel 4; Netflix | Mae | Mae Martin | Mae, a recovering addict, does not initially identify her sexuality. She has had relationships with men and women and is in a same-sex relationship. In season 1, episode 5, they identify as transgender, non-binary, and bisexual. Then in season 1, episode 6, they attempt sex with a man. |
| 2020–2021 | Feel Good | Channel 4; Netflix | George | Charlotte Ritchie | George, Mae's girlfriend, previously identified as straight before she started dating Mae. |
| 2020 | Gameboys | YouTube; Netflix | Cairo Lazaro | Elijah Canlas | Cairo is gay. Cairo and Gavreel are love interests. |
| 2020 | Gameboys | YouTube; Netflix | Gavreel Mendoza Alarcon | Kokoy De Santos | Gavreel is gay. Cairo and Gavreel are love interests. |
| 2020 | Gameboys | YouTube; Netflix | Pearl Gatdula | Adrianna So | Pearl is bisexual. |
| 2020–2021 | Gentefied | Netflix | Ana Morales | Karrie Martin | Ana is a lesbian, she is also in a relationship with Yessika. |
| 2020 | Get Even | BBC iPlayer | Olivia Hayes | Jessica Alexander | Olivia is lesbian and likes Amber's flirtations. |
| 2020 | Get Even | BBC iPlayer | Amber | Razan Nassar | Amber is lesbian and interested in Olivia. They kiss and acknowledge their feelings for each other in season 1, episode 9, "Get It Out". |
| 2020 | Grand Army | Netflix | Siddhartha "Sid" Pakam | Amir Bageria | Sid is gay. He is struggling to accept his sexuality and is outed. Sid and Victor are love interests. |
| 2020 | Grand Army | Netflix | Victor | August Blanco Rosenstein | Victor is bisexual. |
| 2020 | The Haunting of Bly Manor | Netflix | Danielle "Dani" Clayton | Victoria Pedretti | Dani is lesbian. Dani and Jamie become a romantic relationship. |
| 2020 | The Haunting of Bly Manor | Netflix | Jamie Taylor | Amelia Eve | Jamie is lesbian. |
| 2020 | Helstrom | Hulu | Chris Yen | Alain Uy | Chris is gay. |
| 2020 | Helstrom | Hulu | Derrick Jackson | Hamza Fouad | Derrick is gay and Chris's boyfriend. |
| 2020–2024 | Hightown | Starz | Jackie Quinones | Monica Raymund | Jackie is lesbian and a National Marine Fisheries Service agent on Cape Cod. |
| 2020–2024 | Hightown | Starz | Devonne Wilson | Gia Crovatin | Devonne is lesbian and Jackie's ex-girlfriend. |
| 2020 | Hollywood | Netflix | Richard "Dick" Samuels | Joe Mantello | Richard is a closeted gay studio executive. |
| 2020 | Hollywood | Netflix | Ernest "Ernie" West | Dylan McDermott | Ernest is a sexually fluid Hollywood pimp. |
| 2020 | Hollywood | Netflix | Rock Hudson | Jake Picking | Hudson comes out as a gay man with his boyfriend, Archie Coleman. |
| 2020 | Hollywood | Netflix | Archie Coleman | Jeremy Pope | Archie is an African-American aspiring screenwriter and boyfriend of Rock Hudson. |
| 2020 | Hollywood | Netflix | Henry Willson | Jim Parsons | Willson is a gay Hollywood talent agent. |
| 2020 | Hollywood | Netflix | George Cukor | Daniel London | Cukor is a known homosexual. |
| 2020 | Hollywood | Netflix | Noël Coward | Billy Boyd | Coward is a known homosexual. |
| 2020–2023 | Hunters | Amazon Prime Video | Millie Morris | Jerrika Hinton | Millie is a closeted lesbian FBI agent. |
| 2020–2023 | Hunters | Amazon Prime Video | Maria De La Ruiz | Julissa Bermudez | Maria is a lesbian and Millie's girlfriend. |
| 2020 | I Am Not Okay with This | Netflix | Sydney "Syd" Novak | Sophia Lillis | Sydney is a teenager coming to terms with her lesbian orientation. She has romantic feelings for her best friend Dina, and her first sex experience was with her male friend Stanley, but she later decides to just be friends with him. |
| 2020 | I May Destroy You | BBC One; HBO | Kwame | Paapa Essiedu | Kwame is gay and one of the main character's, Arabella, best friends. Damon is one of Kwame's hookups. Tyrone is Kwame's love interest. Kai is a trans man and Terry's, Kwame's friend, love interest. |
| 2020 | I May Destroy You | BBC One; HBO | Damon | Fehinti Balogun | Kwame is gay and one of the main character's, Arabella, best friends. Damon is one of Kwame's hookups. Tyrone is Kwame's love interest. Kai is a trans man and Terry's, Kwame's friend, love interest. |
| 2020 | I May Destroy You | BBC One; HBO | Tyrone | Gershwyn Eustache Jr | Kwame is gay and one of the main character's, Arabella, best friends. Damon is one of Kwame's hookups. Tyrone is Kwame's love interest. Kai is a trans man and Terry's, Kwame's friend, love interest. |
| 2020 | I May Destroy You | BBC One; HBO | Kai | Tyler Luke Cunningham | Kwame is gay and one of the main character's, Arabella, best friends. Damon is one of Kwame's hookups. Tyrone is Kwame's love interest. Kai is a trans man and Terry's, Kwame's friend, love interest. |
| 2020- | Industry | HBO | Gus Sackey | David Jonsson | Gus is gay and hooks up with Theo. |
| 2020- | Industry | HBO | Robert Spearing | Harry Lawtey | Robert is bisexual. |
| 2020- | Industry | HBO | TheoTuck | Will Tudor | Theo is gay, closeted, occasionally hooks up with Gus and has a girlfriend. |
| 2020 | Julie and the Phantoms | Netflix | Alex Mercer | Owen Patrick Joyner | Alex is a gay ghost, and the drummer for the fictional band Julie and the Phantoms. He falls in love with another gay ghost named Willie, an avid skateboarder. |
| 2020 | Julie and the Phantoms | Netflix | Willie | Booboo Stewart | Willie is a gay ghost, and a diehard skateboarder. He is Alex's love interest. |
| 2020 | Katy Keene | The CW | Jorge/Ginger Lopez | Jonny Beauchamp | Jorge Lopez is openly gay and performs in drag bars under 'Ginger', his female persona. |
| 2020 | Katy Keene | The CW | Pepper Smith | Julia Chan | Pepper is queer. She is an it girl with a mysterious past. |
| 2020 | Kissing Game | Netflix | Fran | Iza Moreira | Fran is a closeted lesbian. |
| 2020 | Kissing Game | Netflix | Chico | Michel Joelsas | Chico is gay and becomes infatuated with an older man, Maurilio. |
| 2020 | Kissing Game | Netflix | Bel | Luana Nastas | Bel is bisexual and the first victim of the mysterious disease. |
| 2020 | Kissing Game | Netflix | Maurílio | Thomas Aquino | Maurílio is an older man and is closeted. He becomes involved with a gay high school student, Chico. |
| 2020 | Kissing Game | Netflix | Alex Nero | Caio Horowicz | Alex is demisexual, and only feels sexually attracted to someone when he has an emotional bond with them. They can be gay, straight, bisexual, or pansexual, and may have any gender identity. |
| 2020–2022 | Little America | Apple TV+ | Rafiq | Haaz Sleiman | Rafiq and Zain are both gay Syrian refugees seeking asylum in the United States. |
| 2020–2022 | Little America | Apple TV+ | Zain | Adam Ali | Rafiq and Zain are both gay Syrian refugees seeking asylum in the United States. |
| 2020 | Little Fires Everywhere | Hulu | Mia Warren | Kerry Washington | Mia is bisexual and had an affair with her professor, Pauline, while studying arts. |
| 2020 | Little Fires Everywhere | Hulu | Pauline Hawthorne | Anika Noni Rose | Pauline is a lesbian. |
| 2020 | Little Fires Everywhere | Hulu | Izzy Richardson | Megan Stott | Izzy is lesbian. She was in love with her former best friend April, whom she had been secretly together with for over a year. |
| 2020 | Little Fires Everywhere | Hulu | April Jarvis | Isabel Gravitt | April is a closeted lesbian. She was in a hidden relationship with Izzy, then ostracized her when they were discovered kissing at a party. |
| 2020–2022 | Locke & Key | Netflix | Duncan Locke | Aaron Ashmore | Duncan is gay and has a partner named Brian Rogan. |
| 2020–2021 | Love Life | HBO Max | Mallory Moore | Sasha Compère | Della is the lesbian roommate of Darby. |
| 2020–2022 | Love, Victor | Hulu | Victor Salazar | Michael Cimino | Victor is a new student in high school, who comes out and dates Benji Campbell. |
| 2020–2022 | Love, Victor | Hulu | Benji Campbell | George Sear | Benji is an openly gay teenager, who works as a barista at the coffee shop where Victor works part-time. |
| 2020–2022 | Love, Victor | Hulu | Rahim | Anthony Keyvan | Rahim is initially introduced in season 2 as the closeted gay friend of Victor's younger sister Pilar. He later becomes a love interest for Victor. |
| 2020–2022 | Love, Victor | Hulu | Derek | Lukas Gage | Derek is openly gay and is Benji's boyfriend for a short period. |
| 2020–2022 | Love, Victor | Hulu | Bram Greenfeld | Keiynan Lonsdale | Bram is gay and Simon's boyfriend, he appears in season 1, episode 8, when Victor goes to New York. |
| 2020–2022 | Love, Victor | Hulu | Simon Spier | Nick Robinson | Simon is openly gay and Bram's boyfriend. He appears via voice-over, narrating messages to Victor, and appears in person in season 1, episode 8. |
| 2020 | Lovecraft Country | HBO | Montrose Freeman | Michael K. Williams | Montrose is a closeted gay. He and Sammy have a secret affair. |
| 2020 | Lovecraft Country | HBO | Sammy | Jon Hudson Odom | Montrose is a closeted gay. He and Sammy have a secret affair. |
| 2020 | Luna Nera | Netflix | Leptis | Lucrezia Guidone | Leptis is lesbian and a witch. Leptis and Tebe are a couple. |
| 2020 | Luna Nera | Netflix | Tebe | Manuela Mandracchia | Tebe is lesbian and a witch. |
| 2020– | Miss Scarlet and The Duke | Alibi | Rupert Parker | Andrew Gower | Rupert is secretly gay, and a wealthy bachelor whose controlling mother wants him to find a suitable wife. When he proposes to Eliza Scarlet and she declines, he is relieved and reveals to her that he is gay. In season 1, episode 4, ("Memento Mori"), he proposes an arrangement of convenience to Eliza, wherein she can benefit from his wealth, while in return he can live an independent life without the pressure of a real marriage. He makes it clear to her that it would not involve intimacy between them and recoils at the thought of sex with a woman (Eliza turns him down amicably). |
| 2020–2022 | Motherland: Fort Salem | Freeform | Raelle Collar | Taylor Hickson | Raelle is lesbian. In episode "Hail Beltane" (season 1, episode 4) she tells a male witch at the Beltane festival that she's "not into guys". Unaware of who she really is, Raelle falls for Scylla, and they begin a relationship. |
| 2020–2022 | Motherland: Fort Salem | Freeform | Scylla Ramshorn | Amalia Holm | Scylla is bisexual and seduces Raelle. She is a Spree terrorist using a false identity and assigned with bringing Raelle to them, but she develops feelings for her. In episode "Bellweather Season" (season 1, episode 5) she defies the Spree and before disappearing during a Spree attack tells Raelle "Whatever happens, I love you." Their relationship ends after Scylla's affiliation with the Spree is discovered. |
| 2020 | My Engineer | Tencent Video | Bohn | Cooper Patpasit | Bohn is gay and the love interest of Duen. |
| 2020 | My Engineer | Tencent Video | Duen | Poy Kritsanapong | Duen is gay and the love interest of Bohn. |
| 2020 | My Engineer | Tencent Video | Ram | Perth Nakhun | Ram is gay and the love interest of King. |
| 2020 | My Engineer | Tencent Video | King | Lay Talay | King is gay and the love interest of Ram. |
| 2020 | My Engineer | Tencent Video | Mek | Ryan Peng | Maek is gay and the love interest of Boss. |
| 2020 | My Engineer | Tencent Video | Boss | Inntouch Naphat | Boss is gay and the love interest of Maek. |
| 2020 | My Engineer | Tencent Video | Frong | Shane Nutchapol | Frong is gay and the love interest of Thara. |
| 2020 | My Engineer | Tencent Video | Thara | Nutthapong Phibunthanakiet | Thara is gay and the love interest of Frong. |
| 2020–2022 | Mystic | CBBC; TVNZ | Caleb Burford | Joshua Tan | Caleb comes out as gay. |
| 2020–2025 | Mythic Quest | Apple TV+ | Rachel | Ashly Burch | Rachel and Dana are in a romantic relationship. |
| 2020–2025 | Mythic Quest | Apple TV+ | Dana | Imani Hakim | Rachel and Dana are in a romantic relationship. |
| 2020–2023 | Never Have I Ever | Netflix | Fabiola Torres | Lee Rodriguez | Fabiola is lesbian. |
| 2020–2023 | Never Have I Ever | Netflix | Eve | Christina Kartchner | Eve is lesbian and Fabiola's love interest. |
| 2020–2023 | Never Have I Ever | Netflix | Jonah Sharpe | Dino Petrera | Jonah is a gay high school student. |
| 2020–2021 | Nurses | Global | Ashley Collins | Natasha Calis | Ashley is a lesbian and a nurse. |
| 2020–2021 | Nurses | Global | Caro | Alexandra Ordolis | Caro, a paramedic, is lesbian and Ashley's love interest. |
| 2020 | October Faction | Netflix | Geoff Allen | Gabriel Darku | Geoff is openly gay. |
| 2020 | October Faction | Netflix | Phillip Mishra | Praneet Akilla | Phillip is a closeted gay teenager, and in a relationship with Geoff. |
| 2020– | P-Valley | Starz | Uncle Clifford | Nicco Annan | Cliff is queer and gender fluid. She is the owner of the strip club, where the show is based around. |
| 2020– | P-Valley | Starz | Lil Murda | J. Alphonse Nicholson | Lil Murda is still trying to figure out his sexuality. He is involved in a gay sex scene with Uncle Clifford in season 1, episode 4. |
| 2020 | Party of Five | Freeform | Matthew | Garcia | Matthew is a trans man. |
| 2020 | Penny Dreadful: City of Angels | Showtime | Rio (Reina) | Natalie Dormer | Rio is bisexual and queen of Fly Rico's gang. She is one of Magda's shapeshifter forms. The show was canceled after one season. |
| 2020 | Penny Dreadful: City of Angels | Showtime | Mateo Vega | Johnathan Nieves | Mateo is involved in a threesome with Fly Rico and Rio. |
| 2020 | Penny Dreadful: City of Angels | Showtime | Fly Rico | Sebastian Chacon | Fly is involved in a threesome with Mateo Vega and Rio. |
| 2020 | Penny Dreadful: City of Angels | Showtime | Charlton Townsend | Michael Gladis | Charlton is a closeted gay. |
| 2020 | Penny Dreadful: City of Angels | Showtime | Kurt | Dominic Sherwood | Kurt is a closeted gay. |
| 2020–2023 | Perry Mason | HBO | Della Street | Juliet Rylance | Della is the legal secretary of one of the titular character's clients. She and Hazel are in a relationship. |
| 2020–2023 | Perry Mason | HBO | Hazel Prystock | Molly Ephraim | Della is the legal secretary of one of the titular character's clients. She and Hazel are in a relationship. |
| 2020–2024 | Power Book II: Ghost | Starz | Dru Tejada | Lovell Adams-Gray | Dru is gay. |
| 2020–2024 | Power Book II: Ghost | Starz | Effie Morales | Alix Lapri | Effie is bisexual |
| 2020 | The Queen's Gambit | Netflix | D.L. Townes | Jacob Fortune-Lloyd | Townes is gay. |
| 2020–2023 | Ragnarok | Netflix | Isolde Eidsvoll | Ylva Bjørkaas Thedin | Isolde is a lesbian. |
| 2020–2023 | Ragnarok | Netflix | Laurits Seier | Jonas Strand Gravli | Laurits is bisexual |
| 2020 | Ratched | Netflix | Mildred Ratched | Sarah Paulson | Mildred is bisexual, and a nurse at fictional Lucia State Hospital psychiatric asylum. She has sexual relations with a private detective staying at her motel. Then after meeting Gwedolyn Briggs, they start dating in secret. |
| 2020 | Ratched | Netflix | Gwendolyn Briggs | Cynthia Nixon | Gwedolyn is a lesbian, and personal assistant to the Governor. She becomes interested in Mildred and takes her to a lesbian bar. They later start dating. |
| 2020 | Ratched | Netflix | Ingrid | Harriet Sansom Harris | Ingrid is staying at the hospital for depression. She undergoes a lobotomy which has the unintended side-effect of bringing out lesbian desires. They then use hydrotherapy to try to cure her lesbianism. |
| 2020 | Ratched | Netflix | Lily Cartwright | Annie Starke | Lily is a lesbian, being treated at the hospital for her lesbianism. She is given a lobotomy and when that doesn't work, undergoes hydrotherapy. |
| 2020 | Reality Z | Netflix | Nina | Ana Hartmann | Nina is bisexual. She's in a polyamorous relationship with Roberta and Lucas. |
| 2020 | Reality Z | Netflix | Madonna | Wallie Ruy | Madonna is a trans woman. |
| 2020 | Reality Z | Netflix | Roberta | Mariah de Moraes | Roberta is bisexual and in a relationship with Nina and Lucas. |
| 2020–2022 | Snowpiercer | TNT | Bess Till | Mickey Sumner | Bess is lesbian. Bess and Jinju are a couple. |
| 2020–2022 | Snowpiercer | TNT | Jinju Seong | Susan Park | Jinju is lesbian. |
| 2020 | Someone Has to Die | Netflix | Gabino Falcón | Alejandro Speitzer | Gabino is gay. |
| 2020 | Someone Has to Die | Netflix | Alonso Aldama | Carlos Cuevas | Alonso is a closeted gay. |
| 2020 | Soulmates | AMC | Mateo | Bill Skarsgård | Mateo is gay. |
| 2020 | Soulmates | AMC | Jonah | Nathan Stewart-Jarrett | Jonah is gay. |
| 2020–2023 | Star Trek: Picard | CBS All Access | Seven of Nine | Jeri Ryan | Seven is pansexual. At the end of Season One she had begun a relationship with Raffi. Seven of Nine was introduced in Star Trek: Voyager. |
| 2020–2023 | Star Trek: Picard | CBS All Access | Raffi Musiker | Michelle Hurd | Raffi is bisexual and a former Starfleet officer, but she quit after the fiasco of the Romulan rescue. She is estranged from her biological family. At the end of Season One she had begun a relationship with Seven of Nine. |
| 2020–2023 | Star Trek: Picard | CBS All Access | Bjayzl | Necar Zadegan | Bjayzl is pansexual, and a criminal businesswoman. She was known for brutalizing former Borg drones, extracting their implants, and selling them on the black market. |
| 2020–2022 | Summertime | Netflix | Sofia | Amanda Campana | Sofia is lesbian. |
| 2020 | Tales from the Loop | Amazon Prime Video | Gaddis | Ato Essandoh | Gaddis is gay and in love with Alex in an alternate reality. But he ends up with Kent, once he returns to his own reality. In season 1, episode 6, "Parallel". |
| 2020 | Tales from the Loop | Amazon Prime Video | Gaddis 2.0 | Kevin Harris | Gaddis 2.0 is gay and part of an alternate reality for Gaddis. |
| 2020 | Tales from the Loop | Amazon Prime Video | Alex | Jon Kartajarena | Alex is gay and is in a brief relationship with Gaddis 2.0. |
| 2020 | Tales from the Loop | Amazon Prime Video | Kent | Brian Maillard | Both alternate versions of Kent are shown to be flirting with Gaddis. |
| 2020 | Teenage Bounty Hunters | Netflix | Sterling | Maddie Phillips | Sterling is bisexual. She dated Luke in the beginning of the series and after their breakup falls in love with April. |
| 2020 | Teenage Bounty Hunters | Netflix | April | Devon Hales | April identifies as a lesbian but is still in the closet. After Sterling kisses April, they begin a relationship. |
| 2020 | Teenage Bounty Hunters | Netflix | Jocelyn Durbin | Jillana Darby | Jocelyn is bisexual, and in a throuple with Gary and Tina. |
| 2020 | Teenage Bounty Hunters | Netflix | Tina | Heather Hayes | Tina is bisexual, and in a throuple with Gary and Jocelyn. |
| 2020 | Tiny Pretty Things | Netflix | Shane McRae | Brennan Clost | Shane is openly gay and confident and comfortable in his sexuality. He is a student at fictional Archer School of Ballet in Chicago. The show is based on the novel of the same name by Sona Charaipotra and Dhonielle Clayton. |
| 2020 | Tiny Pretty Things | Netflix | Oren Lennox | Barton Cowperthwaite | Oren is struggling with body dysmorphia, while questioning his sexuality. He also attends the ballet school and is Shane's roommate, who he is sleeping with. |
| 2020 | Tiny Pretty Things | Netflix | Isabel Cruz | Jess Salgueiro | Isabel is lesbian and was a soldier. During her tours, she met and fell in love with Zoe Estrella. After returning home, they got married. |
| 2020 | Tiny Pretty Things | Netflix | Topher Brooks | Shaun Benson | Topher is a gay ballet master at the school and is married to Alan Renfrew. |
| 2020 | Tiny Pretty Things | Netflix | Alan Renfrew | Morgan Kelly | Alan (aka Gears) is the ballet school's sports medicine expert and married to Topher Brooks. |
| 2020 | Tiny Pretty Things | Netflix | Dev Ranaweera | Josh Pyman | Dev is a gay businessman, with connections to the ballet school, and becomes Shane's new lover. |
| 2020 | Tiny Pretty Things | Netflix | Zoe Estrella | Alexandra Augustine | Zoe is lesbian and met Isabel while on duty in Afghanistan. They fell in love and got married. Zoe was unable to shake the memories of what happened and killed herself. She is only seen in flashbacks. |
| 2020 | Tommy | CBS | Abigail "Tommy" Thomas | Edie Falco | Abigail is a lesbian and the first female Chief of Police for the Los Angeles Police Department. |
| 2020 | Tommy | CBS | Kiley Mills | Katrina Lenk | Kiley is lesbian and Tommy's romantic interest. |
| 2020–2021 | Twenties | BET | Hattie | Jonica T. Gibbs | Hattie is a lesbian writer. |
| 2020–2021 | Twenties | BET | Ida B. | Sophina Brown | Ida is bi-curious, and Hattie's boss. Hattie and Ida are starting a relationship. |
| 2020–2021 | Twenties | BET | Chuck | Jevon McFerrin | Chuck is bisexual. |
| 2020 | Utopia Falls | Hulu | Brooklyn 2 | Humberly González | Brooklyn is fluid and interested in learning more about Sage. They are in a romantic relationship. |
| 2020 | Utopia Falls | Hulu | Sage 5 | Devyn Nekoda | Sage's sexuality is undefined, and she is in a relationship with Brooklyn. |
| 2020 | Vagrant Queen | Syfy | Elida Al-Feyr | Adriyan Rae | Elida is pansexual, and a former queen turned scavenger. When Elida first meets Amae, she interrupts a sexual encounter between Amae and a woman. Elida and Amae are love interests. |
| 2020 | Vagrant Queen | Syfy | Amae Rali | Alex McGregor | Amae is pansexual and a skilled mechanic and pilot. Elida and Amae are love interests. |
| 2020– | Van der Valk | ITV | Lucienne Hassell | Maimie McCoy | Lucienne is lesbian. She has sometimes spent a night on Simon Van der Valk's houseboat. When their colleague Brad sees them together one morning, he starts a salacious gossip about them. After her ex-girlfriend returned the keys to Lucienne's apartment, the team is at their bar hangout and Lucienne confronts Brad about his spreading rumors knowing that she batted for the other team (season 1, episode 2, "Only in Amsterdam"). |
| 2020 | Veneno | Atresplayer Premium | Cristina Ortiz "La Veneno" | Jedet, Daniela Santiago, Isabel Torres | Cristina Ortiz, "La Veneno" is a trans woman. |
| 2020 | Veneno | Atresplayer Premium | Valeria Vegas | Lola Rodríguez | Valeria Vegas is a trans woman and a Cristina fan. |
| 2020 | Veneno | Atresplayer Premium | Paca la Piraña | Paca la Piraña, Desireé Rodríguez | Paca la Piraña is a trans woman and a sex worker. |
| 2020–2021 | The Walking Dead: World Beyond | AMC | Felix Carlucci | Nico Tortorella | Felix is gay and a security officer at Campus Colony. |
| 2020–2021 | The Walking Dead: World Beyond | AMC | Will Campbell | Jelani Alladin | Will is gay and Felix's boyfriend. |
| 2020–2022 | Warrior Nun | Netflix | Sister Beatrice | Kristina Tonteri-Young | Beatrice is lesbian. |
| 2020–2024 | We Are Five | Globoplay | Heloísa "Lica" Gutierrez | Manoela Aliperti | Lica is ___, and a student and artist. She is the daughter of a wealthy family and is also an activist. |
| 2020–2024 | We Are Five | Globoplay | Samantha Lambertini | Giovanna Grigio | Samantha is bisexual, and a book publisher. She is Lica's ex-girlfriend, but the two are still in love. |
| 2020–2024 | We Are Five | Globoplay | Augusto "Guto" Sampaio Neto | Bruno Gadiol | Guto is a closeted gay man but comes out later in the series. |
| 2020–2024 | We Are Five | Globoplay | Miguel | Marcos Oliveira | Miguel is openly gay and performs as drag queen 'Michele Esmeralda'. |
| 2020–2024 | We Are Five | Globoplay | Alice | Dirá Paes | Alice is a lesbian journalist who gets involved with Lica. |
| 2020–2024 | We Are Five | Globoplay | Cristina "Tina" Yamada | Ana Hikari | Tina is bisexual. |
| 2020–2024 | We Are Five | Globoplay | Catarina | Julia Terron | Catarina is bisexual and hooks up with Lica. |
| 2020–2024 | We Are Five | Globoplay | Renata | Deborá Rodrigues | Renata is lesbian and is Samantha's girlfriend. |
| 2020–2024 | We Are Five | Globoplay | Erica | Renata Guida | Erica is lesbian and engaged to Alice. |
| 2020 | We Are Who We Are | HBO; Sky Atlantic | Sarah Wilson | Chloë Sevigny | Sarah and Maggie are a married lesbian couple. |
| 2020 | We Are Who We Are | HBO; Sky Atlantic | Maggie Teixeira | Alice Braga | Sarah and Maggie are a married lesbian couple. |
| 2020 | Where Your Eyes Linger | Rakuten Viki | Han Tae-joo | Han Gi-chan | Tae-joo is gay and the only heir of a chaebol family. He is involved with his gay bodyguard, Kang-gook. |
| 2020 | Where Your Eyes Linger | Rakuten Viki | Kang-gook | Jang Eui-soo | Kang-gook is gay and the bodyguard for Han Tae-joo. They are romantically involved. |
| 2020 | White Lines | Netflix | Kika Calafat | Marta Milans | Kika is bisexual. |
| 2020 | White Lines | Netflix | Sissy | Geena Román | Sissy is bisexual and works at the club and has a sort of relationship with Kika. |
| 2020 | Why R U? | One 31; Line TV | Zon | Tommy Sittichok | Why R U? is a Thai boys' love drama television series. The show features 12 characters that identify as gay or bisexual. Zon is bisexual. Saifah is bisexual. Zon and Saifah are love interests. |
| 2020 | Why R U? | One 31; Line TV | Saifah | Jimmy Karn | Why R U? is a Thai boys' love drama television series. The show features 12 characters that identify as gay or bisexual. Zon is bisexual. Saifah is bisexual. Zon and Saifah are love interests. |
| 2020 | Why R U? | One 31; Line TV | Tutor | Saint Suppapong | Tutor is gay. Fighter is gay. Tutor and Fighter are love interests. |
| 2020 | Why R U? | One 31; Line TV | Fighter | Zee Pruk | Tutor is gay. Fighter is gay. Tutor and Fighter are love interests. |
| 2020 | Why R U? | One 31; Line TV | Zen | Toy Thanapat | Zen has a crush in Zon, but it's one-sided. He later became love interest with Natee. |
| 2020 | Why R U? | One 31; Line TV | Natee | Tonnam Piamchon | Zen has a crush in Zon, but it's one-sided. He later became love interest with Natee. |
| 2020 | Why R U? | One 31; Line TV | Japan | Park Parnupat | Japan and Tanthai are love interests. |
| 2020 | Why R U? | One 31; Line TV | Tanthai | Seng Wichai | Japan and Tanthai are love interests. |
| 2020 | Why R U? | One 31; Line TV | Dew | Max Saran | Dew and Blue are love interests, with Champ possibly having a crush on Blue. |
| 2020 | Why R U? | One 31; Line TV | Blue | Nat Natasitt | Dew and Blue are love interests, with Champ possibly having a crush on Blue. |
| 2020 | Why R U? | One 31; Line TV | Champ | Mark Sorntast | Dew and Blue are love interests, with Champ possibly having a crush on Blue. |
| 2020 | Why R U? | One 31; Line TV | Luktan | Taralatah | Luktan is a transgender woman. |
| 2020–2022 | The Wilds | Amazon Prime Video | Toni Shalifoe | Erana James | Toni is lesbian. Toni and Shelby start off hating each other, but in time they grow closer and eventually start a relationship. During flashbacks we see Toni and Regan's past relationship. |
| 2020–2022 | The Wilds | Amazon Prime Video | Shelby Goodkind | Mia Healey | Shelby is lesbian. |
| 2020–2022 | The Wilds | Amazon Prime Video | Regan | Bella Shepard | Regan is lesbian and Toni's ex-girlfriend. |
| 2020–2021 | Zoey's Extraordinary Playlist | NBC | Mo | Alex Newell | Mo is Zoey's gay, gender non-conforming neighbor and DJ who tries to help her understand the extent of her power. |
| 2020–2021 | Zoey's Extraordinary Playlist | NBC | Eddie | Patrick Ortiz | Eddie is gay and Mo's love interest. |

== 2021 ==
| Year | Show | Network | Character | Actor | Notes |
|---|---|---|---|---|---|
| 2021 | Brand New Cherry Flavor | Netflix | Lisa Nova | Rosa Salazar | Nova is bisexual. |
| 2021–2024 | Chucky | USA; Syfy | Jake | Zackary Arthur | Jake is gay and is in a relationship with Devon. |
| 2021–2024 | Chucky | USA; Syfy | Devon | Bjorgvin Arnarson | Devon is in a relationship with Jake. |
| 2021–2024 | Chucky | USA; Syfy | Nica Peirce | Fiona Dourif | Nica and Tiffany are lovers. |
| 2021–2024 | Chucky | USA; Syfy | Tiffany Valentine | Jennifer Tilly | Nica and Tiffany are lovers. |
| 2021 | Cowboy Bebop | Netflix | Faye Valentine | Daniella Pineda | Faye Valentine is bisexual. |
| 2021–2023 | Cruel Summer | Freeform | Kate Wallis | Olivia Holt | Kate is sapphic and in a relationship with Mallory. |
| 2021–2023 | Cruel Summer | Freeform | Mallory Higgins | Harley Quinn Smith | Mallory is lesbian and in relationship with Kate. |
| 2021–2023 | Cruel Summer | Freeform | Vince Fuller | Allius Barnes | Vince is gay and dating Ben. |
| 2021–2023 | Cruel Summer | Freeform | Ben Hallowell | Nathaniel Ashton | Ben is gay and dating Vince. |
| 2021 | Dopesick | Hulu | Betsy Mallum | Kaitlyn Dever | Mallum, a young closeted lesbian girl who is desperate to leave her small town to be free to be herself. She is in a romantic relationship with Pell. |
| 2021 | Dopesick | Hulu | Grace Pell | Cleopatra Coleman | Mallum, a young closeted lesbian girl who is desperate to leave her small town to be free to be herself. She is in a romantic relationship with Pell. |
| 2021–2025 | The Equalizer | CBS | Viola "Aunt Vi" Marsette | Lorraine Toussaint | Aunt Vi is bisexual. She has an ex-girlfriend during college and also uses dating apps for seeking men. |
| 2021–2022 | Fate: The Winx Saga | Netflix | Dane | Theo Graham | Dane is queer. He is interested in Riven and Beatrix. |
| 2021– | Foundation | Apple TV+ | Bel Riose | Ben Daniels | Bel is a disgraced general of the Empire who was reinstated to lead a mission to Terminus. Glawen is his husband and second-in-command. |
| 2021– | Foundation | Apple TV+ | Glawen Curr | Dino Fetscher | Bel is a disgraced general of the Empire who was reinstated to lead a mission to Terminus. Glawen is his husband and second-in-command. |
| 2021 | Generation | HBO Max | Greta | Haley Sanchez | Greta is asexual, and has a crush on Riley. |
| 2021 | Generation | HBO Max | Nathan | Uly Schlesinger | Nathan is bisexual, and hooks up with his sister's boyfriend at a party. |
| 2021 | Generation | HBO Max | Chester | Justice Smith | Chester is gay. |
| 2021 | Generation | HBO Max | Sam | Nathan Stewart-Jarrett | Sam is gay and the school guidance counselor. |
| 2021 | Generation | HBO Max | Riley | Chase Sui Wonders | Riley is bisexual. She makes out with Pablo (Anthony Keyvan) at the aquarium and gives him a hand job in season 1, episode "Toasted". When the student's bus breaks down on a trip to San Francisco, they are forced to stay at a local motel. Riley and Greta are assigned a room together. Riley and Greta kiss, and when Riley starts to undress to have sex with Greta, she freaks out and says "I don't hook up", which leads to Riley storming out of the room, in season 1, episode "Desert Island". |
| 2021 | Generation | HBO Max | Lucia (Luz) | Marisela Zumbado | Luz is queer. Luz hooks up with Riley (after being rejected by Greta), at the motel they are staying at, when their bus breaks down on a trip to San Francisco, in season 1, episode "Desert Island". |
| 2021 | Generation | HBO Max | Joe | J. August Richards | Joe and Patrick are married |
| 2021 | Generation | HBO Max | Patrick | John Ross Bowie | Joe and Patrick are married |
| 2021 | Generation | HBO Max | Hookup Guy (Garrett) | Isai Torres | Chester hooks up with 'Garrett' through a dating app, while they're out of school for an air quality day. Garrett gives Chester oral sex. |
| 2021– | Ginny & Georgia | Netflix | Maxine "Max" Baker | Sara Waisglass | Maxine is lesbian and Ginny's friend. |
| 2021–2023 | Gossip Girl | HBO Max | Max Wolfe | Thomas Doherty | Max is pansexual. By the end of episode 6, he has a threesome with Audrey and Aki. |
| 2021–2023 | Gossip Girl | HBO Max | Akeno "Aki" Menzies | Evan Mock | Aki is Audrey's bisexual boyfriend. By the end of episode 6, he has a threesome with Audrey and Max. |
| 2021–2023 | Gossip Girl | HBO Max | Monet De Haan | Savannah Lee Smith | Monet is a lesbian. |
| 2021–2023 | Gossip Girl | HBO Max | Rafael "Rafa" Caparros | Jason Gotay | Rafa used to hook up with Max. |
| 2021–2023 | Gossip Girl | HBO Max | Gideon Wolfe | Todd Almond | Gideon is a cisgender gay male who expresses himself through his femininity. |
| 2021–2023 | Gossip Girl | HBO Max | Luna La | Zión Moreno | Luna is a trans woman. |
| 2021–2023 | Gossip Girl | HBO Max | Roy Sachs | John Benjamin Hickey | Roy is married to Gideon. |
| 2021 | Halston | Netflix | Halston | Ewan McGregor | Halston is gay. |
| 2021 | Hawkeye | Disney+ | Wendy | Adetinpo Thomas | Wendy is a New York Police Department officer who has a wife. |
| 2021 | I Know What You Did Last Summer | Amazon Prime Video | Allison | Madison Iseman | Allison is bisexual, and she is dating Margot. |
| 2021 | I Know What You Did Last Summer | Amazon Prime Video | Margot | Brianne Tju | Margot is lesbian, and she is dating Allison. |
| 2021 | I Know What You Did Last Summer | Amazon Prime Video | Johnny | Sebastian Amoruso | Johnny is gay. |
| 2021–2023 | iCarly | Paramount+ | Harper | Laci Mosley | Harper is pansexual, and she is dating Double Dutch. |
| 2021–2023 | iCarly | Paramount+ | Double Dutch | Poppy Liu | Double Dutch is a sapphic pop singer, and she is dating Harper. |
| 2021– | Invasion | Apple TV+ | Yamato Mitsuki | Shioli Kutsuna | Yamato and Hinata are lovers. |
| 2021– | Invasion | Apple TV+ | Hinata Murai | Rinko Kikuchi | Yamato and Hinata are lovers. |
| 2021 | The Irregulars | Netflix | Dr. Watson | Royce Pierreson | Watson is gay and in love with Sherlock Holmes. |
| 2021 | It's a Sin | Channel 4 | Ritchie Tozer | Olly Alexander | Ritchie is gay, who moves to London to start his law degree. The series follows three young gay men and flatmates in 1980s London who have their lives turned upside down by the AIDS crisis. |
| 2021 | It's a Sin | Channel 4 | Roscoe Babatunde | Omari Douglas | Roscoe is gay and 18 years old. His Nigerian family disown him when he comes out. |
| 2021 | It's a Sin | Channel 4 | Colin Morris-Jones | Callum Scott Howells | Colin is gay and moves to London with the hopes of becoming a Savile Row tailor. |
| 2021 | It's a Sin | Channel 4 | Ash Mukherjee | Nathaniel Curtis | Ash is gay, and Ritchie has a crush on him. |
| 2021 | It's a Sin | Channel 4 | Henry Coltrane | Neil Patrick Harris | Henry is a gay British tailor who lives with his gay partner. |
| 2021–2022 | Kevin Can F**k Himself | AMC | Patricia "Patty" Deirdre O'Connor | Mary Hollis Inboden | Patty and Tammy start dating. |
| 2021–2022 | Kevin Can F**k Himself | AMC | Tammy Ridgeway | Candice Coke | Patty and Tammy start dating. |
| 2021–2023 | Kung Fu | The CW | Ryan Shen | Jon Prasida | Ryan is gay and a quick-witted medical student who has to deal with the sudden return of his estranged older sister, Nicky (Olivia Liang). |
| 2021–2023 | Kung Fu | The CW | Joe Harper | Bradley Gibson | Joe Harper is a SF Bay Area LGBTQ social activist who has a short romance with Ryan (Season 1) |
| 2021–2023 | Kung Fu | The CW | Sebastian Cailao | JB Tadena | Sebastian is a chief at the Harmony Dumplings restaurant and Ryan's love interest (Season 2- ) |
| 2021 | Leonardo | Rai 1 | Leonardo da Vinci | Aidan Turner | Leonardo, the protagonist and lead role, is homosexual. |
| 2021–2025 | Leverage: Redemption | Amazon Freevee | Maurice | C.J. LeBlanc | Maurice is a gay character in the 9th episode of the 1st season. |
| 2021–2025 | Leverage: Redemption | Amazon Freevee | Stella Voleur | Joanna Cassidy | Stella and Josephine are married (S1.E11). |
| 2021–2025 | Leverage: Redemption | Amazon Freevee | Josephine | Helen Sadler | Stella and Josephine are married (S1.E11). |
| 2021–2025 | Leverage: Redemption | Amazon Freevee | Breanna Casey | Aleyse Shannon | Breanna is one of the main character and was dating Emily. |
| 2021–2025 | Leverage: Redemption | Amazon Freevee | Emily Yoo | Aury Krebs | Breanna is one of the main character and was dating Emily. |
| 2021 | Light on Me | Viki, WeTV, AbemaTV | Woo Tae-kyung | Lee Sae-on | Tae-kyung had a crush on Da-on at first but ended up with Shin-woo at the end of the series. |
| 2021 | Light on Me | Viki, WeTV, AbemaTV | Noh Shin-woo | Kang You-seok | Shin-woo is in love with Tae-kyung. |
| 2021 | Light on Me | Viki, WeTV, AbemaTV | Shin Da-on | Choe Chan-yi | Da-on realised he had feeling for Tae-kyung at the end of the series. |
| 2021–2023 | Loki | Disney+ | Loki | Tom Hiddleston | Loki is bisexual. |
| 2021–2023 | Loki | Disney+ | Sylvie | Sophia Di Martino | Sylvie is bisexual. |
| 2021 | The Long Call | ITV | Matthew Venn | Ben Aldridge | Matthew is a gay detective. Matthew and Jonathan are married. |
| 2021 | The Long Call | ITV | Jonathan Roberts | Declan Bennett | Matthew is a gay detective. Matthew and Jonathan are married. |
| 2021 | My Love Mix-Up! | TV Asahi, Viki | Sota Aoki | Shunsuke Michieda | Aoki and Ida are the main characters and in love with each other. |
| 2021 | My Love Mix-Up! | TV Asahi, Viki | Kōsuke Ida | Ren Meguro | Aoki and Ida are the main characters and in love with each other. |
| 2021–2024 | NCIS: Hawaiʻi | CBS | Lucy Tara | Yasmine Al-Bustami | Lucy is a junior field agent of the NCIS. Kate is a Special Agent of the DIA. They are both romantically involved with each other. |
| 2021–2024 | NCIS: Hawaiʻi | CBS | Kate Whistler | Tori Anderson | Lucy is a junior field agent of the NCIS. Kate is a Special Agent of the DIA. They are both romantically involved with each other. |
| 2021 | The Nevers | HBO Max | Hugo Swann | James Norton | Hugo Swann is pansexual. |
| 2021 | The Nevers | HBO Max | Frank Mundi | Ben Chaplin | Mundi is gay and revealed to have had a past affair with Swann. |
| 2021– | Nine Perfect Strangers | Hulu | Lars Lee | Luke Evans | Lars is gay. |
| 2021–2022 | One of Us Is Lying | Peacock | Janae | Jess McLeod | Janae is gender-fluid and a lesbian . Maeve is sapphic, and they were/are dating. |
| 2021–2022 | One of Us Is Lying | Peacock | Maeve | Melissa Collazo | Janae is gender-fluid and a lesbian . Maeve is sapphic, and they were/are dating. |
| 2021–2022 | One of Us Is Lying | Peacock | Cooper | Chibuikem Uche | Kris and Cooper are gay and in a secret relationship. |
| 2021–2022 | One of Us Is Lying | Peacock | Kris | Karim Diane | Kris and Cooper are gay and in a secret relationship. |
| 2021- | Only Murders in the Building | Hulu | Mabel Mora | Selena Gomez | Mabel is bisexual, and she was dating Alice Banks. |
| 2021- | Only Murders in the Building | Hulu | Sazz Pataki | Jane Lynch | Sazz is homosexual. She is shot and killed at the end of season three. Jan is bisexual, and they were dating. |
| 2021- | Only Murders in the Building | Hulu | Jan Bellows | Amy Ryan | Sazz is homosexual. She is shot and killed at the end of season three. Jan is bisexual, and they were dating. |
| 2021 | Ossan's Love | ViuTV | "KK" Chak Kwok Keung | Kenny Wong | Tin entered a love triangle with his boss KK and his co-worker and flatmate Muk. |
| 2021 | Ossan's Love | ViuTV | "Muk" Ling Siu Muk | Anson Lo | Tin entered a love triangle with his boss KK and his co-worker and flatmate Muk. |
| 2021 | Ossan's Love | ViuTV | "Tin" Tin Yat Hung | Edan Lui | Tin entered a love triangle with his boss KK and his co-worker and flatmate Muk. |
| 2021– | Un professore | Rai 1 | Simone Balestra | Nicolas Maupas | Simone is gay and in love with Manuel. |
| 2021–2025 | The Sex Lives of College Girls | HBO MAX | Leighton Murray | Reneé Rapp | A closeted lesbian who comes out at the end of season 1. |
| 2021–2025 | The Sex Lives of College Girls | HBO MAX | Bela | Amrit Kaur | Bela is bisexual. |
| 2021–2025 | The Sex Lives of College Girls | HBO MAX | Alicia | Midori Francis | Alicia is the love interest of Leighton in season 1. |
| 2021–2025 | The Sex Lives of College Girls | HBO MAX | Tova | Vico Ortiz | Tova is non-binary. |
| 2021–2025 | The Sex Lives of College Girls | HBO MAX | Tatum | Gracie Dzienny | Tatum is the love interest of Leighton in season 2. |
| 2021–2023 | Shadow and Bone | Netflix | Jesper Fahey | Kit Young | Jesper is bisexual. |
| 2021–2023 | Shadow and Bone | Netflix | Fedyor Kaminsky | Julian Kostov | Fedyor and Ivan are in a romantic relationship. |
| 2021–2023 | Shadow and Bone | Netflix | Ivan | Simon Sears | Fedyor and Ivan are in a romantic relationship. |
| 2021–2023 | Shadow and Bone | Netflix | Nadia Zhabin | Gabrielle Brooks | Nadia is queer. |
| 2021–2023 | Sky Rojo | Netflix | Wendy | Lali Esposito | Wendy is a lesbian. |
| 2021–2025 | Squid Game | Netflix | Cho Hyun-ju | Park Sung-hoon | Hyun-ju is a trans woman who joins the Squid Game to support her gender-affirming surgery and move to Thailand as a Kathoey. |
| 2021–2022 | Station Eleven | HBO Max | Kirsten Raymonde | Mackenzie Davis | At one point, Raymonde mentioned she once dated a woman in the past. |
| 2021–2026 | The Upshaws | Netflix | Bernard Upshaw Jr. | Jermelle Simon | Bernard is a closeted gay man, who comes out near the end of season 1. |
| 2021–2026 | The Upshaws | Netflix | Hector | Dewayne Perkins | Hector is gay and the love interest of Bernard. |
| 2021–2024 | Walker | The CW | Liam Walker | Keegan Allen | Liam is gay and Cordell Walker's brother. |
| 2021 | We Best Love | Tencent Video | Gao Shide | Sam Lin | Shide and Shuyi are the main characters and in love with each other. |
| 2021 | We Best Love | Tencent Video | Zhou Shuyi | Yang Yu Teng | Shide and Shuyi are the main characters and in love with each other. |
| 2021 | We Best Love | Tencent Video | Pei Shouyi | Ray Chang | Zhenxuan has had a history with Shouyi. They are dating at the end of the series. |
| 2021 | We Best Love | Tencent Video | Yu Zhenxuan | Shih Chihtian | Zhenxuan has had a history with Shouyi. They are dating at the end of the series. |
| 2021 | We Best Love | Tencent Video | Shi Zheyu | Richard Lee | Bingwei has a crush on Zheyu. They get married at the end of the series. |
| 2021 | We Best Love | Tencent Video | Liu Bingwei | Evan Luo | Bingwei has a crush on Zheyu. They get married at the end of the series. |
| 2021–2025 | The Wheel of Time | Amazon Prime Video | Moiraine Damodred | Rosamund Pike | Moiraine and Siuan are both Aes Sedai of the White Tower. They were in a relationship. |
| 2021–2025 | The Wheel of Time | Amazon Prime Video | Siuan Sanche | Sophie Okonedo | Moiraine and Siuan are both Aes Sedai of the White Tower. They were in a relationship. |
| 2021– | The White Lotus (Season 1) | HBO | Armond | Murray Bartlett | Armond and Dillon were gay. They were fling. |
| 2021– | The White Lotus (Season 1) | HBO | Dillon | Lukas Gage | Armond and Dillon were gay. They were fling. |
| 2021–2023 | With Love | Amazon Prime Video | Jorge Diaz Jr | Mark Indelicato | Jorge is Gay and Gender Non-Conforming, he is in a relationship with Henry. |
| 2021–2023 | With Love | Amazon Prime Video | Henry | Vincent Rodriguez III | Henry is Jorge's Boyfriend. |
| 2021–2023 | With Love | Amazon Prime Video | Sol Perez | Isis King | Sol is trans and non-binary, They are also in a relationship with Miles who has a non-binary child. |
| 2021–2023 | With Love | Amazon Prime Video | Charlie Murphy | Birdie Silverstein | Charlie is a non-binary 13-year-old kid. |
| 2021– | Yellowjackets | Showtime | Taissa Turner | Tawny Cypress (adult) / Jasmin Savoy Brown (teen) | Taissa was in a relationship with Van in her teenage years and is married to Simone as an adult. |
| 2021– | Yellowjackets | Showtime | Vanessa "Van" Palmer | Lauren Ambrose (adult) / Liv Hewson (teen) | Van dated Taissa in her teenage years. |
| 2021– | Yellowjackets | Showtime | Simone Abara | Rukiya Bernard | Simone is married to Taissa in the present. |
| 2021– 2024 | Young Royals | Netflix | Wilhelm | Edvin Ryding | Wilhelm is the lead character, a young Swedish prince who falls in love with Simon while at boarding school. They pursue a romance in secret, but he struggles to reconcile his love with his family and the world's expectations of him. |
| 2021– 2024 | Young Royals | Netflix | Simon | Omar Rudberg | Simon is gay. He falls in love with Wilhelm and finds the heavy expectations Wilhelm is under difficult. |

== 2022 ==
| Year | Show | Network | Character | Actor | Notes |
|---|---|---|---|---|---|
| 2022–2025 | Andor | Disney+ | Vel Sartha | Faye Marsay | Vel is the leader of a team of rebels. Cinta is her girlfriend. |
| 2022–2025 | Andor | Disney+ | Cinta Kaz | Varada Sethu | Vel is the leader of a team of rebels. Cinta is her girlfriend. |
| 2022 | The Bastard Son & The Devil Himself | Netflix | Nathan Byrne | Jay Lycurgo | Nathan is bisexual and romantically involved with both Annalise and Gabriel. |
| 2022 | The Bastard Son & The Devil Himself | Netflix | Gabriel | Emilien Vekemans | Gabriel is queer. |
| 2022–2025 | Big Boys | Channel 4 | Jack Rooke | Dylan Llewellyn | Jack is the main character and a closeted gay student. |
| 2022–2025 | Big Boys | Channel 4 | Yemi | Olisa Odele | Yemi is a gay fashion student who accompanies Jack as he tries to explore his sexuality at university. |
| 2022 | The Fame Game | Netflix | Avinash Anand | Lakshvir Saran | Avinash and Samar are gay and are lovers. |
| 2022 | The Fame Game | Netflix | Samar | Danish Sood | Avinash and Samar are gay and are lovers. |
| 2022 | The Fame Game | Netflix | Shobha Trivedi | Rajshri Deshpande | Police officer investigating Anamika's case. Lesbian; she has a partner, Sheila, and together they are fighting for the custody of Sheila's son. |
| 2022 | The Fame Game | Netflix | Sheila | Anindita Bose | Police officer investigating Anamika's case. Lesbian; she has a partner, Sheila, and together they are fighting for the custody of Sheila's son. |
| 2022– | Heartstopper | Netflix | Nick Nelson | Kit Connor | Nick is bisexual, and he is dating Charlie. |
| 2022– | Heartstopper | Netflix | Charlie Spring | Joe Locke | Charlie is gay, and he is dating Nick. |
| 2022– | Heartstopper | Netflix | Elle Argent | Yasmin Finney | Elle is a transgender girl. |
| 2022– | Heartstopper | Netflix | Tara Jones | Corinna Brown | Tara is lesbian, and she is dating Darcy. |
| 2022– | Heartstopper | Netflix | Darcy Olsson | Kizzy Edgell | Darcy is non-binary with interests in women, and they is dating Tara. |
| 2022– | Heartstopper | Netflix | Ben Hope | Sebastian Croft | Ben was Charlie's first boyfriend who abused him. |
| 2022– | Heartstopper | Netflix | Nathan Ajayi | Fisayo Akinade | He is Charlie's gay art teacher. He is dating Mr. Farouk |
| 2022– | Heartstopper | Netflix | Coach Singh | Chetna Pandya | She is Nick's lesbian rugby coach. |
| 2022– | Heartstopper | Netflix | Youssef Farouk | Nima Taleghani | He is a teacher who is gay. He is dating Mr. Ajayi |
| 2022– | Heartstopper | Netflix | Sahar Zahid | Leila Khan | Sahar is bisexual and friends with Tara, Darcy, Imogen, and Elle. |
| 2022– | Heartstopper | Netflix | Naomi Russell | Bel Priestley | She is a transgender student enrolling at Elle's art school. |
| 2022– | Heartstopper | Netflix | Isaac Henderson | Tobie Donovan | Isaac is asexual and aromantic, he is only out to the friend group.I |
| 2022– | Heartstopper | Netflix | Felix Britten | Ash Self | They are a non-binary student enrolling at Elle's art school. |
| 2022– | Heartstopper | Netflix | Michael Holden | Darragh Hand | He is pansexual and he is sort of dating Tori. |
| 2022– | Heartstopper | Netflix | Tori Spring | Jenny Walser | She is asexual, aromantic, and heteroromantic. She is sort of dating Michael. |
| 2022– | Heartstopper | Netflix | Aled Last | Only appears in the graphic novels | He is demisexual and gay. He is dating Daniel Jun. |
| 2022– | Heartstopper | Netflix | Imogen Heaney | Rhea Norwoord | Imogen is not confirmed to be queer, but has shown interest in Sahar, and has expressed her confusion over her sexuality. There is sepculation that she is pansexual. |
| 2022– | Heartstopper | Netflix | James McEwan | Bradley Riches | He is the only other out gay boy at school. |
| 2022– | House of the Dragon | HBO | Laenor Velaryon | Theo Nate & John Macmillan | Laenor and Joffrey are lovers. |
| 2022– | House of the Dragon | HBO | Joffrey Lonmouth | Solly McLeod | Laenor and Joffrey are lovers. |
| 2022–2023 | How I Met Your Father | Hulu | Ellen | Tien Tran | Ellen is a lesbian who moves to New York City after her divorce from her wife, and she is a main character. |
| 2022 | The Ignorant Angels | Disney+ | Massimo | Luca Argentero | Massimo was the husband of Antonia while having an affair with Michele |
| 2022 | The Ignorant Angels | Disney+ | Michele | Eduardo Scarpetta | Massimo was the husband of Antonia while having an affair with Michele |
| 2022 | The Ignorant Angels | Disney+ | Vera | Lilith Primavera | A transgender friend of Michele |
| 2022 | The Ignorant Angels | Disney+ | Annamaria | Ambra Angiolini | A lesbian couple that is part of Michele's friend group |
| 2022 | The Ignorant Angels | Disney+ | Roberta | Anna Ferzetti | A lesbian couple that is part of Michele's friend group |
| 2022 | The Ignorant Angels | Disney+ | Riccardo | Edoardo Purgatori | A gay couple that is part of Michele's friend group |
| 2022 | The Ignorant Angels | Disney+ | Luciano | Filippo Scicchitano | A gay couple that is part of Michele's friend group |
| 2022– | Interview with the Vampire | AMC | Louis de Pointe du Lac | Jacob Anderson | Louis is gay. |
| 2022– | Interview with the Vampire | AMC | Lestat de Lioncourt | Sam Reid | Lestat is bisexual. |
| 2022– | Interview with the Vampire | AMC | Daniel Molloy | Eric Bogosian | Daniel's gay past is revealed through flashbacks. |
| 2022– | Interview with the Vampire | AMC | Armand | Assad Zaman | Armand is bisexual. |
| 2022– | Interview with the Vampire | AMC | Claudia | Bailey Bass & Delainey Hayles | Claudia's most significant relationship is with Madeleine, her female vampiric companion. |
| 2022– | Interview with the Vampire | AMC | Madeleine Éparvier | Roxane Duran | Madeleine is Claudia's companion. |
| 2022 | Irma Vep | HBO | Laurie | Adria Arjona | Laurie and Mira are exes. |
| 2022 | Irma Vep | HBO | Mira | Alicia Vikander | Laurie and Mira are exes. |
| 2022 | KinnPorsche | One 31 iQIYI | Kinn Theerapanyakul | Phakphum Romsaithong | KinnPorsche is a Thai boys' love drama series. It currently features 10 LGBT characters, though labels are rarely used to identify characters. Kinn is identified as gay by Porsche; Porsche had been involved with women prior to dating Kinn. Kinn and Porsche are the show's main couple. |
| 2022 | KinnPorsche | One 31 iQIYI | Porsche Kittisawasd | Nattawin Wattanagitiphat | KinnPorsche is a Thai boys' love drama series. It currently features 10 LGBT characters, though labels are rarely used to identify characters. Kinn is identified as gay by Porsche; Porsche had been involved with women prior to dating Kinn. Kinn and Porsche are the show's main couple. |
| 2022 | KinnPorsche | One 31 iQIYI | Vegas Theerapanyakul | Wichapas Sumettikul | Vegas has only been involved with men. He and Pete develop a mutual attraction. |
| 2022 | KinnPorsche | One 31 iQIYI | Pete | Jakapan Puttha | Vegas has only been involved with men. He and Pete develop a mutual attraction. |
| 2022 | KinnPorsche | One 31 iQIYI | Kim Theerapanyakul | Jeff Satur | Porchay initially has a crush on Kim; Kim later reciprocates his feelings. |
| 2022 | KinnPorsche | One 31 iQIYI | Porchay Kittisawasd | Tinnasit Isarapongporn | Porchay initially has a crush on Kim; Kim later reciprocates his feelings. |
| 2022 | KinnPorsche | One 31 iQIYI | Tay | Nititorn Akkarachotsopona | Tay and Time are in a relationship. |
| 2022 | KinnPorsche | One 31 iQIYI | Time | Chalach Tantijibul | Tay and Time are in a relationship. |
| 2022 | KinnPorsche | One 31 iQIYI | Yok | Patteerat Laemluang | Yok is a trans woman. |
| 2022 | KinnPorsche | One 31 iQIYI | Tawan | Naphat Vikairungroj | Tawan is Kinn's ex-boyfriend. |
| 2022 | Old-Fashioned Cupcake | Fuji Television, Viki, GagaOOLala | Sanae Nozue | Kouhei Takeda | Togawa confesses to Nozue that he has loved him ever since he inspired him to have a positive outlook towards life during his job interview. After reflecting, Nozue comes to accept his feelings for Togawa and the two become a couple. |
| 2022 | Old-Fashioned Cupcake | Fuji Television, Viki, GagaOOLala | Minoru Togawa | Tatsunari Kimura | Togawa confesses to Nozue that he has loved him ever since he inspired him to have a positive outlook towards life during his job interview. After reflecting, Nozue comes to accept his feelings for Togawa and the two become a couple. |
| 2022–2023 | Our Flag Means Death | HBO | Stede Bonnet | Rhys Darby | Stede is in a relationship with Blackbeard. |
| 2022–2023 | Our Flag Means Death | HBO | Blackbeard | Taika Waititi | Blackbeard is in a relationship with Stede. |
| 2022–2023 | Our Flag Means Death | HBO | Jim | Vico Ortiz | Jim is non-binary and uses they/them pronouns. |
| 2022–2023 | Our Flag Means Death | HBO | Oluwande Boodhari | Samson Kayo | Oluwande is Jim's friend, crewmate and later lover. |
| 2022–2023 | Our Flag Means Death | HBO | Black Pete | Matthew Maher | Black Pete is in a relationship with crewmate Lucius. |
| 2022–2023 | Our Flag Means Death | HBO | Lucius | Nathan Foad | Lucius is in a relationship with crewmate Black Pete. |
| 2022–2023 | Our Flag Means Death | HBO | John Rackham | Will Arnett | John Rackham is an old crewmate of Blackbeard's and tries to make Stede jealous of his and Blackbeards past flings. |
| 2022–2023 | Our Flag Means Death | HBO | Archie | Madeleine Sami | Archie is in a relationship with Jim in season 2. |
| 2022–2024 | Outer Range | Amazon Prime Video | Deputy Sheriff Joy Hawk | Tamara Podemski | Hawk is lesbian. |
| 2022– | Peacemaker | HBO Max | Christopher Smith / Peacemaker | John Cena | Peacemaker is bisexual. |
| 2022– | Peacemaker | HBO Max | Leota Adebayo | Danielle Brooks | Leota is a lesbian and the daughter of A.R.G.U.S. leader Amanda Waller and a member of Project Butterfly. |
| 2022– | Peacemaker | HBO Max | Keeya | Elizabeth Ludlow | Keeya is Leota Adebayo's wife. |
| 2022–2024 | Pretty Little Liars: Original Sin | HBO Max | Ash | Jordan Gonzalez | Ash is a trans student and Mouse's love interest. |
| 2022–2024 | Pretty Little Liars: Original Sin | HBO Max | Elodie Honrada | Lea Salonga | Elodie and Shirley are married women and Mouse's mothers. |
| 2022–2024 | Pretty Little Liars: Original Sin | HBO Max | Shirley Honrada | Kim Berrios Lin | Elodie and Shirley are married women and Mouse's mothers. |
| 2022 | Promised Land | ABC | Antonio Sandoval | Tonatiuh | Antonio is gay. |
| 2022–2023 | Rebelde | Netflix | Luka Colucci | Franco Masini | Luka is gay and was outed by Jana at his aunt's wedding. He is part of the band. |
| 2022–2023 | Rebelde | Netflix | Guillermo Álvarez (Dixon) | Jerónimo Cantillo | Dixon is bisexual. In episode four, he stated to Estebán Torres that he goes both ways. He is part of the band. |
| 2022–2023 | Rebelde | Netflix | Emília Alo | Giovanna Grigio | Emília is pansexual. Although she dated Sebastián, she ended up dating Andi, and she is part of the band. |
| 2022–2023 | Rebelde | Netflix | Andrea Agosti (Andi) | Lizeth Selene | Andi is lesbian. She is dating Emília, and she is part of the band. |
| 2022–2025 | The Sandman | Netflix | The Corinthian | Boyd Holbrook | The Corinthian is a Nightmare created by Dream that went rogue and started killing humans, against the orders of Dream. The Corinthian has a preference for eating the eyes of young men and/or sleeping with them. |
| 2022–2025 | The Sandman | Netflix | Johanna Constantine | Jenna Coleman | Johanna is a bisexual magician who deals in the Occult. In episode 3, Dream comes to her because she has his Sand, and she tells him that she left it at her ex-girlfriend's apartment, whom she left six months prior but still has feelings for. |
| 2022–2025 | The Sandman | Netflix | Judy | Daisy Head | Judy is a frequent customer at the 24-hour diner in episode 5. She comes in after a fight with her girlfriend Donna the previous night, trying to get in contact with her. |
| 2022–2025 | The Sandman | Netflix | Alex Burgess | Laurie Kynaston | Alex is the 2nd son of Roderick Burgess, the magician who imprisons Dream in 1916. In episode 1, he falls in love with Paul, and they remain together until 2020, when Paul helps Dream escape. |
| 2022–2025 | The Sandman | Netflix | Desire of the Endless | Mason Alexander Park | Desire is one of the seven Endless, the anthropomorphic embodiment of desire, sibling of Dream. They have no gender and go by all pronouns. |
| 2022–2025 | The Sandman | Netflix | Lucifer Morningstar | Gwendoline Christie | Lucifer is a fallen angel from Heaven, and ruler of Hell. They have no sex or gender, and are androgynous. |
| 2022 | Semantic Error | Watcha | Jang Jae-young | Park Seo-ham | Jae-young and Sang-woo are the main characters and in love with each other. |
| 2022 | Semantic Error | Watcha | Choo Sang-woo | Park Jae-chan | Jae-young and Sang-woo are the main characters and in love with each other. |
| 2022– | Severance | Apple TV+ | Irving Bailiff | John Turturro | Bailiff and Goodman fall in love with each other in an environment that forbids any kind of romantic attraction. |
| 2022– | Severance | Apple TV+ | Burt Goodman | Christopher Walken | Bailiff and Goodman fall in love with each other in an environment that forbids any kind of romantic attraction. |
| 2022 | She-Hulk: Attorney at Law | Disney+ | Craig Hollis / Mr. Immortal | David Pasquesi | Hollis is bisexual. He has many ex-wives and an ex-husband. |
| 2022–2024 | She Loves to Cook, and She Loves to Eat | NHK General TV | Nomoto Yuki | Manami Higa | One day, Nomoto finds herself making way more than she can eat by herself. And so she invites her neighbor Kasuga, who also lives alone. |
| 2022–2024 | She Loves to Cook, and She Loves to Eat | NHK General TV | Kasuga Totoko | Emi Nishino | One day, Nomoto finds herself making way more than she can eat by herself. And so she invites her neighbor Kasuga, who also lives alone. |
| 2022– | Single, Out | Here TV | Adam | Will Hutchins | Adam is a young man who embraces his true identity and comes out as gay to his family. |
| 2022– | Single, Out | Here TV | Josh | Adam Mountain | Josh is pansexual who gave Adam his first sexual experience, and later on encouraging him to come out so that they could openly be together. |
| 2022– | Single, Out | Here TV | Gabe | Jake Hyde | Gabe has a crush on Adam and their relationship eventually becomes official. |
| 2022– | Single, Out | Here TV | Marco | Ryan Stewart | Marco is Adam's gay best friend. |
| 2022– | Single, Out | Here TV | Dazi | Jaive Arlee McEwan | Dazi is Marco's non-binary love interest. |
| 2022– | Single, Out | Here TV | Sally | Kimmi Moscicki | Sally is Adam's lesbian co-worker. |
| 2022– | Single, Out | Here TV | Lex | Jesper Stenberg | Lex is bisexual who had a crush on Adam at first but ends up dating his female co-star Vera. |
| 2022– | SkyMed | Paramount+ | Captain Milosz Nowak | Thomas Elms | Nowak and Tristan became boyfriends. |
| 2022– | SkyMed | Paramount+ | Tristan Green | Kheon Clarke | Nowak and Tristan became boyfriends. |
| 2022– | SkyMed | Paramount+ | Lexi Martine | Mercedes Morris | Lexi and Stef became girlfriends. |
| 2022– | SkyMed | Paramount+ | Stef | Sydney Kuhne | Lexi and Stef became girlfriends. |
| 2022 | The White Lotus Sicily (Season 2) | HBO | Jack | Leo Woodall | Jack might be bisexual. He was having sex with Quentin, apparently for money. |
| 2022 | The White Lotus Sicily (Season 2) | HBO | Mia | Beatrice Grannò | Mia was bisexual. |
| 2022 | The White Lotus Sicily (Season 2) | HBO | Quentin | Tom Hollander | Quentin was a wealthy British gay tourist, who had been referred as "uncle" of Jack. |
| 2022 | The White Lotus Sicily (Season 2) | HBO | Valentina | Sabrina Impacciatore | Valentina was the closeted hotel manager, who had her sexual awakening w/ her encounter w/ Mia. |
| 2022 | The Witcher: Blood Origin | Netflix | Meldof | Francesca Mills | Meldof is a lesbian. Her war hammer is named after her late wife Gwen. |
| 2022 | The Witcher: Blood Origin | Netflix | Eredin | Jacob Collins-Levy | He is gay and has a relationship with Brian. |
| 2022 | The Witcher: Blood Origin | Netflix | Brian | Nathaniel Curtis | He is gay and has a relationship with Eredin. |
| 2022 | This Is Going to Hurt | BBC One | Adam Kay | Ben Whishaw | Adam is a gay doctor. The series is based on the memoir of Adam Kay. Harry is Adam's boyfriend. |
| 2022 | This Is Going to Hurt | BBC One | Harry Muir | Rory Fleck Byrne | Adam is a gay doctor. The series is based on the memoir of Adam Kay. Harry is Adam's boyfriend. |
| 2022–2023 | Welcome to Chippendales | Hulu; Star | Nick De Noia | Murray Bartlett | Nick is secretly gay. |
| 2022– | Why Are You Like This | ABC | Austin | Will King | Austin is gay and is one of the main characters in the group. |
| 2022– | Why Are You Like This | ABC | Mia | Olivia Junkeer | Mia is bisexual and is one of the main characters in the group. |
| 2022– | Why Are You Like This | ABC | Daniel | Lawrence Leung | Daniel is one of Penny's coworkers who is gay. He is a recurring character. |
| 2022–2023 | Willow | Disney+ | Jade | Erin Kellyman | Jade is a knight-in-training and Kit's love-interest who joins in the quest. |
| 2022–2023 | Willow | Disney+ | Princess Kit | Ruby Cruz | Jade is a knight-in-training and Kit's love-interest who joins in the quest. |
| 2022–2023 | The Winchesters | The CW | Carlos Cervantez | Jojo Fleites | Carlos is bisexual and non-binary. |
| 2022- | Wreck | BBC Three | Jamie Walsh | Oscar Kennedy | Jamie is gay. Jamie and Olly are in a relationship. |
| 2022- | Wreck | BBC Three | Olly Reyes | Anthony Rickman | Jamie is gay. Jamie and Olly are in a relationship. |
| 2022- | Wreck | BBC Three | Vivian Lim | Thaddea Graham | Vivian is a lesbian. |
| 2022- | Wreck | BBC Three | Rosie Preston | Miya Ocego | Rosie is trans. |

== 2023 ==
| Year | Show | Network | Character | Actor | Notes |
|---|---|---|---|---|---|
| 2023 | Absolute Beginners | Netflix | Niko | Bartłomiej Deklewa | Niko and Igor kissed in episode 4. |
| 2023 | Absolute Beginners | Netflix | Igor | Jan Sałasiński | Niko and Igor kissed in episode 4. |
| 2023- | The Ark | SyFy | Felix Strickland | Pavle Jerinić | Felix is gay. |
| 2023 | Beef | Netflix | Jordan Forster | Maria Bello | Forster is the wealthy owner of a home improvement chain store where works. She ends up dating Naomi, her brother's ex-wife. |
| 2023 | Beef | Netflix | Naomi | Ashley Park | Forster is the wealthy owner of a home improvement chain store where works. She ends up dating Naomi, her brother's ex-wife. |
| 2023 | Black Cake | Hulu | Bunny Pringle | Lashay Anderson | Bunny is a queer artist who comes out to her friend Covey. |
| 2023 | Black Cake | Hulu | Bunny Pringle | CCH Pounder | Bunny is a queer artist who comes out to her friend Covey. |
| 2023 | Bodies | Netflix | Alfred Hillinghead | Kyle Soller | Alfred is bisexual or closeted gay, has a family (wife and daughter), works as a cop. Ashe, a journalist helping him with his case, is his love interest. |
| 2023 | Bodies | Netflix | Henry Ashe | George Parker | Alfred is bisexual or closeted gay, has a family (wife and daughter), works as a cop. Ashe, a journalist helping him with his case, is his love interest. |
| 2023 | Culprits | Disney+ | Joe Petrus / David Marking / Muscle | Nathan Stewart-Jarrett | Joe and Jules are engaged. |
| 2023 | Culprits | Disney+ | Jules | Kevin Vidal | Joe and Jules are engaged. |
| 2023 | Dead Ringers | Amazon Prime Video | Beverly Mantle | Rachel Weisz | Beverly falls in love with Genevieve, an actress. |
| 2023 | Dead Ringers | Amazon Prime Video | Genevieve Cotard | Britne Oldford | Beverly falls in love with Genevieve, an actress. |
| 2023 | Dead Ringers | Amazon Prime Video | Rebecca Parker | Jennifer Ehle | Rebecca is lesbian. |
| 2023 | The Fall of the House of Usher | Netflix | Camille L'Espanaye | Kate Siegel | Camille has a threesome with her male and female assistants. |
| 2023 | The Fall of the House of Usher | Netflix | Madeline Usher | Mary McDonnell | Madeline is bisexual. |
| 2023 | The Fall of the House of Usher | Netflix | Napoleon "Leo" Usher | Rahul Kohli | Leo has a boyfriend who he cheats on with a woman. |
| 2023 | The Fall of the House of Usher | Netflix | Victorine LaFourcade | T'Nia Miller | Vic is married to a woman. |
| 2023 | The Fall of the House of Usher | Netflix | Prospero "Perry" Usher | Sauriyan Sapkota | Perry is shown to sleep with people of all genders. |
| 2023 | The Fall of the House of Usher | Netflix | C. Auguste Dupin | Carl Lumbly | His husband is mentioned. |
| 2023 | The Fall of the House of Usher | Netflix | Dr. Alessandra "Ali" Ruiz | Paola Núñez | Ali is Vic's wife. |
| 2023 | The Fall of the House of Usher | Netflix | Julius | Daniel Jun | Julius is Leo's boyfriend. |
| 2023 | Fellow Travelers | Showtime | Hawkins "Hawk" Fuller | Matt Bomer | Hawkins is a closeted gay man who works within the State Department during the height of the McCarthy Era. Hawk and Tim form a decades-long off-and-on-again relationship, despite Hawk's marriage with Lucy. |
| 2023 | Fellow Travelers | Showtime | Tim Laughlin | Jonathan Bailey | Tim is a congressional staffer on McCarthy's campaign, and starts a decades long affair with Hawkins. |
| 2023 | Full Circle | Max | Mel Harmony | Zazie Beetz | Mel and Carol are girlfriends. |
| 2023 | Full Circle | Max | Carol | May Hong | Mel and Carol are girlfriends. |
| 2023 | Full Circle | Max | Natalia | Adia | Natalia is Mel's ex-girlfriend. |
| 2023 | Gotham Knights | The CW | Harper Row | Fallon Smythe | Harper is a master thief/engineering tech expert and one of the Gotham Knights vigilante group. Stephanie is a student at Gotham Academy and an ally of the Gotham Knights. They gradually grow more close to each other and eventually kiss for the first time in Episode No. 11 'Daddy Issues'. |
| 2023 | Gotham Knights | The CW | Stephanie Brown | Anne Lore | Harper is a master thief/engineering tech expert and one of the Gotham Knights vigilante group. Stephanie is a student at Gotham Academy and an ally of the Gotham Knights. They gradually grow more close to each other and eventually kiss for the first time in Episode No. 11 'Daddy Issues'. |
| 2023 | Gotham Knights | The CW | Cullen Row | Tyler DiChiara | Cullen is Haprer's trans brother. |
| 2023 | Las pelotaris 1926 | Vix+ | Itzi | María de Nati | Itzi is a lesbian in a relationship with Ane |
| 2023- | The Last of Us | HBO | Riley Abel | Storm Reid | Riley is queer. |
| 2023- | The Last of Us | HBO | Bill | Nick Offerman | Bill is gay. |
| 2023- | The Last of Us | HBO | Dina | Isabela Merced | Dina is bisexual. |
| 2023- | The Last of Us | HBO | Ellie | Bella Ramsey | Ellie is lesbian. |
| 2023- | The Last of Us | HBO | Frank | Murray Bartlett | Frank is gay. |
| 2023- | The Last of Us | HBO | Kat | Noah Lamanna | Kat is Ellie's ex-girlfriend. |
| 2023– | Monarch: Legacy of Monsters | Apple TV+ | Cate Randa | Anna Sawai | Before the G-Day, Cate and Dani are girlfriends. |
| 2023– | Monarch: Legacy of Monsters | Apple TV+ | Dani | Courtney Dietz | Before the G-Day, Cate and Dani are girlfriends. |
| 2023 | Our Dating Sim | Rakuten TV, Viki, GagaOOLala | Lee Wan/Ian | Lee Jong-hyuk | Ian and Eddy are the main characters and in love with each other. |
| 2023 | Our Dating Sim | Rakuten TV, Viki, GagaOOLala | Shin Ki-tae/Eddy | Lee Seung-gyu | Ian and Eddy are the main characters and in love with each other. |
| 2023 | Queen Charlotte: A Bridgerton Story | Netflix | Brimsley | Sam Clemmett | Brimsley and Reynolds are secretly a couple. |
| 2023 | Queen Charlotte: A Bridgerton Story | Netflix | Reynolds | Freddie Dennis | Brimsley and Reynolds are secretly a couple. |
| 2023- | School Spirits | Paramount+ | Charley | Nick Pugliese | Charley is gay. The series explores his past bullying and lingering insecurities regarding his sexuality. |
| 2023- | School Spirits | Paramount+ | Emilio Figuero | Andres Soto Andrew Alvarez (young) | Emilio and Charley were in a relationship when Charley was alive. |
| 2023- | School Spirits | Paramount+ | Yuri | Miles Elliot | Yuri and Charley develop a relationship in the afterlife. |
| 2023 | Sin Huella (No Traces) | Amazon Prime Video | Desi | Carolina Yuste | Desi is lesbian. |
| 2023- | Silo | Apple TV+ | Martha Walker | Harriet Walter | Martha is an electrical engineer who runs a workshop in the lower levels of the Silo and Carla is Martha's ex-wife who works in the supply department. |
| 2023- | Silo | Apple TV+ | Carla | Clare Perkins | Martha is an electrical engineer who runs a workshop in the lower levels of the Silo and Carla is Martha's ex-wife who works in the supply department. |
| 2023 | Special Ops: Lioness | Paramount+ | Cruz/Zara Manuelos | Laysla De Oliveira | Cruz/Zara is bisexual. |
| 2023 | Special Ops: Lioness | Paramount+ | Aaliyah Amrohi | Stephanie Nur | Aaliyah fell in love with Cruz. |
| 2023 | Tore | Netflix | Tore | William Spetz | Tore is gay. |

== 2024 ==
| Year | Show | Network | Character | Actor | Notes |
|---|---|---|---|---|---|
| 2024 | The Acolyte | Disney+ | Jecki Lon | Dafne Keen | Lon's actress Keen confirmed Lon has a crush on Osha, a female former Padawan learner. |
| 2024 | Agatha All Along | Disney+ | Agatha Harkness | Kathryn Hahn | Harkness and Vidal are former lovers. |
| 2024 | Agatha All Along | Disney+ | Rio Vidal | Aubrey Plaza | Harkness and Vidal are former lovers. |
| 2024 | Agatha All Along | Disney+ | William Kaplan / Billy Maximoff | Joe Locke | Kaplan is in a romantic relationship with Eddie. |
| 2024 | Agatha All Along | Disney+ | Eddie | Miles Gutierrez-Riley | Kaplan is in a romantic relationship with Eddie. |
| 2024 | Baby Reindeer | Netflix | Donny Dunn | Richard Gadd | Dunn is bisexual. |
| 2024 | Baby Reindeer | Netflix | Teresa "Teri" | Nava Mau | Teri is transgender. |
| 2024- | Black Doves | Netflix | Sam Young | Ben Whishaw | Sam is gay. |
| 2024- | Brilliant Minds | NBC | Dana Dang | Aury Krebs | Dana Dang is in a relationship with Katie Rodriguz. |
| 2024- | Brilliant Minds | NBC | Dr. Josh Nichols | Teddy Sears | Dr. Josh Nichols is gay and starts a relationship with Dr. Oliver Wolf in Season 1. |
| 2024- | Brilliant Minds | NBC | Katie Rodriguez | Mishel Prada | Katie Rodriguez is in a relationship with Dana Dang. |
| 2024- | Brilliant Minds | NBC | Dr. Oliver Wolf | Zachary Quinto | Dr. Oliver Wolf is openly gay and starts a relationship with his colleague Dr. Josh Nichols in Season 1. |
| 2024- | The Day of the Jackal | Sky Atlantic (United Kingdom); Peacock (United States) | Ulle Dag Charles | Khalid Abdalla | Charles is gay. |
| 2024 | Dead Boy Detectives | Netflix | Edwin Payne | George Rexstrew | Payne is a closeted gay man who's in love with his best friend Charles and who has two admirers: the crow Monty and the Cat King. |
| 2024 | Dead Boy Detectives | Netflix | Monty | Joshua Colley | Monty is a gay crow familiar of the witch Esther who is at first tasked with the seduction of Edwin, then develops an actual romantic interest in him. |
| 2024 | Dead Boy Detectives | Netflix | Cat King | Lukas Gage | King shows a sexual (and perhaps romantic) interest in Edwin. |
| 2024 | Dead Boy Detectives | Netflix | Jenny Green | Briana Cuoco | Green is a lesbian goth landlady and Tongue & Tail butcher shop's owner. |
| 2024 | Dead Boy Detectives | Netflix | Maxine | Lindsey Gort | Maxine developed a twisted kind of love towards Jenny. |
| 2024 | Lost Boys and Fairies | BBC | Gabriel | Sion Daniel Young | Gabriel and Andy are a gay couple who have been together for eight years and are eager to adopt a child. |
| 2024 | Lost Boys and Fairies | BBC | Andy | Fra Fee | Gabriel and Andy are a gay couple who have been together for eight years and are eager to adopt a child. |
| 2024 | Mary & George | Sky Atlantic, Starz | George Villiers, 1st Duke of Buckingham | Nicholas Galitzine | George Villiers and King James are in a relationship currently, and the king used to be in a relationship with Robert Carr previously. |
| 2024 | Mary & George | Sky Atlantic, Starz | James VI and I | Tony Curran | George Villiers and King James are in a relationship currently, and the king used to be in a relationship with Robert Carr previously. |
| 2024 | Mary & George | Sky Atlantic, Starz | Robert Carr, 1st Earl of Somerset | Laurie Davidson | George Villiers and King James are in a relationship currently, and the king used to be in a relationship with Robert Carr previously. |
| 2024 | Mary & George | Sky Atlantic, Starz | Mary Villiers, Countess of Buckingham | Julianne Moore | Mary Villiers and Sandie enter into a relationship. |
| 2024 | Mary & George | Sky Atlantic, Starz | Sandie | Niamh Algar | Mary Villiers and Sandie enter into a relationship. |
| 2024 | Mr Loverman | BBC One | Barrington Jedidiah 'Barry' Walker | Lennie James | Walker is gay. |
| 2024 | My Lady Jane | Amazon Prime | King Edward | Jordan Peters | In this alternate history fantasy series, Edward is portrayed as gay and has a relationship with Fitz. |
| 2024 | My Lady Jane | Amazon Prime | Fitz | Joe Klocek | In this alternate history fantasy series, Edward is portrayed as gay and has a relationship with Fitz. |
| 2024 | Ossan's Love Returns | TV Asahi | Maki Ryota | Kento Hayashi | Haruta Soichi and Maki Ryota started living together as newlyweds. They try housekeeping services, but the person who appears at the door turns out to be Kurosawa Musashi. |
| 2024 | Ossan's Love Returns | TV Asahi | Haruta Soichi | Kei Tanaka | Haruta Soichi and Maki Ryota started living together as newlyweds. They try housekeeping services, but the person who appears at the door turns out to be Kurosawa Musashi. |
| 2024 | Ossan's Love Returns | TV Asahi | Kurosawa Musashi | Kōtarō Yoshida | Haruta Soichi and Maki Ryota started living together as newlyweds. They try housekeeping services, but the person who appears at the door turns out to be Kurosawa Musashi. |
| 2024-2026 | Palm Royale | Apple TV | Robert Diaz | Ricky Martin | Diaz is gay. |
| 2024– | Sram | HRT 1, HRTi, YouTube | Vito | Adrian Pezdirc | Vito is an openly gay man who shares an apartment with Nora and Lovro, the central characters of the second and third seasons, respectively. He is often seen bringing other men into the apartment for intimate relationships. |
| 2024– | Sram | HRT 1, HRTi, YouTube | Lovro | Borna Šimunek | Lovro is a closeted gay boy, who struggles to accept his homosexuality, despite being in love with Ivan, who is more comfortable with his pansexuality. |
| 2024– | Sram | HRT 1, HRTi, YouTube | Ivan Kovačić | Fran Rabuzin | Lovro is a closeted gay boy, who struggles to accept his homosexuality, despite being in love with Ivan, who is more comfortable with his pansexuality. |
| 2024 | Those About to Die | Peacock, Amazon Prime Video | Caltonia | Angeliqa Devi | Caltonia is the head of the Blue Faction, who tries to take advantage of Rufus' wife sexually. |
| 2024– | Tracker | CBS | Velma Bruin | Abby McEnany | Velma and Teddi are married. |
| 2024– | Tracker | CBS | Teddi Bruin | Robin Weigert | Velma and Teddi are married. |
| 2024 | Under the Bridge | Hulu | Cam Bentland | Lily Gladstone | Cam and Rebecca hook up in the bathroom of a bar. |
| 2024 | Under the Bridge | Hulu | Rebecca Godfrey | Riley Keough | Cam and Rebecca hook up in the bathroom of a bar. |

== 2025 ==
| Year | Show | Network | Character | Actor | Notes |
|---|---|---|---|---|---|
| 2025— | Adults | FX | Anton Evans | Owen Thiele | Anton is openly gay. |
| 2025— | Adults | FX | Paul Baker | Jack Innanen | Paul Baker identifies as sexually fluid. |
| 2025- | All's Fair | Hulu | Liberty Ronson | Naomi Watts | Liberty is bisexual |
| 2025- | All's Fair | Hulu | Carrington "Carr" Lane | Sarah Paulson | Carrington is either lesbian or bisexual. |
| 2025 | The Beast in Me | Netflix | Shelley Morris | Natalie Morales | Wiggs is a grieving author who struggles to write her next book. She and Morris are ex-wives. |
| 2025 | The Beast in Me | Netflix | Aggie Wiggs | Claire Danes | Wiggs is a grieving author who struggles to write her next book. She and Morris are ex-wives. |
| 2025 | Boots | Netflix | Cameron Cope | Miles Heizer | In the 1990s, Cameron Cope, a closeted gay American teenager, impulsively follows his best friend Ray McAffey into the United States Marine Corps. |
| 2025— | The Four Seasons | Netflix | Claude | Marco Calvani | Claude and Danny are gay and married to each other. |
| 2025— | The Four Seasons | Netflix | Danny | Colman Domingo | Claude and Danny are gay and married to each other. |
| 2025— | Heated Rivalry | Crave | Shane Hollander | Hudson Williams | Shane Hollander and Ilya Rozanov are two professional ice hockey players who compete on rival teams, the Montreal Metros and the Boston Raiders, respectively. Although their on-ice rivalry is amplified by media coverage and public perception, the two develop a private, initially casual sexual relationship that continues intermittently over several years as they pursue their hockey careers. |
| 2025— | Heated Rivalry | Crave | Ilya Rozanov | Connor Storrie | Shane Hollander and Ilya Rozanov are two professional ice hockey players who compete on rival teams, the Montreal Metros and the Boston Raiders, respectively. Although their on-ice rivalry is amplified by media coverage and public perception, the two develop a private, initially casual sexual relationship that continues intermittently over several years as they pursue their hockey careers. |
| 2025— | Heated Rivalry | Crave | Scott Hunter | François Arnaud | Shane Hollander and Ilya Rozanov are two professional ice hockey players who compete on rival teams, the Montreal Metros and the Boston Raiders, respectively. Although their on-ice rivalry is amplified by media coverage and public perception, the two develop a private, initially casual sexual relationship that continues intermittently over several years as they pursue their hockey careers. |
| 2025— | Heated Rivalry | Crave | Christopher "Kip" Grady | Robbie G.K. | Shane Hollander and Ilya Rozanov are two professional ice hockey players who compete on rival teams, the Montreal Metros and the Boston Raiders, respectively. Although their on-ice rivalry is amplified by media coverage and public perception, the two develop a private, initially casual sexual relationship that continues intermittently over several years as they pursue their hockey careers. |
| 2025— | I Love LA | HBO | Charlie Cohen | Jordan Firstman | Cohen is gay. |
| 2025— | I Love LA | HBO | Tallulah Stiel | Odessa A'zion | Stiel and Tessa are dating. |
| 2025— | I Love LA | HBO | Tessa | Moses Ingram | Stiel and Tessa are dating. |
| 2025 | Invisible Boys | Stan | Charlie Roth | Joseph Zada | Charlie is in a band. Sometimes he finds himself hooking-up with men, but one of the hook-ups turns out to be something more. He is a narrator since episode 1. |
| 2025 | Invisible Boys | Stan | Zeke Calogero | Aydan Calafiore | Zeke is struggling with his overprotective and homophobic mother. He is interested in Hammer. Zeke becomes a narrator in episode 2. |
| 2025 | Invisible Boys | Stan | Kade 'Hammer' Hammersmith | Zach Blampied | Hammer is young football player who's being pushed too hard by his mother. He is interested in Zeke. Hammer becomes a narrator in episode 3. |
| 2025 | Invisible Boys | Stan | Matt Jones | Joe Klocek | Matt is a mysterious man Charlie meets, and they develop a romantic relationship. Matt lives and works in a farm. He becomes a narrator in episode 9. |
| 2025 | Mid-Century Modern | Hulu | Bunny Schneiderman | Nathan Lane | Three gay best friends of a certain age, after an unexpected death, move in together in Palm Springs. Living with the wealthiest friend's mother, they navigate their golden years as a chosen family, supporting each other through life's challenges. |
| 2025 | Mid-Century Modern | Hulu | Jerry Frank | Matt Bomer | Three gay best friends of a certain age, after an unexpected death, move in together in Palm Springs. Living with the wealthiest friend's mother, they navigate their golden years as a chosen family, supporting each other through life's challenges. |
| 2025 | Mid-Century Modern | Hulu | Arthur Broussard | Nathan Lee Graham | Three gay best friends of a certain age, after an unexpected death, move in together in Palm Springs. Living with the wealthiest friend's mother, they navigate their golden years as a chosen family, supporting each other through life's challenges. |
| 2025 | Mid-Century Modern | Hulu | Carroll Mintz | Richard Kind | Carroll has a crush on Bunny. |
| 2025— | Murder Before Evensong | Acorn TV; Channel 5 | Alex de Floures | Alexander Delamain | Alex is the squire's son, who is having a fling with the local farm boy. |
| 2025 | Olympo | Netflix | Roque Pérez | Agustín Della Corte | Pérez is the captain of the rugby team. He is forced to be "a flagbearer for the sport because he's queer". His actor Corte felt uneasy in the role. |
| 2025 | Olympo | Netflix | Sebas Senghor | Juan Perales | Senghor is a closeted gay rugby player and Roque boyfriend. |
| 2025 | Olympo | Netflix | Diego Sorokov | Gleb Abrosimov | Sorokov is closetd gay and Roque's ex-boyfriend. |
| 2025 | Olympo | Netflix | Zoe Moral | Nira Oshaia | Moral is a bisexual runner. |
| 2025 | Olympo | Netflix | Jennifer Pina | Laura Moray | Pina is a bicycle athlete and Zoe's ex-girlfriend. |
| 2025 | Olympo | Netflix | Renata Aguilera | Andy Duato | Aguilera is an intersex heptathlon runner. She faces discrimination due to her identity and hormone treatments. Zoe's girlfriend. |
| 2025— | Overcompensating | Amazon Prime | Benny | Benito Skinner | Benny is a closeted freshman in college. |
| 2025— | Pluribus | Apple TV+ | Carol Sturka | Rhea Seehorn | Carol is a closeted lesbian writer married to Helen. |
| 2025— | Pluribus | Apple TV+ | Helen | Miriam Shor | Helen is married to Carol and is her manager. |
| 2025 | Prime Target | Apple TV+ | Edward Brooks | Leo Woodall | Brooks is a main character of the show who is gay. |
| 2025 | Running Point | Netflix | Alexander "Sandy" Gordon | Drew Tarver | Gordon serves as the chief financial officer for the family's basketball team. He is the boyfriend of Charlie. |
| 2025 | Running Point | Netflix | Charlie | Scott Evans | Gordon serves as the chief financial officer for the family's basketball team. He is the boyfriend of Charlie. |

== 2026 ==
| Year | Show | Network | Character | Actor | Notes |
|---|---|---|---|---|---|
| 2026— | Big Mistakes | Netflix | Nicky Dardano | Dan Levy | Nicky is an openly gay pastor. |
| 2026— | Big Mistakes | Netflix | Tareq | Jacob Gutierrez | Tareq is Nicky's boyfriend. |
| 2026 | Cape Fear | Apple TV | Natalie Bowden | Lily Collias | Natalie is lesbian. |
| 2026 | Half Man | HBO (United States), BBC iPlayer, BBC One (United Kingdom) | Niall Kennedy | Jamie Bell | Nicky is gay. |
| 2026 | Half Man | HBO (United States), BBC iPlayer, BBC One (United Kingdom) | Niall Kennedy | Mitchell Robertson (young) | Nicky is gay. |
| 2026 | The Shards (TV series) | FX on Hulu | Bret Easton Ellis | Igby Rigney | a closet gay senior at the Buckley prep school and aspiring writer |
| 2026 | The Shards (TV series) | FX on Hulu | Matt Kellner | Owen Painter | a reclusive student at Buckley with whom Bret has a secret relationship |
| 2026 | Tip Toe | Channel 4 | George Goss | Jackson Connor | Goss is gay. |
| 2026 | Tip Toe | Channel 4 | Leo Struthers | Alan Cumming | Struthers is gay. |
| 2026 | Sterling Point | Amazon Prime Video | Ramona | Amélie Hoeferle | Romona is a lesbian. |
| 2026 | Sterling Point | Amazon Prime Video | Oona | Bo Bragason | Oona is a lesbian. |
| 2026 | The Body | Netflix | Anya Butler | Kristina Bogic | |
| 2026 | The Body | Netflix | Elise | Sara Boustany | |

== See also ==
- List of lesbian characters in television
- List of gay characters in television
- List of bisexual characters in television
- List of transgender characters in television
- Lists of dramatic television series with LGBT characters
- List of fictional asexual characters
- List of fictional intersex characters
- List of fictional non-binary characters
- List of fictional pansexual characters
- List of animated series with LGBT characters
- List of comedy television series with LGBT characters
- List of horror television series with LGBT characters
- List of made-for-television films with LGBT characters
- List of news and information television programs featuring LGBT subjects
- List of reality television programs with LGBT cast members
- List of LGBT characters in radio and podcasts
- List of LGBT characters in soap operas
