= Holden Sheppard =

Australian novelist (born 1988)

- Born: 26 June 1988 (age 38); Geraldton, Western Australia
- Education: Edith Cowan University
- Occupation: Writer
- Spouse: Raphael Farmer (m. 2019)
- Writing career
- Language: English
- Years active: 2017–present
- Genres: Drama, LGBTQ
- Notable work: Invisible Boys
- Notable awards: Western Australian Premier's Book Awards (2019)
- Website: www.holdensheppard.com

Holden Sheppard (born June 26, 1988) is an Australian novelist. His debut young adult novel, Invisible Boys, won multiple accolades including the 2018 T.A.G. Hungerford Award and the 2019 Western Australian Premier's Book Award and was adapted as a 2025 television series of the same name. His writing often focuses on themes of masculinity, sexuality and mental health.

== Early life ==
Sheppard was born in the country town of Geraldton in Western Australia. At the age of 18, he moved to Perth and studied writing at Edith Cowan University.

== Career ==
Sheppard's debut young adult novel, Invisible Boys, follows three gay teenage boys in rural Western Australia after one of them is outed. It was published by Fremantle Press in 2019 after Sheppard won the T.A.G. Hungerford Award in 2018 and received a cash prize and publishing contract. In 2019, he won the Western Australian Premier's Book Award for an Emerging Writer and received $15,000 in prize money. The following year, the book was shortlisted for the Victorian Premier's Literary Awards and was named a Notable Book by the Children's Book Council of Australia. It was later developed as a 10-part television series for Stan, as part of a Screenwest development initiative, with production occurring from March 2024 and the series released on 13 February 2025.

His second book, YA thriller The Brink, was published by Text Publishing in 2022 and won the 2023 Indie Book Awards Young adult prize. The book follows a group of school leavers on a remote island off the coast of Western Australia, where they discover a dead body.

Sheppard's writing has been published in several literary magazines including Griffith Review, Westerly, page seventeen and Indigo Journal. His work has also appeared in anthologies Bright Lights, No City (2018), Hometown Haunts: #LoveOzYA Horror Tales (2021) and Growing Up in Country Australia (2022).

Sheppard's novel Invisible Boys was adapted as a standalone series in 2025 on Stan, featuring actors Joseph Zada, Joe Klocek and Aydan Calafiore in the lead roles. The series received critical reception among viewers for its screenplay and storyline which was written by an all-gay writing team including Verso, Sheppard, Allan Clarke, Enoch Mailangi and Declan Greene. Giselle Au-Nhien Nguyen from Guardian Australia critiques ways Invisible Boys "begins to play into the cliche that queerness and relentless trauma go hand in hand, and veers close to trauma porn with a major plot event."

In 2025, Sheppard released his 3rd novel King of Dirt which opened up to positive reviews from critics. Sheppard stated. “King of Dirt tackles themes of masculinity, sexuality and mental illness and trauma in men and what that looks like. It also dives deep into issues of family dysfunction, family estrangement and fatherhood, as well as love and loss and finding hope after losing everything. King of Dirt explores what a traumatised, addicted, mentally-unwell Aussie bloke in his 30s looks like, through the main character of Giacomo “Jack” Brolo".

Sheppard's 4th novel,Yeah The Boys, the sequel to Invisible Boys, was released in April 2026. In June 2026, it was announced that Deadset Pictures had acquired the screen rights to Yeah The Boys.As of October 2026, the adapatation of Yeah The Boys remains in development.

== Personal life ==
Sheppard is openly gay and is married to husband Raphael Farmer who is also a novelist. He is also a part-time labourer. Holden lives in Perth's far north with his husband.

== Bibliography ==
=== Novels ===
Year	Title	Notes
2019	Invisible Boys	Debut novel. Translated into French as Les Garçons Invisibles.
2022	The Brink	
2025	King of Dirt	
2026	Yeah the Boys	Sequel to Invisible Boys

=== Short Stories and Contributions ===
Year	Title	Notes
2009	A Man	Novella
2017	The Scroll of Isidor	Novella
2017	The Black Flower	Short story
2018	Poster Boy	Short story, featured in Griffith Review 62 - All Being Equal
2019	Fight, Deny, Delete	Short story, featured in Bright Lights No City
2020	Beanstalk	Flash fiction, featured in Short Story Dispenser
2020	Irreversible	Short story, featured in Westerly: Literature and Ideas
2021	Rappaccini's Son	Short story, featured in Hometown Haunts: #LoveOzYA Horror Tales
2022	Territory	Short memoir, featured in Growing Up in Country Australia
2024	Your Disco Needs You	Short story, featured in Spinning Around: The Kylie Playlist

== Television ==
Year	Show	Role	Channel	Language	Notes
2022	You Can't Ask That	Guest	ABC	English	
2025	Invisible Boys	Writer	Stan	English	Source Novel

== Accolades ==
Year	Award	Result	Ref.
2017	Ray Koppe Residency Award	Won	
2018	T.A.G. Hungerford Award	Won	
2019	Kathleen Mitchell Award	Won	
2019	Western Australian Premier's Book Awards	Won	
2020	Readings Young Adult Book Prize	Nominated	
2020	Children's Book Council of Australia Notable Book	Nominated	
2020	Indie Book Award	Nominated	
2020	Victorian Premier's Literary Award	Nominated	
2023	Indie Book Award – Young adult	Won	
2023	Ethel Turner Prize for Young People's Literature (New South Wales Premier's Literary Awards)	Shortlisted	
2024	Ena Noël Award	Shortlisted	
2025	Minderoo Award	Won	
2026	Western Australian Premier's Book Awards – Fiction Book of the Year	Shortlisted	
