= YYY =

YYY may refer to:

- Yeah Yeah Yeahs, a band from New York
- Mont-Joli Airport, serving Mont-Joli, Quebec, Canada (IATA code YYY)
- The Yada Yada, an expression popularized on the TV series Seinfeld
- The Monster of Peladon, a 1974 Doctor Who serial (production code YYY)
- YYY, a 2020 Thai television series with LGBT characters
