= Nicholas Verso =

Australian filmmaker

- Born: Australia
- Occupations: Screenwriter, director, producer
- Notable work: Boys In The Trees, Crazy Fun Park, Invisible Boys

Nicholas Verso is an Australian screenwriter, director and producer. He made his feature film debut with the 2016 film, Boys In The Trees, which premiered at the 73rd Venice International Film Festival.

He is best known for his TV directing work, particularly creating the series Crazy Fun Park, and the adaptation of the 2019 novel Invisible Boys for Stan, which was nominated for a Peabody Award.

== Career ==
Verso's short film work includes Flight (a 2011 Tropfest short-film festival finalist) and The Last Time I Saw Richard, starring Toby Wallace and Cody Fern, which won Best Short Film at the AACTA Awards in 2014 and was honoured by the Académie des Arts et Techniques du Cinéma as part of their Golden Nights Panorama.

He made his feature film debut in 2016 with the Halloween fantasy drama, Boys In The Trees, starring Toby Wallace. The film made its North American debut at the 2016 Toronto International Film Festival and won Best Narrative Feature at the Austin Film Festival. The film holds a score of 82% on Rotten Tomatoes.

In 2023, he created the series, Crazy Fun Park, for ABC-Me, a horror-comedy inspired by the death of several friends when he was younger. It caused a minor controversy when it won the 2023 TV Week Logie Award for the Most Outstanding Children's Program, beating Bluey.

In 2025, he created his next series, Invisible Boys, for Stan. Based on the Holden Sheppard novel of the same name, the series follows the challenges of four gay teens in the coastal city of Geraldton in Western Australia following the 2017 same-sex marriage plebiscite. The series has received a positive reception, debuting at #1 on the platform and multiple AACTA nominations. In September 2025, Verso announced on Twitter that Invisible Boys, initially announced as a limited series, had not been renewed for a second season.

In June 2026, it was announced by Holden Sheppard that the screen rights to his follow-up novel to Invisible Boys, Yeah The Boys, had been secured by Deadset Pictures. Nicholas Verso does not appear to be involved in the adaption of Yeah The Boys.

Verso's other television directing work includes Nowhere Boys, The Unlisted, Itch, In Our Blood and Swift Street.

== Awards ==
Year	Title	Award	Result	Ref.
2026	A Little Help	Reg Grundy Award - AACTA Awards	Nominated	
2026	Invisible Boys	Mini Series Production of the Year - Screen Producers Awards	Nominated	
2026	Invisible Boys	Best Miniseries - AACTA Awards	Nominated	
2025	Invisible Boys	Best Streaming Series - IFFA Awards	Won	
2024	Crazy Fun Park	Jury Prize - Prix Jeunesse	Won	
2024	Crazy Fun Park	Childrens Series Production of the Year - Screen Producers Australia (SPA) Awards	Won	
2023	Crazy Fun Park	Best Direction of a Children's Series - Australian Directors Guild Awards	Won	
2023	Crazy Fun Park	Best Children's Television (Episode One) - Australian Writers Guild Awards	Nominated	
2023	Crazy Fun Park	Best Childrens Show - Logie Awards	Won	
2019	Grace Beside Me	Best Direction of a Children's Series - Australian Directors Guild Awards	Won	
2016	Boys In The Trees	Best Narrative Feature - Austin Film Festival	Won	
2016	Boys In The Trees	Venice Horizons Award - Venice Film Festival	Nominated	
2014	The Last Time I Saw Richard	Best Short Film - AACTA Awards	Won	
2012	Boys In The Trees	Monte Miller Award - AWGIE Awards	Nominated	
