= Gulliver McGrath =

Australian actor

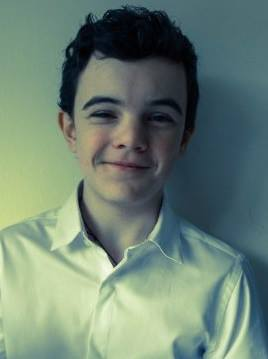
- McGrath in 2011
- Born: Gulliver William McGrath; 15 August 1998 (age 28); Melbourne, Australia
- Education: Western Australian Academy of Performing Arts (WAAPA)
- Occupation: Actor
- Years active: 2008–present

Gulliver William McGrath (born 15 August 1998) is an Australian actor.

== Early life ==
McGrath was born and raised in Melbourne, Australia, to Heidi Chapman, a neuroscientist, and Craig McGrath, an anaesthetist. The family then relocated to Birmingham in the UK, and continued to raise him there. McGrath is the older brother of actors, Zen and Winta McGrath.

McGrath studied acting at Western Australian Academy of Performing Arts (WAAPA) in Perth.

== Career ==
McGrath played a guest role as Charlie in an episode of Australian police series Rush in 2008. The following year, he starred as the title character in a 2009 Melbourne Theatre Company production of Poor Boy, alongside Guy Pearce and Abi Tucker.

McGrath landed the role of David Collins in 2012 Tim Burton comedy horror film Dark Shadows, alongside Johnny Depp, His portrayal earned him a 2013 Young Artist Award nomination for Best Supporting Young Actor in a Feature Film. That same year, he played the role of Tad Lincoln, opposite Daniel Day-Lewis, in Steven Spielberg's Lincoln. Then in 2014, he appeared in the comedy thriller The Voices, as the younger version of Ryan Reynolds's character, Jerry Hickfang. McGrath then co-starred with Toby Wallace (as Jonah and Corey respectively), in 2016 Australian fantasy drama film Boys in the Trees.

In 2022, McGrath had a co-starring role as Hugo, one of Sarah's children, in Australian drama miniseries Significant Others. He appeared alongside Rachael Blake, Alison Bell and Jacqueline McKenzie. The following year, he had a recurring role as Constable Dale Quinn in coming-of-age 'whodunit' drama Black Snow, opposite Travis Fimmel.

== Filmography ==
=== Film ===
| Year | Title | Role | Notes |
|---|---|---|---|
| 2009 | The Wake | Charles | Billed as Gully McGrath |
| 2009 | The Loved Ones | 8-year-old Keir Willis | Billed as Gully McGrath |
| 2010 | The Long Night | Luke | Short film |
| 2011 | Hugo | Young Tabard | |
| 2012 | Dark Shadows | David Collins | Billed as Gully McGrath |
| 2012 | Lincoln | Tad Lincoln | |
| 2014 | The Voices | Teenage Jerry | |
| 2016 | Boys in the Trees | Jonah | |

=== Television ===
| Year | Title | Role | Notes |
|---|---|---|---|
| 2008 | Rush | Charlie | Season 1, episode 12 |
| 2022 | Significant Others | Ciaran | Miniseries, 6 episodes |
| 2023 | Black Snow | Dale Quinn | 6 episodes |

== Stage ==
| Year | Title | Role | Notes | Ref. |
|---|---|---|---|---|
| 2008 | Poor Boy | Boy | Southbank Theatre, Melbourne with MTC | |
