= Lists of dramatic television series with LGBT characters =

Lists of dramatic television series with LGBT characters are organized by period and contain lists about television series with lesbian, gay, bisexual, and/or transgender characters. They include:

- List of dramatic television series with LGBT characters: 1960s–2000s
- List of dramatic television series with LGBT characters: 2010–2015
- List of dramatic television series with LGBT characters: 2016–2019
- List of dramatic television series with LGBT characters: 2020s
