= In Our Blood =

2023 Australian TV series

- Genre: Musical drama
- Created by: Adriano Cappelletta
- Written by: Adriano Cappelletta; Jane Allen; Jonathan Gavin
- Directed by: John Sheedy; Nicholas Verso
- Starring: Tim Draxl; Matt Day; Jada Alberts
- Composer: Elliott Wheeler
- Country of origin: Australia
- Original language: English
- No. of seasons: 1
- No. of episodes: 4

Production
- Executive producers: Nathan Mayfield; Tracey Robertson; Tracey Vieira; Adriano Cappaelletta
- Producers: Nathan Mayfield; Tracey Robertson
- Cinematography: Jason Hargreaves
- Running time: 46–51 minutes
- Production company: Hoodlum Entertainment

Original release
- Network: ABC TV
- Release: March 19, 2023 – 9 April 2023

In Our Blood is an Australian historical drama television miniseries with musical elements which aired on ABC TV from 19 March 2023 until 9 April 2023.

== Synopsis ==
A series looking at Australia's response to the AIDS crisis.

== Cast ==
- Tim Draxl as David Westford
- Matt Day as Jeremy Wilding
- Jada Alberts as Deb Ferguson
- Nicholas Brown as Dr. Paul Kemble
- Oscar Leal as Gabe
- Anna McGahan as Michelle
- Scott Johnson as Constable Barnaby

== Episodes ==
No.	Title	Directed by	Written by	Original release date
1	"Grid"	John Sheedy	Adriano Cappelletta	19 March 2023
2	"No Time For Politicking"	John Sheedy	Jane Allen	26 March 2023
3	"Intriguing Habits"	Nicholas Verso	Jonathan Gavin	2 April 2023
4	"There’s Always a Dance Floor"	Nicholas Verso	Adriano Cappelletta & Jane Allen	9 April 2023

== Broadcast ==
In Our Blood aired on ABC TV from 19 March 2023 until 9 April 2023.

== Reception ==
Michael Sun of The Guardian gave it 3 stars out of 5, stating "one wishes In Our Blood leaned harder into its bizarro world and lived up to the sheer campiness of its premise. For a series about misbehaving queers, it’s awfully restrained" The Queer Review's Chad Armstrong gave it 3 out of stars, saying "While the series is hit and miss, there are some brilliant moments and things definitely improve in the second half under director Nicholas Verso, who gets the balance between genuine human emotion and stylized visuals right". David Knox of TV Tonight rated the series 4.5 out of 5 stars, saying "Ingeniously, the narrative weaves in a Greek Chorus of chameleon performers (Adriano Cappalletta, Nic Prior, Tomas Parrish, Alice Birbarra), who break the fourth wall imparting necessary history points to the viewer and, joyously, bursting into song. The weaving of these ’80s hits juxtaposed against the politics is one of the drama’s many pleasures".

== Awards ==
Year	Award	Category	Nominee(s)	Result	Ref.
2023	Logie Awards of 2023	Most Outstanding Drama Series, Miniseries or Telemovie	In Our Blood	Nominated	
