= Joseph Zada =

Australian actor (born 2005)

- Joseph Zada in October 2026
- Born: Joseph Cumpston; 21 July 2005 (age 21); Sydney, New South Wales, Australia
- Occupation: Actor
- Years active: 2019–present
- Father: Jeremy Cumpston
- Relatives: Hal Cumpston (half-brother); Nici Cumpston (aunt)

Joseph Cumpston (born 21 July 2005), known professionally as Joseph Zada, is an Australian actor. He has appeared in television series such as Total Control (2024) and Stan Australia series Invisible Boys (2025), as well as Australian movies Bilched (2019) and The Speedway Murders (2023). He features in the series We Were Liars (2025–present), East of Eden (2026), and stars in the film adaptation of Sunrise on the Reaping as Haymitch Abernathy.

== Early and personal life ==
Zada was born on 21 July 2005 in Sydney, Australia and raised there. His father, Jeremy Cumpston, is a director, actor, and doctor. His mother, Jessica Brentnall is a film producer. He has four siblings, including Hal Cumpston. Zada dropped out of high school in 2023 to pursue acting, telling GQ Australia: "My attendance was too low. They said, 'If you do that audition, you’re not coming back.' So I dropped out to do an audition." He has Afghan-Aboriginal heritage through his paternal great-grandmother. His Indigenous roots link him to the Barkandji people. In 2025, he adopted the name Zada for his stage name, which came from his grandmother.

== Career ==
His first notable acting role was as Toby in the 2019 comedy drama Bilched. The film was directed by his father and starred his brother Hal. In 2023, he played the lead role of Dan in the crime documentary film The Speedway Murders. He later appeared as Daniel in several episodes of Australian political drama series Total Control, at the start of the third season. In 2025, Zada starred in the Stan series Invisible Boys as Charlie Roth. The series follows the challenges of teens in Geraldton after the Australian Marriage Law Postal Survey, a survey designed to gauge the level of support for same-sex marriage in the country. The Guardian stated that Zada, along with co-stars Joe Klocek, Aydan Calafiore, and Zach Blampied, played the roles with "depth and complexity".

In May 2024, it was announced that Zada would star in the television adaptation of the 2014 young adult novel We Were Liars by E. Lockhart, in the role of Johnny Sinclair, a cousin of main character Cadence. The series released on Amazon Prime Video on 18 June 2025. In October 2024, it was announced that Zada would appear as Cal Trask in the Netflix series East of Eden, an adaptation of the 1952 John Steinbeck novel of the same name. The series was released in October 2026.

In April 2025, it was announced that Zada would star as Haymitch Abernathy in the Lionsgate film The Hunger Games: Sunrise on the Reaping, based on the best-selling prequel novel to The Hunger Games of the same name. Zada was announced in the role with Whitney Peak, who will play Lenore Dove Baird, Haymitch's girlfriend. Lionsgate co-president Erin Westerman said in a statement: "After auditioning hundreds of gifted performers from around the world, these two stood out—not just for their talent, but for the emotional truth they brought to these iconic roles." Westerman continued: "The Hunger Games franchise has long been a launching pad for remarkable young actors, and Jo and Whitney carry that legacy forward with incredible heart, depth, and fire." In December 2025, Zada was named Breakthrough Actor of the Year by GQ Australia magazine.

== Filmography ==
Key
†	Denotes films that have not yet been released

=== Film ===
Year	Title	Role	Notes	Ref.
2019	Bilched	Toby		
2023	The Speedway Murders	Dan		
2023	David Jones Locker	Noel	Short film	
2026	The Hunger Games: Sunrise on the Reaping	Haymitch Abernathy		

=== Television ===
Year	Title	Role	Notes	Ref.
2024	Total Control	Daniel	Guest role; 3 episodes	
2025	Invisible Boys	Charlie Roth	Main role	
2025–present	We Were Liars	Johnny Sinclair Dennis	Main role	
2026	East of Eden	Caleb "Cal" Trask	Recurring role; 2 episodes	

== Accolades ==
Award	Year	Category	Work	Result	Ref.
GQ Australia Men of the Year Awards	2025	Breakthrough Actor of the Year	-	Won	
AACTA Awards	2026	Audience Choice Award for Favourite Australian Actor	-	Nominated	
AACTA Awards	2026	Audience Choice Award for Rabanne Breakthrough Artist	-	Nominated	
