= Boys in the Trees (film) =

2016 film

- Film poster
- Directed by: Nicholas Verso
- Written by: Nicholas Verso
- Produced by: John Molloy
- Starring: Toby Wallace; Gulliver McGrath
- Cinematography: Marden Dean
- Edited by: Nicholas Verso
- Music by: Darrin Verhagen; Shinjuku Thief
- Release dates: 9 September 2016 (Venice); 20 October 2016 (Australia)
- Running time: 112 minutes
- Country: Australia
- Language: English

Boys in the Trees is a 2016 Australian fantasy drama film directed by Nicholas Verso. It was screened in the Discovery section at the 2016 Toronto International Film Festival. The plot follows two boys who reconnect over their memories and fears as they walk through the woods on Halloween night, 1997.

== Cast ==
- Toby Wallace as Corey
- Gulliver McGrath as Jonah
- Mitzi Ruhlmann as Romany
- Justin Holborow as Jango

== Critical reception ==
On the review aggregator website Rotten Tomatoes, 82% of 22 critics' reviews are positive.

The A.V. Club included it in its "The best films of 2017 that we didn't review" feature, noting that while its themes were not original, the film "grapples with the universal teenage themes of fitting in and growing apart more imaginatively—and sensitively—than most." The Guardian's reviewer gave it 2/5, finding some moments were "memorably surreal," but writing that it suffered from its low budget and lack of script editing.

== See also ==
- List of films set around Halloween
