= Crazy Fun Park =

Australian television series

- Official release poster
- Genre: Comedy horror
- Created by: Nicholas Verso
- Written by: Nicholas Verso; Fury; Craig Irvin; Enoch Mailangi; Magda Wozniak
- Directed by: Nicholas Verso; Sarah Hickey
- Starring: Henry Strand; Stacy Clausen
- Composer: Cornel Wilczek
- Country of origin: Australia
- Original language: English
- No. of seasons: 1
- No. of episodes: 10

Production
- Producer: Joanna Werner
- Cinematography: Matthew Temple
- Running time: 24 minutes

Original release
- Network: ABC ME
- Release: January 1, 2023

Crazy Fun Park is an Australian comedy horror television series created, directed, and written by Nicholas Verso for ABC ME. It premiered on 1 January 2023. The series won the 2023 TV Week Logie Award for Most Outstanding Children's Program, and was nominated for Best Children's Television Series at the 13th AACTA Awards.

== Synopsis ==
Chester is a teenager who tries his best at school but sometimes gets his grades dragged down by mainly one of his friends. His best friend is Mapplethorpe. The two write comics together until they get into a fight, and Mapplethorpe dies at a run-down theme park while trying to make it up to Chester. Crazy Fun Park is an abandoned roller coaster park, once meant to bring joy and happiness but has only brought death since its founding, and is rumoured to have ghosts who roam the premises at night but are unable to leave. Chester is forlorn; until he realises his old friend - as well as many new who met tragic fates some years ago - are a lot less dead than they seem...

The story follows Chester, Mapplethorpe, Violetta, Remus, and the Fun Kids who inhibited the park, as they help one another resolve unfinished business uncovering the secrets of Crazy Fun Park and the story of its founder.

== Cast and characters ==
- Henry Strand as Chester Dante
- Stacy Clausen as Mapplethorpe Landis
- Hannah Ogawa as Violetta Nakata
- Pedrea Jackson as Nimrod
- Lee Halley as Gonzo
- Jason Thompson as Zed
- Justin Holborow as Remus
- Georgia La Belle as Destinee McPhail
- Katherine Tonkin as Phoebe
- Bernard Curry as Zach Dante
- Charli Wookey as Siobhan
- Ziggy Zilberman-Sharp as Tigger
- Judith Lucy as Ms Wiest
- Safe Shahab as Willo
- Hugh Nakamura as Ricky
- Alicia Banit as Asha
- Nicholas Hope as Neville Moore

== Episodes ==
No.	Title	Directed by	Written by	Original release date
1	"I Don't Want To Grow Up"	Nicholas Verso	Nicholas Verso	1 January 2023
2	"One Of Us"	Nicholas Verso	Nicholas Verso	1 January 2023
3	"Let it Go"	Nicholas Verso	Nicholas Verso	1 January 2023
4	"Remember Me"	Sarah Hickey	Magda Wozniak	1 January 2023
5	"Together Forever"	Nicholas Verso	Craig Irvin	1 January 2023
6	"This is Halloween"	Nicholas Verso	Nicholas Verso	1 January 2023
7	"Friends with Feelings"	Nicholas Verso	Enoch Mailangi & Nicholas Verso	1 January 2023
8	"My Name is"	Nicholas Verso	Nicholas Verso	1 January 2023
9	"Stay"	Nicholas Verso	Nicholas Verso	1 January 2023
10	"Mirrors"	Nicholas Verso	Nicholas Verso	1 January 2023
