= The Speedway Murders =

- Directed by: Adam Kamien; Luke Rynderman
- Screenplay by: Adam Kamien; Luke Rynderman
- Produced by: Bonnie McBride; Louise Nathanson; Lisa Scot; Anna Vincent
- Starring: Joseph Cumpston; Essie Randles; Davida McKenzie; Nya Cofie
- Cinematography: Maxx Corkindale
- Edited by: Sean Lahiff
- Music by: Josie Mann; Jackson Milas; Antony Partos; Josh Pearson
- Production companies: SLA Films; Ringleader Films; Hianlo; Highview Productions
- Distributed by: Umbrella Entertainment (Australia); Vertical Entertainment (United States)
- Release date: October 20, 2023
- Running time: 101 minutes
- Countries: Australia; United States
- Language: English

The Speedway Murders, also known as simply Speedway, is a 2023 Australian-American crime documentary film directed and written by Adam Kamien and Luke Rynderman. The film is based on a true story and premiered on October 20, 2023 at the Adelaide Film Festival.

== Plot ==
The film follows four young friends who disappeared after their shift at the fast-food restaurant Burger Chef in Speedway, Indiana on November 17, 1978. Two days later, their bodies were found in Johnson County, over 20 miles away. The case was never solved, partly due to police mishandling of evidence at the time. This documentary reexamines the case and explores various theories about what might have happened.

In addition to the film featuring actors, it also includes interspersed interviews and archival footage.

== Cast ==
- Joseph Cumpston as Dan
- Essie Randles as Jayne
- Davida McKenzie as Ruth
- Nya Cofie as Mark
- Murray Curtis as Jeff Reed
- Cordell Horsell as Donald Forrester
- Audrey Vincent as Mary Ann
- Brodie Bowers as Robber
- Todd McComas as himself

== Production ==
The film was directed and written by Adam Kamien and Luke Ryndermann, and produced by Bonnie McBride, Anna Vincent, Louise Nathanson, Lisa Scott. The film is based on the unsolved 1978 Burger Chef murders case, in which four young employees of the fast food company disappeared in Indiana and were all found dead two days later in another town. The film starred Joseph Cumpston, Essie Randles, Davida McKenzie and Nya Cofie.

== Release ==
The Speedway Murders premiered on October 20, 2023, at the Adelaide Film Festival in Adelaide, Australia. The film was then released in select Australian and American cinemas on June 21, 2024. The film was simultaneously released on several streaming services, including Prime Video and Apple TV+.
