= Invisible Boys =

2025 Australian television series

- Genre: Drama
- Created by: Nicholas Verso
- Based on: Invisible Boys by Holden Sheppard
- Written by: Nicholas Verso; Allan Clarke; Holden Sheppard; Declan Greene; Enoch Mailangi
- Directed by: Nicholas Verso
- Starring: Joseph Zada; Aydan Calafiore; Joe Klocek; Zach Blampied
- Country of origin: Australia
- Original language: English
- No. of series: 1
- No. of episodes: 10

Production
- Executive producers: Donna Chang; Cailah Scobie
- Producers: Nicholas Verso; Tania Chambers
- Production companies: Asphodel Films; Feisty Dame Productions

Original release
- Network: Stan
- Release: 13 February 2025

Invisible Boys is an Australian drama series for Stan that premiered on 13 February 2025. It is created and directed by Nicholas Verso, adapted from the novel of the same name by Holden Sheppard. The series follows the challenges of teens in the coastal city of Geraldton in Western Australia following the 2017 same-sex marriage plebiscite, it focuses on finding friendships, solace and understanding on what makes them "invisible".

== Premise ==
During the 2017 same-sex marriage plebiscite, a group of teens in the remote coastal city of Geraldton, Western Australia must explore the challenges of social media after one of them is outed on social media after an encounter with a married man. Afterwards, the group bands together to find solace, strengthen their friendships and begin understanding what made them previously invisible, and why they must continue to support each other afterwards.

The series follows four teenage boys—Charlie, Zeke, Hammer, and Matt—each struggling with their identity, family pressures, and the harsh expectations of a small-town community. The story begins when Charlie, a rebellious punk outsider, is outed on social media after an encounter with a married man. This moment forces him into an unwelcome spotlight and sets off a chain reaction for the others, who are each forced to confront their own invisibility. Zeke, a high-achieving boy from a strict Sicilian Catholic family, battles shame and fear of rejection. Hammer, a popular Indigenous footy player and local hero, feels suffocated by masculine and cultural expectations while hiding his truth. Matt, a quiet farm boy burdened by family responsibilities and isolation, begins a downward spiral as the weight of secrecy and hopelessness grows unbearable.

== Cast ==
- Joseph Zada as Charlie Roth
- Aydan Calafiore as Zeke Calogero
- Joe Klocek as Matt Jones
- Zach Blampied as Kade 'Hammer' Hammersmith
- Pia Miranda as Anna Calogero
- David Lyons as Father Mulroney
- Joanna Tu as Nat
- Myles Pollard as Jack Hammersmith
- Shareena Clanton as Karla Hammersmith
- Elaine Crombie as Aunty Doris
- Mercy Cornwall as Rochelle Griffin
- Khan Chittenden as Cal Roth
- Hayley McElhinney as Nadine Roth
- Jamie Ward as Lorenzo Calogero
- Catherine Moore as Miss Collard
- Jade Baynes as Bec
- Isaac Davies as Ian Orcher

== Episodes ==
No.	Title	Directed by	Written by	Original release date
1	"Apps"	Nicholas Verso	Nicholas Verso	13 February 2025
2	"Webcam"	Nicholas Verso	Nicholas Verso	13 February 2025
3	"Drive In"	Nicholas Verso	Allan Clarke	13 February 2025
4	"Sauce"	Nicholas Verso	Holden Sheppard & Nicholas Verso	13 February 2025
5	"The Date"	Nicholas Verso	Enoch Mailangi	13 February 2025
6	"The Coming Out Ball"	Nicholas Verso	Enoch Mailangi	13 February 2025
7	"Country"	Nicholas Verso	Allan Clarke	13 February 2025
8	"Cake"	Nicholas Verso	Holden Sheppard & Nicholas Verso	13 February 2025
9	"Bees"	Nicholas Verso	Declan Greene	13 February 2025
10	"Sunset"	Nicholas Verso	Nicholas Verso	13 February 2025

== Production ==
The series is based on the novel of the same name written by Holden Sheppard, which was optioned by Nicholas Verso in 2020.

Stan announced the drama as a commissioned series in 2023. The series was adapted, written and directed by Nicholas Verso alongside writers Enoch Mailangi, Allan Clarke, Holden Sheppard and Declan Greene. On 12 March 2024, the cast for the series was announced.

On 15 March 2024, it was announced that the series had begun production in Western Australia with the 10 part series filming in Geraldton, Western Australia. Filming locations included the Sunset Beach, Ocean Road Hotel, foreshore and Macedonian club.

The series contains some major changes to the book, particularly relating to Hammer and Matt's plotlines and moving the story to 2017 to feature the Australian same-sex marriage plebiscite. Hammer is now a First Nations character facing racism as well as his sexuality. Matt's storyline on the farm deviates significantly from the book. The female characters are also expanded and rewritten (Bec, Sabrina, Rochelle, Nadine, Karla), along with several new characters, including Aunty Doris and Ian Orcher.

== Release ==
In Australia, all episodes premiered on Stan on 13 February 2025.

Belgium broadcast the series on RTBF Auvio, with French subtitles, beginning in July 2026.

In Canada, the show became available to stream on Amazon Prime Video in September 2026.

In the US, Hulu began streaming the show in October 2026.

== Reception ==
=== Critical response ===
Stephen A. Russell for ScreenHub describes Invisible Boys as a "gloriously messy marvel I wish I’d had access to as a tortured teen." In The Conversation, Damien O'Meara noted the significance of the "gritty" and "real" representations as carrying forward the traditions of Australian teen drama. He praises the series for standing against trends towards gay respectability politics, noting how "the horny gay teen isn’t hidden away in Invisible Boys – nor are his choices always comfortable."

The series does face some criticism for its engagement with experiences of trauma. Giselle Au-Nhien Nguyen from Guardian Australia critiques ways Invisible Boys "begins to play into the cliche that queerness and relentless trauma go hand in hand, and veers close to trauma porn with a major plot event."

== Future ==
The adaptation of Invisible Boys was initially produced and marketed as a limited series. In September 2025, Verso announced on Twitter that Invisible Boys had not been renewed for a second season. The sequel to the source material, Yeah The Boys, was published in April 2026. In June 2026, it was announced by Holden Sheppard that the screen rights to Yeah The Boys had been secured by Deadset Pictures. Nicholas Verso does not appear to be involved in the adaption of Yeah The Boys.
