= Aydan Calafiore =

Australian singer (born 2000)

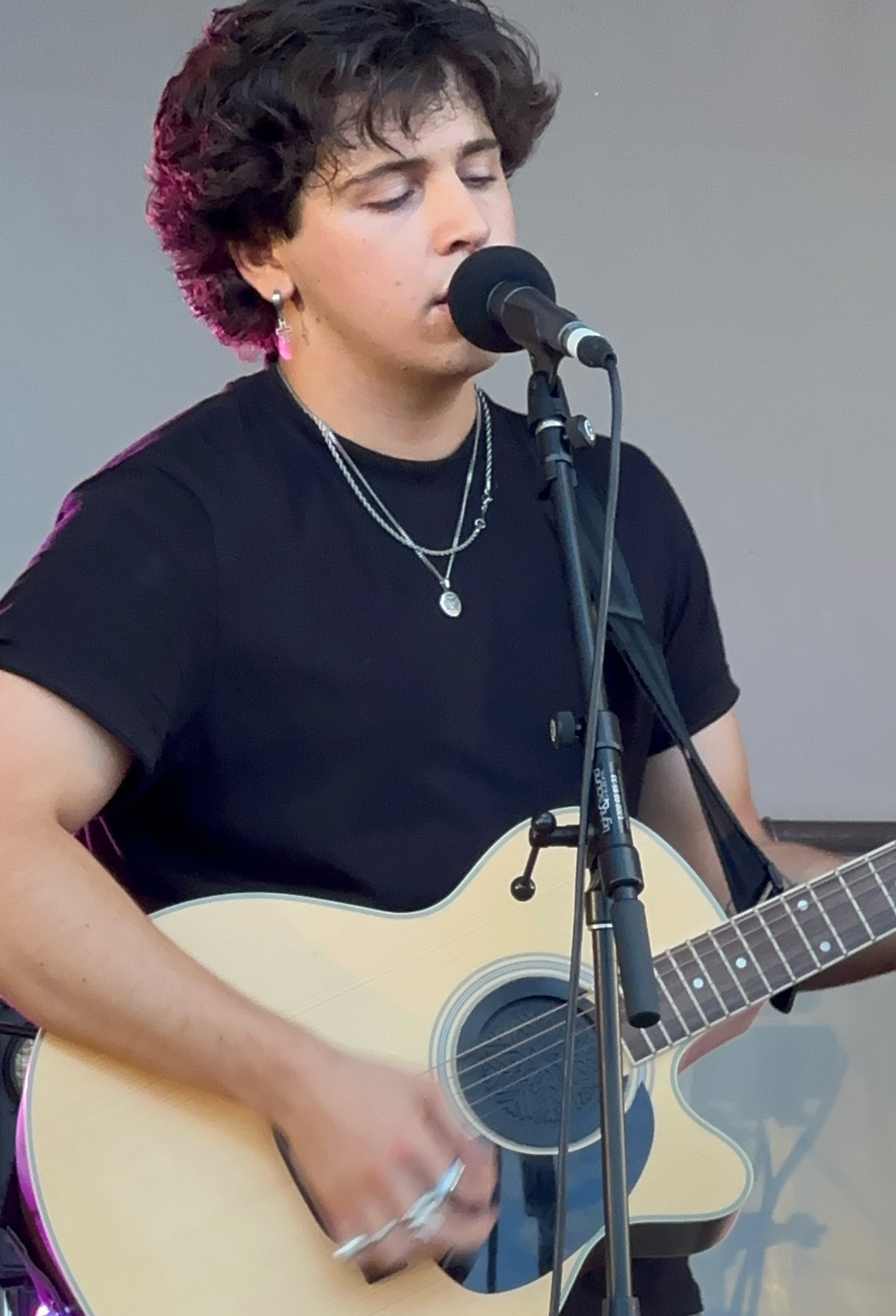
- Calafiore in 2023

Background information
- Born: 28 October 2000 (age 25)
- Origin: Melbourne, Australia
- Genre: Pop
- Occupations: Singer and actor
- Years active: 2012–present

Aydan Calafiore (born 28 October 2000), also known mononymously as Aydan, is a Melbourne-born singer, songwriter, and performer whose career spans TV, theatre, and music. Rising to prominence as a finalist on The Voice Australia and later competing in Eurovision – Australia Decides, Calafiore has gone on to release a string of original songs including Consequences (2024) and Walls (2025).

Calafiore recently starred in the Stan Original Series Invisible Boys (2025).

== Personal life ==
Calafiore resides in Moonee Ponds, Victoria, with his parents, Melanie and Phil Calafiore, and two sisters, Sam and Madi.

== Career ==
=== 2012: Young Talent Time ===
In 2012 Calafiore was the youngest cast member of Network Ten’s reboot of Young Talent Time at eleven. When the show finished in May, he went on tour with his fellow cast members and performed in live performances.

=== 2013: Australia's Got Talent ===
In 2013 Calafiore auditioned for Australia's Got Talent season 7, singing Justin Bieber's 'As Long as You Love Me'. He made it to the semi-finals, where he performed 'Classic' by MKTO, and was eliminated in the first semi-final in September.

=== 2017–18: The Voice ===
In 2017 Calafiore auditioned for the sixth season of The Voice Australia. He sang "Say You Won't Let Go" by James Arthur during his Blind audition, but failed to make a team as none of the coaches turned their chairs.

In 2018, Calafiore returned and auditioned for the seventh season of The Voice Australia, where he turned all four chairs during his audition and joined Joe Jonas' team. He made it to the final of the competition on June 17, 2018, and finished in fourth place.

The Voice performances and results (2018)
Episode	Song	Original Artist	Result
Audition	"Despacito"	Luis Fonsi ft. Daddy Yankee & Justin Bieber	Through to The Knockouts
The Knockouts	"Side to Side"	Ariana Grande ft. Nicki Minaj	Through to Battle Rounds
Battle Rounds	"Uptown Funk"(Vs Madi Krstevski)	Mark Ronson ft. Bruno Mars	Through to live shows
Live show 1	"Can't Feel My Face"	The Weeknd	Saved by public
Live show 2	"Wanna Be Startin' Somethin'"	Michael Jackson	Saved by public
Live show 3	"You Are the Reason"	Calum Scott	Saved by public
Semi-final	"Pray for Me"	The Weeknd ft. Kendrick Lamar	Saved by public
Grand Final	"Runaway Baby"	Bruno Mars	4th place
Grand Final	Shut Up and Dance" (with Joe Jonas)	Walk the Moon	4th place

In July 2018, Calafiore released "Something About You" on Universal Music Australia.

=== Eurovision – Australia Decides ===
On 18 December 2018 it was confirmed that Calafiore would perform on the Gold Coast as a contestant in Eurovision - Australia Decides. In January 2019 Calafiore released "Dust" as his entry to represent Australia at the Eurovision Song Contest 2019. He finished 6th place in the public vote and 4th place in the jury panel, finishing in 6th place.

=== Fangirls ===
Calafiore performed as Harry, from the biggest boy band True Connection, in the 2019 and 2021 tours of Yve Blake's musical, Fangirls. The album came out on April 30, 2021, though he could not star as Harry, so his role was taken over by Blake Appelqvist.

=== Jagged Little Pill ===
Calafiore played the character Phoenix, a high school heartthrob, in the Australian cast of Jagged Little Pill in the 2021 and 2022 Australian tours.

=== Invisible Boys ===
Calafiore played the character Zeke, one of the gay teens in a Stan TV series, Invisible Boys which was released on February 13, 2025.

== Discography ==
=== Singles ===
Title	Year	Peak chart positions	Album
Title	Year	AUS	Album
"Something About You"	2018	–	Non-album single
"Dust"	2019	–	Australia Decides
"Wide Awake"	2020	–	Non-album singles
"Me You and Tequila" (with DJ Tigerlily)	2020	–	Non-album singles
"Grow Up!"	2021	–	Non-album singles
"Lost with You"	2022	–	Non-album singles
"Everything to Me"	2022	–	Non-album singles
"Consequences"	2024	–	Non-album singles
"—" denotes releases that did not chart or were not released.
