= Joe Klocek =

Australian actor (born 1995)

- Born: 24 June 1995 (age 31); Brisbane, Queensland, Australia
- Occupation: Actor
- Years active: 2016–present

Joe Klocek (born 24 June 1995) is an Australian actor. He is known for his roles in the television series Nowhere Boys (2016–2018), as well as his role in the film The Dry (2020).

Klocek has also appeared in the TV shows Barracuda, Please Like Me (both 2016), Glitch (2017), Harrow, Life of Jess and Patricia Moore (all 2018). He has also appeared in the films Pirates of the Caribbean: Dead Men Tell No Tales (2017) and Children of the Corn (2020).

== Early life ==
Klocek was born in Brisbane to parents Roly and Judy. He has an older brother and grew up in the Brisbane suburb of Chapel Hill. Klocek and his brother were both born with a progressive genetic liver disease. Klocek received a liver transplant in 2005, at 10 years old. Klocek attended Kenmore State High School where he studied drama. He later joined Queensland Theatre's Youth Ensemble program.

== Career ==
In 2017, Klocek had a guest role as Evan Lewis in the Australian soap opera Neighbours. He rejoined the cast as Byron Stone in 2022.

In 2021, Klocek starred as Eli Bell in the stage adaptation of Trent Dalton's novel Boy Swallows Universe. The production became the best-selling show in Queensland Theatre’s history.

In 2024, Klocek was announced as part of the cast for Stan series Invisible Boys. On 19 July, Klocek was named as part of the cast for Territory.

== Filmography ==
=== Film ===
Year	Title	Role	Notes
2017	Pirates of the Caribbean: Dead Men Tell No Tales	Young Monarch Soldier	
2020	Children of the Corn	Calder Colvington	
2020	The Dry	Young Aaron Falk	
2022	The Aussie Boys	Isaac	

=== Television ===
Year	Title	Role	Notes	Ref
2016	Barracuda	Tsitsas	2 episodes	
2016	Please Like Me	Dustin	Episode: "Porridge"	
2016–2018	Nowhere Boys	Heath Buckland	26 episodes	
2017	Neighbours	Evan Lewis	Guest role; 5 episodes	
2017	Glitch	Josh	2 episodes	
2018	Harrow	Sean Paulson	Episode: "Peccata Patris"	
2018	Life of Jess	Cooper	Episode: "The Most Embarrassing High School Moment"	
2018	Patricia Moore	Toby	8 episodes	
2022	Neighbours	Byron Stone	13 episodes	
2024	My Lady Jane	Fitz	5 episodes	
2024	Territory	Lachie Kirby	6 episodes	
2025	Invisible Boys	Matt Jones	10 episodes	
2025	Sherlock & Daughter	Michael Wylie/Dan Moriarty	Recurring	

== Stage credits ==
Year	Title	Role	Notes
2015	Oedipus Doesn't Live Here Anymore	Chorus 4	Bille Brown Studio, Brisbane with QTC
2021	Boy Swallows Universe	Eli Bell	Playhouse, Brisbane
2022	Touching the Void	Joe	Southbank Theatre, Melbourne with MTC
