= Aquarius Films =

Australian entertainment company

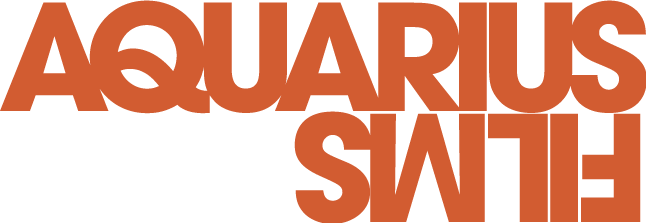
- Company type: Private
- Industry: Entertainment
- Founded: December 2, 2008
- Founders: Angie Fielder; Polly Staniford
- Defunct: 2025
- Fate: Dissolved
- Headquarters: Sydney, Australia
- Area served: Worldwide
- Key people: Angie Fielder (producer); Polly Staniford (producer)
- Products: Motion pictures; Television programs
- Services: Film production; Television production
- Website: aquariusfilms.com.au

Aquarius Films was an independent Australian film and TV production company based in Sydney, founded in 2008 by producers Angie Fielder and Polly Staniford. TV credits include Love Me, The Unusual Suspects, The Other Guy and Savage River. Film credits include Lion starring Dev Patel and Nicole Kidman, produced by Aquarius in association with See-Saw Films and the psychological thriller Berlin Syndrome starring Teresa Palmer and directed by Cate Shortland which premiered at Sundance Film Festival, Dirt Music, directed by Gregor Jordan and starring Garrett Hedlund, Kelly Macdonald and David Wenham and Wish You Were Here, starring Joel Edgerton and Teresa Palmer, which premiered at Sundance Film Festival and won two Australian Academy of Cinema and Television Arts (AACTA) Awards, including Best Screenplay, and five Film Critics Circle Awards, including Best Film.

Romantic drama series Love Me starring Hugo Weaving, by Aquarius for Warner Bros. Australia and Foxtel's Binge, premiered in the US on Hulu in April 2021, and premiered on Binge in December 2021. Miniseries The Unusual Suspects starring Miranda Otto and Aina Dumlao is streaming on Hulu and premiered on SBS in June 2021 and their 10 x 30’ YA series for the Australian Broadcasting Corporation, Born to Spy, premiered in December 2021. Additional television credits include The Other Guy Seasons 1 and 2, a 6 x 30’ comedy-drama, for Stan and Hulu starring Matt Okine, Valene Kane and Harriet Dyer and The Unlisted, a 15 x 30’ YA sci-fi thriller for Netflix and the ABC. Aquarius Film's final productions were Savage River, a 6 x 1' crime drama series directed by Jocelyn Moorhouse and starring Katherine Langford in 2022 for the ABC, and the 4 x 1hr mini series Mix Tape directed by Lucy Gaffy screened on Binge, Foxtel, BBC2, BBC iPlayer and RTE in 2025 which won the TV Spotlight Audience Award at the 2025 SXSW Film & Television.

Aquarius Films received the 2018 NSW Creative Laureate and the 2018 SPA Screen Business Export of the Year Award. In 2022 Aquarius was nominated for two SPA awards; Screen Business Export of the Year and Telemovie or Mini-series Production of the Year for their production The Unusual Suspects.

In August 2025, Fielder and Staniford announced they would wind down the company.

== Productions ==
=== Film ===
Year	Film	Director	Writer	Notes
2012	Wish You Were Here	Kieran Darcy-Smith	Kieran Darcy-Smith & Felicity Price	Official selection - Sundance Film Festival 2012; 8 Nominations – AACTA Awards; 8 Nominations – FCCA Award; 8 Nominations – Australian Film Critics Association AFCA; Nominated – Bronze Horse Best Film Stockholm Film Festival; Nominated – Sundance Film Festival Grand Jury Prize World Cinema Dramatic; Winner – AACTA Award for Best Original Screenplay; Winner – AACTA Award for Best Supporting Actor; Winner – AFCA Award for Best Actor; Winner – Australian Screen Sound Guild Best Achievement for Sound; Winner – FCCA Awards x 5 including Best Film
2016	Lion	Garth Davis	Luke Davies	Nominated – Academy Award for Best Picture; Nominated – Dev Patel; Nominated – Nicole Kidman; Nominated – Academy Award for Best Adapted Screenplay; Nominated – Academy Award for Best Cinematography; Nominated – Academy Award for Best Original Score; Nominated – Golden Globe Award for Best Drama Motion Picture; Nominated – Golden Globe Award for Supporting Actress in a Motion Picture Nicole Kidman; Nominated – Golden Globe Award for Supporting Actor in a Motion Picture Dev Patel; Nominated – Golden Globe Award for Original Score; Winner – British Academy Film Award Best Supporting Actor Dev Patel; Winner – British Academy Film Award Best Adapted Screenplay; Winner – AACTA Awards x 12; Winner – Directors Guild of America Award for Outstanding Directorial Achievement in Feature; Premiere – Toronto Film Festival
2017	Berlin Syndrome	Cate Shortland	Cate Shortland	8 Nominations – AACTA Awards inc Best Film & Best Director; 5 Nominations – AFCA Awards inc Best Film & Best Director; 2 Nominations – Australian Screen Sound Guild ASSC; 6 Nominations – Film Critics Circle of Australia FCCA Award; Nominated – AWGE Award for best writing; Nominated – Dallas International Film Festival Grand Jury Prize; Nominated – Sundance Film Festival Grand Jury Prize World Cinema; Winner – FCCA Award Best Original Score; Premiere – Sundance Film Festival
2019	Dirt Music	Gregor Jordan	Jack Thorne	Nominated – AACTA Award Best Original Score; Premiere – Toronto International Film Festival

=== Television ===
Year	Show	Writer	Director	Notes
2019	The Unlisted 15 x 30'	Justine Flynn, Lucy Gaffy, Rhys Graham, Rebecca O’Brien, Neil Sharma, Nicholas Verso	Jane Allen, Tristram Baumber, Nicholas Brown, Rhys Graham, Mithila Gupta, Chris Kunz, Timothy Lee, Alice McCredie-Dando, Natasha Somasundaram, Greg Water.	Winner – Prix Jeunesse International Youth Jury Prize; Winner – Kidscreen Best Inclusivity Award; Winner – Australian Screen Sound Guild Award Best Sound for a Children’s Program; 3 Nominations – AACTA Awards including Best Children’s Program; 2 Nominations – ADG Awards
2017- 2019	The Other Guy 12 x 30' Seasons 1 & 2	Kacie Anning, Gracie Otto	Kacie Anning, Tristram Baumber, Becky Lucas, Matt Okine	Nominated – Logie Award Most Outstanding Drama Series; Nominated – Logie Award Most Popular Drama Program; Nominated – AACTA Best Comedy Series; Nominated – AACTA Best New Talent
2021	Born to Spy 10 x 30'	Created by Justine Flynn, written by Tiffany Zehnal, Tristram Baumber, Michelle Lim Davidson, Melissa Lee Speyer, Undi Lee, David D.S. Park, Sophia Chung, Alice McCredie-Dando, Hyun Lee, Justine Flynn		Produced in Association with Buster Productions
2021	The Unusual Suspects 4 x 60'	Roger Monk, Vonne Patiag, Jessica Redenback	Natalie Bailey, Melvin J Montalban	Nominated – AACTA Best Miniseries.; Nominated – Australian Directors Guild Best Direction in a TV miniseries; Nominated – Screen Producers Australia Miniseries Production of the Year; Nominated – Logie Award for Most Outstanding Miniseries
2021	Love Me 6 x 45'	Based on Swedish Series Alska Mig Created by Josaphine Bornebusch Blake Ayshford, Alison Bell, Leon Ford, Adele Vuko	Emma Freeman	Winner – Logie Outstanding Supporting Actress Heather Mitchell; Nominated – Logie Outstanding Drama Series; Nominated – Logie Popular Drama Program; Nominated – Logie Outstanding Actor; Nominated – Logie Outstanding Newcomer; Nominated – Logie Popular Actor; Nominated – Logie Popular Actress; Nominated – AACTA Awards Best Drama series; Nominated – AACTA Awards Best Direction in Drama; Nominated – AACTA Awards Best Screenplay in TV; Nominated – AACTA Awards Best Lead Actress Bojana Novakovic; Nominated – AACTA Awards Best Lead Actor Hugo Weaving; Nominated – AACTA Awards Best Supporting Actress Heather Mitchell; Nominated – AACTA Awards Best Casting; Nominated – AACTA Awards Best Cinematography; Nominated – AACTA Awards Best Costume Design TV; Nominated – AACTA Awards Best Production Design TV
2022	Savage River 6 x 60'	Giula Sandler, Franz Docherty, Angie Fielder, Polly Staniford, Belinda Bradley	Jocelyn Moorhouse	Nominated - Logie Awards Most Popular Drama Series, Miniseries or Telemovie; Winner – Screen Producers Australia Telemovie or Mini Series Production of the Year; Winner – AACTA Awards Best Original Score - Bryony Marks Bryony Marks; Nominated – AACTA Awards Best Miniseries; Nominated – AACTA Awards Best Supporting Actress; Nominated – AACTA Awards Best Sound; Nominated - CGA Awards - Best Casting; Nominated - C21 Drama Awards - Best Mini Series
2025	Mix Tape 4 x 60'	Jo Spain	Lucy Gaffy	Winner – SXSW TV Spotlight Audience Award
