= Mix Tape (miniseries) =

Irish-Australian television series

- Genre: Romance
- Based on: Mix Tape by Jane Sanderson
- Screenplay by: Jo Spain
- Directed by: Lucy Gaffy
- Starring: Teresa Palmer; Jim Sturgess; Florence Hunt; Rory Walton-Smith
- Countries of origin: Australia; Ireland
- Original language: English
- No. of series: 1
- No. of episodes: 4

Production
- Executive producers: Alison Hurbert-Burns; Lana Greenhalgh; Clare Mirabello; David Fortier; Ivan Schneeberg; Nick Nantell; Erik Pack
- Producers: Aoife O'Sullivan; Tristan Orpen Lynch; Angie Fielder; Polly Staniford
- Production companies: Foxtel Group; Aquarius Films; Subotica; Boat Rocker Studios

Original release
- Network: Binge
- Release: 12 June – 3 July 2025

Mix Tape is a romance television miniseries starring Teresa Palmer and Jim Sturgess, which premiered on Binge on 12 June 2025. It is adapted from the novel of the same title by Jane Sanderson and recounts the story of a couple who fell in love in the late 1980s and reconnect decades later whilst on opposite sides of the world.

== Premise ==
In Sheffield in 1989, a blossoming romance develops between Alison and Daniel. Many years later, and living on opposite sides of the world, they reconnect over their shared memories of music.

== Cast and characters ==
- Teresa Palmer as Alison
  - Florence Hunt as Young Alison
- Jim Sturgess as Daniel
  - Rory Walton-Smith as Young Daniel
- Conor Sánchez as Young Peter, Allison's brother
- Ben Lawson as Michael, Alison's husband
- Julia Savage as Stella, daughter of Alison and Michael
- Sara Soulie as Katja, wife of Daniel
- Mark O'Halloran as Bill, Daniel's father
- Helen Behan as Marian
- Jonathan Harden as Martin
- Siobhan O'Kelly as Catherine
- Alexis Rodney as Duncan
- Jacqueline McKenzie as Sheila
- Chika Ikogwe as Cass, Allison's agent in Sydney

== Production ==
The project was announced in August 2023, as a collaboration between Screen Australia, Screen Ireland, and Binge. The four-part series is directed by Lucy Gaffy and adapted by Jo Spain from the Jane Sanderson novel Mix Tape. It is produced by Australia's Foxtel Group and Aquarius Films, and the Irish company Subotica with Eccho Rights was set to distribute the series internationally. The series is produced by Aoife O'Sullivan and Tristan Orpen Lynch for Subotica and Angie Fielder and Polly Staniford for Aquarius Films. Executive producers include Alison Hurbert-Burns, Lana Greenhalgh, Clare Mirabello, David Fortier, Ivan Schneeberg, Nick Nantell, and Erik Pack as Canadian production company Boat Rocker Media, while it replaced Eccho Rights joined the series as co-producer and would handle international distribution to the series .

Teresa Palmer and Jim Sturgess were confirmed in the cast in May 2024. Florence Hunt and Rory Walton-Smith joined the cast in June 2024.

Filming took place in Sydney, Australia in May 2024. Filming took place in Dublin and County Wicklow in Ireland in June and July 2024.

== Broadcast ==
In Australia, the series was announced to be broadcast on streaming service Binge. In October 2024, it was confirmed that the series would debut in June 2025. Mix Tape premiered on 12 June 2025.

On 11 June 2025, BBC announced they had acquired the show for iPlayer and BBC Two for 15 July 2025.

== Reception ==
Luke Buckmaster, writing in The Guardian, gave the series 4 stars out of 5, praising the performances of the four lead actors, and writing that the series "is staged with lightness of touch and is a real pleasure to watch". Craig Matheson, writing in The Age, gave it 3 out of 5 stars, writing "It's not subtle, but it's effective". ScreenHub Australia called the series "resonant and real". Digital Spy found the ending clichéd.

Ben Dowell of The Times gave Mix Tape only 2 out of 5 stars, calling it "a one-dimensional mash-up of David Nicholls's One Day and Nick Hornby's High Fidelity, with a cheery side order of Full Monty-style South Yorkshire setting". The Irish Times called it "a bit of a muddle", criticising its lack of authenticity in the Dublin-based scenes, and the implausible plotline.

In 2026 Mix Tape won Best Soundtrack at the 15th AACTA Awards.

== Accolades ==
Mix Tape won the Audience Award at the 2025 SXSW festival in Austin, Texas. In March 2026, the series was nominated at the Royal Television Society Republic of Ireland Awards in the scripted category. The series was nominated for Best Miniseries or Telemovie at the 2026 Logie Awards.
