= Anya Beyersdorf =

Australian actress and screenwriter

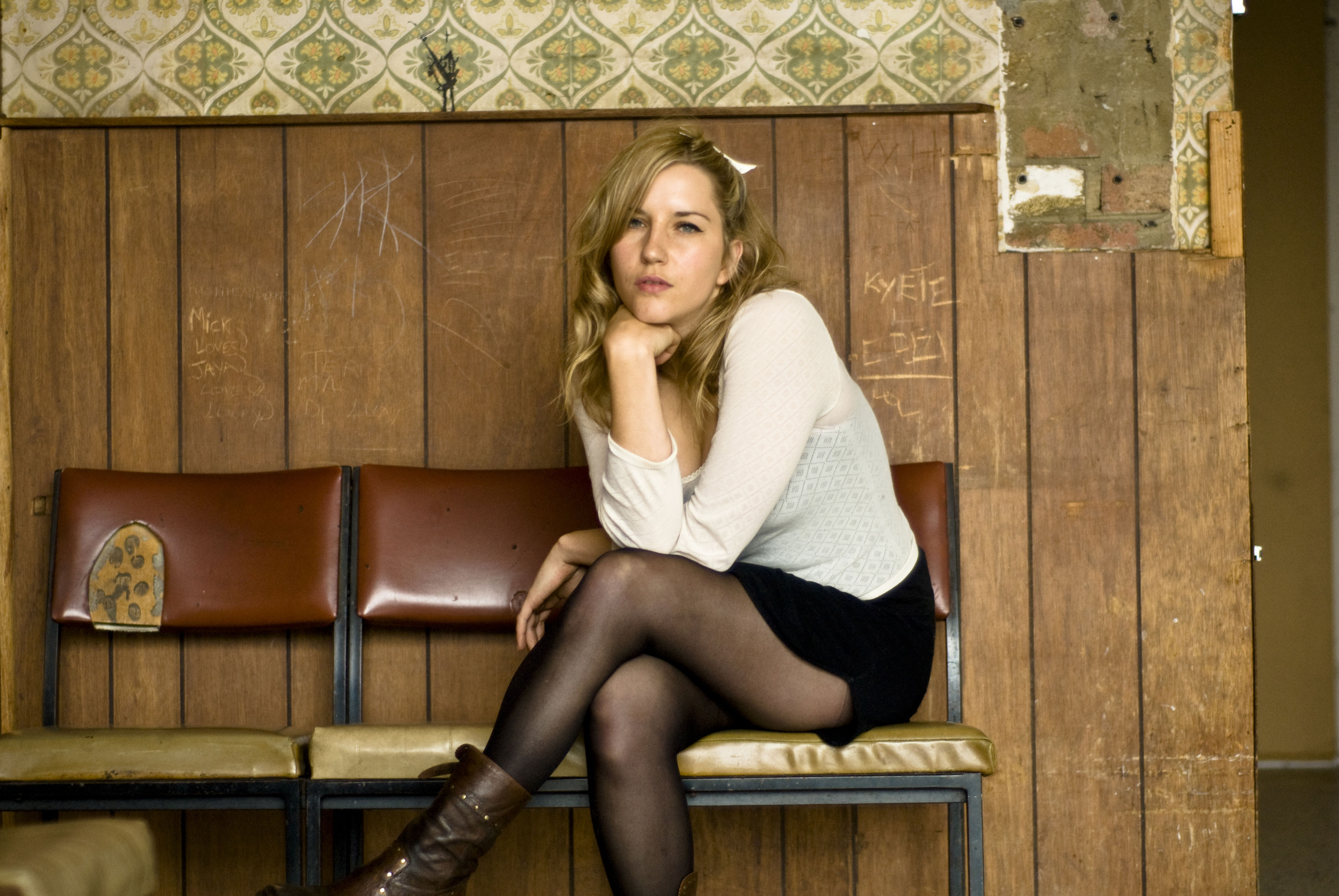
- Anya Beyersdorf
- Born: Anya Beyersdorf; Armidale, New South Wales
- Education: University of Newcastle
- Occupation(s): Actress, screenwriter, director

Anya Beyersdorf is an Australian actress and screenwriter.

== Early life and education ==
Anya Beyersdorf was born in Armidale, New South Wales. She attended Armidale High School in her high school years. However, she studied drama and communication at the University of Newcastle until she moved to Melbourne in 2003 to pursue acting.

She trained in acting and directing in the theatres of Berlin in 2009 after winning the Marten Bequest Prize for Acting for 2008/2009, working under Bulgarian director Dimiter Gotscheff on the play The Powder Keg at Der Haus der Berliner Festspiele, as well as traveling and studying performance in Poland, Denmark, and the USA.

== Career ==
Beyersdorf was one of eight actresses who played the title character Angie in John Winter's directorial debut feature film, Black & White & Sex in 2011. It was her second feature film, after Rats and Cats premiered on 15 May 2008.

Beyersdorf has acted in several short films, including playing the role of Emma in the short film Emma and the Barista. She played the lead role in the Australian Film Commission short film Love's Labour, which was nominated for a Dendy Award in 2007. She also played the role of Tamara in the short film Dugong, which was nominated for an Australian Film Institute Award in 2007.

She has appeared on the television series Stingers, Blue Heelers, Canal Road, Cops L.A.C. and Crownies.

In 2016, she directed the short film Vampir, director Tony Rogers played the lead character. In 2017, she wrote and directed the short film, "How the Light Gets In" about a woman who suddenly has an inner light. In 2019 she wrote the short film It's Me.

In 2021 she wrote the Stan series Eden and the ABC series Fires. In 2023, she was announces as the co-writer for the second season of Foxtel series The Twelve, which premiered in July 2024. Also in the same year, she was announced as co-writer for Netflix mini series Apple Cider Vinegar and the ABC documentary The Black Hand hosted by Anthony LaPaglia. In 2024, she created and wrote the TV drama, Fake for Paramount+, about a woman magazine writer who thinks she has found her perfect match.

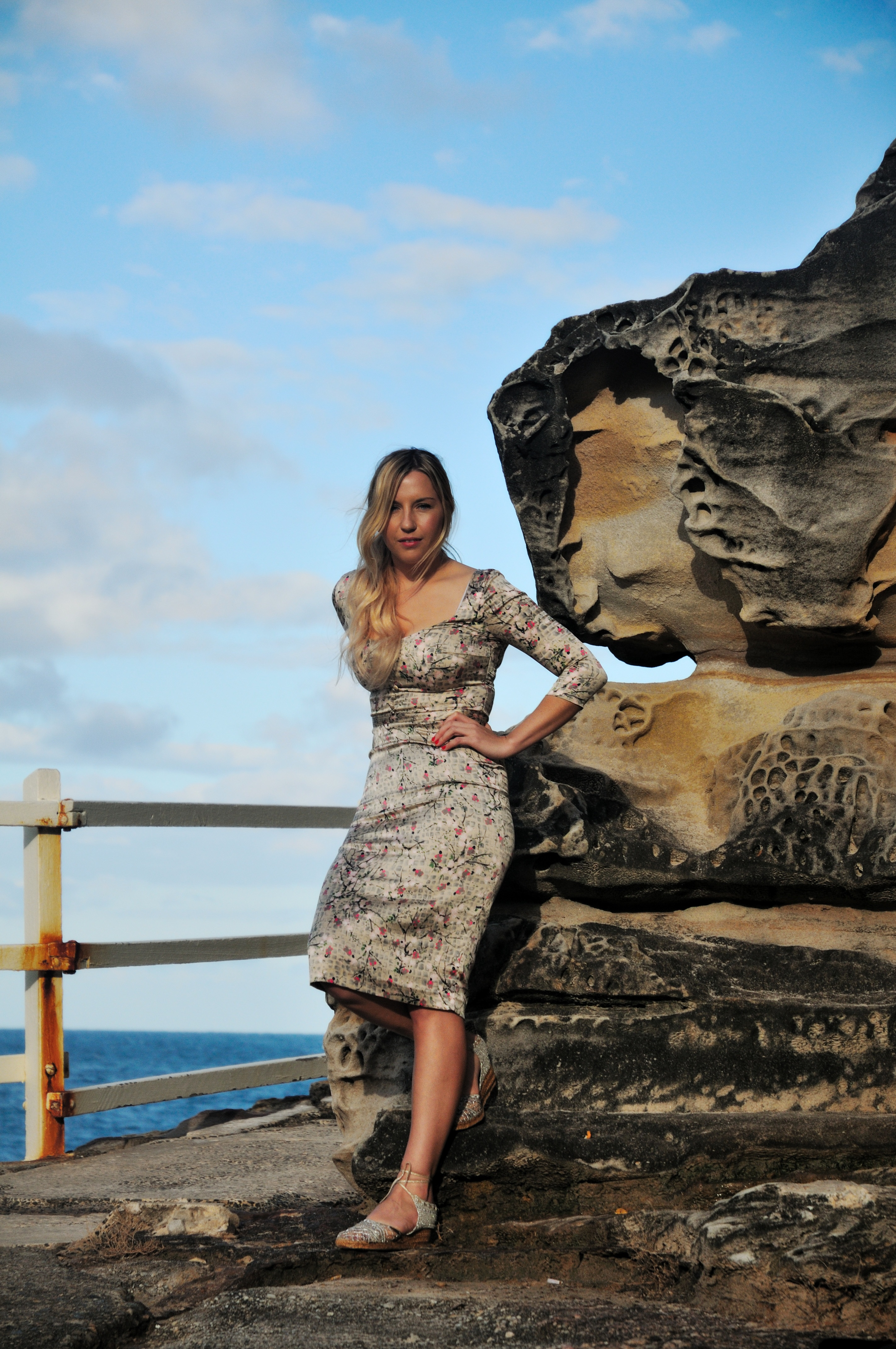
Beyersdorf in 2011

== Recognition ==
In 2014, she won an AWGIE Award - the Monte Miller Award for her screenplay Paradise.

In 2016, she was awarded one of four inaugural Lexus Australia Short Film Fellowships by the Sydney Film Festival.

She was also a Nicholl Fellowship in Screenwriting semi-finalist.

In 2022, she won another AWGIE Award - Limited Series for writing Fires.

== Personal life ==
She has an older sister named Natasha, she is a long-serving television newsreader for NBN News.

== Filmography ==
=== Film ===
Year	Film	Role
2008	Rats and Cats	Cindy
2011	Black & White & Sex	Angie 2

=== Television ===
Year	Series	Role	Episodes
2004	Stingers	Miranda Eason	1
2006	Blue Heelers	Jacqui Hatcher	1
2008	Canal Road	Tracey	1
2010	Cops L.A.C.	Skye Duncan	1
2011	Crownies	Rebecca	1

== Directing / Writing ==
=== Short films ===
Year	Film	Role
2016	Vampir	Director
2017	How the Light Gets In	Director/writer
2019	It's Me	Writer

=== Television ===
Year	Series	Role	Episodes
2021	Eden	Writer	1
2021	Fires	Writer	1
2023	The Black Hand	Co-writer	3
2024	Fake	Creator/Writer	5
2024	The Twelve	Co-writer	1
2025	Apple Cider Vinegar	Writer	1
2025	Playing Gracie Darling	Writer	
