= List of The Time of Our Lives episodes =

The Time of Our Lives is an Australian television drama. It was created by Amanda Higgs and Judi McCrossin, the co-creator and principal writer of The Secret Life of Us. It premiered on ABC on 16 June 2013. The show focuses on the Tivolli family – Luce (Shane Jacobson), Matt (William McInnes) and Chai Li (Michelle Vergara Moore) and their partners Bernadette (Justine Clarke), Caroline (Claudia Karvan) and Herb (Stephen Curry). The Time of Our Lives was renewed for a second season on 19 October 2013. The second and final season premiered on 26 June 2014. On 5 September 2014, it was announced that the ABC had cancelled The Time of Our Lives.

== Series overview ==
Series	Episodes	Originally released	
Series	Episodes	First released	Last released
1	13	16 June 2013	8 September 2013
2	8	26 June 2014	14 August 2014

== Episodes ==
=== Season 1 (2013) ===
No. overall	No. in season	Title	Directed by	Written by	Original release date	Australian viewers
1	1	"The First New Chapter"	Chris Noonan	Judi McCrossin	16 June 2013	0.935
2	2	"Flight as a Feather"	Jonathan Brough	Judi McCrossin	23 June 2013	0.947
3	3	"No More Drama"	Jonathan Brough	Judi McCrossin	30 June 2013	0.845
4	4	"A Time For Us"	Tori Garrett	Michael Miller	7 July 2013	0.838
5	5	"Pick a Little, Talk a Little"	Tori Garrett	Judi McCrossin	14 July 2013	0.819
6	6	"The Final Countdown"	Ana Kokkonos	Blake Ayshford	21 July 2013	0.862
7	7	"With You"	Ana Kokkonos	Kris Mrska	28 July 2013	0.885
8	8	"One Heart"	Kate Dennis	Judi McCrossin	4 August 2013	0.870
9	9	"Beneath Your Beautiful"	Kate Dennis	Ursula Cleary	11 August 2013	0.865
10	10	"Pure and Simple"	Steve Jodrell	Michael Miller	18 August 2013	0.889
11	11	"Sparkle"	Steve Jodrell	Judi McCrossin	25 August 2013	0.822
12	12	"More Than Words"	Ana Kokkinos	Judi McCrossin	1 September 2013	0.804
13	13	"Dance, While The Music Still Goes On"	Ana Kokkinos	Judi McCrossin	8 September 2013	0.781

=== Season 2 (2014) ===
The Time of Our Lives was renewed on 19 October 2013 for a second season of eight episodes. It aired between 26 June and 14 August 2014.

No. overall	No. in season	Title	Directed by	Written by	Original release date	Australian viewers
14	1	"The Accident"	Jonathan Brough	Judi McCrossin	26 June 2014	0.785
15	2	"The Family Tree"	Jonathan Brough	Judi McCrossin	3 July 2014	0.815
16	3	"The Negotiation"	Tori Garrett	Ursula Cleary	10 July 2014	0.760
17	4	"The Choice"	Tori Garrett	Kris Mrksa	17 July 2014	0.751
18	5	"The Dream"	Sian Davies	Judi McCrossin	24 July 2014	0.762
19	6	"The Birthday Dinner"	Fiona Banks	Kris Mrksa	31 July 2014	0.743
20	7	"The Man on the Bus"	Sian Davies	Ursula Cleary	7 August 2014	0.785
21	8	"The Proposal"	Fiona Banks	Judi McCrossin	14 August 2014	0.791
