= Dirty Laundry Live =

2013–2016 Australian television series

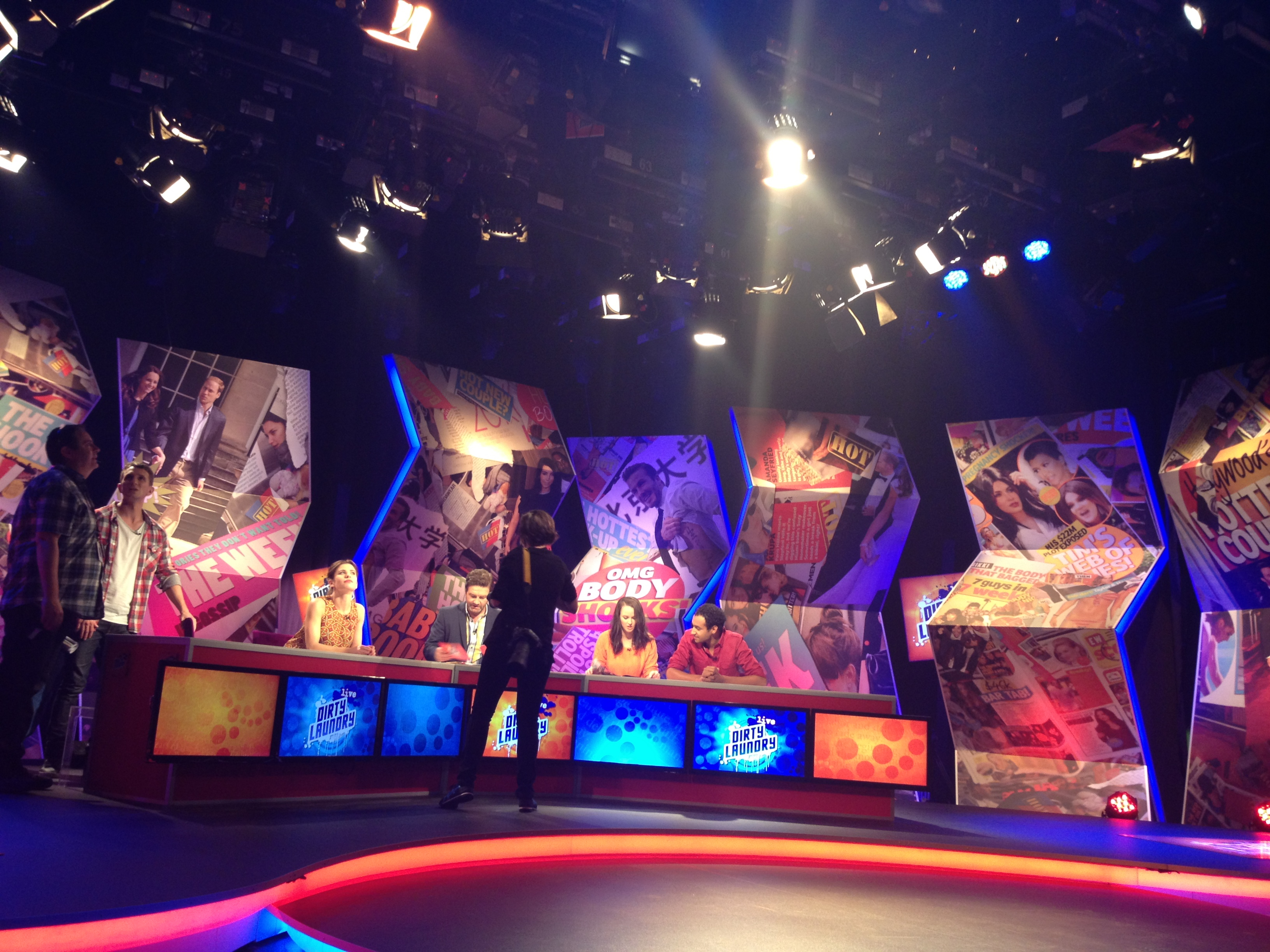
- Pilot 2
- Directed by: Jon Olb
- Presented by: Lawrence Mooney
- Starring: Brooke Satchwell
- Country of origin: Australia
- Original language: English
- No. of seasons: 3
- No. of episodes: 50

Production
- Production location: Melbourne
- Running time: 30 minutes (2013); 45 minutes (2014–2015)

Original release
- Network: ABC2
- Release: 16 May 2013 – 2016

Dirty Laundry Live is an Australian comedy panel television quiz show hosted by Lawrence Mooney. The first of 22 episodes in Season 1 screened live on Thursday 16 May 2013 at 9.30pm AEST on ABC2 (with repeats on ABC1 later in the week). It returned for 16 episodes in Season 2 the following year in the same timeslot on 15 May 2014, with longer episodes. The show was moved to ABC for Season 3 with 12 episodes from 28 May 2015 and repeats on ABC2.

The live show features four celebrity panellists, led by Brooke Satchwell. The panel are asked questions and play parlour games based on celebrity gossip and pop culture stories of the week. It also features pre-recorded interviews with celebrities by Lawrence Mooney, Luke McGregor, Ronny Chieng, and others, and segments by non-panelists, such as Sam Simmons and the 'ghost of Michael Jackson'.

== Episodes ==
Series	Episodes	Originally released	
Series	Episodes	First released	Last released
1	22	16 May 2013	2013
2	16	15 May 2014	2014
3	12	28 May 2015	2015

=== Season 1 (2013) ===
Guests featured on the panel in 2013 include Marty Sheargold, Matt Okine, Sophie Monk, Zoe Coombs Marr, Karl Chandler, Wendy Squires, Yumi Stynes, Celia Pacquola, Josh Thomas, Joel Creasey, Michael Beveridge, Kate Langbroek, Havana Brown and Eddie Perfect.

=== Season 2 (2014) ===
Guests featured on the panel in 2014 include Zoe Coombs Marr, Marty Sheargold, Tosh Greenslade, Eddie Perfect, Dave Thornton, Lally Katz, Luke McGregor, Lauren Miller, Josh Thomas, Angela Bishop, Michala Banas, Celia Pacquola, Matt Okine, Ed Kavalee and Nadia Salemme.

=== Season 3 (2015) ===
Season 3 premiered on Thursday 28 May, with regulars Marty Sheargold and Zoe Coombs Marr appearing on the first episode's panel. Other guests throughout 2015 included Ash London, Angela Bishop, Matt Okine, Joel Creasey, Richard Reid, Ronny Chieng and Gen Fricker.
