= The Time of Our Lives (TV series) =

2013–2014 Australian TV series

- Promotional artwork
- Starring: Claudia Karvan; Justine Clarke; Michelle Vergara Moore; Shane Jacobson; Stephen Curry; William McInnes
- Country of origin: Australia
- No. of episodes: 21 (list of episodes)

Production
- Running time: 60 minutes

Original release
- Network: ABC
- Release: 16 June 2013 – 14 August 2014

The Time of Our Lives is an Australian television drama series which premiered on ABC TV on 10 June 2013, at 8.30pm. It is a JAHM Pictures production in association with ABC TV and Film Victoria. The producer Amanda Higgs (co-creator of The Secret Life of Us) and principal writer Judi McCrossin (The Secret Life of Us, Tangle, The Surgeon, Beaconsfield) were also co-creators.

The show follows the lives of the Tivolli clan, an Australian extended family in inner-city Melbourne. Aged in their thirties and forties, the characters are occupied with career advancement, home ownership, child-rearing and the vagaries of relationships.

Aired in a time-slot that meant it competed with other Australian drama shows on commercial free-to-air channels, the series debuted with a "respectable" audience size. The show was renewed for a second season on 18 October 2013. The second season premiered on 26 June 2014. On 5 September 2014, it was announced that the ABC had cancelled The Time of Our Lives.

== Cast ==
=== Main cast ===
- Claudia Karvan as Caroline Tivolli
- Justine Clarke as Bernadette Flynn
- Michelle Vergara Moore as Chai Li Tivolli
- Shane Jacobson as Luce Tivolli
- Stephen Curry as Herb
- William McInnes as Matt Tivolli

With

- Tony Barry as Ray Tivolli
- Sue Jones as Rosa Tivolli
- Anita Hegh as Maryanne
- Elise MacDougall as Georgina 'Georgie' Tivolli
- Tully McGahey as Tully Tivolli
- Frances McGahey as Frances Tivolli
- Thomas Fisher as Carmody Tivolli

=== Supporting cast ===
- Pia Miranda as Kristin Glaros (Seasons 1–2)
- Catherine McClements as Diana Southey (Season 2)
- Jessica McNamee as Lisa Montago (Season 2)
- Luke McGregor as Luke (Seasons 1–2)
- Dave Lawson as Julian (Season 2)
- Mike McLeish as Mickey Mac (Seasons 1–2)
- Dion Williams as Lachie (Seasons 1–2)
- Calen Mackenzie as Jesse Reid (Seasons 1–2)
- Cheree Cassidy as Alice McQueen (Seasons 1–2)
- Tina Bursill as Lenore (Seasons 1–2)
- Michael Dorman as Joel (Season 1)
- Kate Jenkinson as Eloise (Season 1)
- Damian Walshe-Howling as Ewan (Season 1)
- Mick Molloy as Garrick Graham (Season 1)
- Georgina Naidu as Marla (Season 1)

=== Guests ===
- Alex Papps as Tom Reid (2 episodes)
- Amy Lehpamer as Esther (1 episode)
- Georgina Naidu as Marla (4 episodes)
- Nicholas Bell as Caroline's lawyer (1 episode)
- Paula Arundell as Chelsea (1 episode)
- Tony Nikolakopoulos as Anton (2 episodes)

== Awards and nominations ==
| Year | Award | Category | Nominee | Result |
|---|---|---|---|---|
| 2014 | Logie Awards | Most Outstanding Drama Series | The Time of Our Lives | Nominated |
| 2014 | Logie Awards | Most Outstanding Actress | Claudia Karvan | Nominated |
