= Toby Leonard Moore =

Australian actor

- Born: 1981 (age 44–45); Sydney, Australia
- Education: National Institute of Dramatic Art
- Occupation: Actor
- Years active: 2005–present
- Known for: Daredevil; Billions
- Spouse: Michelle Vergara Moore (m. 2019)
- Children: 1
- Mother: Robyn Moore

Toby Leonard Moore (born 1981) is an Australian actor, best known for his roles as Bryan Connerty in the Showtime series Billions (2016–2023) and James Wesley in the Marvel Cinematic Universe series Daredevil (2015) and Daredevil: Born Again (2026). He also appears as Victor in the film John Wick (2014), and in the miniseries The Unusual Suspects (2021), an Australian production airing on SBS.

== Early life ==
Moore was born in Sydney, Australia, the son of voice actress Robyn Moore. He moved with his family to Hobart, Tasmania, when he was young, where he attended St Virgil's College. Moore began acting in the Hobart theatre scene before graduating from the National Institute of Dramatic Art in 2005 with a degree in acting.

== Career ==
Moore's initial film work involved dubbing Chinese-language films into English. In 2009, he was cast in a small role in the Joss Whedon series Dollhouse, and in 2010, a recurring role in the World War II miniseries The Pacific. In 2015, he appeared in Daredevil as James Wesley, the right hand man and best friend of Wilson Fisk. From 2016 to 2023, he appeared in Billions as Bryan Connerty.

== Personal life ==
Moore is married to Australian actress Michelle Vergara Moore.

== Filmography ==
=== Film ===
Year	Title	Role	Notes
2005	The Promise	Wuhan	Voice
2006	Rob-B-Hood	Octopus	Voice
2007	Murder in the Outback	Paul Falconio	TV film
2014	John Wick	Victor	
2020	Mank	David O. Selznick	
2021	American Insurrection	The Founder	
2024	The Moogai	Dr Barnes	

=== Television ===
Year	Title	Role	Notes
2009	Dollhouse	Walton	Episode: "Gray Hour"
2010	Legend of the Seeker	Prince Fyren	Episode: "Torn"
2010	The Pacific	2nd Lt. Stone / Sgt. Stone	6 episodes
2010	Underbelly: The Golden Mile	Sergeant Dave	5 episodes
2010	Blue Bloods	Dick Reed	Episode: "Re-Do"
2012	NYC 22	Nick Reynolds	Episode: "Playing God"
2013	Banshee	Christopher Hanson	Episode: "The Rave"
2014	Robot Chicken	Peter Pan, Pi Patel (voice)	Episode: "Victoria's Secret of NIMH"
2014	White Collar	Jim Boothe / Cowboy Boots	2 episodes
2015	Daredevil	James Wesley	10 episodes
2016–2023	Billions	Bryan Connerty	61 episodes
2017	Bull	Mr. Andrew Withrow	Episode: "What's Your Number?"
2020	Condor	Gordon Piper	8 episodes
2021	The Unusual Suspects	Jordan Waters	4 episodes
2022	Mystery Road: Origin	Abe	6 episodes
2023	The Blacklist	Congressman Arthur Hudson	8 episodes
2023–25	Bay of Fires	Jeremiah	15 episodes
2025–26	Law & Order	Jack Drell	2 episodes
2026	Daredevil: Born Again	James Wesley	2 episodes
