= Black & White & Sex =

2011 film by John Winter

- Australian theatrical poster
- Directed by: John Winter
- Written by: John Winter
- Produced by: Melissa Beauford; John Winter
- Starring: Katherine Hicks; Anya Beyersdorf; Valerie Bader; Roxane Wilson; Michelle Vergara Moore; Dina Panozzo; Saskia Burmeister; Maia Thomas; Matt Holmes
- Cinematography: Nicola Daley
- Edited by: Adrian Rostirolla
- Music by: Caitlin Yeo
- Production companies: All at Once; Wintertime Films
- Distributed by: Titan View
- Release dates: June 2011 (Sydney Film Festival); 27 January 2012
- Running time: 94 minutes
- Country: Australia
- Language: English

Black & White & Sex is a 2011 Australian feature film produced by Melissa Beauford. It is the directorial debut of John Winter, best known as the producer of Rabbit Proof Fence, Paperback Hero and Doing Time for Patsy Cline. The film premiered at the Sydney Film Festival in June 2011 with its international premiere at the 41st International Film Festival Rotterdam (2012).

== Cast ==
- Katherine Hicks as Angie 1
- Anya Beyersdorf as Angie 2
- Valerie Bader as Angie 3
- Roxane Wilson as Angie 4
- Michelle Vergara Moore as Angie 5
- Dina Panozzo as Angie 6
- Saskia Burmeister as Angie 7
- Maia Thomas as Angie 8
- Matt Holmes as The Interviewer

== Development ==
Black & White & Sex follows a film-within-a-film structure. The entire 94 minutes is a two hander interview between a documentary filmmaker (played by Matt Holmes) and a sex worker, Angie. Eight different facets of Angie's personality are exposed by eight actresses: Katherine Hicks, Anya Beyersdorf, Valerie Bader, Roxane Wilson, Michelle Vergara Moore, Dina Panozzo, Saskia Burmeister and Maia Thomas.

As the name suggests, Black & White & Sex is shot entirely in black and white.

== Synopsis ==
A filmmaker is shooting a documentary about sex. He interviews a sex worker, Angie. As she reveals herself, layer-by-layer, she also exposes the man who is interviewing her.

== Production ==
Black & White & Sex was shot using a four-camera set up. Each scene was rehearsed before the shoot, but not on the day of the shoot. This meant the actors were "free to roam and be very much in the moment".

== Release ==
Black & White & Sex premiered at the Sydney Film Festival on Saturday 18 June 2011. It was listed by several bloggers and publications as one of the top 5 films that must be seen at the Festival. It was picked up by distributor Titan View, who released the film in Australia/New Zealand in 2012, and by international sales agent, Shoreline Entertainment.

The film had its international premiere at the 41st International Film Festival Rotterdam. followed by a number of other festivals including selection in the New Talent Competition at the Taipei Film Festival

The film won the 'Best Experimental' award at the 2012 ATOM Awards.
