= Rosehaven =

Australian comedy television series

- Genre: Comedy
- Created by: Celia Pacquola; Luke McGregor
- Written by: Celia Pacquola; Luke McGregor
- Directed by: Jonathan Brough; Shaun Wilson
- Starring: Celia Pacquola; Luke McGregor
- Country of origin: Australia
- Original language: English
- No. of series: 5
- No. of episodes: 40

Production
- Executive producers: Kevin Whyte; Rick Kalowski; Brett Sleigh
- Producers: Andy Walker; Fiona McConaghy
- Production locations: Huon Valley, Tasmania
- Running time: 30 minutes
- Production companies: What Horse? productions; Guesswork Television; Screen Tasmania; SundanceTV

Original release
- Network: ABC
- Release: 12 October 2016 – 22 September 2021

Rosehaven is an Australian television comedy series created and written by Celia Pacquola and Luke McGregor, who also star in the lead roles. Set in the titular fictional rural Tasmanian town, Pacquola and McGregor star as Emma and Daniel, friends who return to Rosehaven to help run Daniel's family's real estate business.

The show premiered on 12 October 2016 on ABC TV, the series finished after its fifth season on 22 September 2021.

== Plot ==
Daniel returns to his hometown in Tasmania, fictional 'Rosehaven', to help his mother, Barbara, run the family real estate business. His friend Emma turns up after being left by her husband during their honeymoon. The series draws its inspiration from McGregor's parents, who have worked in real estate in Tasmania since 1986.

== Cast ==
=== Main ===
- Luke McGregor as Daniel McCallum
- Celia Pacquola as Emma Dawes
- Kris McQuade as Barbara McCallum
- Katie Robertson as Grace
- David Quirk as Damien
- Kim Knuckey as Greg
- Noela Foxcroft as Mrs Marsh
- Sam Cotton as Bruce
- Susie Youssef as Gez
- Anthony Morgan as Phil

=== Recurring / guests ===
- Stephen Hunter as John (Season 1)
- Gabrielle Adkins as Olive (Seasons 1-5)
- Elaine Crombie as Gail (Season 2)
- Georgina Naidu as Jocelyn (Season 2, 4)
- Tony Briggs as Brian (Season 3)
- Tracy Mann as Karina (Season 3)
- Norman Coburn as Gareth (Season 3)
- Debra Lawrance as Sandra (Season 3)
- Geneviève Picot as Jenny (Season 3)
- Shareena Clanton as Suzanne (Season 3)
- Dustin Clare as Farmer Dan (Season 3)
- Leah Vandenberg as Harleen (Season 3)
- Jack Charles as Duncan (Season 3)
- John Xintavelonis as Joe (Season 4)
- Alicia Gardiner as Julie (Season 4)
- Josh Quong Tart as Donovan (Season 4, 5)
- Bonnie Sveen as Jacquelyn (Season 4)
- Dennis Coard as John (Season 4)
- Louise Siversen as Kerry (Season 4)
- Zahra Newman as Amy (Season 4, 5)
- Nicholas Colla as Ryan (Season 4)
- Morgana O'Reilly as Pen (Season 4)
- Geraldine Hickey as Pippa (Season 4)
- Ben Winspear as Sam (Season 4, 5)
- Pamela Rabe as Margaret (Season 5)
- Vivienne Awosoga as Lena (Season 5)
- Katrina Milosevic as Jana (Season 5)

== Episodes ==
Series	Episodes	Originally released	
Series	Episodes	First released	Last released
1	8	12 October 2016	30 November 2016
2	8	25 October 2017	13 December 2017
3	8	30 January 2019	13 March 2019
4	8	8 July 2020	26 August 2020
5	8	4 August 2021	22 September 2021

=== Series 1 (2016) ===
No. overall	No. in series	Title	Directed by	Written by	Original release date	Australian viewers
1	1	"Episode 1"	Jonathan Brough	Luke McGregor and Celia Pacquola	12 October 2016	603,000
Daniel returns to his rural Tasmanian hometown to help his mother, Barbara, with her real-estate business. To his surprise, his best friend Emma turns up on his doorstep on the run from her marriage.
2	2	"Episode 2"	Jonathan Brough	Luke McGregor and Celia Pacquola	19 October 2016	508,000
It's Daniel and Emma's first day in charge of the office and already they are facing unique difficulties of running a real-estate agency in a small town.
3	3	"Episode 3"	Jonathan Brough	Luke McGregor and Celia Pacquola	26 October 2016	457,000
Emma makes life difficult for Daniel by accidentally uploading some heavily photo-shopped pictures of a property right before it's to be viewed by potential buyers.
4	4	"Episode 4"	Jonathan Brough	Luke McGregor and Celia Pacquola	2 November 2016	456,000
Daniel's childhood cubby house has been overrun by his old school bully Bruce. Emma convinces Daniel to confront Bruce and get his cubby house back.
5	5	"Episode 5"	Jonathan Brough	Luke McGregor and Celia Pacquola	9 November 2016	450,000
Barbara has returned from hospital and for the first time she and Daniel are working together. Daniel is determined to impress Barbara by expanding McCallum Real Estate's profile within the town by offering free door-to-door appraisals.
6	6	"Episode 6"	Jonathan Brough	Luke McGregor and Celia Pacquola	16 November 2016	517,000
Emma is on thin ice with Barbara after allowing a bunch of random strangers to trash her house. Emma is determined to make amends by following Daniel's advice to be more professional.
7	7	"Episode 7"	Shaun Wilson	Luke McGregor and Celia Pacquola	23 November 2016	504,000
Daniel has been opening some of Barbara's mail and discovers that McCallum Real Estate is in real financial trouble. He tells Emma he has an idea on how to make some cuts.
8	8	"Episode 8"	Jonathan Brough	Luke McGregor and Celia Pacquola	30 November 2016	454,000
As Daniel prepares to leave Rosehaven for good, an important property is trashed by tenants that he approved.

=== Series 2 (2017) ===
No. overall	No. in series	Title	Directed by	Written by	Original release date	Australian viewers
9	1	"Episode 1"	Jonathan Brough	Luke McGregor & Celia Pacquola	25 October 2017	639,000
Daniel returns to Rosehaven, to find he must yet again prove himself at McCallum Real Estate where best friend Emma has been promoted.
10	2	"Episode 2"	Jonathan Brough	Luke McGregor & Celia Pacquola	1 November 2017	592,000
Barbara won't make a speech at the local primary school (or do tuckshop duty), and a reluctant Daniel steps in. But his resolve is put to the test when he and Emma are accused of stealing.
11	3	"Episode 3"	Jonathan Brough	Luke McGregor & Celia Pacquola	8 November 2017	598,000
Emma is planning a birthday party for Daniel, while Daniel is determined to list a house for sale.
12	4	"Episode 4"	Jonathan Brough	Luke McGregor & Celia Pacquola	15 November 2017	444,000
When a blackout plunges Rosehaven into darkness, evening plans are thrown into turmoil.
13	5	"Episode 5"	Shaun Wilson	Luke McGregor & Celia Pacquola	22 November 2017	548,000
It's sales vs rentals as Daniel and Emma take sides in a neighbourly dispute. Daniel is desperate to hold on to the listing, so he agrees to help Steve, with an unusual complaint about an adornment on his neighbour's house.
14	6	"Episode 6"	Shaun Wilson	Luke McGregor & Celia Pacquola	29 November 2017	553,000
Rosehaven is under siege by a nocturnal graffiti artist. Emma is keen to investigate.
15	7	"Episode 7"	Shaun Wilson	Luke McGregor & Celia Pacquola	6 December 2017	451,000
It's the annual Rosehaven Hops Festival and Emma is determined to prove to one and all that she belongs in Rosehaven.
16	8	"Episode 8"	Shaun Wilson	Luke McGregor & Celia Pacquola	13 December 2017	414,000
Emma and Daniel are united. With his first auction looming, Emma is helping Daniel practice his auctioning skills.

=== Series 3 (2019) ===
No. overall	No. in series	Title	Directed by	Written by	Original release date	Australian viewers
17	1	"Episode 1"	Shaun Wilson	Luke McGregor and Celia Pacquola	30 January 2019	456,000
When the professionalism of McCallum Real Estate is brought into question, Daniel tries to fix their reputation while Emma befriends a pig.
18	2	"Episode 2"	Shaun Wilson	Luke McGregor and Celia Pacquola	30 January 2019	456,000
Emma and Daniel try to prevent a tenant from moving house, after he finds out that the previous owner died in the house and the neighbours are eager to pay their respects. Emma and Daniel come up with a unique fix.
19	3	"Episode 3"	Shaun Wilson	Luke McGregor and Celia Pacquola	6 February 2019	447,000
Can people change, or do they just stay the same? Barbara's sold her house and a visit from her sister, Jenny, leads to some uncharted territory for the McCallums.
20	4	"Episode 4"	Shaun Wilson	Luke McGregor and Celia Pacquola	13 February 2019	429,000
Daniel and Emma are on a drive out of town looking to secure a listing but the day takes a turn as they find themselves getting lost.
21	5	"Episode 5"	Jonathan Brough	Luke McGregor and Celia Pacquola	20 February 2019	408,000
Emma is at home, sick, and feeling very sorry for herself. Grace and Daniel go to check on her, but Daniel keeps his distance - after all, he doesn't want to get sick.
22	6	"Episode 6"	Jonathan Brough	Luke McGregor and Celia Pacquola	27 February 2019	482,000
It's Valentine's Day and Emma is out at Farmer Dan's house. It's an early start and they're off to fix a fence. She's clearly out of place - farm life doesn't come naturally to her, nor is being up this early.
23	7	"Episode 7"	Jonathan Brough	Luke McGregor and Celia Pacquola	6 March 2019	470,000
Daniel and Grace get a new housemate and Emma lands McCallum Real Estate in hot water with a new block of land she is trying to sell.
24	8	"Episode 8"	Jonathan Brough	Luke McGregor and Celia Pacquola	13 March 2019	454,000
Rosehaven are boycotting McCallum Real Estate so Emma and Daniel go into overdrive to try and put things right.

=== Series 4 (2020) ===
No. overall	No. in series	Title	Directed by	Written by	Original release date	Australian viewers
25	1	"Episode 1"	Jonathan Brough	Luke McGregor and Celia Pacquola	8 July 2020	496,000
It's a time of change in Rosehaven, and while Daniel seems to be managing it best, it might be Emma, despite her playful misadventures, who offers the most grown-up advice.
26	2	"Episode 2"	Jonathan Brough	Luke McGregor and Celia Pacquola	15 July 2020	484,000
After spending a lot of time together alone, Daniel and Emma decide to host an audition to add a third member to their dream team.
27	3	"Episode 3"	Jonathan Brough	Luke McGregor and Celia Pacquola	22 July 2020	544,000
Emotions run high in Rosehaven before they realise that all everyone has in common is that they want to be liked. Plus, Emma babysits a rabbit.
28	4	"Episode 4"	Jonathan Brough	Luke McGregor and Celia Pacquola	29 July 2020	468,000
Emma, Daniel and Barbara head to the Regional Realtors Association of Tasmania (RRAT) Conference, where Barbara is hot property among the other agents. Emma sees an opportunity for Daniel to meet someone.
29	5	"Episode 5"	Shaun Wilson	Luke McGregor and Celia Pacquola	5 August 2020	508,000
It's a rare warm and sunny day in Rosehaven, as Daniel discovers there may be some karma involved in rejecting money from an old lady to buy ice-cream.
30	6	"Episode 6"	Shaun Wilson	Luke McGregor and Celia Pacquola	12 August 2020	441,000
Daniel's morning is set into a spin when he discovers a new attractive pharmacist at the chemist while buying ulcer cream. Emma decides that it's time for them to get back out there as they go online to find love.
31	7	"Episode 7"	Shaun Wilson	Luke McGregor and Celia Pacquola	19 August 2020	473,000
Everyone's wishing Emma a happy birthday, but she's not a fan of celebrating. It's work experience week and McCallum Real Estate haven't had any requests, until Gez from the op shop asks if she can learn.
32	8	"Episode 8"	Shaun Wilson	Luke McGregor and Celia Pacquola	26 August 2020	500,000
When a flashy competitor sets his sights on Rosehaven will the locals be enticed by the bells and whistles over the local knowledge of McCallum Real Estate?

=== Series 5 (2021) ===
No. overall	No. in series	Title	Directed by	Written by	Original release date	Australian viewers
33	1	"Episode 1"	Jonathan Brough	Luke McGregor and Celia Pacquola	4 August 2021	330,000
34	2	"Episode 2"	Jonathan Brough	Luke McGregor and Celia Pacquola	11 August 2021	391,000
Emma becomes convinces that her new magic-8 ball will tell her everything she needs to know as Daniel suffers a health scare; meanwhile, the pair try to solve a problem with overbearing landlord, Margaret.
35	3	"Episode 3"	Jonathan Brough	Luke McGregor and Celia Pacquola	18 August 2021	419,000
36	4	"Episode 4"	Jonathan Brough	Luke McGregor and Celia Pacquola	25 August 2021	367,000
37	5	"Episode 5"	Jonathan Brough	Luke McGregor and Celia Pacquola	1 September 2021	413,000
38	6	"Episode 6"	Jonathan Brough	Luke McGregor and Celia Pacquola	8 September 2021	399,000
39	7	"Episode 7"	Jonathan Brough	Luke McGregor and Celia Pacquola	15 September 2021	467,000
40	8	"Episode 8"	Jonathan Brough	Luke McGregor and Celia Pacquola	22 September 2021	422,000
Barbara's retirement isn't going to plan. She's retraining and needs the help of Daniel and Emma.

== Viewership ==
Rosehaven : AUS viewers per episode (thousands)

Season	Episode number							
Season	1	2	3	4	5	6	7	8
1	603	508	457	456	450	517	504	454
2	639	592	598	444	548	553	451	414
3	548	458	452	430	413	474	477	428
4	496	484	544	468	508	441	473	500
5	330	391	419	367	413	399	467	422

Source: Audience measurement performed by OzTam

=== Series 1 (2016) ===
No.	Title	Air date	Overnight ratings		Consolidated ratings		Total viewers	Ref(s)
No.	Title	Air date	Viewers	Rank	Viewers	Rank	Total viewers	Ref(s)
1	Episode 1	12 October 2016	603,000	13	204,000	9	807,000	
2	Episode 2	19 October 2016	508,000	18	239,000	10	747,000	
3	Episode 3	26 October 2016	457,000	—N/a	210,000	13	667,000	
4	Episode 4	2 November 2016	456,000	19	206,000	13	662,000	
5	Episode 5	9 November 2016	450,000	—N/a	165,000	15	615,000	
6	Episode 6	16 November 2016	517,000	16	144,000	11	661,000	
7	Episode 7	23 November 2016	504,000	16	132,000	10	636,000	
8	Episode 8	30 November 2016	454,000	—N/a	135,000	14	589,000	

=== Series 2 (2017) ===
No.	Title	Air date	Overnight ratings		Consolidated ratings		Total viewers	Ref(s)
No.	Title	Air date	Viewers	Rank	Viewers	Rank	Total viewers	Ref(s)
1	Episode 1	25 October 2017	639,000	11	143,000	7	782,000	
2	Episode 2	1 November 2017	592,000	11	147,000	6	739,000	
3	Episode 3	8 November 2017	598,000	10	119,000	10	717,000	
4	Episode 4	15 November 2017	444,000	16	160,000	13	604,000	
5	Episode 5	22 November 2017	548,000	11	104,000	9	652,000	
6	Episode 6	29 November 2017	553,000	12	112,000	9	665,000	
7	Episode 7	6 December 2017	451,000	10	128,000	10	579,000	
8	Episode 8	13 December 2017	414,000	13	122,000	9	536,000	

=== Series 3 (2019) ===
No.	Title	Air date	Overnight ratings		Consolidated ratings		Total viewers	Ref(s)
No.	Title	Air date	Viewers	Rank	Viewers	Rank	Total viewers	Ref(s)
1	Episode 1	30 January 2019	548,000	14	96,000	13	555,000	
2	Episode 2	30 January 2019	458,000	14	96,000	13	555,000	
3	Episode 3	6 February 2019	452,000	17	69,000	14	521,000	
4	Episode 4	13 February 2019	430,000	15	72,000	13	502,000	
5	Episode 5	20 February 2019	413,000	16	81,000	14	494,000	
6	Episode 6	27 February 2019	474,000	13	81,000	13	555,000	
7	Episode 7	6 March 2019	477,000	13	63,000	13	539,000	
8	Episode 8	13 March 2019	428,000	15	60,000	14	488,000	

=== Series 4 (2020) ===
No.	Title	Air date	Overnight ratings		Consolidated ratings		Total viewers	Ref(s)
No.	Title	Air date	Viewers	Rank	Viewers	Rank	Total viewers	Ref(s)
1	Episode 1	8 July 2020	496,000	15	139,000	10	635,000	
2	Episode 2	15 July 2020	484,000	18	96,000	16	580,000	
3	Episode 3	22 July 2020	544,000	17	133,000	12	677,000	
4	Episode 4	29 July 2020	468,000	18	95,000	14	563,000	
5	Episode 5	5 August 2020	508,000	14	71,000	13	579,000	
6	Episode 6	12 August 2020	441,000	15	122,000	13	563,000	
7	Episode 7	19 August 2020	473,000	16	105,000	14	578,000	
8	Episode 8	26 August 2020	500,000	15	102,000	13	602,000	

=== Series 5 (2021) ===
No.	Title	Air date	Overnight ratings		Consolidated ratings		Total viewers	Ref(s)
No.	Title	Air date	Viewers	Rank	Viewers	Rank	Total viewers	Ref(s)
1	Episode 1	4 August 2021	330,000	<20	113,000	19	443,000	
2	Episode 2	11 August 2021	391,000	19	87,000	17	478,000	
3	Episode 3	18 August 2021	419,000	20	101,000	17	520,000	
4	Episode 4	25 August 2021	367,000	<20	134,000	14	501,000	
5	Episode 5	1 September 2021	413,000	18	56,000	15	496,000	
6	Episode 6	8 September 2021	399,000	18	467,000	15	866,000	
7	Episode 7	15 September 2021	467,000	16	472,000	13	939,000	
8	Episode 8	22 September 2021	422,000	16	466,000	14	888,000	

== Broadcast ==
The second season began airing on 25 October 2017. The third season began on 30 January 2019. The fourth season began airing on 8 July 2020. The show was renewed for a fifth and final season in January 2021, which went to air from 4 August 2021.

Internationally, the series was acquired by SundanceTV in the United States.

== Home video releases ==
The first series was released on DVD on 7 December 2016. The second series was released on DVD on 13 December 2017. The third series was released on DVD on 20 March 2019.

== Awards and nominations ==
Year	Award	Category	Recipients and nominees	Result	Refs.
2017	Logie Awards of 2017	Most Outstanding Comedy Program	Rosehaven	Nominated	
2017	7th AACTA Awards	Best Television Comedy Series	Rosehaven	Nominated	
2017	7th AACTA Awards	Best Performance in a Television Comedy	Celia Pacquola	Won	
2017	7th AACTA Awards	Best Screenplay in Television	Celia Pacquola and Luke McGregor (for "Episode 4")	Nominated	
2018	Logie Awards of 2018	Most Popular Actor	Luke McGregor	Nominated	
2018	Logie Awards of 2018	Most Popular Actress	Celia Pacquola	Nominated	
2018	8th AACTA Awards	Best Television Comedy Series	Rosehaven	Nominated	
2018	8th AACTA Awards	Best Performance in a Television Comedy	Celia Pacquola	Nominated	
2019	Logie Awards of 2019	Most Popular Actor	Luke McGregor	Won	
2019	Logie Awards of 2019	Most Popular Actress	Celia Pacquola	Nominated	
2019	Logie Awards of 2019	Most Popular Comedy Program	Rosehaven	Nominated	
2019	9th AACTA Awards	Best Television Comedy Series	Rosehaven	Nominated	
2019	9th AACTA Awards	Best Performance in a Television Comedy	Celia Pacquola	Nominated	
