= Fake (TV series) =

Australian drama thriller television series

- Genre: Drama; Thriller
- Created by: Anya Beyersdorf
- Inspired by: Fake by Stephanie Wood
- Written by: Anya Beyersdorf; Hyun Lee; Jessica Tuckwell
- Directed by: Taylor Ferguson; Emma Freeman; Jennifer Leacey
- Starring: Asher Keddie; David Wenham; Heather Mitchell; Nicholas Brown; Spencer McLaren
- Composers: Cornel Wilczek; Alex Olijnyk
- Country of origin: Australia
- Original language: English
- No. of seasons: 1
- No. of episodes: 8

Production
- Executive producer: Imogen Banks
- Producers: Emelyne Palmer; Asher Keddie
- Production location: Melbourne
- Cinematography: Sky Davies
- Camera setup: Multi-camera
- Running time: 40 minutes
- Production company: Kindling Pictures

Original release
- Network: Paramount+
- Release: 4 July 2024

Fake is an eight-part Australian drama thriller series which debuted on Paramount+ in Australia on 4 July 2024.

== Synopsis ==
Fake is a drama-thriller series. Inspired by the 2019 book with the same name by Stephanie Wood, the series follows a smart magazine writer who thinks she has found her ideal match when she meets a successful grazier on a dating app. The writer later discovers that he is not all that he has led her to believe.

== Production ==
The eight-part 40-minute series was filmed in Melbourne in September 2023, created by screenwriter Anya Beyersdorf and directed by Emma Freeman, Jennifer Leacey and Taylor Ferguson. Three episodes were written by Hyun Lee and Jessica Tuckwell.

The series is produced by Kindling Pictures, led by Imogen Banks and Emelyne Palmer. The series received a major production investment from Paramount ANZ and Screen Australia, in association with VicScreen.

== Cast ==
=== Main ===
- Asher Keddie as Birdie Bell
- David Wenham as Joe Burt

=== Supporting ===
- Janet Andrewartha as Kath Tovey
- Nicholas Brown as Anton
- Anne Charleston as Shirley Burt
- Heather Mitchell as Margeaux
- Ming-Zhu Hii as Kirsty
- Spencer McLaren as Tovey
- Jack Sandle as Connor
- Greg Stone as Peter Van Rotterdam
- Louisa Mignone as Peggy

=== Guests ===
- Arka Das as Rohit
- Freya Stafford as Tessa Rain
- John Stanton as Percy
- Peta Brady as Milena
- Petra Yared as Jessa
- Tony Rickards as Mr Whitney

== Broadcast ==
All episodes of the series were added to Paramount+ on 4 July 2024. The series marked its free-to-air debut on Network 10 and 10Play on 25 May 2025.

== Reception ==
Craig Mathieson of The Age wrote, "On an emotional level it is forensic, and the direction – set up by Emma Freeman – accentuates the acutely felt unease…It becomes a brutal, recurring cue. Fake is one gripping shock to the system after another". Luke Buckmaster of Guardian Australia described the series' narration, "There's a logic to this narration but it's almost impossible to make a sentence like that sound natural – and the show doesn’t quite master the literary qualities it's aspiring for, either". David Knox of TV Tonight wrote, "In a world of scams, bad dates and ghosting Fake is a modern cautionary tale about trust and self-worth. It's also a ripping yarn."

On 25 May 2025, Network 10 aired the show free-to-air and the first episode aired to 300,000 viewers.

== Episodes ==
| No. | Title | Directed by | Written by | Original release date |
|---|---|---|---|---|
| 1 | "Lanolin" | Emma Freeman | Anya Beyersdorf | 4 July 2024 |
| 2 | "Stitches" | Emma Freeman | Anya Beyersdorf | 4 July 2024 |
| 3 | "The Blue Loon" | Jennifer Leacey | Jessica Tuckwell | 4 July 2024 |
| 4 | "Eldorado" | Taylor Ferguson | Hyun Lee | 4 July 2024 |
| 5 | "Love Kitten" | Emma Freeman | Anya Beyersdorf | 4 July 2024 |
| 6 | "Run" | Jennifer Leacey | Jessica Tuckwell | 4 July 2024 |
| 7 | "Liar" | Jennifer Leacey | Anya Beyersdorf | 4 July 2024 |
| 8 | "My Joe" | Jennifer Leacey | Anya Beyersdorf | 4 July 2024 |

== Awards and nominations ==
| Year | Award | Category | Nominee(s) | Result | Ref. |
|---|---|---|---|---|---|
| 2024 | AACTA Awards | Best Drama Series | Fake | Nominated | |
| 2024 | AACTA Awards | Best Lead Actress in Drama | Asher Keddie | Nominated | |
| 2024 | AACTA Awards | Best Supporting Actress in Drama | Heather Mitchell | Nominated | |
| 2024 | AACTA Awards | Best Direction in Drama or Comedy | Emma Freeman – Fake – Episode 5: "Love Kitten" | Nominated | |
| 2024 | AACTA Awards | Best Screenplay in Television | Anya Beyersdorf – Fake – Episode 1: "Lanolin" | Nominated | |
| 2024 | AACTA Awards | Best Casting | Nathan Lloyd – Fake | Nominated | |
| 2025 | AWGIE Awards | Television – Limited Series | Anya Beyersdorf, Jessica Tuckwell, and Hyun Lee | Won | |
