= Would I Lie to You? (Australian game show) =

- Also known as: Would I Lie to You? Australia
- Genre: Game show
- Based on: Would I Lie to You? by Peter Holmes
- Presented by: Chrissie Swan
- Starring: Chris Taylor; Frank Woodley; Charlie Pickering
- Country of origin: Australia
- Original language: English
- No. of series: 2
- No. of episodes: 16

Production
- Production locations: Melbourne, Victoria, Australia
- Camera setup: Multi-camera
- Running time: 60 minutes
- Production company: Endemol Shine Australia

Original release
- Network: Network 10
- Release: 28 February 2022 – 10 April 2023

Would I Lie to You? (informally abbreviated as WILTY; also known as Would I Lie to You? Australia) is an Australian comedy panel game show based on the British game show of the same name. It premiered on Network 10 on 28 February 2022. In September 2022, it was announced that the show had been renewed for a second series which would premiere in 2023, with Charlie Pickering replacing comedian Chris Taylor as a regular team captain.

At their 2024 Upfronts, Channel 10 announced that the show would not be returning in 2024.

== Format ==
=== Rounds ===
In all rounds, the scoring system is the same: teams gain a point for correctly guessing whether a statement is true or not, but if they guess incorrectly the opposing team gets a point. Some questions are edited out during post-production, however the scores were re-recorded to reflect only the questions which had made the edit and not the whole recording.

==== Current rounds ====
- "Home Truths": Panellists read out a statement from a card about themselves. The opposing team has to decide whether it is true or false by asking the panellist questions.
- "This is My...": A guest comes onto the set and is introduced by first name, but remains standing in silence as the round continues. Panellists on one team tell the opposing team about their relationship to the guest; only one account out of three told is genuine, and the opposing team has to work out which it is. At the end of the round, the guest reveals their true identity, and which of the panellists they have a genuine relationship with.
- "Quick-Fire Lies": Panellists are chosen at random, and read a statement about themselves from a card. This is identical to "Home Truths" in practice.
- "Could it Be?": Chrissie reads out a statement for each team and they have determine whether it is a truth or a lie.

==== Former rounds ====
- "Possession": Panellists take an item out of a box and read a statement from a card, and have to convince the opposing team that the possession genuinely belongs to them.

== Cast ==
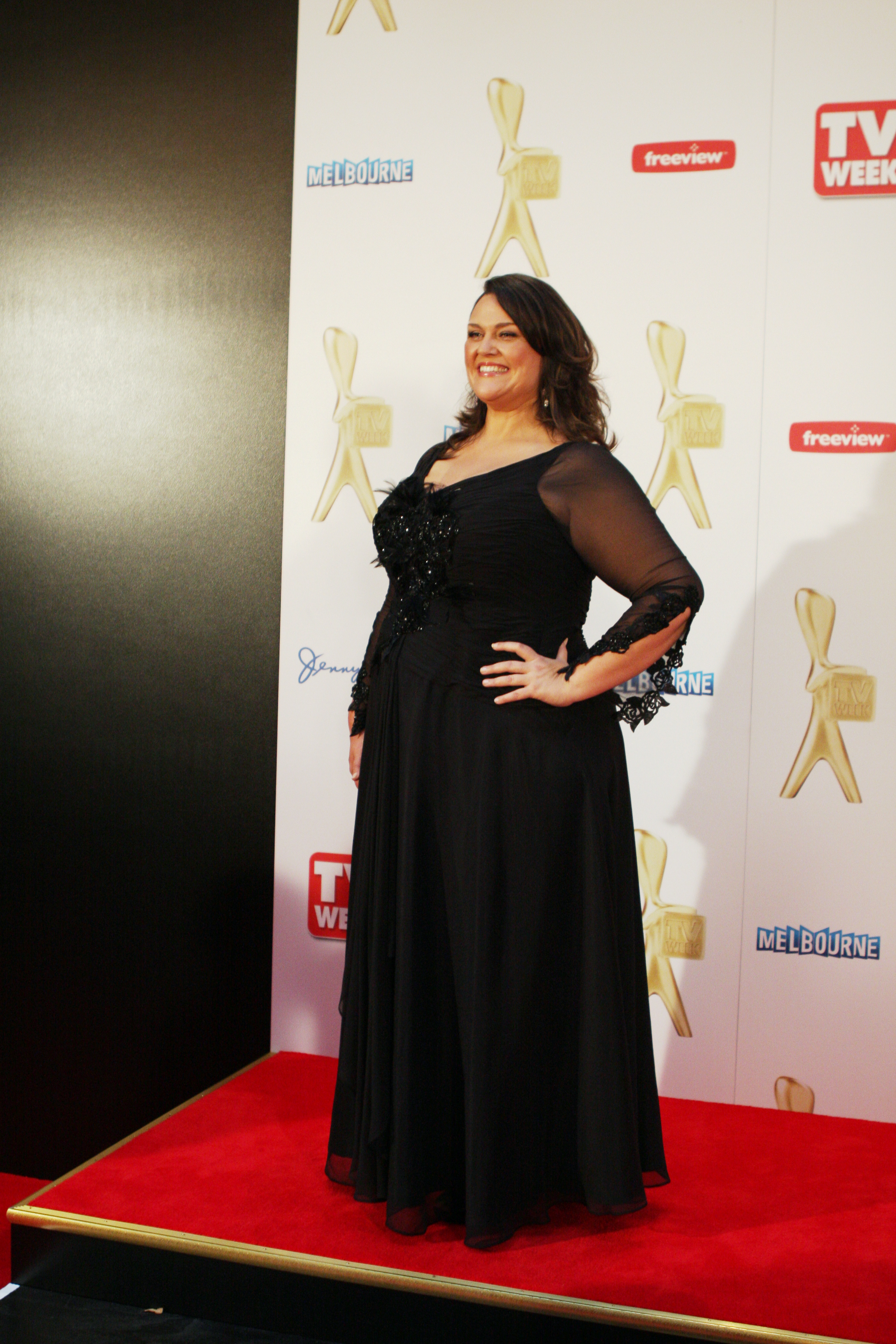
Television and radio personality Chrissie Swan hosts.

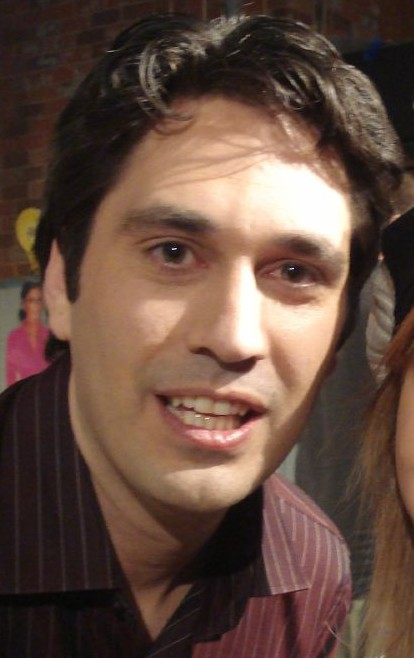
Comedian Chris Taylor was a regular team captain in the first series.

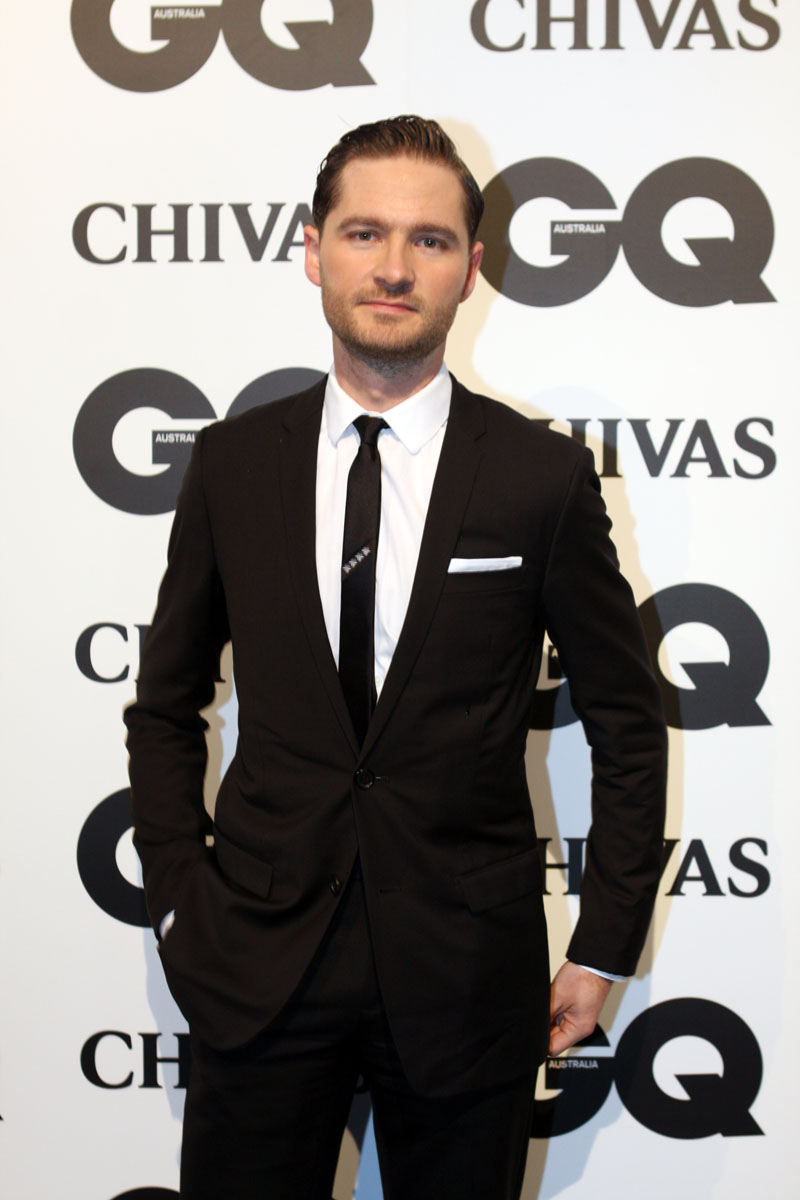
Comedian Charlie Pickering has been a regular team captain from series 2 onwards.

Comedian Frank Woodley is also a regular team captain and has appeared in every episode.

=== Guest appearances ===
The following have all appeared multiple times as one of the guest panellists on the show.

3 appearances

- Lloyd Langford

2 appearances

- Dave Hughes
- Luke McGregor
- Ross Noble
- Cal Wilson

== Episodes ==
The coloured backgrounds denote the result of each of the shows or series:

– indicates Chris' or Charlie's team won the game or the series.
– indicates Frank's team won the game or the series.
– indicates the game or the series ended in a draw.
Bold type – indicates Chrissie's individual liar of the week. (Note: An individual liar of the week was not announced in Series 2.)

=== Series overview ===
| Series | Episodes | Originally released | |
| Series | Episodes | First released | Last released |
|---|---|---|---|
| 1 | 8 | 28 February 2022 | 18 April 2022 |
| 2 | 8 | 13 February 2023 | 10 April 2023 |

=== Series 1 (2022) ===
| Episode | Recording date | First broadcast | Chris' team | Frank's team | Guest | Scores (Note: Scores were not announced in the episode, Chrissie Swan simply announces the winning team.) | Viewers |
|---|---|---|---|---|---|---|---|
| 1 | December 2021 | 28 February 2022 | **Ross Noble** & Carrie Bickmore | Luke McGregor & Zoë Coombs Marr | Vanessa (Frank's team) | 6–3 | 482,000 |
| 2 | December 2021 | 7 March 2022 | Melissa Leong & **Dave Hughes** | Lloyd Langford & Abbie Chatfield | Jack (Chris' Team) | 3–5 | 343,000 |
| 3 | 14 December 2021 | 14 March 2022 | Carl Cox & Cal Wilson | **Charlie Pickering** & Michala Banas | Ange (Frank's team) | 3–5 | 316,000 |
| 4 | December 2021 | 21 March 2022 | Matt Okine & **Denise Scott** | Stephen Curry & Ella Hooper | Lizzy (Frank's team) | 5–3 | 322,000 |
| 5 | December 2021 | 28 March 2022 | **Lloyd Langford** & Gina Liano | Daniel MacPherson & Claire Hooper | Liam (Frank's team) | 3–6 | 294,000 |
| 6 | 13 December 2021 | 4 April 2022 | **Celia Pacquola** & Mark Humphries | Art Simone & Dave Thornton | Joy (Chris' team) | 4–5 | 243,000 |
| 7 | December 2021 | 11 April 2022 | Dr Susan Carland & Rhys Nicholson | **Pia Miranda** & Dane Simpson | Tony (Chris' team) | 6–5 | 303,000 |
| 8 | 20 December 2021 | 18 April 2022 | Nick Cody & **Annie Maynard** | Jimmy Rees & Casey Donovan | Max (Chris' team) | 6–2 | 242,000 |

=== Series 2 (2023) ===
| Episode | Recording date | First broadcast | Charlie's team | Frank's team | Guest | Scores | Viewers |
|---|---|---|---|---|---|---|---|
| 1 | 18 October 2022 | 13 February 2023 | Rebecca Gibney & Luke McGregor | Harley Breen & Concetta Caristo | Paul (Frank's team) | 2–7 | 229,000 |
| 2 | 20 October 2022 | 20 February 2023 | Dave Hughes & Nina Oyama | Joel Creasey & Jacqui Lambie | Stavros (Frank's team) | 6–4 | 233,000 |
| 3 | 24 October 2022 | 27 February 2023 | Ross Noble & Bev Killick | Chris Brown & Alex Lee | Fiona (Charlie's team) | 4–4 | 217,000 |
| 4 | 24 October 2022 | 6 March 2023 | Em Rusciano & Christopher Pyne | Mel Buttle & Josh Lawson | Carl (Charlie's team) | 3–6 | 256,000 |
| 5 | 28 October 2022 | 13 March 2023 | Peter Rowsthorn & Geraldine Hickey | Tommy Little & Myf Warhurst | Morag (Charlie's team) | 3–7 | 232,000 |
| 6 | 26 October 2022 | 20 March 2023 | Nath Valvo & Steph Tisdell | Courtney Act & Peter Helliar | Christine (Charlie's team) | 3–6 | 233,000 |
| 7 | 26 October 2022 | 3 April 2023 | Dilruk Jayasinha & Georgie Carroll | Jock Zonfrillo & Cal Wilson | Halle (Charlie's team) | 4–5 | 258,000 |
| 8 | 28 October 2022 | 10 April 2023 | Tanya Hennessy & Lloyd Langford | Julie Goodwin & Broden Kelly | Malcolm (Frank's team) | 8–2 | 205,000 |

=== Scores ===
| Chris/Charlie | Frank |
|---|---|
**Series wins** (1 drawn)
| 0 | 1 |
**Episode wins** (2 drawn)
| 6 | 8 |

== See also ==
- Would I Lie to You?
- Would You Believe?
- To Tell the Truth
