= Legally Brown =

- Genre: Comedy
- Presented by: Nazeem Hussain
- Country of origin: Australia
- Original language: English
- No. of seasons: 2
- No. of episodes: 20

Production
- Running time: ~ 25 minutes

Original release
- Network: SBS
- Release: 16 September 2013 – 13 October 2014

Legally Brown was an Australian comedy television series screened on SBS from 2013 to 2014. It presented a take on being Muslim in Australia.

The ten-part series was hosted and co-written by Nazeem Hussain and produced by Johnny Lowry. It featured stand-up in front of a live studio audience, with pre-recorded scripted sketches and character and hidden camera stunts.

== Cast ==
- Nazeem Hussain as himself, Imran Farook and other roles
- Mohammed El-Leissy as Mohamed
- Alice Ansara as Lamees and other roles
- Luke McGregor
- Matt Okine
- Laura Hughes as Maymoona and other roles
- Ronny Chieng
- Anthony Salame as Aziz
