= Luke McGregor =

Australian comedian, writer and actor (born 1983)

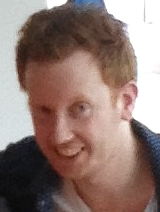
- McGregor in 2013
- Born: Luke William McGregor; 2 October 1983 (age 42); Hobart, Tasmania, Australia
- Education: University of Tasmania
- Occupations: Comedian, writer, actor
- Years active: 2007–present
- Spouse: Amy Thunig (m. 2023)

Luke William McGregor is an Australian comedian, writer and actor, who has performed at various national and international comedy festivals, as himself in many TV shows, and is known for his roles in the ABC TV series Utopia and Rosehaven.

== Early career and education ==
McGregor grew up in Hobart, Tasmania, and attended Dominic College and the University of Tasmania, where he spent seven years studying law, philosophy, teaching, physics, with an eye to studying medicine, finally graduating with a combined Bachelor of Arts and Bachelor of Economics degree. After graduation, McGregor worked for Centrelink and Medicare, amongst other jobs.

Aged 25, he went along to a comedy gig with a friend and got up on stage and spoke for about five minutes. Other comedians encouraged him to continue.

In 2008 he launched his comedy career, and was a national finalist in Raw Comedy.

== Career ==
McGregor was a cast member on the RMITV flagship production Studio A until its final season in 2011.

In 2014, McGregor appeared as a guest on Dirty Laundry Live.

He first performed at the Melbourne International Comedy Festival in 2013, winning Best Newcomer for his show My Soulmate is Out of My League. A review of the show appeared in the Herald Sun which gave the show a four-star rating. He has also performed at the Edinburgh Festival Fringe.

He appeared in ABC TV comedy series It's a Date in 2013–2014, followed by The Time of Our Lives (2013), Legally Brown and the first two seasons of Utopia (2014–2015).

In 2016 he collaborated with Celia Pacquola to write and star in the series Rosehaven.

His six-part comedy documentary series Luke Warm Sex, a show on sexuality and body image, aired on the ABC from March 2016.

In February 2023, McGregor appeared as a contestant on the first season of Network 10's Taskmaster Australia. Later that year, he appeared on Thank God You're Here alongside Fifi Box.

In May 2024, McGregor was announced to be competing on the forthcoming eighth season of Network 10's The Amazing Race Australia, alongside his mum Julie. They were the first team to be eliminated. He was a guest on Guy Montgomery's Guy Mont-Spelling Bee in 2024.

In 2025, he appeared as a guest announcer on Sam Pang Tonight.

== Filmography ==
=== Television ===
Year	Title	Role	Notes	Ref
2026	Gnomes	TBA	TV series	
2016–21	Rosehaven	Daniel McCallum	Co-star and Co-writer 40 episodes	
2020	Moments of Clarity	Ian	7 episodes	
2017-18	True Story with Hamish & Andy	Nathan / Records Official	2 episodes	
2015	Fresh Blood Pilot Season	Luke	1 episode	
2014	Fancy Boy	Geoff / Client	2 episodes	
2014	Noirhouse	Courier	1 episode	
2014–15	Utopia	Hugh	Season 1 and 2 16 episodes	
2013-15	Please Like Me	Rental Agent	2 episodes	
2013–14	The Time Of Our Lives	Luke	3 episodes	
2013–14	Legally Brown			
2013	It's a Date	Kevin	1 episode	
2012	You're Skitting Me!	Terry	1 episode	

=== Self appearances ===
Year	Title	Role	Notes	Ref
2008	Raw Comedy	Himself	Finalist	
2008–11	Studio A	Himself		
2014	Dirty Laundry Live	Himself	Guest	
2015	Have You Been Paying Attention?	Himself	9 episodes	
2016	Luke Warm Sex	Himself	Writer, host	
2018–2019	Hughesy, We Have a Problem	Himself	4 episodes	
2019	Show Me the Movie!	Himself	1 episode	
2019	Talkin' 'Bout Your Generation	Himself	1 episode	
2019	Saturday Night Rove	Himself	1 episode	
2019	Celebrity Name Game	Himself	1 episode	
2019	The Masked Singer Australia	Himself	Guest judge	
2020	The Weekly with Charlie Pickering	Himself	Regular contributor	
2020	Spicks and Specks 2010's Special	Himself	1 episode	
2022-23	Would I Lie to You? Australia	Himself	2 episodes	
2022-23	The Hundred with Andy Lee	Himself	5 episodes	
2023	Taskmaster Australia	Himself	Competitor, series 1	
2023	Patriot Brains	Himself	Series 2, episode 2	
2024	Guy Montgomery's Guy Mont-Spelling Bee	Himself	Season 1, episode 5	
2024	The Amazing Race Australia	Himself	Season 8/Celebrity Edition Contestant, with his mum	
2025	Sam Pang Tonight	Himself	Guest announcer; Season 1, episode 7	

=== Film ===
Year	Title	Role	Notes
2010	Four Minute Warning	Barry	Short
2011	The Problematic World of You	Jeremy	Short
2012	Scumbus	Carl	
2013	Rob Hunter: Special Detective	Joel	Video
2014	Milk and Cookies	Terry the Postman	Short
2015	Now Add Honey	Charles	
2015	Border Protection Squad	Michael Luciano	
2018	Oliver Clark: Making Muffins	Cat	Video
2023	The Emu War		

Production Credits
Year	Title	Role	Notes
2023	To The Death	Exec Producer	Short
2016-2021	Rosehaven	Producer/Writer	40 episodes
2020	The Weekly with Charlie Pickering	Writer	7 episodes
2016	Luke Warm Sex	Writer	6 episodes
2014	It's a Date	Writer	1 episode

== Awards ==
- Best Newcomer, Melbourne International Comedy Festival, 2013
- Best Newcomer, Sydney Comedy Festival, 2014
- Best Comedy Script, AWGIE Awards, 2017, for Rosehaven co-written with Celia Pacquola.
- Logie Award for Most Popular Actor, 2019, for Rosehaven
