= The Unusual Suspects (miniseries) =

Australian comedy-drama TV series

- Genre: Comedy drama
- Created by: Jessica Redenbach
- Written by: Jessica Redenbach; Roger Monk; Vonne Patiag
- Directed by: Natalie Bailey; Melvin Montalban
- Starring: Aina Dumlao; Miranda Otto; Michelle Vergara Moore; Heather Mitchell; Susana Downes
- Composer: Chiara Costanza with Clinton McKinnon
- Country of origin: Australia
- Original languages: English; Tagalog
- No. of series: 1
- No. of episodes: 4

Production
- Producers: Angie Fielder; Polly Staniford
- Cinematography: Simon Ozolins
- Camera setup: Multi-camera
- Running time: 54 minutes
- Production company: Aquarius Films

Original release
- Network: SBS
- Release: 3 June 2021 – present

The Unusual Suspects is an Australian comedy-drama television series screened on SBS TV from 3 June 2021. The four-part miniseries is directed by Natalie Bailey and Melvin Montalban and produced by Angie Fielder and Polly Staniford. It is written by Jessica Redenbach, Roger Monk and Vonne Patiag, with Margarett Cortez as script consultant. The series is primarily in English, with some parts in Tagalog.

== Synopsis ==
A multi-million-dollar necklace is stolen from the home of self-made Filipina businesswoman Roxanne Waters during her twins' extravagant birthday party in Sydney's glamorous Eastern Suburbs. The ensuing police investigation threatens to expose cracks in Vaucluse's sparkling façade, shedding a light on hidden rivalries, shady business deals and forbidden affairs. Everyone is under suspicion, from social darling Sara Beasley, whose perfect life is crumbling fast, to her long-suffering nanny, Evie De La Rosa, a godmother of sorts for other Filipino domestic workers.

== Cast ==
- Miranda Otto as Sara Beasley
- Aina Dumlao as Evie De La Rosa
- Michelle Vergara Moore as Roxanne Waters
- Peter O'Brien as Nick Parker-Smith
- Matt Day as Garth Beasley
- Toby Leonard Moore as Jordan Waters
- Lena Cruz as Amy
- Susana Downes as Gigi
- Ari Boyland as Dean
- Heather Mitchell as Birdie
- James Lugton as Detective Andrew Moran
- Renee Lim as Detective Claudia Lin
- Susie Porter as Rae
- Sandy Gore as Jeannie
- Megan Smart as Paloma
- Andrea Demetriades as Martha Drewe
- Blake Santos as Joshua Waters
- Avery Santos as Rory Waters
- Darcey O’Brien as Charlie
- Emma Cleland as Maxi Beasley
- Liam Cleland as Ollie Beasley
- Miguel Castro as Modesto
- Danielle David as Melanie

== Episodes ==
No.	Title	Directed by	Written by	Original release date	Australian viewers
1	"Shine On You Crazy Diamond"	Natalie Bailey	Jessica Redenbach	June 3, 2021	150,000
2	"Down To Zero"	Melvin J. Montalban	Jessica Redenbach	June 10, 2021	102,000
3	"The Edge Of Glory"	Natalie Bailey	Jessica Redenbach	June 17, 2021	88,000
4	"Bitch Better Have My Money"	Natalie Bailey	Roger Monk	June 24, 2021	74,000
