= Luke Warm Sex =

Australian comedy documentary television series

Luke Warm Sex is a six-part Australian television comedy documentary series starring Melbourne comedian Luke McGregor, about body image and sexuality. It first screened on Wednesday 16 March 2016 at 9 p.m. on the ABC.

== Overview ==
Luke McGregor takes on a new challenge of improving his sex life with the help of therapists, sex coaches and scientists.

=== Episodes ===
- Episode 1: "Fear of Being Nude"
- Episode 2: "Comfortable with Contact"
- Episode 3: "How Do I Prepare My Body for Sex?"
- Episode 4: "It's a Pleasure to Meet You"
- Episode 5: "Getting Intimate with Intimacy"
- Episode 6: "Spicing Up Our Sex Lives"

== Reception ==
In a positive review, Greta Parry of Metro Magazine called the show an "informative, accessible overview of healthy sexuality [that] is a crucial stepping stone on the way to a more enlightened, tolerant Australia"" The Guardian television critic Luke Buckmaster found the show to be "lukewarm", a "bland milk-and-water pseudo sex-ed doco that feels like it was co-written by Healthy Harold and the 40-Year-Old Virgin".
