= Katherine Hicks =

Australian actress

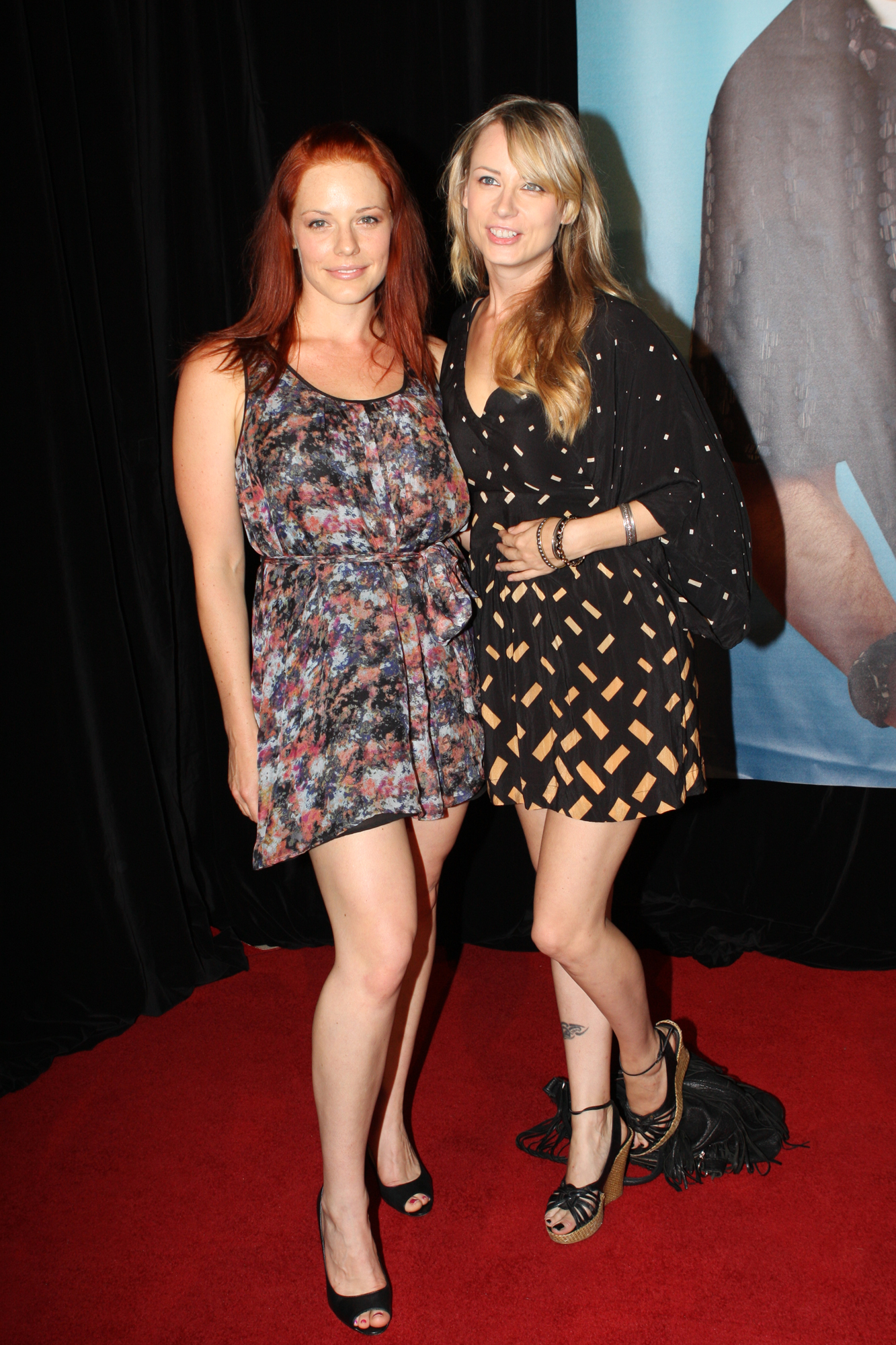
- Hicks (left) at the premiere of Hall Pass in 2011.
- Born: Katherine Hicks; September 16, 1977 (age 49); Melbourne, Victoria, Australia
- Occupation: Actress

Katherine Hicks is an Australian actress. She is known for her roles as Heidi Wilson on Rescue: Special Ops and Sam MacKenzie on Winners & Losers.

== Early life ==
Hicks was born in Melbourne, Victoria, and grew up on a farm in Byron Bay, New South Wales. She first appeared on stage at Lismore’s Rochdale Theatre at the age of four. She set her sights on acting as a career after appearing in a production of Marat/Sade at Trinity Catholic College in Lismore. After completing her HSC at Byron Bay High School, Hicks moved to Sydney at the age of 17, to undertake her first television role in Heartbreak High. She then relocated to Melbourne to study at VCA, which she graduated from in 2007 with a Bachelor Degree in Acting. After completing her studies, Hicks toured with Bell Shakespeare "Actors at Work" program for a year.

== Career ==
=== Television ===
Hicks' first television role was as Tess in the final season of Heartbreak High (1999). She credits her time working on the show with making her take acting more seriously, due to the ABC providing young actors with plenty of acting, voice and movement tuition.

From 2008 to 2009, she played a regular role as Poppy in the Out of the Blue. She then starred as Heidi Wilson in Rescue: Special Ops (2009–11) which saw her nominated for a Logie Award for Most Popular New Female Talent in 2010.

Hicks played a lead role in the miniseries The Strange Calls in 2012. The same year, she landed her breakthrough role in Winners & Losers playing the character of Sam MacKenzie, for which she won an ASTRA Award for Most Outstanding Performance by a Female Actor. From 2016 to 2017, she appeared in a variety of guest roles, including Jack Irish and Offspring.

=== Film ===
In 2012, Hicks had a starring role as Angie in feature film Black & White & Sex and appeared in the TV movie Devil's Dust as Janice. She played Lorna in the short film L.O.V.E. Insurance for the Heart – a 2013 Tropfest finalist. She also starred as Jane in 2015 feature film Terminus.

=== Stage ===
Hicks also has a variety of stage credits to her name, including as writer and director. She currently resides in Los Angeles, and has added stand-up comedy to her resumé.

== Filmography ==
=== Film ===
Year	Title	Role	Type
2009	Nightwalking	Voices	Short film
2009	Il Matchmaker	Lani	Short film
2009	Lonely	Jade	Short film
2011	Black & White & Sex	Angie 1	Feature film
2013	Anima	Anistasia Sokalov	Short film
2013	L.O.V.E. Insurance for the Heart	Lorna	Short film
2015	Mad Max: Fury Road	Glory	Feature film
2015	Terminus	Jane Chamberlain	Feature film

=== Television ===
Year	Title	Role	Type
1999	Heartbreak High	Tess Mason	Season 7, 14 episodes
2008–2009	Out of the Blue	Poppy Hammond	120 episodes
2009	John Safran’s Race Relations	Self	1 episode
2009–2011	Rescue: Special Ops	Heidi Wilson	48 episodes
2012	Devil's Dust	Janis Banton	Miniseries, 2 episodes
2012	The Strange Calls	Kath	Miniseries, 6 episodes
2012–2015	Winners & Losers	Sam MacKenzie	Seasons 2–4, 55 episodes
2016	Jack Irish	Donna Donovic	1 episode
2016	Offspring	Mandy Rao	1 episode
2017	Newton’s Law	Tracey Dingwell	Miniseries, 1 episode
2017	The Leftovers	TSA Agent	1 episode

== Theatre ==
Year	Title	Role	Type
	Macbeth	Lady Macbeth	Bell Shakespeare
	The Three Sisters	Natasha	VCA Theatre
	Hamlet	Claudius	VCA Theatre
	Fefu and Her Friends		
	The Art of Success		
	Smiles of a Summer Night	Desiree	VCA Theatre
	Something She Had to Tell		
	Yes		
2005	Dirtgirlz	Shazza	BlackBox, Melbourne with Loose Eye Media and Short+Sweet
2006	Sugar Mountain		Cinema Nova, Melbourne
2007	After the End	Louise	New Theatre, Sydney
2007	Art is a Weapon	Florence	New Theatre, Sydney
2009	Fake Porno	Tina Nina	Ride on Theatre

== Awards and nominations ==
Year	Nominated work	Award	Category	Result
2010	Rescue: Special Ops	Logie Awards	Most Popular New Female Talent	Nominated
2011	Rescue: Special Ops	IF Awards	Out of the Box Actor in Television Award	Nominated
2013	Katherine Hicks	Logie Awards	Most Popular Actress	Nominated
2014	Katherine Hicks	Logie Awards	Most Popular Actress	Nominated
2014	Winners & Losers	Equity Ensemble Awards	Outstanding Performance by an Ensemble in a Drama Series	Nominated
2014	Winners & Losers	ASTRA Awards	Most Outstanding Performance by a Female Actor	Won
2015	Katherine Hicks	Logie Awards	Most Popular Actress	Nominated
