= The Other Guy (TV series) =

Australian comedy TV series

- Genre: Comedy drama
- Created by: Matt Okine
- Written by: Matt Okine; Becky Lucas; Kacie Anning (series 2); Tristram Baumber (series 2 additional writing)
- Directed by: Kacie Anning (series 1); Gracie Otto (series 2)
- Starring: Matt Okine; Valene Kane; Harriet Dyer; Michael Hing; Michael-Anthony Taylor; Christiaan Van Vuuren; Luke Ford
- Country of origin: Australia
- Original language: English
- No. of series: 2
- No. of episodes: 12

Production
- Executive producers: Jude Troy; Troy Lum; Nick Forward; Rob Gibson; Matt Okine; Justine Flynn
- Producers: Angie Fielder; Polly Staniford; Cecilia Ritchie
- Running time: 30 Minutes
- Production companies: Aquarius Films, Wooden Horse

Original release
- Network: Stan
- Release: 17 August 2017

The Other Guy is an Australian comedy drama television series on the streaming service Stan. The series is written by and stars comedian Matt Okine. A second season was released on 13 December 2019.

== Synopsis ==
The series is about a successful radio host who finds himself unexpectedly back in the dating pool for the first time in a decade, after discovering his long-term girlfriend has been having an affair with his best friend.

== Cast ==
=== Main / regular ===
- Matt Okine as AJ Amon
- Valene Kane as Olivia Collins
- Harriet Dyer as Stevie Nicholls
- Michael Hing as Sam Wu
- Michael-Anthony Taylor as Daddy Mack
- Christiaan Van Vuuren as Derek aka Dezzy
- Luke Ford as Henry
- Lily Sullivan as Charlie
- Claudia Karvan as Miranda

=== Guests ===
- Barry Otto as Ron
- Ling-Hsueh Tang as Sam's Mum
- Mercia Deane-Johns as Bev / Cashier
- Rahel Romahn as Paul Perry
- Susan Prior as Sharon
- Erin McNaught as Gemma Hoffs
- Clementine Ford as Director

== Production ==
The series was produced by Aquarius Films in association with Wooden Horse.

== Episodes ==
=== Series overview ===
Series	Episodes	Originally released
1	6	17 August 2017
2	6	13 December 2019

=== Season 1 (2017) ===
No. overall	No. in season	Title	Directed by	Written by	Original release date
1	1	"The Mattress"	Kacie Anning	Matt Okine & Becky Lucas	17 August 2017
2	2	"Strangers"	Kacie Anning	Matt Okine & Becky Lucas	17 August 2017
3	3	"Mother's Day"	Kacie Anning	Matt Okine & Becky Lucas	17 August 2017
4	4	"The Dots"	Kacie Anning	Matt Okine & Becky Lucas	17 August 2017
5	5	"Sri Lanka"	Kacie Anning	Matt Okine & Becky Lucas	17 August 2017
6	6	"Dog Murphy"	Kacie Anning	Matt Okine & Becky Lucas	17 August 2017

=== Season 2 (2019) ===
No. overall	No. in season	Title	Directed by	Written by	Original release date
7	1	"Fake Dicks and Caravans"	Gracie Otto	Matt Okine and Becky Lewis	13 December 2019
8	2	"The Escape Room"	Gracie Otto	Kacie Anning	13 December 2019
9	3	"Headlice and Hospitals"	Gracie Otto	Kacie Anning	13 December 2019
10	4	"The Hucks"	Gracie Otto	Matt Okine	13 December 2019
11	5	"New Wheels and Cock Socks"	Gracie Otto	Kacie Anning	13 December 2019
12	6	"The Final Test"	Gracie Otto	Matt Okine	13 December 2019
