= Brian Viner =

English journalist and author

Brian Viner (born 25 October 1961) is an English journalist and author.

Viner was born to an unmarried mother at the now demolished Royal Northern Hospital, London, and was adopted by a couple in Southport, Merseyside when a few weeks old. He met his birth parents for the first time in the 1990s.

He was educated at King George V School, Southport, then at the University of St Andrews. In 1985/6 he was a Robert T. Jones Scholar at Emory University in Atlanta, Georgia.

From 1994 to 1999 Viner wrote for the Mail on Sunday. In 1997 he won a What the Papers Say Award for his work as the paper's television critic. He was a columnist on The Independent from January 1999 to December 2011, and then turned freelance, writing for numerous national newspapers, including the Daily Mail, The Mail on Sunday, the Financial Times, The Sunday Telegraph, The Sunday Times, The Independent, The Guardian, the Daily Mirror and the Sunday Express.

At The Independent, he was principally a sports writer, and "The Brian Viner Interview" with a well-known sporting figure became the longest-running weekly interview in British newspaper journalism. He has been shortlisted multiple times as Interviewer of the Year in the British Press Awards and the Sports Journalism Awards. In October 2013, Viner became film critic of the Daily Mail, succeeding Christopher Tookey.

He is the author of seven books, all non-fiction. Viner's most recently published book, Looking For The Toffees, is an account of his teen years following Everton FC, in which he goes in search of his childhood heroes. Prior to that, he wrote The Good, The Dad and The Ugly: The Trials of Fatherhood, published in May 2013. Of his earlier books, Tales of the Country and its sequel The Pheasants' Revolt recount the story of his, and his family's, move from London to Herefordshire. Ali, Pele, Lillee & Me: A Personal Odyssey Through the Sporting Seventies recalls his childhood as a sports enthusiast, and Nice To See It, To See It Nice: The Seventies in Front of the Telly is similarly a memoir, but about television. His book Cream Teas, Traffic Jams and Sunburn: The Great British Holiday was voted Travel Book of the Year in The 2011 British Travel Press Awards. In 2010 Tales of the Country was adapted for the stage by the Pentabus Theatre Company.

He is married to the novelist Jane Sanderson; the couple have three children.
