= Michelle Vergara Moore =

Australian actress

- Born: Victoria, Australia
- Education: National Institute of Dramatic Art (BFA)
- Occupation: Actor
- Spouse: Toby Leonard Moore (m. 2019)
- Children: 1

Photographer: Leslie Hasler

Michelle Vergara Moore is an Australian actress, best known for her roles as Ella/Lily in the NBC TV series La Brea, Roxanne Waters in the Special Broadcasting Service television series The Unusual Suspects, Chai Li Tivoli in The Time Of Our Lives, Carla Tizon in Condor, and Angie 5 in Black & White & Sex.

== Early life ==
Michelle was born in country Victoria, the sixth of ten children. Growing up in the western suburbs of Melbourne, she was offered a place to study acting at both the Western Australian Academy of Performing Arts (WAAPA) and the National Institute of Dramatic Art (NIDA). Completing the Bachelor of Dramatic Art in Acting, she graduated from the NIDA, where she met her future husband.

== Acting career ==
Michelle made her first US screen appearance in the crime-thriller film Side Effects, directed by Steven Soderbergh. Other American credits include a series regular role on the NBC series La Brea and a recurring role opposite Bob Balaban in the spy thriller series Condor. She also made a guest appearance playing an Australian ex-model, Gemma, in High Maintenance on HBO.

Michelle starred in the Australian independent film Black & White & Sex, which premiered at the Sydney Film Festival with its international premiere at the 41st International Film Festival Rotterdam.

Michelle was one of the first actors of Asian origin to play a lead series regular role in an Australian television show, in two seasons of The Time of Our Lives, which was nominated for a Logie Award for Most Outstanding Drama Series.

In 2021, Michelle starred as Roxanne Waters alongside Miranda Otto and Susie Porter in The Unusual Suspects. In a case of art imitating life, in The Unusual Suspects, she acts opposite her husband Toby Leonard Moore, who plays the character's husband, Jordan Waters. All episodes are streaming on Hulu and SBS On Demand. Also in 2021, Michelle was a recurring guest star in two TV series; as CIA Agent, Carla Tizon, on season 2 of Condor airing on Epix and in season 1 of the NBC series La Brea. Michelle was upped to a series regular cast member on La Brea for season 2.

== Filmography ==
=== Film ===
Year	Title	Role	Notes
2009	Two of a Kind	Amy	Feature film
2011	Black & White & Sex	Angie 5	Film
2011	Story Keeper	Amy	
2012	Fish and Chips	Kat	Short film
2012	True Dead	Albeentha	Short film
2013	Side Effects	Joan	Feature film
2013	95 Decibels	Keiko	Short film

=== Television ===
Year	Title	Role	Notes
2004	Wicked Science	Miss Buckingham	1 episode
2009	All Saints	Woman	1 episode
2010	Neighbours	Lynda Solloway	1 episode
2013–14	The Time of Our Lives	Chai Li Tivolli	21 episodes
2020	High Maintenance	Gemma	1 episode
2020	Condor	Carla Tizon	Season 2, 5 episodes
2021	The Unusual Suspects	Roxanne Waters	4 episodes
2021–23	La Brea	Ella Jones	Seasons 1–2, 15 episodes

== Personal life ==
Moore is a dual U.S./Australian citizen and resides in New York City with her husband, fellow Australian actor, Toby Leonard Moore.
