= Celia Pacquola =

Australian comedian and actress (born 1983)

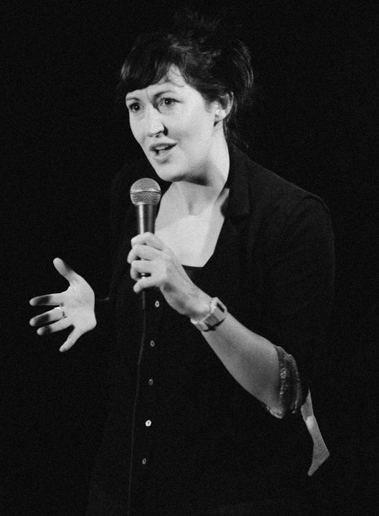
- Pacquola in 2013
- Born: 12 February 1983 (age 43); Yarra Glen, Victoria, Australia
- Occupations: Comedian; actress; writer; presenter
- Years active: 2006–present
- Partner: Dara Munnis
- Children: 1
- Website: Official website

Celia Pacquola (born 12 February 1983) is an Australian comedian, writer, presenter, and actress who performs predominantly in Australia and the United Kingdom.

== Early life ==
Pacquola is a third child with two older sisters. She grew up in Christmas Hills, Victoria, with her parents separating when she was 18.

She is a descendant of the Australian administrator and artist John Rae.

== Career ==
Pacquola began doing stand-up comedy in 2006.

=== Radio ===
Pacquola has written and appeared on Australian and British radio, presenting Red Hot Go and Fox Summer Breakfast on Fox FM and The Comedy Hour on ABC Radio. She has written for and appeared on BBC Radio 4 shows, including Shappi Talk, What's So Funny?, It's Your Round, The Headset, The Unbelievable Truth, and Britain Versus the World.

=== Television ===
Pacquola has written for and performed in Good News Week and Laid. She appeared in and co-wrote the first episode of the second season of It's a Date. She has made acting appearances in ABC TV series Utopia as well as The Beautiful Lie, winning an AACTA Award for "best guest or supporting actress in a television drama". In 2016, she and Luke McGregor wrote and performed in Rosehaven. Rosehaven won the 2017 AWGIE Award for Best Comedy script.

In 2020, Pacquola won the seventeenth season of Dancing with the Stars Australia and received A$50,000 for her charity, the Safe Steps Family Violence and Support Centre.

Other shows she has performed in, both in Australia and the UK, include Rove, The Project, Sleuth 101, Celebrity Name Game, Talkin' 'Bout Your Generation, The Hundred with Andy Lee, Would I Lie to You? Australia, Spicks and Specks, The Weekly with Charlie Pickering, Have You Been Paying Attention?, Hughesy, We Have a Problem, The Rob Brydon Show, Russell Howard's Good News, Live At The Apollo, and Never Mind the Buzzcocks.

In 2021, Pacquola was the subject of the first episode of the twelfth season of the SBS documentary series Who Do You Think You Are?, which explored her family's ancestral history. From 2023, Pacquola will host a second revival of Thank God You're Here on Network 10, replacing Shane Bourne.

On 16 September 2024, Pacquola was announced as part of the cast for the Paramount+ series Playing Gracie Darling. On 9 September 2025, Pacquola was announced as appearing in the upcoming ABC series Dog Park. She is a featured contestant on the fifth season of the comedy panel show Taskmaster Australia.

=== Live performances ===
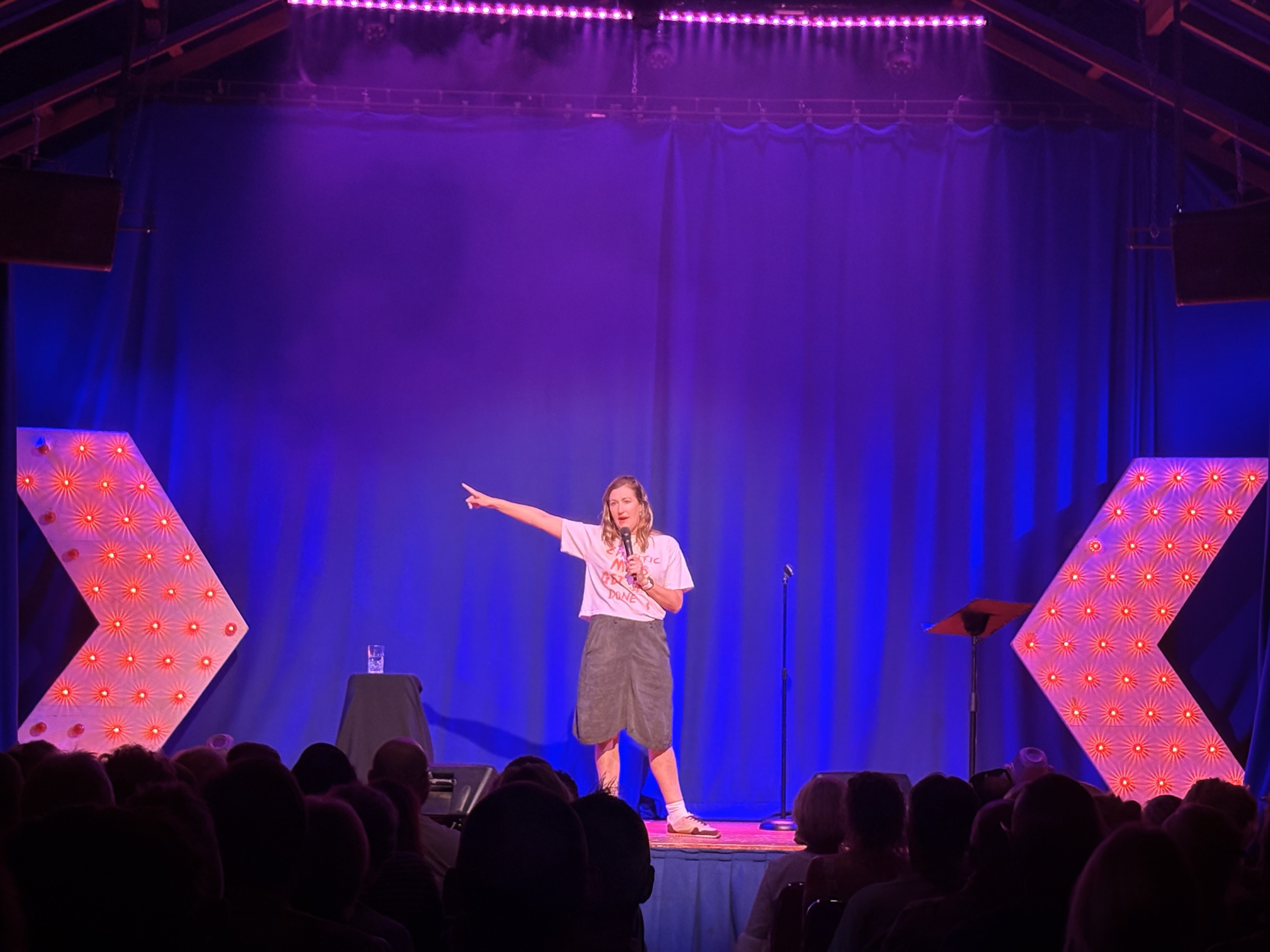
Pacquola performing her show Gift Horse at the Brunswick Picture House, Brunswick Heads, 2026

Pacquola has written and performed live shows since 2007. Her 2009 show Am I Strange? was performed at the Edinburgh Festival Fringe and the Melbourne International Comedy Festival, where it won Best Comedy and Critics Award for Best Australian Act. She performed in 2009 at the Sydney Opera House with This Was The Year That Was. The following year, she showcased Flying Solos at the Edinburgh Festival Fringe and the Melbourne International Comedy Festival and in 2012, returned with Delayed.

She has been nominated for and won a number of awards, including best first-time entrant (Raw Recruit Prize) at the Raw Comedy Awards in 2006.

In 2016, Pacquola hosted the Oxfam Gala for the Melbourne International Comedy Festival.

In 2018, she won the Helpmann Award for Best Comedy Performer for her stand-up comedy show All Talk. In 2019, Pacquola appeared as J. G. (Jenny) Milford in the Sydney Theatre Company's production of Oriel Gray's The Torrents. At the 2020 ARIA Music Awards, she was nominated for Best Comedy Release for her album All Talk.

Pacquola began touring with her show Gift Horse in 2026, which she first performed at the Brunswick Picture House, in Brunswick Heads.

=== Film ===
Pacquola's first movie role was in the 2018 New Zealand romantic comedy The Breaker Upperers alongside Madeleine Sami and Jackie van Beek, both of whom wrote and directed the film.

== Personal life ==
Pacquola openly talks about her anxiety and depression.

She gave birth to her first child, with partner Dara Munnis, in 2022.

== Selected filmography ==
=== Acting ===
List of film and television appearances, with year, title, and role shown
| Year | Title | Role | Notes |
|---|---|---|---|
| 2011–12 | Laid | EJ Griggs | 12 episodes |
| 2013–14 | Offspring | Ange Navarro | 18 episodes |
| 2013–14 | It's a Date | Cynthia | 2 episodes |
| 2014–15 | Kinne | Various | 9 episodes |
| 2014–23 | Utopia | Nat Russell | 40 episodes |
| 2015 | The Beautiful Lie | Dolly Faraday | 6 episodes |
| 2016–21 | Rosehaven | Emma Dawes | 40 episodes |
| 2017–19 | Mustangs FC | Narrator | 39 episodes |
| 2018 | The Breaker Upperers | Anna | Feature film |
| 2020 | Dancing with the Stars | Self | TV series |
| 2021 | The Truth About Anxiety | Self | Documentary |
| 2021, 2023 | Love Me | Sasha | 12 episodes |
| 2022 | Shut Up | Syballa | 6 episodes |
| 2023–present | Thank God You're Here | Host | |
| 2025 | Playing Gracie Darling | Ruth | TV series |
| 2026 | Dog Park | Samantha | 6 episodes |
| 2026 | Taskmaster Australia | Self | 10 episodes |

=== Production/writing ===
List of production/writing work, with year, title, and role shown
| Year | Title | Role | Notes |
|---|---|---|---|
| 2008–10 | Good News Week | Writer | 17 episodes |
| 2012 | Laid | Additional material writer | 6 episodes |
| 2012 | Warehouse Comedy Festival | Writer | |
| 2014 | It's a Date | Writer | 1 episode |
| 2016-21 | Rosehaven | Writer; producer | 40 episodes |
| 2017 | One Night Stan | Writer | 1 episode |
| 2020 | Australia's Funniest Stand up Specials | Writer | Special |
| 2021 | Celia Pacquola: Let Me Know How It All Works Out | Writer | Special |
| 2022 | Nude Tuesday | Writer | Film |
| 2023 | Love Me | Writer | 1 episode |
