= John Winter (filmmaker) =

Australian filmmaker

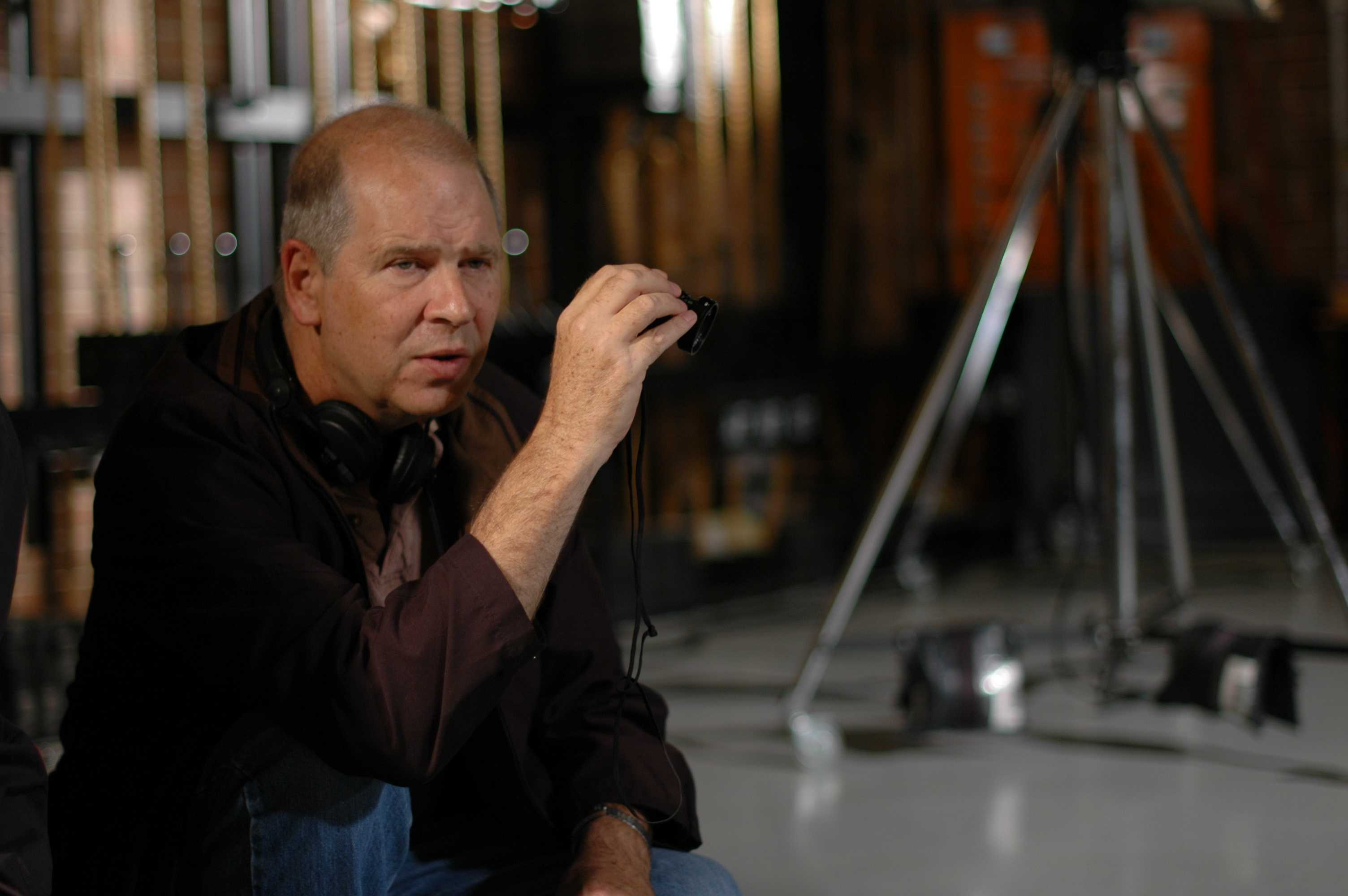
- Education: Arts Degree (Melbourne University) majoring in Anthropology & Indian Studies
- Occupations: Film and television writer, director and producer

John Winter is an Australian film and television writer, director and producer. His work as a producer includes Rabbit-Proof Fence, Doing Time for Patsy Cline and Paperback Hero. His directorial debut Black & White & Sex premiered at the 2011 Sydney Film Festival with its international premiere at the 41st International Film Festival Rotterdam. The film won the 'Best Experimental' at the 2012 ATOM Awards. In 2022, Winter co-founded The 100 Project, a documentary initiative featuring Australian centenarians.

== Career ==
Winter began his career at the ABC Television, where he was a production manager. His credits during this time include the Nature of Australia series, A Dangerous Life, Bodysurfer, Police Rescue, and Come in Spinner. During this period he co-wrote and directed the short film Paper Dart, that screened at the St Kilda Film Festival.

In 1995 he produced Vacant Possession which received 4 Australian Film Institute (AFI) nominations and won a Special Jury prize at Créteil.

In 1997 John also produced Doing Time for Patsy Cline which opened Sydney Film Festival and received 10 AFI nominations including Best Film. The film was a critical and box office success.

Winter was script producer on the first series of the ABC's high rating television drama series, Sea Change, before returning to producing with Paperback Hero starring Hugh Jackman and Claudia Karvan. My Mother Frank followed, premiering at Berlin International Film Festival. It starred Matthew Newton, Sinéad Cusack, and Sam Neill, closed the Sydney Film Festival and won Most Popular Feature Film at the Melbourne International Film Festival.

Winter also produced Phillip Noyce's acclaimed Rabbit-Proof Fence that won Best Film at the 2002 AFI Awards.

=== Writing & Directing ===
Winter has directed several short films, including Apartment 1911, which premiered at the 2016 Byron Bay Film Festival.

Mirror Mirror, starring Roy Billing, screened at 27 international film festivals, including Frameline and the London Lesbian & Gay Film Festival. It was the opening short of the 2008 Melbourne Queer Film Festival.

Winter's feature film directorial debut was Black & White & Sex (2011).The film had its world premiere at the Sydney Film Festival on 18 June 2011. It screened at the 41st International Film Festival Rotterdam (IFFR) and in competition at Taipei Film Festival 2012.

=== The 100 Project ===
In 2022, Winter co-founded The 100 Project with producer Ros Walker. The Australian documentary initiative records and publishes filmed interviews with people aged 100 and over, documenting their personal histories, experiences and perspectives.

=== Photography ===
Big Rigs, Small Moments was a finalist at the City of Sydney's 2026 Australian Life. Exhibited Sydney Square.

== Awards ==
- Winner 2002 AFI Award - Best Film Rabbit-Proof Fence
- Nominated 1997 AFI Award - Best Film Doing Time for Patsy Cline
- Winner 2012 ATOM Awards - 'Best Experimental' Black & White & Sex
- Nominated 2012 Taipei Film Festival - International New Talent Competition - Grand Prize Black & White & Sex
- Special Jury Prize 2023, Vindhya International Film Festival, Madhya Pradesh, India Khajuraho, My Love

== Selected filmography ==
Year	Title	Role
2023	Khajuraho, My Love	Director, producer, writer, cinematographer, editor
2022	The 100 Project	Co-Founder
2016	Apartment 1911	Director, producer, writer, cinematographer, editor
2011	Black & White & Sex	Director, producer and writer
2008	Mirror Mirror	Director, producer and writer (story)
2004	A Director's Gotta Do: The Producer's Cut	Producer, director, cinematographer
2004	A Man's Gotta Do	Producer
2002	Rabbit-Proof Fence	Producer
2000	My Mother Frank	Producer
1999	Paperback Hero	Producer
1998	SeaChange	Script Producer
1997	Doing Time for Patsy Cline	Producer
1996	Turning April	Producer
1995	Vacant Possession	Producer
1994	The Roly Poly Man	Line Producer
1993	Love in Limbo	Co-Producer
1993	'No Worries	Line Producer
