= Jane Sanderson =

British novelist

Jane Sanderson (born 17 August 1962 in Barnsley, South Yorkshire) is a British novelist.

Sanderson was educated at Kirk Balk School in Hoyland, and at Leicester University. She was a newspaper journalist before joining the BBC, where she was a producer on The World At One, PM, and Woman's Hour.

In 2011, Sanderson's debut novel, Netherwood, was published by Little, Brown. Set in a Yorkshire pit village around the turn of the 20th century, and based in part on Sanderson's own family history, it has been widely acclaimed and is the first in a series. The sequel, Ravenscliffe, was published in September 2012, and the third book in the series, Eden Falls, in September 2013. Sanderson's fourth book, This Much Is True, is a contemporary family drama and not part of the Netherwood series. It was published in May 2017 by Orion. Her fifth book, Mix Tape, was published by Transworld in January 2020, and has subsequently been published in Germany, France, Italy, Poland, the Czech Republic and Slovakia. Sanderson's most recent novel, Waiting For Sunshine, was published by Transworld in July 2022.

Sanderson has been married since 1993 to the journalist and author Brian Viner.
