= Aina Dumlao =

Filipino-American Actress

- Born: October 12, 1984 (age 42); Quezon City, Philippines

Aina Dumlao (born October 12, 1984) is a Filipino-American actress best known for her roles as Andie Lee in MacGyver (2016), Natalie in Ballers (2018), Gerlie Bernardo in Grey's Anatomy (2021), and Evie Dela Rosa in the limited series The Unusual Suspects (2021).

== Early life ==
Dumlao was born in Quezon City, Philippines where her mother Eufrosina still lives.

== Acting career ==
In 2015, Dumlao was cast in her first television role in the short-lived series State of Affairs (2015) produced by and starring Katherine Heigl. In 2017, Dumlao was cast in the CBS series MacGyver (2016) as Phoenix Foundation agent Andie Lee. Dumlao recurred from seasons 1–2 as the personal assistant of Patricia Thornton (Sandrine Holt), director of field operations for the DXS and the Phoenix Foundation. Dumlao also played Hank Azaria's on-screen wife in an episode of IFC's Brockmire (2017), followed by a recurring role in HBO's Ballers (2017) where she played Spencer (Dwayne Johnson) and Joe's (Rob Corddry) disgruntled, ax-wielding employee.

Dumlao played her first feature film lead role in the thriller Sanzaru (2020), premiered at Slamdance in 2020.

Dumlao guest starred as Gerlie Bernardo in the season 17 finale of Grey's Anatomy as the first Filipino-American nurse headlining the medical drama.

Dumlao headlined The Unusual Suspects (2021). Dumlao plays a nanny, Evie De La Rosa, who is a godmother of sorts for other Filipino domestic workers in the rich suburbs of Sydney.

== Filmography ==
Filmography of Aina Dumlao
Year	Title	Role	Notes
2015	State of Affairs	Tour guide	TV series
2016	Last Man Standing	Assistant	TV series
2016-17	MacGyver	Andie Lee	TV series
2017	Me, Myself and I	Doctor	TV series
2017	Brockmire	Ligaya	TV series
2017	Ballers	Natalie	TV series
2018	Diwa	Diwa	Film
2020	Sanzaru	Evelyn	Film
2021	The Upshaws	Ms. Lee	TV series
2021	Grey's Anatomy	Gerlie Bernardo	TV series
2021	The Unusual Suspects	Evie Dela Rosa	TV series
