= Matt Okine =

Australian comedian (born 1985)

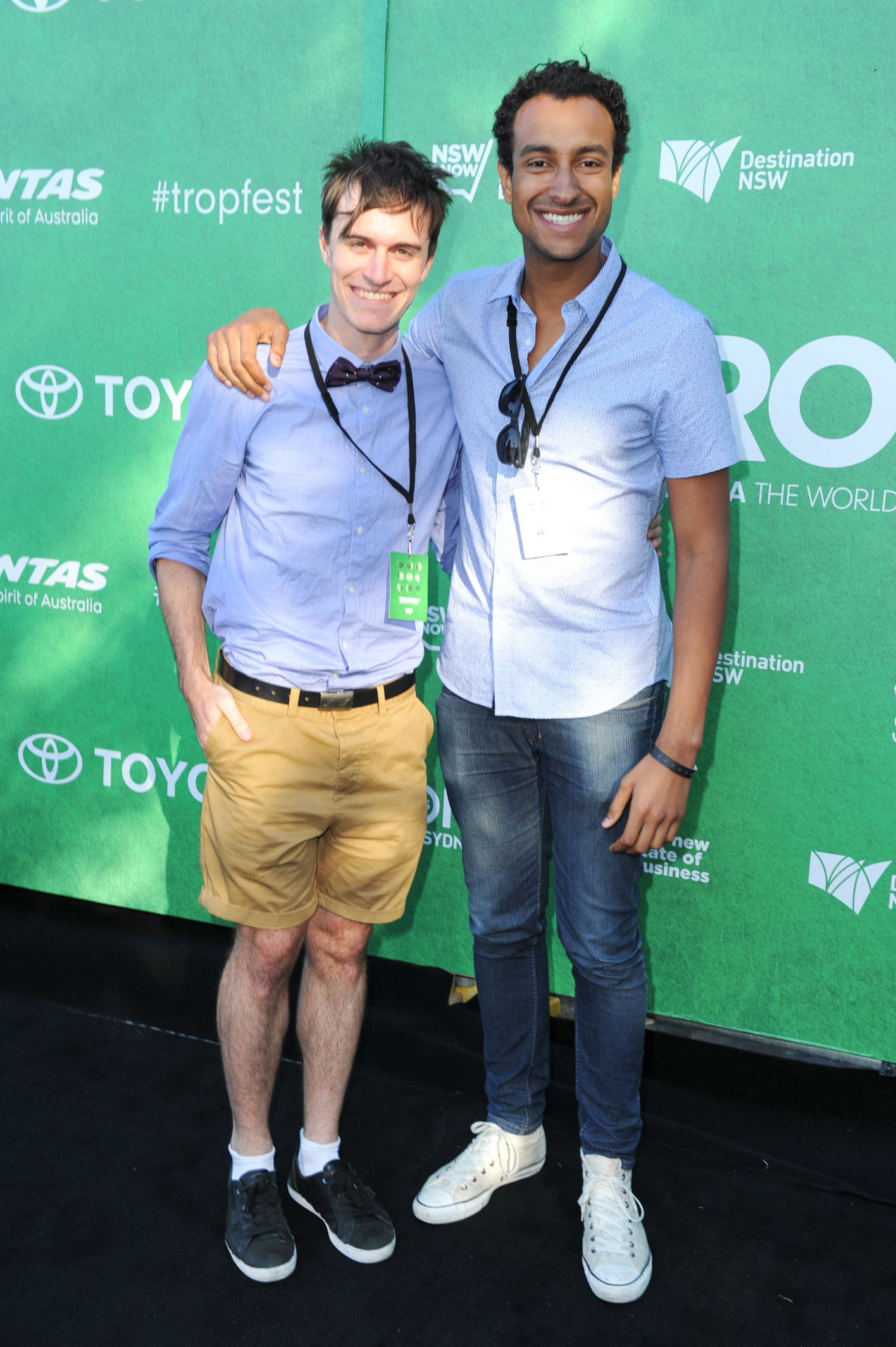
- Okine (right) with co-host Alex Dyson at Tropfest Australia 2013
- Born: Matthew Okine; 12 April 1985 (age 41); Brisbane, Queensland, Australia
- Education: Queensland University of Technology
- Partner: Belinda Rabe
- Children: 1

Comedy career
- Medium: Stand-up, radio, television

Matthew Okine (born 12 April 1985) is a stand-up comedian, author and radio presenter from Brisbane, Australia. He was a co-host on the Triple J breakfast show with Alex Dyson from 2014 to 2016.

== Early life ==
Okine was born to Mack Okine and Roslyn. His father is an immigrant from Ghana. He has an older sister. His parents separated when he was 7. His mother died of breast cancer when he was 12.

Okine attended Ironside State School and Brisbane State High School and played many sports growing up. He was considered a promising Australian rules football prospect, and was invited to take part in the AFL's NAB Rising Stars national development program. He stopped playing football after being advised to do so upon entry into drama school at Queensland University of Technology. He graduated with a bachelor in acting. He supports his hometown Brisbane Lions in the Australian Football League.

== Career ==
Okine performed stand-up on Rove, at the Sydney Comedy Festival and Melbourne International Comedy Festival. He appeared on TV shows This is Littleton, Legally Brown, Would I Lie to You? and Hughesy, We Have a Problem and was a guest contributor on Dirty Laundry Live, Can of Worms and The Agony of Modern Manners. In 2012, he released a DVD titled Being Black n Chicken n Shit. He also appeared as Laurie in H_{2}O: Just Add Water and Aquamarine as an unknown character.

In 2014, Okine replaced Tom Ballard as co-host on the breakfast show on Triple J after Ballard resigned to pursue stand-up comedy. In 2016, Okine and Alex Dyson both left Triple J to pursue other interests.

He co-hosted How Not to Behave, which ran for four months on ABC in 2015.

At the 2015 ARIA Awards, he won Best Comedy Release for Live at the Enmore Theatre.

In 2017, Okine wrote and starred in The Other Guy on Stan. A second season was released in 2019.

In 2019, he published his first novel, Being Black 'N Chicken, & Chips.

In November 2022, it was revealed that Okine would star as Arthur Beare in a 2023 "reimagining" of classic sitcom Mother and Son which originally aired on ABC TV from 1984 to 1994. Okine is also the creator, writer and executive producer of the new series. The concept to adapt the sitcom as a single-camera production from what was originally a multi-camera setup filmed in front of a live studio audience was first proposed by Okine in 2013. Creator of the original series Geoffrey Atherden would collaborate with Okine on the 2023 version. On 15 August 2024, Mother and Son was renewed for a second season. He appeared as Devon in the 2023 TV series The Clearing.

Okine is one half of the children's music duo Diver City, with Kristy Lee Peters.

== Personal life ==
Okine and his partner Belinda Rabe have a daughter.

== Filmography ==
=== Acting ===
Television appearances
Year	Title	Role	Notes	Ref
2026	Class Clowns	Self	6 episodes	
2026	Gnomes	TBA	TV series	
2023–present	Mother and Son	Arthur	8 episodes	
2023	The Clearing	Devon	1 episode	
2022	Fisk	Theo	1 episode	
2021	Nine Perfect Strangers		1 episode	
2021	Slider	Lewis	1 episode	
2020–23	Play School	Self	3 episodes	
2020	Stateless	Phil	2 episodes	
2017–19	The Other Guy	AJ Amon	12 episodes	
2019	Greta Stanley: Pour	Teddy	Music video	
2018	Orange Is the New Brown	Various	6 episodes	
2018	Doctor Doctor	Dr Lucas Fine	1 episode	
2018	Aunty Donna: The Album	Boilermakers	1 episode	
2017	Jay of our Lives	Matt	1 episode	
2016–17	Wham Bam Thank You Mam!	Officer Michaels	6 episodes	
2015	Ready for This	Matt	1 episode	
2015	Fresh Blood Pilot Season	Officer Michaels	1 episode	
2014	It's a Date	George	1 episode	
2014	This is Littleton	Various	4 episodes	
2013	Neighbours	Nathan White	1 episode	
2012	People You May Know	Otto	TV series	
2011	Purged	Jesus	TV movie	
2011	Sea Patrol	Mr Tagobe	1 episode	
2010	I Rock	Greg Forbes	1 episode	
2010	The Future Machine	Matt	8 episodes	
2007–10	H2O: Just Add Water	Laurie	5 episodes	
2009	All Saints	Brendan	1 episode	
2006	Monarch Cove	Carlos	1 episode	

Film appearances
Year	Title	Role	Notes	Ref
2022	Christmas Ransom	Derrick		
2019	Martha the Monster	Comedy Host	Short	
2019	Dora and the Lost City of Gold	Teacher		
2012	Magic Dogs	Mr Grange	Short	
2011	Up the Aisle	The Baker		
2011	Bird Therapy	Matty the Blackbird	Short	
2010	Cabbie Confessions	Cabbie	Short	
2006	Sweet FA	Matty		
2006	See No Evil	Officer 3		
2006	Aquamarine	Nick		

=== Production credits ===
Year	Title	Role	Notes
2023–	Mother and Son	Creator / Writer	8 episodes
2017–19	The Other Guy	Creator / Writer	12 episodes
2018	Squinters	Additional material	6 episodes
2015	Matt Okine Live at Enmore Theatre	Written by	TV special
2014	This is Littleton	Writer	4 episodes
2012	Matt Okine: Being Black N Chicken N Shit	Written by	TV special
2011	Bird Therapy	Writer	Short
2010	Not Available	Creator	TV movie
2010	The Future Machine	Writer	8 episodes

=== Self appearances ===
Year	Title	Role	Notes	Ref
2026	Class Clowns	Self	6 episodes	
2026	Shaun Micallef's Origin Odyssey	Self	1 episode	
2025	Claire Hooper's House Of Games	Self	5 episodes	
2024	Drag Race Down Under	Self / Guest Judge	1 episode	
2023	The Project	Self	1 episode	
2023	Matt Okine is Going to Die	Self	Catalyst feature: 1 episode	
2022	The Cook Up with Adam Liaw	Self	2 episodes	
2015	How Not To Behave	Self / Host	15 episodes	

== Discography ==
List of albums
Title	Album details
Play It Out (with Alex Dyson)	Released: 2016; Label: ABC; Formats: CD, download

== Awards and nominations ==
Year	Nominee / work	Award	Result	Ref.
2015	Live at the Enmore Theatre	Best Comedy Release	Won	
2016	Play It Out (with Alex Dyson)	Best Comedy Release	Nominated	
