= Angie Fielder =

Australian film producer

Angie Fielder is an Australian film producer. She is best known for producing critically acclaimed film Lion (2016) that earned her Academy Award for Best Picture nomination with Emile Sherman and Iain Canning.

She is a co-founder of production company Aquarius Films.

She is co-producer of the 2021 comedy drama TV miniseries on SBS, The Unusual Suspects.

== Filmography ==
Year	Film	Director	Notes
2012	Wish You Were Here	Kieran Darcy-Smith	Nominated — AACTA Award for Best Film; Nominated — FCCA Award for Best Film
2016	Lion	Garth Davis	Nominated — AACTA International Award for Best Film; Nominated — Academy Award for Best Picture; Nominated — Critics' Choice Movie Award for Best Picture; Nominated — Golden Globe Award for Best Motion Picture – Drama; Nominated — Satellite Award for Best Film
