= Diego Baldenweg with Nora Baldenweg and Lionel Baldenweg =

Swiss-Australian sibling trio known for advertising and film scores

- Genres: Film score, music in advertising
- Occupations: Composers, music producers, musicians
- Years active: 2004—present
- Label: Great Garbo Music
- Members: Diego Baldenweg; Lionel Baldenweg; Nora Baldenweg
- Website: www.baldenwegmusic.com

Diego Baldenweg with Nora Baldenweg and Lionel Baldenweg is the Swiss/Australian composer trio sometimes referred to as BALDENWEG (stylised in all caps) or the Baldenweg siblings. In the field of advertising they are also firming as Great Garbo (stylised in all caps).

== Career ==
The three siblings Diego Baldenweg, Lionel Baldenweg, and Nora Baldenweg work together as a team: Diego Baldenweg (composer); Nora Baldenweg (co-composer); and Lionel Baldenweg (co-composer). Together they founded the music production company GREAT GARBO in 2004. Since then the siblings have composed and produced the music to over 400 international advertising campaigns for brands such as Carlsberg, Mastercard, Nivea, Sony, Switzerland Tourism and Dove.

They have composed music for many films such as Otfried Preußler's bestselling children's book adaptation The Little Witch starring Karoline Herfurth; the film La femme et le TGV starring Jane Birkin, Til Schweiger's US remake of his German film Head Full of Honey, starring Nick Nolte, Matt Dillon and Emily Mortimer and for Robert Lorenz's In the Land of Saints and Sinners starring Liam Neeson, Kerry Condon, Ciarán Hinds, Colm Meaney and Jack Gleeson.

In 2019 they composed the entire original score to the Australian teenage sci-fi series The Unlisted (ABC/Netflix), created by Justine Flynn and produced by Polly Staniford and Angie Fielder. They also produced, arranged and performed a remake of Pink Floyd's "Another Brick in the Wall" for the opening theme.

The Baldenweg siblings have worked with orchestras like the Czech National Symphony Orchestra, Macedonian Radio Symphony Orchestra and The City of Prague Philharmonic Orchestra. Other notable collaborations include their work with American conductor David Zinman and the Tonhalle Orchestra for their score to "180°" and with British-Irish violinist Daniel Hope and the Zurich Chamber Orchestra for their score to "The Reformer Zwingli". In 2021 they composed 'Eye to the World - Zurich Film Festival Suite' which was recorded with conductor Paavo Järvi and the Tonhalle-Orchester Zürich and since serves as the official music for the Zurich Film Festival.

The Baldenwegs are voting members of the Academy of Motion Picture Arts and Sciences(Diego), Society of Composers and Lyricists, Alliance for Women Film Composers (Nora), Art Directors Club, Swiss Film Academy, European Film Academy, Australian Academy of Cinema and Television Arts, Swiss Media Composers Association, Australian Guild of Screen Composers. and the World Soundtrack Academy.

== Style ==
Diego Baldenweg, Lionel Baldenweg, and Nora Baldenweg's musical range moves within classic orchestral, subtle electronics and lyrical/non-lyrical vocals. Their production company logo depicts a "wheelie" garbage bin, and its name puns on Greta Garbo and a Garbo which is an Australian slang term for waste collector.

== Recognition ==
They were the first Swiss composers to be nominated for their film music at the World Soundtrack Awards in 2019 (Public Choice) and 2024 (Discovery of the Year and Public Choice) and to be nominated twice for "Score of the Year" at the Movie Music UK Awards in 2019 and 2024.. In 2025 Diego Baldenweg became the first Swiss composer ever to be invited to join the Academy of Motion Picture Arts and Sciences.

They were the second Australian composers ever (besides Nick Cave / Warren Ellis) to be nominated for the World Soundtrack Awards (Discovery of the Year and Public Choice) in 2024.

== Members ==
Besides her career in music, Nora Baldenweg simultaneously held positions in fashion publishing as editor-at-large/Paris director (Russh), editor-at-large/Paris director/senior editor (Indie), editor-at-large/fashion features director (Material Girl) and was a contributing writer for Vogue Taiwan, Nylon, Dazed Digital and Wallpaper.

In May 2014 she relaunched the Paris-based magazine Modzik as editor-in-chief. In May 2017 she became editor-in-chief of UK-based magazine Lula. Since 2017 she works as a creative director (fashion) for various brands.

== Films (selection) ==
Year	Title	Director	Studio(s)	Notes
2005	The Ring Thing	Marc Schippert	Elevator Group, Condor Films	theme music and ~1/5 of the score
2005	Rascals on the Road	Michael Steiner	Kontra; C-Films	Collaboration with composer Adrian Frutiger; Soundtrack released by Sony BMG
2006	Cannabis	Niklaus Hilber	Vega Film	
2010	180°	Cihan Inan	C-Films	Collaboration with conductor David Zinman and Tonhalle Orchester Zürich; Soundtrack released by GREAT GARBO music / Praesens; Winner Suisa Prize “Best Original Music” Locarno International Film Festival
2012	Summer Outside	Friederike Jehn	Goldenes Lamm; C-Films	Soundtrack released by GREAT GARBO music
2013	Hylas and the Nymphs (Short)	Lisa Brühlmann	ZHDK	
2014	Aimless	Niklaus Hilber	Hesse Greutert Film	
2016	Lina	Michael Schaerer	C-Films	Soundtrack released by GREAT GARBO music
2016	La femme et le TGV (Short)	Timo von Gunten	BMC Films	Soundtrack released by GREAT GARBO music Finalist “Best Short Film Score” Music+ Sound Awards (International)
2017	The Final Touch	Rolf Lyssy	Lang Film	Soundtrack released by Swiss Treasure Recordings / GREAT GARBO music Finalist “Best Feature Film Score” Music+Sound Awards (International)
2018	The Little Witch by Otfried Preußler	Michael Schaerer	Claussen+Putz; Studiocanal; Disney	Soundtrack released by Claussen+Putz Filmproduktion GmbH / Rambling Records Japan; Winner “Best Original Score” Swiss Film Prize
2018	Zone Rouge	Cihan Inan	Abrakadabra Films	Soundtrack released by GREAT GARBO music
2018	Head Full of Honey	Til Schweiger	Barefoot Films; Warner Bros.	Co-composer Martin Todsharow
2019	The Reformer Zwingli	Stefan Haupt	C-Films; Ascote Elite	Collaboration with violinist Daniel Hope and Zurich Chamber Orchestra; Soundtrack released by C-Films / GREAT GARBO music Nominated “Best Score of the Year” World Soundtrack Awards (Public Choice); Nominated "Score of the Year" Movie Music UK Awards; Nominated "Best Original Score for a Drama Film" Movie Music UK Awards
2023/24	In the Land of Saints and Sinners	Robert Lorenz	Facing East; RagBag Pictures; Prodigal Films Limited	Conducted by Dirk Brossé and performed by Galaxy Symphonic Orchestra feat. Pfuri Baldenweg on harmonica. Soundtrack digitally released by Sony Music Masterworks; Soundtrack physically (CD) released by Caldera Records Nominated "Score of the Year" Movie Music UK Awards; Nominated "Best Original Score for a Thriller/Horror Film" Movie Music UK Awards; Nominated "Discovery of the Year" World Soundtrack Awards; Nominated "Public Choice" World Soundtrack Awards; Nominated "Best Original Score in an Independent Film" Hollywood Music in Media Awards; Co-Winner "Best Original Score in 2024" On the Score; Winner "Best Original Score in a Drama" Movie Music International
2025	The Safe House	Lionel Baier	Bande à Part Films	film adaptation of Prix Femina winning novel 'La Cache' by Christophe Boltanski; Finalist “Best Feature Film Score” Music+Sound Awards (International); Nominated “Best Original Score” Swiss Film Prize
2026	Butterfly Stroke (in production)	Denis Rabaglia	Turnus Film, Zephyr Films	

== Television (selection) ==
Year	Title	Director	Studio(s)	Notes
2019	The Unlisted	Justine Flynn; Rhys Graham; Neil Sharma; Nicholas Verso; Lucy Gaffy; Rebecca O'Brien	Aquarius Films; ABC Me / Netflix	Soundtrack released by GREAT GARBO music Nominated for “Best Original Music in TV” AACTA Awards
2019	Itch by Simon Mayo	Renée Webster; Nicholas Verso	Komixx Entertainment; ABC Me / CBBC (TV channel)	Nominated for “Best Original Music in TV” AACTA Awards
2021	Born to Spy	Nicholas Verso; Chase Lee; Hyun Lee; Darlene Johnson; Neil Sharm; Justine Flynn	Aquarius Films; ABC Me	Soundtrack released by GREAT GARBO music Nominated for “Best Original Music in TV” AACTA Awards
2021	Itch Season 2 by Simon Mayo	Nicholas Verso; Tenika Smith	Komixx Entertainment; ABC Me / CBBC (TV channel)	

== Awards and nominations ==
- 2006 – Winner «Best Music» EDI Awards (Federal Department of Home Affairs) – "KUONI"
- 2006 – Winner «Best Music» EDI Awards (Federal Department of Home Affairs) – "Love Life – Stop Aids (Federal Office of Public Health)"
- 2010 – Winner «Best Film Music» Suisa Prize Locarno International Film Festival – "180°"
- 2011 – Nomination «Best Film Music» Swiss Film Award – "180°"
- 2014 – Shortlist «Best Music» Art Directors Club Switzerland – "SONY"
- 2015 – Shortlist «Best Music» Art Directors Club Switzerland – "SWISS LIFE"
- 2017 – Finalist «Best Short Film Score» Music + Sound Awards (International) - "La Femme et le TGV"
- 2018 – Finalist «Best Feature Film Score» Music + Sound Awards (International) - "The Final Touch / Die letzte Pointe"
- 2018 – Winner «Best Film Music» Swiss Film Award – The Little Witch
- 2019 – Nomination «Best Score of the Year» World Soundtrack Awards (Public Choice) – "The Reformer Zwingli"
- 2019 – Nomination «Best Original Music in TV» Australian Academy Award – AACTA – "The Unlisted"
- 2020 – Nomination «Score of the Year» and «Best Original Score for a Drama Film» Movie Music UK Awards – "The Reformer Zwingli"
- 2020 – Nomination «Best Original Music in TV» Australian Academy Award – AACTA – "Itch (TV series)"
- 2021 – Winner «ADC Bronze for Best Music» Art Directors Club Switzerland – "Swiss Film Award"
- 2021 – Finalist «Best Original Composition in Branding» Music + Sound Awards (International) - "Swiss Film Award"
- 2021 – Winner «Prix de la Meilleure Musique Originale» Festival International du Film Indépendant de Bordeaux, France – "The Life Underground"
- 2021 – Winner «Composer of the Year - Outstanding Achievements in Film Music» 46th "Prix Walo"
- 2022 – Winner «Gold: Best Supplier Services», Xaver Award for Excellence in Live Communications, Switzerland - Audio Branding: "Swiss Film Award"
- 2022 – Finalist «Best Original Composition in Branding», Music + Sound Awards (International), United Kingdom - Audio Branding: "Zurich Film Festival"
- 2022 – Finalist «Best Original Composition in a Short Film», Music + Sound Awards (International), United Kingdom - Film: "The Life Underground"
- 2022 – Nomination «Best Original Music in TV», Australian Academy Award - AACTA, Australia - TV Series: Born to Spy
- 2022 – Winner «Bronze: Film & Audio Craft - Music and Sound», ADC Europe Awards, Spain - Audio Branding: "Zurich Film Festival"
- 2023 – Finalist «Best Original Composition in Branding», Music + Sound Awards (International), United Kingdom - Champagne Symphony: "KRUG Champagne"
- 2023 – Finalist «Best Artist + Brand Collaboration», Music + Sound Awards (International), United Kingdom - KRUG X BALDENWEG: "KRUG Champagne"
- 2024 – Nomination «Best Original Score for a Thriller/Horror Film» Movie Music UK Awards – "In the Land of Saints and Sinners"
- 2024 – Nomination «Score of the Year» Movie Music UK Awards – "In the Land of Saints and Sinners"
- 2024 – Nomination «Discovery of the Year» World Soundtrack Awards – "In the Land of Saints and Sinners"
- 2024 – Nomination «Public Choice: Score of the Year» World Soundtrack Awards – "In the Land of Saints and Sinners"
- 2024 – Nomination «Best Original Score in an Independent Film» Hollywood Music in Media – "In the Land of Saints and Sinners"
- 2024 – Co-Winner «Best Original Score in 2024» On the Score Awards – "In the Land of Saints and Sinners"
- 2024 – Winner «Best Original Score in a Drama» Movie Music International Awards – "In the Land of Saints and Sinners"
- 2025 – Winner «ADC Silver for Best Music» Art Directors Club Switzerland – "Switzerland Tourism"
- 2025 – Winner EDI Award (Federal Department of Home Affairs) «Best Music» – "Falling for Autumn Switzerland Tourism"
- 2025 – Finalist «Best Original Music in a Feature Film», Music + Sound Awards (International), United Kingdom - The Safe House / La Cache
- 2026 – Nomination «Best Film Music» Swiss Film Award – The Safe House / La Cache
