= Head Full of Honey =

Head Full of Honey may refer to:

- Head Full of Honey (2014 film), a German drama film
- Head Full of Honey (2018 film), an American drama film, a remake of the above
