= Born to Spy =

Australian drama television series

- Genre: Action-adventure; Family
- Created by: Justine Flynn
- Written by: Tiffany Zehnal; Tristram Baumber; Michelle Lim Davidson; Melissa Lee Speyer; Andrew Lee; David D.S. Park; Sophia Chung; Alice McCredie-Dando; Hyun Lee; Justine Flynn
- Directed by: Chase Lee; Hyun Lee; Darlene Johnson; Neil Sharma; Justine Flynn
- Starring: Hannah Kim; Ocean Lim; Lulu Quirk; Alex Kis; George Holahan-Cantwell; Eduard Geyl; Danny Kim; Julia Yon; Nicholas Hope
- Theme music composer: Diego Baldenweg with Nora Baldenweg and Lionel Baldenweg
- Composers: Diego Baldenweg; Nora Baldenweg; Lionel Baldenweg
- Country of origin: Australia
- Original language: English
- No. of seasons: 1
- No. of episodes: 10

Production
- Executive producer: Justine Flynn
- Producers: Angie Fielder; Polly Staniford; Naomi Just; David Park; Anne Robinson
- Production locations: Sydney, New South Wales
- Camera setup: Multi-camera
- Running time: 24 minutes
- Production company: Aquarius Films

Original release
- Network: ABC Me

Born to Spy is an Australian children's television series.

Born to Spy was created by Justine Flynn, produced by Naomi Just, Angie Fielder and Polly Staniford. It was written by Tiffany Zehnal, Tristram Baumber, Michelle Lim Davidson, Melissa Lee Speyer, Andrew Lee, David D.S. Park, Sophia Chung, Alice McCredie-Dando, Hyun Lee and Justine Flynn. It was directed by Chase Lee, Hyun Lee, Darlene Johnson, Neil Sharma and Justine Flynn.

== Cast ==
- Hannah Kim as Yu Na Park
- Ocean Lim as Min Park
- Lulu Quirk as Dutch
- Alex Kis as Allegra
- George Holahan-Cantwell as Raph
- Eduard Geyl as Talgat Foster
- Danny Kim as Joon Park
- Julia Yon as Soo-Jin Park
- Nicholas Hope as Mr. Potts
- Socratis Otto as George Papadopoulos
- Shondelle Pratt as Ms Waters
- Miritana Hughes as Mr. Turei
- Rajan Velu as Principal Singhal
- Matthew Backer as Mr. Brown
- Josh Quong Tart as Tradie

== International broadcast ==
In the United Kingdom, all episodes were added to BBC iPlayer on June 29, 2022. The series made its British television debut on CBBC on July 25, 2022.
