= In the Land of Saints and Sinners =

2023 action thriller film

- Theatrical release poster
- Directed by: Robert Lorenz
- Written by: Mark Michael McNally; Terry Loane
- Produced by: Markus Barmettler; Philip Lee; Bonnie Timmermann; Geraldine Hughes; Terry Loane; Adrian Grabe; Daniel Fluri
- Starring: Liam Neeson; Kerry Condon; Jack Gleeson; Colm Meaney; Ciarán Hinds
- Cinematography: Tom Stern
- Edited by: Jeremiah O'Driscoll
- Music by: Diego Baldenweg with Nora Baldenweg & Lionel Baldenweg
- Production companies: Facing East; RagBag Pictures; Prodigal Films Limited
- Distributed by: Netflix
- Release dates: 6 September 2023 (Venice); 26 April 2024 (Ireland)
- Running time: 106 minutes
- Country: Ireland
- Language: English
- Box office: $3.2 million

In the Land of Saints and Sinners is a 2023 Irish action thriller film directed by Robert Lorenz and written by Mark Michael McNally and Terry Loane. The film stars Liam Neeson in the lead role, alongside other Irish actors including Kerry Condon, Jack Gleeson, Colm Meaney and Ciarán Hinds. This is Neeson's second collaboration with Lorenz, after the 2021 film The Marksman. In the movie, a former hitman leading a quiet life in a coastal Irish village comes out of retirement when an IRA bomber on the run from the law arrives to cause harm.

The film premiered at the 80th Venice International Film Festival on 6 September 2023. It was released for streaming on Netflix on 26 April 2024.

== Plot ==
In 1974, during the Troubles, four members of the Provisional Irish Republican Army -the fanatical Doireann and the three men in her squad: Conan, Séamus and Curtis (Doireann's younger brother and the least disciplined of the lot) - carry out a bombing in Belfast that kills six people, including three children. The four then come to the Irish coastal town of Glencolmcille, County Donegal, to lie low since Doireann had been identified to the Royal Ulster Constabulary (RUC) because she had gotten out of the car to try to shoo the children away from the front of the pub that was bombed. In Glencolmcille, Curtis stays with Sinéad, the widowed keeper of the local pub who is his sister-in-law, and her young daughter Moya, and the rest stay in a ramshackle shack.

Finbar Murphy lives a quiet life in Glencolmcille. Apparently, when he returned from the Second World War, he found that his wife had died, and he fell into an alcohol-fueled depression. A local crime boss, Robert McQue, rescued him from the bottle and put him to work by using his combat experience as a contract killer. Posing as a book-seller, he is friendly with the local Garda officer, Vinnie, and with Finbar's neighbour, Rita. He travels to Bantry, County Cork, and kidnaps a target in a routine job. The target is a former contract killer, who, while waiting for Finbar to shoot him at his self-dug grave, urges him to make something of the rest of his life. Finbar then ends his relationship with Robert when he collects on the killing, which forces the latter to rely on Kevin, a troubled younger man, for future jobs.

Finbar discovers bruises on Sinéad's young daughter Moya, but Moya is too afraid to reveal the culprit to him or to her mother. He surmises that Curtis is sexually abusing her. Finbar goes for advice to Robert about what to do, but Robert warns him that the Garda are unlikely to make an arrest unless Moya comes forward, an idea that Finbar immediately rejects, but if Finbar were to call the Garda on her behalf, that might lead to additional scrutiny of their criminal affairs. Instead, Finbar decides to lure Curtis into his car and drives him to a forested grove, where he secretly buries his victims. While still on the road, Finbar lets Curtis out of the trunk of his car but fumbles when he is loading his shotgun while Curtis flees down the road. When Finbar catches up with the wounded Curtis, a wet shotgun shell misfires, and Curtis pulls a knife. Finbar survives only because Kevin, having been sent by Robert to keep an eye on him, uses his high-powered hunting rifle to shoot Curtis dead from a distance. Finbar and Kevin then bury the body and bond over their dreams for the future, but Finbar finds Kevin's cavalier attitude toward killings distasteful.

When Curtis fails to return to the shack in which they are hiding, Doireann gets a tip that the local mob boss (Robert) may have information. She goes to Robert's house and confronts him, but he feigns ignorance until she discovers evidence that he knows more about the death than he admits. She then kills Robert after he discloses Finbar's name, and she forces her companions to help locate Finbar. Finbar and Kevin console Robert's mother, as Doireann ransacks Finbar's house and attacks Rita, who has come out of her house to see what the strangers are up to. Later that day, Finbar and Doireann run into each other at a local Gaelic football match, and Finbar attempts to resolve the situation by observing that they have each killed someone close to the other and hence should call it even. Doireann rejects the offer and insists that Finbar deliver up the killer. Finbar offers to do so in exchange for their departure from Glencolmcille. Doireann insists that they rendezvous at Sinéad's bar that evening.

Finbar tries to convince Kevin to follow his dream of moving to California to write songs by giving Kevin his life savings. Kevin seems to accept the offer and then drives away. At the bar that evening, Doireann instructs her men to cover her, with Conan going inside as a backup with a bomb in a satchel with instructions to set the timer and blow up the crowded bar if things go wrong. Séamus remains in the getaway vehicle and is ready to help his comrades escape. While exiting the pub to have a cigarette, Vinnie recognises Séamus, who is in the car since he had briefly met him earlier in a local shop, where he claimed to be Finbar's nephew.

Meanwhile, inside the pub, Finbar and Doireann have a tense conversation at the bar, but Kevin suddenly shows up, tries to distract Doireann and ends up telling her that he is the one who killed her brother. Doireann then shoots him in the gut, which starts a shootout. Vinnie manages to take the bomb out of the bar with the intent of dispatching it further down the street. Séamus exits the car, knocks him out, reclaims the satchel bomb and brings it to the front door of the pub. As Kevin bleeds profusely down on the floor with his back against the wall, he shoots Doireann in the shoulder and saves Finbar once again from Doireann. Just after killing a wounded Conan with Curtis's knife, Finbar shoots Séamus before he can toss the satchel back into the pub. It explodes just outside the front door and kills Séamus. Doireann makes it back to the car but is unable to start it without the keys, which Séamus had.

Mortally wounded, Doireann limps across a field to a church, and Finbar follows her with his shotgun, which he had retrieved from the back seat of the terrorists' car since they had stolen it from his house earlier in the day when they ransacked it. After a brief conversation during which Doireann observes that her brother will be all alone, Finbar tells her that he will make sure she joins him (at his burial site). She then dies from her wounds. Finbar buries her next to her brother.

Back at his home, Finbar then bids farewell to Rita and leaves Glencolmcille behind. Vinnie discovers that Finbar has gifted him the novel Crime and Punishment.

== Cast ==
- Liam Neeson as Finbar Murphy
- Kerry Condon as Doireann McCann
- Jack Gleeson as Kevin Lynch
- Ciarán Hinds as Vinnie O'Shea
- Sarah Greene as Sinead
- Colm Meaney as Robert McQue
- Desmond Eastwood as Curtis June
- Niamh Cusack as Rita
- Conor MacNeill as Conan McGrath
- Seamus O'Hara as Séamus McKenna
- Mark O'Regan as Bart McGuiness
- Valentine Olukoga as Hasan Bello
- Michelle Gleeson as Moya
- Bernadette Carty as Mum Outside Pub
- Conor Hamill as Pat O'Donnell
- Anne Brogan as Josie McQue

== Production ==
In October 2021, it was announced that Liam Neeson would star in an Ireland-set thriller film and team again with director Robert Lorenz. Ciarán Hinds, who is a longtime friend of Neeson, was also announced as starring in the film. In April 2022, Kerry Condon was announced as part of the cast. The screenplay was written by Mark Michael McNally and Terry Loane, with revisions by Matthew Feitshans. Principal photography was lined up for March 2022 in Ireland. In 2022, the film was primarily shot in County Donegal, with additional filming in Dublin.

=== Soundtrack ===
The soundtrack for the film was created by Diego, Nora and Lionel Baldenweg. The official track listing is as follows:

1.	Fleeing West	3:19
2.	Ocean's Tale	1:48
3.	Lone Ranger	1:42
4.	In the Land of Saints	1:59
5.	Road to Bantry	1:55
6.	The Forgotten County	1:48
7.	Irish Western Ballad	1:53
8.	The Cross-Etched Bullet	1:28
9.	Someone's Dying Tears	1:23
10.	Intruders	1:35
11.	Backstabber	2:16
12.	Finbar's Theme	2:11
13.	Dreaming of California	1:52
14.	Death Stare	1:56
15.	In the Land of Sinners	2:44
16.	Over the Ocean	2:47
17.	On a Mission	2:54
18.	Something Unforgivable	2:14
19.	Lullaby of Gleann Cholm Cille	2:28
20.	Doireann's Gun	1:41
21.	Four Foot Deep	1:48
22.	Ever Since Margaret Died	2:01
23.	Runaway	1:35
24.	A Lifetime of Poor Choices	0:48
25.	The Grand Showdown	2:38
26.	This Land	4:31

== Release ==
The film premiered at the 80th Venice International Film Festival on 6 September 2023. In April 2022, Netflix revealed to have pre-bought the film's distribution rights in the United Kingdom and Republic of Ireland. The film was released in limited theaters in the US on 29 March 2024, by Samuel Goldwyn Films. The film was released on Netflix in Ireland and the UK on 26 April 2024.

== Reception ==
=== Box office ===
The film made $1.1 million from 896 theaters in the US on its opening weekend.

=== Critical response ===
On the review aggregator website Rotten Tomatoes, 83% of 80 critics' reviews are positive, with an average rating of 6.6/10. The website's consensus reads: "Well-written and classically constructed, In the Land of Saints and Sinners is one of the better action thrillers Liam Neeson's made in recent years." Metacritic, which uses a weighted average, assigned the film a score of 60 out of 100, based on 14 critics, indicating "mixed or average" reviews.

According to the Belfast Telegraph, the film received mixed reviews from critics. Empire gave the film three out of five stars and concluded in its review that "while it isn’t especially insightful on Irish history, it makes the most of its setting, with the usual scenery — windswept clifftops, dry stone walls, rolling fields — bolstered by some strong performances. It’s a treat to see actors like Colm Meaney, Ciarán Hinds and Kerry Condon take time off their usual gigs as American-accented characters to return to home turf. In an unexpected highlight, Jack Gleeson — nearly unrecognisable from his time on the Iron Throne as Joffrey Baratheon — puts in a delightfully slimy turn as Finbarr’s gangster mentee. And at the centre of it all is Neeson, still as rugged and dependable as rock, still able to elevate this sort of material while making it look effortless."

The Irish Times awarded the film three out of five stars and referred to it as "a parade of wasted ideas and characters." Variety opined that "Saints and Sinners doesn’t pretend that it won’t end in bloodshed. The feature finds its essential tension in its approach to Neeson’s on-screen image — here, playing a gentle elder embedded in a quiet town, but also unforgettably an actor that has buttered his bread shooting up criminal henchmen for nearly two decades now."

The Hollywood Reporter claimed that the film was "overwritten, overripe and likely destined to be streaming fodder." The Financial Times remarked positively that "mostly the film passes though the gears with smooth efficiency. Neeson is as sturdy as ever in a role Clint Eastwood might have played 20 years ago and a few thousand miles away... And Condon excels, giving a stock character a shudder of intensity and three dimensions. Neeson wants to make more interesting movies. Condon already seems to have stepped in from one."
