= Nora Baldenweg =

Swiss/Australian female composer

- Born: 22 July 1981 (age 45); Switzerland
- Genres: Music in advertising; film score
- Occupations: Musician, vocalist, composer, producer, fashion editor and creative director
- Label: GREAT GARBO music
- Website: greatgarbo.com, norabaldenweg.com

Nora Baldenweg (born 22 July 1981) is a Swiss Australian musician, vocalist, composer, producer and creative director in fashion. She was the first Swiss female composer to be nominated for the World Soundtrack Awards (Public Choice).

She is a member of the World Soundtrack Academy and the European Film Academy.

== Career ==
Baldenweg has been working as a composer, producer and co-founded the music production company GREAT GARBO in 2004. She has composed music for over 300 advertising commercials for brands like Sony, Mastercard, Dove (one of the most viewed online ads of all time) and 20 fictional films and TV series.

Many of her most famous works were produced in the context of the trio Diego Baldenweg with Nora Baldenweg and Lionel Baldenweg, comprising herself and her two brothers Diego Baldenweg and Lionel Baldenweg.

Besides her career in music, Baldenweg simultaneously held positions in fashion publishing as editor-at-large/Paris director (Russh), editor-at-large/Paris director/senior editor (Indie), editor-at-large/fashion features director (Material Girl) and was a contributing writer for Vogue Taiwan, Nylon, Dazed Digital and Wallpaper In May 2014 she relaunched the Paris-based magazine Modzik as editor-in-chief. In May 2017 she became editor-in-chief of UK-based magazine Lula. Since 2017 she works as a creative director (fashion) for various brands.

=== Film scores ===
Baldenweg's career in film music has spanned 17 years and her film scores include:

- La femme et le TGV (2016), a Swiss French-language short film directed by Timo von Gunten, starring Jane Birkin.
- The Little Witch (2018 film) (2018), a German fantasy film based on the bestselling children's book by Otfried Preußler and directed by Michael Schaerer, starring Karoline Herfurth.
- Head Full of Honey (2018), an American remake of the 2014 German film of the same name directed by Til Schweiger, starring Nick Nolte, Matt Dillon & Emily Mortimer.
- The Reformer Zwingli (2019), a Swiss biopic drama about Huldrych Zwingli directed by Stefan Haupt, starring Max Simonischek.

Her TV music includes:

- Scores for all episodes of The Unlisted produced by Polly Staniford and Angie Fielder and Itch (TV series) based on the books written by Simon Mayo.

=== Awards ===
In addition to Baldenweg's Swiss Film Academy Award for The Little Witch, she has received a number of awards and nominations.

- 2006 – Winner (as a member of GREAT GARBO) «Best Music» EDI Awards (Federal Department of Home Affairs) – "KUONI"
- 2006 – Winner (as a member of GREAT GARBO) «Best Music» EDI Awards (Federal Department of Home Affairs) – "Love Life – Stop Aids (Federal Office of Public Health)"
- 2010 – Winner «Best Film Music» Suisa Prize Locarno International Film Festival – "180°"
- 2018 – Finalist «Best Feature Film Score» Music + Sound Awards (International) - "The Final Touch / Die letzte Pointe"
- 2018 – Winner «Best Film Music» Swiss Film Award – "The Little Witch / Die kleine Hexe"
- 2019 – Nomination «Best Score of the Year» (Public Choice) World Soundtrack Awards – "The Reformer Zwingli"
- 2019 – Nomination «Best Original Music in TV» Australian Academy Award – AACTA – "The Unlisted"
- 2020 – Nomination «Score of the Year» Movie Music UK Awards – "The Reformer Zwingli"
- 2020 – Nomination «Best Original Music in TV» Australian Academy Award – AACTA – "Itch (TV series)"
- 2021 – Winner «ADC Bronze for Best Music» Art Directors Club Switzerland – "Swiss Film Award"
- 2021 – Finalist «Best Original Composition in Branding» Music + Sound Awards (International) - "Swiss Film Award"
- 2021 – Winner «Prix de la Meilleure Musique Originale» Festival International du Film Indépendant de Bordeaux, France – "The Life Underground"
- 2021 – Winner «Composer of the Year - Outstanding Achievements in Film Music» 46th Prix Walo

== Discography ==
- Rascals on the Road / Mein Name ist Eugen Original Motion Picture Soundtrack (SonyBMG, 2006)
- 180° Original Motion Picture Soundtrack (Great Garbo / Praesens 2010) (collaboration with David Zinman and the Tonhalle-Orchester Zürich)
- Summer Outside Original Motion Picture Soundtrack (Great Garbo, 2013)
- La Femme et le TGV Original Motion Picture Soundtrack (Great Garbo, 2016)
- Die Letzte Pointe Original Motion Picture Soundtrack (Swiss Treasure Recordings / Great Garbo, 2017) (collaboration with Pepe Lienhard)
- The Little Witch Original Motion Picture Soundtrack (Kobrow / Great Garbo / Rambling, 2018)
- The Reformer Zwingli Original Motion Picture Soundtrack (Great Garbo, 2019) (collaboration with Daniel Hope and the Zurich Chamber Orchestra)
- The Unlisted Original TV Series Soundtrack featuring a remake of Pink Floyd's Another Brick in the Wall (Great Garbo, 2019)

== See also ==
- Diego Baldenweg with Nora Baldenweg and Lionel Baldenweg
  - Diego Baldenweg
  - Lionel Vincent Baldenweg
