= Tristram Baumber =

Australian comedy writer

- Born: Canberra, Australia
- Education: University of Wollongong
- Occupation: Comedy writer
- Years active: 2011–present

Tristram Baumber is an Australian writer known for creating television shows such as The PM's Daughter, Timothy, and The Cleanists, as well as writing for a number of other Australian television programs.

== Early life and education ==
Tristram Baumber studied English and creative writing at the University of Wollongong.

== Career ==
Baumber created the TV political comedy drama series The PM's Daughter, the telemovie Timothy and the sitcom The Cleanists.

Baumber's short comedy plays have been performed in various countries as part of the Short + Sweet festival.

== Awards and recognition ==
Baumber was nominated for the 2025 Australian Writers' Guild Awards in the Comedy category for Mother and Son.

== Writing credits ==
- Site Unseen (2026)
- Mother and Son on ABC Television (2023–2024)
- The PM's Daughter on ABC Television (2022)
- Born to Spy on ABC Television (2021)
- The Other Guy (series 2) on Stan (2019)
- The Unlisted on ABC Television and Netflix (2019)
- Timothy on ABC Television (2014)
- The Cleanists on Showcase TV (2013–2014)
- Wednesday Night Fever on ABC Television (2013)
- Spaceman & Executioner as part of Short + Sweet theatre festival (2013–2014)
- Wisdom Of Solomon as part of Short + Sweet theatre festival (2012)
