= The Safe House (film) =

2025 French comedy drama film by Lionel Baier

- French: La cache
- Directed by: Lionel Baier
- Screenplay by: Lionel Baier; Catherine Charrier
- Story by: Christophe Boltanski
- Based on: La cache by Christophe Boltanski
- Produced by: Agnieszka Ramu
- Starring: Michel Blanc; Dominique Reymond
- Cinematography: Patrick Lindenmaier
- Edited by: Pauline Gaillard
- Music by: Diego Baldenweg; Nora Baldenweg; Lionel Baldenweg
- Production companies: Bande à part Films; Red Lion; Les Films du Poisson; RTS Radio Télévision Suisse; SRG SSR
- Distributed by: Les Films du Losange (France); Pathé Films AG (Switzerland)
- Release dates: 20 February 2025 (Berlinale); 19 March 2025 (France)
- Running time: 88 minutes
- Countries: Switzerland; Luxembourg; France
- Language: French

The Safe House (French: La cache) is a 2025 comedy-drama film written by Lionel Baier and Catherine Charrier, directed by Baier and starring Michel Blanc and Dominique Reymond. Adapted from La Cache by Christophe Boltanski, the film follows nine-year-old boy, who lived through the events of May 1968 hidden away at his grandparents' house, surrounded by his uncles and great-grandmother.

The international co-production between Switzerland, Luxembourg and France was selected in the Competition at the 75th Berlin International Film Festival, where it competed for the Golden Bear and had first screening on 20 February 2025 at Berlinale Palast.

== Synopsis ==
Amid the upheaval of Paris in May 1968, a 9-year-old boy Christophe, is thrilled to spend more time with his grandparents in their beloved apartment. He delights in the lively presence of his artistic and intellectual uncles and their spirited great-grandmother from Odesa. While his parents join the historic protests, the family confronts their history when an esteemed guest seeks shelter in their home.

== Cast ==
- Dominique Reymond as Grandmother
- Michel Blanc as Père-Grand, Grandfather
- William Lebghil as Great Uncle
- Aurélien Gabrielli as Little Uncle
- Liliane Rovère as Hinterland
- Adrien Barazzone as father
- Ethan Chimienti as the boy
- Larisa Faber as mother
- Gilles Privat

== Production ==
The film produced by Bande à Part Films, Red Lion, Les Films du Poisson, RTS - Radio Télévision Suisse, SRG SSR is distributed by Pathé Films AG, Les Films du Losange.

== Release ==
The Safe House had its world premiere on 20 February 2025, as part of the 75th Berlin International Film Festival, in Competition. It was showcased in the official selection Out of competition at the Luxembourg City Film Festival on 15 March, 2025.

The film was released in the French cinemas on 19 March 2025 by The Diamond Films.

In January 2025, France’s mk2 Films acquired the international sales rights of the film.

It was screened at the 78th Locarno Film Festival on 12 August 2025 in Swiss Panorama section.

The film was shortlisted alongwith other two films as the Switzerland‘s Oscar submission for 98th Academy Awards.

== Reception ==
On the AlloCiné, which lists 35 press reviews, the film obtained an average rating of 3.6/5.

== Accolades ==
Award	Date of ceremony	Category	Recipient	Result	Ref.
Berlin International Film Festival	23 February 2025	Golden Bear	The Safe House	Nominated	

== See also ==
- List of Swiss submissions for the Academy Award for Best International Feature Film
