= Kylah Day =

Australian actress and model

- Born: Kylah Jaymee Day c. 1998; Australia
- Occupations: Actress; model
- Years active: 2018–present

Kylah Jaymee Day (born c. 1998) is an Australian actress and fashion model.

== Early life and education ==
Kylah Jaymee Day is an Indigenous Australian woman of Noongar, Hungarian, and Montenegrin descent.

She attended Lilydale High School, in the outer Melbourne suburb of Lilydale. When in year 12, she won joint first place in a photography competition in July 2020 and the Principal's Choice Award in the school's October Arts Competition.

== Career ==
While still a high school student in 2015, she was signed up with IMG Models Australia when she auditioned for Australia's Next Top Model. By the age of 20 she was a successful model, appearing in the 2018 Melbourne Fashion Week, and she continues to do modelling as of 2024. She has also worked as a singer and dancer.

In 2020 she played Lucy in the 10-part ABC children's adventure series Itch, directed by Renée Webster and Nicholas Verso and filmed in Western Australia.

In August 2022, Day made her stage debut as Cass, opposite Lisa Maza in Canberra playwright Dylan Van Den Berg's play Ngadjung, commissioned by the Belconnen Arts Centre and co-directed by Rachael Maza.

In 2023 she played Jill Manderson in two episodes of the Stan drama Scrublands.

Day plays Sharnie Kennedy in the 2024 Netflix drama series Territory.

== Filmography ==
=== Television ===
- Itch (2020–2021), Lucy – 20 episodes
- Crazy Fun Park (2023), Perky Influencer – Episode: "My Name is"
- Scrublands (2023), Jill – 2 episodes
- Territory (2024), Sharnie Kennedy – 6 episodes
