= The Cleanists =

Australian TV series

- Genre: Comedy; Sitcom
- Created by: Tristram Baumber
- Directed by: Tristram Baumber
- Starring: James Chapman; Shanon Kulupach; Gabriella Stevens; Craig Lindeman
- Theme music composer: Ergo Phizmiz
- Opening theme: "Orpheus Tickled"
- Country of origin: Australia
- No. of seasons: 2
- No. of episodes: 20

Production
- Producer: Tristram Baumber
- Running time: 5 minutes
- Production company: Bocanegra Etc.

Original release
- Network: Showcase TV
- Release: 8 December 2013 – present

The Cleanists is a short-form Australian comedy television and web series created by Tristram Baumber that premiered on 8 December 2013 on Showcase TV in the United Kingdom. The series follows four partners in a house-cleaning company as they face various crises and embark on surreal adventures.

== Plot ==
Each five-minute episode of The Cleanists brings a new house to clean and a new and bizarre adventure for the characters to navigate. The dramatic centre of the show is everyman Gregg’s struggle to work with insane business partners Magda and Philip. The main emotional focus of the series is an ongoing love triangle between Philip, Gregg and Gregg’s long-time friend Libby.

== Characters ==
- Gregg (James Chapman) – Long-suffering protagonist of the series. Gregg hates working with Magda and Philip, but his long-standing feelings for Libby mean he’s trapped working with The Cleanists as long as she is.
- Libby (Shanon Kulupach) – Sunny and good-natured 'girl next door' who becomes increasingly involved with Philip and doesn't seem to notice his eccentricities.
- Magda (Gabriella Stevens) – Believes herself to be the boss of The Cleanists, despite all evidence it’s an equal partnership. Magda is ambitious, focused and not above trapping her workmates in confined spaces if there’s a good business reason for doing so.
- Philip (Craig Lindeman) – Wildcard of the group and resident weirdo. Philip attempts to psychologically destroy his male co-worker, Gregg, and has designs on Libby.

== Development ==
=== Concept and creation ===
The series is created by Tristram Baumber and was developed out of an early pilot called Ultra Clean. Baumber penned the ten scripts and then held auditions in Newcastle, New South Wales to find the actors who would bring his characters to life.

=== Production ===
The ten episodes of the first season were filmed in and around Newcastle in June 2013. The cast and crew worked long days and were able to shoot at a rate of two episodes per day. Baumber, who directed all ten episodes, said of the shoot " It all came down to planning the schedules meticulously in advance. We overran our schedules slightly every day, but at least that meant finishing by 6pm, rather than 11pm."

=== Cast ===
The four main cast members appear in every episode of The Cleanists. The first season features guest appearances from Anne Rzechowicz as a tax officer, Peter Oliver as an annoying client, Corinne Lavis as a government safety inspector, Owen Sparnon and Diley Alanca as homicide detectives and Duncan Gordon as a mysterious "ghoulish figure".

== Episodes ==
=== Season 1 (2013) ===
No.	Title	Directed by	Written by	Original release date
1	"Trial Day"	Tristram Baumber	Tristram Baumber	8 December 2013
Gregg and Libby embark on the trial day from hell with Philip and Magda.
2	"No News"	Tristram Baumber	Tristram Baumber	15 December 2013
Magda is determined to get The Cleanists into the newspaper, by any means necessary. (Guest starring Anne Rzechowicz)
3	"Mr Aspen"	Tristram Baumber	Tristram Baumber	22 December 2013
The team desperately schemes to get an irritating client out of his own house. (Guest starring Peter Oliver)
4	"Summer Madness"	Tristram Baumber	Tristram Baumber	29 December 2013
A deranged battle of wills centres on a client's irresistible swimming pool.
5	"Occupational Health, Lies & Safety"	Tristram Baumber	Tristram Baumber	26 January 2014
The team attempts to achieve a perfect government safety score. (Guest starring Corinne Lavis)
6	"Political Animals"	Tristram Baumber	Tristram Baumber	9 March 2014
The Cleanists butt heads over how to exert their new-found political influence with the mayor's son.
7	"The Friendship Box"	Tristram Baumber	Tristram Baumber	16 March 2014
When Gregg and Libby are separated from Magda and Philip by a magician's mysterious box, it may be just the romantic opportunity Gregg needs.
8	"CSI: Cleaning Services Incorporated"	Tristram Baumber	Tristram Baumber & James Chapman	23 March 2014
The Cleanists inadvertently destroy a major crime scene and must cover their tracks. (Guest starring Owen Sparnon and Diley Alanca)
9	"The Ghoul"	Tristram Baumber	Tristram Baumber	30 March 2014
Gregg and Philip set out to rescue Libby from a (sort of) ghoul. (Guest starring Duncan Gordon)
10	"Last Day"	Tristram Baumber	Tristram Baumber	13 April 2014
Libby rocks the team to its core when she announces her intention to leave The Cleanists.

=== Season 2 (2014) ===
No. overall	No. in series	Title	Directed by	Written by	Original release date
11	1	"hotcleanerparty.com"	Tristram Baumber	Tristram Baumber	14 December 2014
The Cleanists discover they are being watched by an online fetish website.
12	2	"Road House"	Tristram Baumber	Tristram Baumber	14 December 2014
The team are cleaning a house on the back of a moving truck as it travels across Australia.
13	3	"Divorce Is Always Hardest On The Cleaners"	Tristram Baumber	Tristram Baumber	14 December 2014
Magda and Libby team up against Philip and a reluctant Gregg, as The Cleanists divide a divorcing couple's belongings.
14	4	"Fairytale Girls"	Tristram Baumber	Tristram Baumber	14 December 2014
Libby struggles with her sense of self in a fairytale-themed house, while Gregg introduces his new girlfriend. (Guest starring Lauren Steggles)
15	5	"Club House"	Tristram Baumber	Tristram Baumber	14 December 2014
Magda falls head over heels for Libby's hot psychiatrist in a house that pumps non-stop dance music. (Guest starring Carl Young)
16	6	"CompuDoor"	Tristram Baumber	Tristram Baumber	14 December 2014
Philip matches wits with an electronic door system, as he tries to help Libby solve a mystery. (Guest starring Belinda Hodgson)
17	7	"The Ageists"	Tristram Baumber	Tristram Baumber	14 December 2014
The Cleanists take a moment to consider what their future lives will be like.
18	8	"Bonus Episode"	Tristram Baumber	Tristram Baumber	14 December 2014
Magda introduces a bonus system, using her own funds and an unstable electronic currency.
19	9	"Quirky Threads"	Tristram Baumber	Tristram Baumber	14 December 2014
Libby reaches a psychic cross-roads as the team cleans Gregg's girlfriend's house. (Guest starring Lauren Steggles)
20	10	"Last Day II: 2 Last 2 Furious"	Tristram Baumber	Tristram Baumber	14 December 2014
Gregg struggles in his relationship with Libby, while Philip makes a stunning revelation. (Guest starring Hannah Bath)

== Release and reception ==
=== Online distribution ===
All ten episodes of The Cleanists season 1 debuted on the official Cleanists Channel on YouTube on 3 December 2013. The series was made available globally, with no regional lockout. The crowdfunded Season 2 debuted on YouTube on 14 December 2014.

=== Television broadcast ===
The first season of The Cleanists premiered on 8 December 2013 on UK broadcaster Showcase TV. Creator Baumber said of the broadcast "Getting the green light from Showcase TV in the UK was huge for us. We’re very excited about people across Great Britain and Ireland seeing our show. It just goes to demonstrate how truly global the TV business is now." The entire first season was aired in compendium form by Showcase, with repeat broadcasts following. The second season began airing in early 2015, following the same format.

=== Critical reception ===
The Cleanists was web TV aggregator SideReel's "Featured Series" in December 2013. SideReel's Leah Friedman said of the series "Think It’s Always Sunny crossed with the sweetness of Flight of the Conchords, but with Australian accents." Sam Gutelle from Tubefilter said "By the second episode, multiple plots twist out of each house visit, with ten installments representing the series’ complete run. Ultimately, there are few web comedies of higher quality; The Cleanists‘ execution is fittingly tidy."

Splitsider's Luke Kelly-Clyne gave the show a positive review, saying "Creating a series concept that’s repeatable, low-cost, and interesting is like solving a complex math equation. Baumber Good Will Hunting’d the shit out of this web chalkboard." Snobby Robot's Chris Hadley was similarly positive: "In addition to the hilarious stories in each episode, THE CLEANISTS features great characters that will also keep viewers coming back for more; characters that viewers will get to know and understand as each episode progresses."
