= The PM's Daughter =

2022–present Australian TV series

- Genre: Family; Comedy-drama
- Created by: Tristram Baumber; Matthew Allred
- Written by: Tristram Baumber; Lou Sanz; Hannah Samuel; Angela McDonald; Craig Irvin; Gemma Bird Matheson; Magda Wozniak
- Directed by: Julietta Boscolo; Erin White; Alana Hicks
- Starring: Cassandra Helmot; Natalie English; Nya Cofie
- Country of origin: Australia
- Original language: English
- No. of seasons: 2
- No. of episodes: 20

Production
- Executive producers: Chris Oliver-Taylor; Tristram Baumber
- Producers: Alice Willison; Kieran Hoyle
- Camera setup: Multi-camera
- Running time: 26 minutes
- Production company: Fremantle Australia

Original release
- Network: ABC Me
- Release: 1 January 2022 – present

The PM's Daughter is an Australian political comedy drama television series aimed at children and teenagers. It premiered on ABC Me on 1 January 2022.

== Cast ==
- Cassandra Helmot as Cat Parkes Pérez
- Natalie English as Sadie
- Jaga Yap as Ollie
- Nya Cofie as Miro
- Amelie James-Power as Georgina
- Claire Fearon as Prime Minister Isabel Pérez
- Anthony Brandon Wong as Deputy Prime Minister Tim Yeung
- Gemma Bird Matheson as Yvette
- Renee Lim as Deputy Principal Tan
- Maximilian Mulvenney as Jared
- Indiana Kwong as Grace
- Amelie James Power as Georgina
- Lewis Fitz-Gerald as Henry
- Cecilia Yeoman as Jacinta
- Sebastian Alanis Alvarez as Tom
- Dinitha Senevirathne as Eric
- Mantshologane Maile as Murphy
- Michael Beckley as Carl

== Production ==
The series was filmed in July 2021 in various locations in Sydney and Canberra, including Brockby Lodge in Strathfield, the former home of Harold Arnott (1888–1971) of Arnott's Biscuits fame. The house is used as the exterior location of the Prime Minister of Australia's residence The Lodge. A Victorian style home is used as the interior of the PM's house.

The second series was also filmed in Sydney with some scenes filmed in Canberra, and aired on the 12th of June 2023 on ABC Me and ABC iview.
