= The Unlisted =

2019 Australian drama television series

- Genre: Science fiction; Drama
- Created by: Justine Flynn
- Written by: Mithila Gupta; Timothy Lee; Tristram Baumber; Chris Kunz; Greg Waters; Jane Allen; Rhys Graham; Nicholas Brown; Natesha Somasundaram
- Directed by: Rhys Graham; Justine Flynn; Neil Sharma; Nicholas Verso; Lucy Gaffy; Rebecca O'Brien
- Starring: Ved Rao; Vrund Rao; Miah Madden; Abigail Adriano; Nya Cofie; Jean Hinchliffe
- Opening theme: "Another Brick in the Wall" by Diego Baldenweg with Nora Baldenweg and Lionel Baldenweg
- Composers: Diego Baldenweg; Nora Baldenweg; Lionel Baldenweg
- Country of origin: Australia
- Original language: English
- No. of seasons: 1
- No. of episodes: 15

Production
- Executive producers: Justine Flynn; Libbie Doherty; Carla de Jong
- Producers: Polly Staniford; Angie Fielder; Aquarius Films
- Camera setup: Single-camera
- Running time: 23–25 minutes
- Production companies: Aquarius Films; Buster Productions; Australian Broadcasting Corporation

Original release
- Network: ABC Me
- Release: 15 September 2019

The Unlisted is an Australian children's science fiction drama television series. The series follows the story of 13-year-old identical twins, Drupad Sharma and Kalpen Sharma, who work with a group of underground vigilante children, who call themselves "The Unlisted", in order to stop a powerful corporation from imposing global control over the world's youth by inserting a tracking device, which also allows them to be remotely controlled.

The Unlisted is produced by Polly Staniford and Angie Fielder. It is executive produced by Justine Flynn, Libbie Doherty, and Carla De Jong. The creator and showrunner is Justine Flynn. The series is directed by Rhys Graham, Justine Flynn, Neil Sharma, Nicholas Verso, Lucy Gaffy, and Rebecca O’Brien. It was written by Mithila Gupta, Timothy Lee, Tristram Baumber, Chris Kunz, Greg Waters, Jane Allen, Rhys Graham, Nicholas Brown, and Natesha Somasundaram. It is an Aquarius Films production. Netflix has acquired global rights outside Australia. As of November 2025, the series has neither been officially canceled by ABC Me, nor renewed for a second season.

== Premise ==
The show follows thirteen-year-old identical twins who discover that a corporation, in cohort with the government, is secretly tracking and manipulating Australia's youth. It is being done via electronic tracking devices that are installed during a 'routine' dental exam, under the name of Global Child Initiative Programme. When the duo discovers that the programme is all a sham, they pair up with a group of underground vigilantes, who call themselves as 'The Unlisted', to stop the powerful and evil corporation from gaining control over the world's youth. They must stop the wicked authorities from creating an army of young soldiers who can be manipulated to serve the wealthiest of society.

== Cast and characters ==
=== Main ===
- Ved Rao as Kalpen "Kal" Sharma: a teenage boy attending middle school who is the twin brother of Drupad "Dru" Sharma; he took his brother's place in a 'dental appointment' at school, and ended up with two implants. He and Dru discover a deadly secret about the Global Child Initiative and have to work together to take them down before all is lost. Though Kal may not be as intelligent as Dru, he is very athletic and strategic. Kal is also shown to be extremely brave and loyal. However, after Kal gets implanted, his personality slowly begins to change as he starts to become manipulated by Infinity Group and Regan, losing his emotions for people. Because Kal got two implants, he gained double the ability compared to his classmates.
- Vrund Rao as Drupad "Dru" Sharma: twin brother of Kalpen Sharma. He is also a lakepouint like his brother and he is very intelligent. He knows how to code. When Kymara hides a secret message within her video to find other Unlisted kids he quickly figures it out using dark web. Because of his fears of dentists, he asked his brother to go in his place and due to that he has not been implanted so he lacks certain enhanced abilities that his brother and other classmates have.
- Miah Madden as Kymara Russell: a vlog streamer who likes posting gaming content for all her viewers. She is also a part of "The Unlisted". Due to her being famous, the other members of The Unlisted force her to hide back during certain plans and bring her to meet a kid named Aaron at a location hidden from the Infinity Group. Dru is also shown to be a fan of hers.
- Abigail Adriano as Rose Aquino: an Asian girl who is one of the Unlisted children that work together with twins Kal and Dru Sharma to take down the Global Child Initiative and put an end to their evil plans.
- Nya Cofie as Jacob Annan: a teenager who is one of the Unlisted children until he and his group. He is a very big fan of soccer and supports the same team as Kal. He got an infection after Kal beat him when he, along with other Unlisted children attacked Dru fearing the brothers may have been sent by the Infinity Group and had to be treated by Aunt Maya.
- Jean Hinchliffe as Gemma Khouri: a very kind and brave girl who grew up on a farm and cares a lot about her friends and others. She is also a part of the Unlisted because she was not implanted due to her having to help out at her father's farm.
- Zachary Wan as Jiao: a smart Chinese exchange student. He didn't take the implant and instead wears it in a pendant on his necklace so that the Global Child Initiative can't find him. Jiao first appears in Episode Six and appeared as an ally to the Unlisted as he is Unlisted himself. He stayed in Dru and Kal's house.
- Kate Box as Emma Ainsworth: one of the main antagonists and leader of the Australian branch of the Infinity Group. She was also the leader of the Australian branch of the Global Child Initiative, an umbrella company of the Infinity Group.

=== Recurring ===
- Saba Zaidi Abdi as Kal and Dru's dadi (grandmother): head of the Sharma family who values Indian Traditions.
- Avishma Lohith as Vidya Sharma: older sister of Dru and Kal.
- Annabel Wolfe as Regan Holcroft: classmate of the Sharma brothers who also got implanted.
- Aria Ferris as Chloe: friend and neighbour of the Sharma brothers who is also implanted.
- Otis Dhanji as Tim Hale: friend of Kal Sharma and the first victim to refuse the implantation.
- Virginie Laverdure as Anousha Sharma: mother of Dru and Kal.
- Nicholas Brown as Rahul Sharma: father of Dru and Kal and a bakery owner.
- Zenia Starr as Dr. Maya Sharma: Kal and Dru's bua (aunt) .

== Episodes ==
| Series | Episodes | Originally released |
|---|---|---|
| 1 | 15 | 15 October 2019 |

=== Season 1 (2019) ===
| Episode NO. | Episode name | Original airdate |
|---|---|---|
| 1 | Episode 1 | 15 September 2019 |
Dru escapes a dreaded dental check-up by convincing Kal to take his place. Later, strange things start happening as the family celebrates Diwali.
| 2 | Episode 2 | 15 September 2019 |
After Dru struggles to keep up with other kids during a fitness test, he hacks into the school's computer system and makes a startling discovery.
| 3 | Episode 3 | 15 September 2019 |
When Dadi volunteers at a school event, Kal must keep his incredible strength under wraps. But Vidya suspects that her brothers are hiding something.
| 4 | Episode 4 | 15 September 2019 |
Dru and Kal join forces with the unlisted, runaway kids who escaped the Infinity Group. But a crisis threatens to expose them all.
| 5 | Episode 5 | 15 September 2019 |
When workers discover the tunnel, the unlisted are forced to flee.Meanwhile, the twins reunite with a friend—but something seems off.
| 6 | Episode 6 | 15 September 2019 |
Social media influencer Kymara posts a video containing a secret message to her followers.But she makes a mistake that puts the unlisted at risk.
| 7 | Episode 7 | 15 September 2019 |
Dru and Kal weigh whether they can trust Jiao. The students take a field trip to GCI headquarters, where a scavenger hunt test their abilities.
| 8 | Episode 8 | 15 September 2019 |
Horrified by the incident at GCI headquarters, the twins confide in Aunt Bua. A new teacher replaces Miss Biggs and divides the students into groups.
| 9 | Episode 9 | 15 September 2019 |
With GCI drones swarming all around, Rose and Gemma make a risky plan to meet another unlisted kid. Kal's Elite status starts to go to his head.
| 10 | Episode 10 | 15 September 2019 |
Emma Ainsworth, the CEO of the Infinity Group, interrogates Rose and Mack. As Kal grows closer to Regan, Dru wonders which side his brother's really on.
| 11 | Episode 11 | 15 September 2019 |
GCI Trains a new crop of students with special abilities. With an epic storm looming, the twins plot an elaborate rescue.
| 12 | Episode 12 | 15 September 2019 |
As the hunt for the missing kids heats up, the unlisted hides out at the Sharmas' house, where Jacob stumbles across a secret.
| 13 | Episode 13 | 15 September 2019 |
While Emma Ainsworth subjects the elite to a harrowing training, Dru works with the unlisted to take down the GCI mainframe.
| 14 | Episode 14 | 15 September 2019 |
The Unlisted film a manifesto and take to the streets to spread their message. Meanwhile, the Infinity Group sends Kal after Dru.
| 15 | Episode 15 | 15 September 2019 |
During the Global Child Congress, Dadi helps the unlisted break into GCI headquarters, where Kal faces the ultimate decision.

== Reception ==
=== Critical response ===
The first season has received generally positive reviews, with praise for the directing, fast-paced story, visuals and themes. Ruth Prarthana of Deccan Chronicle praised The Unlisted giving it a 4 out of 5, stating that, "The Unlisted works because it offers only 15 episodes that capture the narrative in fast-paced manner with no needless drama." Ayize Everett of Common Sense Media asserts that, "This Australian drama is fairly light and fun, despite the overtones of menace."

Writing for Decider, John Serba praised some aspects of the series including the theme song but was concerned about the performance of actors, writing, "It seems to be fishing around for a consistent tone ... Its modest stabs at comedy fall flat, and the serious moments fall prey to stiff dialogue and performances".

=== Accolades ===
| Year | Association | Category | Nominee(s) | Result | Ref. |
|---|---|---|---|---|---|
| 2019 | AACTA Awards | Best Children's Television Series | The Unlisted | Nominated | |
| 2019 | AACTA Awards | Best Original Music Score in Television | Diego Baldenweg; Nora Baldenweg; Lionel Baldenweg | Nominated | |
| 2019 | AACTA Awards | Best Editing in Television | Mat Evans | Nominated | |
| 2019 | Casting Guild of Australia | Achievement in Casting | Gemma Brown and Kirsty McGregor | Won | |
| 2020 | Australian Directors' Guild | Best Direction of a Children's TV or SVOD Drama Program | Rebecca O'Brien and Lucy Gaffy | Nominated | |
| 2020 | International Youth Jury Prize | World's best fiction program for 11-15-year-olds | The Unlisted | Won | |
| 2020 | TBI Content Innovation Awards | Best Live Action Kids Programme | Aquarius Films | Nominated | |

== Soundtrack ==
The Unlisted (Original Music from the ABC/Netflix Series)

Soundtrack album by Diego Baldenweg with Nora Baldenweg and Lionel Baldenweg
- Released: 15 September 2019
- Genre: Progressive rock
- Length: 65:00
- Label: Great Garbo Music
- Producers: ABC Me; Netflix

Singles from The Unlisted
- 1. "Another Brick In The Wall" Released: 15 September 2019

=== Track listing ===
The Unlisted (Original Music from the ABC/Netflix Series)
| No. | Title | Length |
|---|---|---|
| 1. | "The Unlisted: Main Theme" | 2:25 |
| 2. | "The Elite" | 2:32 |
| 3. | "Drops" | 2:51 |
| 4. | "Rebellion" | 2:32 |
| 5. | "Succeed" | 3:14 |
| 6. | "The Underworld" | 2:57 |
| 7. | "Sunrise over Woolloomooloo" | 2:15 |
| 8. | "Another Brick In The Wall" | 2:35 |
| 9. | "Investigations" | 3:13 |
| 10. | "Under the Trees" | 1:57 |
| 11. | "Everybody Is Frozen" | 2:01 |
| 12. | "Surveillance" | 4:28 |
| 13. | "As the Story Unfolds" | 2:53 |
| 14. | "Stronger" | 2:18 |
| 15. | "Escape the City" | 2:36 |
| 16. | "Thunder" | 5:10 |
| 17. | "Science Experiments" | 3:00 |
| 18. | "Midnight" | 3:00 |
| 19. | "Wires" | 4:28 |
| 20. | "The Establishment" | 3:00 |
| 21. | "Dentist" | 2:12 |
| 22. | "Womb" | 2:54 |
