= Mother and Son (2023 TV series) =

Australian TV series

- Opening intertitle for the first episode
- Genre: Sitcom
- Created by: Geoffrey Atherden; Matt Okine
- Based on: Mother and Son by Geoffrey Atherden
- Written by: Matt Okine; Sarah Walker; Tristram Baumber; Tim Spencer
- Directed by: Neil Sharma; Kriv Stenders; Shaun Wilson
- Starring: Matt Okine; Denise Scott; Angela Nica Sullen
- Composers: Jordie Lane; Clare Reynolds
- Country of origin: Australia
- Original language: English
- No. of series: 2
- No. of episodes: 14

Production
- Executive producers: Jude Troy; Richard Finlayson; Matt Okine; Todd Abbott; Louise Smith; Geoffrey Atherden
- Producers: Jude Troy; Alexandra Cameron
- Production location: Sydney
- Cinematography: Drew English; Matthew Temple
- Editor: Gabriel Dowrick
- Camera setup: Single-camera
- Running time: 30 minutes
- Production company: Wooden Horse

Original release
- Network: ABC
- Release: 23 August 2023 – present

Related
- Mother and Son

Mother and Son is an Australian television sitcom reboot of the series of the same name broadcast on the Australian Broadcasting Corporation (ABC) since 23 August 2023. The series stars Denise Scott and Matt Okine as Maggie and Arthur, respectively.

Filming for the series began in Sydney in March 2023. Unlike the original series which filmed on a sound stage with a multi-camera setup with an audience, the series is filmed as a single-camera setup.

== Plot ==
Following a breakup from his long-suffering girlfriend, Arthur puts his future on hold to move back home with his widowed mother, Maggie. Arthur and his older sister, Robbie, attempt to care for Maggie, who may recently have almost burnt down the kitchen, but still runs circles around her children.

== Cast ==
- Matt Okine as Arthur Boye
- Denise Scott as Maggie Boye
- Angela Nica Sullen as Robbie
- Virginia Gay as Liz
- Catherine Văn-Davies as Maya
- Blaiyze Barksdale as Keelan
- Zara Tate as Melody
- Andrea Demetriades as Dee
- Ferdinand Hoang as Tony

== Production ==
=== Development ===
The series is a "fresh reimagining" of the original sitcom Mother and Son, which starred Garry McDonald as Arthur and Ruth Cracknell as Maggie, and ran from 1984 to 1994 on the ABC. The rebooted series was developed and funded by Screen Australia and Screen NSW. Original series creator Geoffrey Atherden collaborated with Matt Okine to create the new series.

Matt Okine had wished to create a reboot of Mother and Son since 2013, when he had been touring Hong Kong with Denise Scott, who would later play Maggie in the series. Okine admired the original series, describing it as "a beautiful snapshot of 1980s Australian suburbia, made hilariously unforgettable by its co-stars Ruth Cracknell and Garry McDonald". Although he acknowledged that he and Scott had "huge shoes to fill", Okine was optimistic that the series could work: "With my hairline going the way it is, I feel like I was born to play a 2023 version of Arthur!"

Jennifer Collins, acting director of entertainment and specialist for the ABC, revealed that the idea of a reboot of the original series had been "around for quite some time" and described the new series as being "a long time in the making". She noted that the series was "not something that has just been cooked up. It's something that's been given a lot of love and attention, detail and thought."

In November 2023, the ABC's chief content officer Chris Oliver-Taylor revealed that a second series of Mother and Son was in development: "The numbers were okay, I think we would have liked a bit more, but this is one of the most iconic ABC shows of all time. I want the show to have the respect it deserves and see if we can find an audience across two series. Now, whether it will finance or whether it will creatively develop, I don’t know." In August 2024, it was confirmed that a second series would be broadcast on ABC TV and released on ABC iview in 2025. The series began airing on 24 September 2025.

Wooden Horse produced the series.

=== Filming ===
Filming for the series began in March 2023 and took place in southern Sydney. Okine chose this location because he wanted to use a realistic setting for where Arthur Boye's father would have moved from Ghana in the 1970s, as Sydney has been noted for being a culturally diverse city. Maggie's house is located in the Sydney suburb of Dolls Point.

One of the first aspects of the series that Okine considered was whether the series would be shot using a single-camera or multi-camera format. Ultimately, Okine chose to film the series using a single-camera format because he did not wish the series to be stuck in 1980s Australia; he wished to distance the series from the original and reasoned that modern sitcoms no longer use the single-camera studio format.

== Episodes ==
=== Series overview ===
Series	Episodes	Originally released	
Series	Episodes	First released	Last released
1	8	23 August 2023	11 October 2023
2	6	24 September 2025	29 October 2025

=== Series 1 (2023) ===
No. overall	No. in season	Title	Directed by	Written by	Original release date	Aus. viewers
1	1	"Pilot"	Neil Sharma	Matt Okine	23 August 2023	441,000
When Maggie sets fire to the kitchen, her recently-single son, Arthur moves back into the family home where eccentric Maggie calls all the shots.
2	2	"Donation"	Neil Sharma	Matt Okine and Sarah Walker	30 August 2023	344,000
Maggie tries to inspire a visit from her grandchildren, while Robbie seeks a sperm donation from Arthur for her friends, a lesbian couple.
3	3	"Tracking Maggie"	Neil Sharma	Matt Okine and Tristram Baumber	6 September 2023	304,000
Maggie keeps going missing, leaving Arthur and Robbie to get creative in their attempts to keep track of her so Arthur can go on a date. Arthur meets Maya, whose family has taken over the dance studio that Maggie frequents.
4	4	"The Lodger"	Neil Sharma	Matt Okine	13 September 2023	282,000
Arthur battles with his identity when Maggie takes in a Ghanaian lodger at her house. Maggie and her new 'son' decide to run a Ghanaian food stall at the local markets. Arthur helps Dee pack for her move to Canberra.
5	5	"Bodies"	Kriv Stenders	Matt Okine and Sarah Walker	20 September 2023	265,000
Arthur and Maggie both engage in sexual misadventures with disastrous results. Maggie is horrified to learn that Leo's restaurant has been leased. Robbie tries to convince Maggie to sign over her Power of Attorney.
6	6	"Test"	Kriv Senders	Sarah Walker	27 September 2023	258,000
Maggie and Arthur aren't speaking to each other after Arthur finds out Maggie's plans to take her health into her own hands.
7	7	"Roadtrip"	Kriv Senders	Matt Okine and Tristram Baumber	4 October 2023	253,000
Arthur is determined not to take Maggie to Canberra with him to visit his ex, Dee, but Maggie has other plans. Maggie fears she is becoming 'invisible'. Arthur comes to terms with the nature of his relationship with Dee.
8	8	"Bad Influence"	Kriv Senders	Tristram Baumber	11 October 2023	254,000
Arthur is concerned that Maggie's friend Heather may be a bad influence. Robbie's marriage faces a crisis after Arthur unwittingly gets involved. Maggie and Heather cause chaos at Tony and Maya's new restaurant.

=== Series 2 (2025) ===
No. overall	No. in season	Title	Directed by	Written by	Original release date	Aus. viewers (National) (Note: On 28 January 2024, OzTAM's ratings data recording system changed. Viewership data will now focus on National Total ratings instead of providing data on the 5 metro centres and overnight shares.)
9	1	"The Resort"	Shaun Wilson	Matt Okine and Tim Spencer	24 September 2025	400,000
When Maggie falls for a suave Activities Director on a family holiday, Arthur suspects 'Ronaldo' is out to exploit Maggie, while Robbie's sure Liz is getting more than just upgrades from the Resort Manager
10	2	"Smoke and Mirrors"	Shaun Wilson	Matt Okine and Sarah Walker	1 October 2025	380,000
When Arthur notices Maggie's hearing has started to decay, he comes up with creative ways to force her into acceptance. But it's soon revealed that Maggie isn't the only Boye in denial about their shortcomings.
11	3	"The Scam"	Shaun Wilson	Sarah Walker	8 October 2025	348,000
When Maggie reveals that she's been keeping a $30,000 nest egg "for a rainy day", she becomes a target to her own conniving kids, not to mention the endless other scammers preying on Australia's elderly.
12	4	"Bondi Arthur"	Shaun Wilson	Matt Okine and Tristram Baumber	15 October 2025	318,000
Arthur wants to be a different person – to be in his Bondi era – but Maggie and bestie troublemaker Heather chain themselves in the way of his personal development.
13	5	"Arthur Has a Fall"	Shaun Wilson	Matt Okine	22 October 2025	329,000
When Arthur breaks both his wrists in a fall, Maggie has to look after the son who usually looks after her... and in the process foils his attempt at instant Internet fame.
14	6	"A Night to Remember"	Shaun Wilson	Matt Okine	29 October 2025	306,000
Terrified that her memory is failing her, Maggie decides to throw a "70th Birthday to remember" and unwittingly drags Arthur and Robbie into a chaos they'd soon wish to forget.

== Awards and nominations ==
Year	Award	Category	Nominee(s)	Result	Ref
2024	Logie Awards	Best Lead Actress in a Comedy	Denise Scott	Won	
2024	Logie Awards	Best Lead Actor in a Comedy	Matt Okine	Won	
2024	Logie Awards	Best Scripted Comedy Program		Won	
2025	AWGIE Awards	Comedy – Situation or Narrative	Matt Okine and Tristram Baumber ("Bad Influence")	Nominated	

== Reception ==
Reviews for the series were mixed. Luke Buckmaster in Guardian Australia wrote that, "As a remake it's lackluster (and not a patch on the original), but as its own production, doing its own thing, it’s modestly entertaining." He went on to conclude that, "The new Mother and Son is at its best when focusing on interpersonal dynamics and snarky back-and-forth between the titular characters. Scott and Okine both do a good job, bringing likability and some charisma. But talk about a poisoned chalice. The genius of McDonald and Cracknell is even more apparent now that others have performed in their shadows."

Robert Moran wrote in the Sydney Morning Herald: "For a sitcom, this Mother and Son is not necessarily funny; in fact, it's low-key depressing. A lot of the gags sit there without a sharp pay-off, lending the series […] a flat energy that might be the best argument yet for the return of the TV laugh track." However, he continued, "[t]he series feels significant in broaching those icky topics we'd often rather ignore," and concluded with acknowledgment of the "show's overarching pleasantness" as a "reason to stick with it [...] Despite its famous template, this version feels like a breath of fresh air."
