= Lilydale High School =

Location
- Melbourne, Victoria; Australia; 37.7605°S 145.3442°E

Information
- Type: co-educational public government school
- Motto: Excellence in learning, resilience in life, thriving in community.
- Established: 1919
- Principal: Wendy Powson
- Assistant Principals: Stuart Young, Melissa McMillan, Trent Silk
- Teaching staff: 106.4 (on an FTE basis)
- Years: 7–12
- Enrolment: 1371 (2022)
- Campus: Melba Avenue, Lilydale
- Colours: Maroon, white (and navy blue for VCE students)
- Slogan: Respice Lucem
- Website: www.lilydalehs.vic.edu.au

Lilydale High School is a co-educational government secondary school located in Lilydale, Victoria. As of 2009, the school includes science, media, technology and multi-purpose learning areas.

== History ==
Lilydale High School was founded in 1919, at which stage it was housed in a single building not located on the current school grounds. In the May 2006 Victoria state budget, A$5.65 million had been allocated to the school for the completion of construction at the school, consisting of 15 new buildings and facilities to be completed between 2006 and 2007.

Leon Bishop commenced as the school's Principal in 2006 after the retirement in 2005 of the previous school's Principal of 18 years, John Benison.

In 2019, the school's Steam (STEM) coordinator, Tony Vallance, won the Australian Teacher of the Year award in the Australian Education Awards.

== Sporting achievement ==
In 2006 the school was awarded the Eastern Metropolitan Region's Most Outstanding School Achievement in Physical and Sport Education, after participating in every competition held by the Victorian Secondary Schools Sports Association, and offering its facilities to students in years 5 and 6 from local primary schools.

In 2015, the school were the Victorian Junior Boys Netball champions.

== Notable alumni ==
- Leigh Adams- AFL footballer
- Gordon Collis – footballer, Brownlow Medal winner
- Kylah Day – actress and model
- Bayley Fritsch – AFL footballer
- Sam Frost – actress
- Jordan Gallucci – AFL footballer
