= Leith Clark =

Canadian-born English fashion stylist, editor and journalist

- Born: 1979 (age 45–46)
- Citizenship: Canada
- Occupation(s): Fashion stylist, editor, Fashion journalist
- Known for: Founder and editor of Lula Magazine, Founder and editor of Violet Book
- Spouse: James Hatt

Leith Clark (born 1979) is a Canadian born English fashion stylist, editor, and fashion journalist. She is best known as the founder and editor of Lula Magazine as well as the founder and editor of Violet Book, a UK based fashion and lifestyle magazine.

== Career ==
=== Editorial work ===
Clark interned for Interview Magazine as a teenager before moving to Vogue UK.

Clark founded fashion magazine Lula in 2005. Clark credited her creation of Lula with her frustration with the sexualization of women in fashion magazines, wanting instead to make "a magazine of women looking at women, without that competitiveness and that hard edge that we think we need as we get older."

In 2013 Clark announced that she was resigning as Lula's editor-in-chief. Instead she was leaving to create a new type of magazine for older women, Violet Book, which Clark launched in 2014. Clark admitted in an interview that the magazine was inspired by "the way youth is over-celebrated."

Clark has been the Style Director At Large of Harper's Bazaar UK since 2014.

=== Stylist work ===
Clark also works as a celebrity stylist counting among her current clients Lucy Boynton, Zoe Kazan, Keira Knightley, Rosamund Pike, and Gugu Mbatha-Raw. Her past clients include Felicity Jones and (actress)Michelle Williams. In 2017 and 2024 The Hollywood Reporter included her in their list of the 25 Most Powerful Stylists in Hollywood.

== Personal life ==
Clark married to production designer James Hatt in 2012. They have a daughter, born in 2014.
