= Itch (TV series) =

Australian children's television series

- Genre: Action-adventure; Drama; Ecofiction; Family
- Created by: Melanie Halsall & Amanda Morrison
- Inspired by: Itch by Simon Mayo
- Developed by: Dan Berlinka
- Written by: Melanie Halsall; Dan Berlinka; Ron Elliott; Heather Wilson; Jessica Brookman; Roger Monk; Rhys Graham; Ceinwen Langley
- Directed by: Renée Webster; Nicholas Verso; Tenika Smith
- Theme music composer: Diego Baldenweg with Nora Baldenweg and Lionel Baldenweg (the Baldenwegs)
- Composers: Diego Baldenweg; Nora Baldenweg; Lionel Baldenweg; Ash Gibson Greig
- Country of origin: Australia
- Original language: English
- No. of series: 2
- No. of episodes: 20

Production
- Executive producers: Jan Stradling; Amanda Morrison; Edward Glauser; Andrew Cole Bulgin; Michael Shyjka; Robert Morrison; Libby Doherty; Melanie Halsall
- Producers: Tania Chambers; Melanie Halsall; Amanda Morrison
- Cinematography: Darrell Martin; Jim Frater
- Camera setup: Multi-camera
- Running time: 24 minutes
- Production companies: Komixx Entertainment; Feisty Dame Productions

Original release
- Network: ABC Me
- Release: 15 January 2020 – 2 October 2021

Itch is an Australian children's action-adventure television series which premiered on ABC iView on 31 December 2019 and ABC Me on 15 January 2020. The two ten-part action adventure series is based on the books written by Simon Mayo. It is directed by Renée Webster, Nicholas Verso and Tenika Smith. The show was renewed for a second series in October 2020 which premiered on ABC ME and ABC iview on 17 September 2021.

The first series was shot in Albany and Perth, Western Australia between February and April 2019 and the second series was filmed in the Albany, Peel region and Perth, Western Australia between October and December 2020.

== Plot ==
Itchingham Lofte loves science, especially chemistry. He is also an element hunter: he is collecting all the elements in the periodic table, which leads him to conduct sometimes destructive experiments in his bedroom. Itch obtains a rock which he believes is a new element and has strange properties. At first no one believes him, but soon various people – all connected to the powerful GreenCorp – are chasing after the strange new rock. Itch and his family are catapulted into a breathless adventure with terrifyingly high stakes.

== Main cast ==
- Samuel Ireland (VF : Laurent Quentier) as Itch Lofte
- Melanie Wozniak as Jack Lofte
- Kylah Day as Lucy Cook
- Charles Russell as Tim Curran
- Keala Kern as Chloe Lofte
- Harrison Popple as Darcy
- Henry Mendez as Quinn
- Lauren Campbell as Bella Lannister
- Sam Longley as Cake
- Catherine Moore as Jude Lofte
- Mel Grob as Lenora Curran
- Michael Muntz as Dr Flowerdew
- Priscilla-Anne Jacob as Roshanna Wing
- Warren Lyons as Arthur Lannister
- Rina Mousavi as Michaels
- Jarrad Inman as Jarrad
- Fern Nicholson as Agent Fairnie
- Tristan Corey as Agent Rogers
- Ben Mortley as Nick Lofte

== Episodes ==
=== Series 1 ===
No.	Title	Directed by	Written by	Original release date
1	"Elementary"	Reneé Webster	Dan Berlinka	15 January 2020 (ABC ME); 4 June 2020 (BYUtv)
Itchingham Lofte may appear to be a normal high school student, but at heart he's very different. He loves to collect elements. One day he discovers an unusual looking rock at a local collectors shop that he believes may be a new element. He purchases it and heads to school. When half the school begins to get sick though, Itch begins to wonder if the rock is to blame for the illnesses.
2	"Chronic Boom Boy"	Reneé Webster	Ron Elliott	16 January 2020 (ABC ME); 11 June 2020 (BYUtv)
A new boy, Tim, tries to become friends with Itch, but Itch doesn't reciprocate the feelings. He may have to rely on Tim's help though when Doctor Flowerdew decides to keep the rock and send it off for testing at a professional lab.
3	"Trust No One"	Reneé Webster	Ron Elliott	17 January 2020 (ABC ME); 18 June 2020 (BYUtv)
Mysterious guys in black pursue Itch trying to get ahold of the rock, so Itch is forced to rely on help from Tim. Meanwhile Cake informs Itch that the rock must be destroyed because the guys in black have sinister plans for it.
4	"Rock 'n' Roll"	Reneé Webster	Heather Wilson	18 January 2020 (ABC ME); 25 June 2020 (BYUtv)
After finding Cake unconscious from what appears to be radiation poisoning, Itch decides he must destroy the rock. Before he can find a means to do so he is forced to attend a school concert where he sister Chloe is playing. Unfortunately it also means he could become an easy target.
5	"Escape"	Reneé Webster	Jessica Brookman	19 January 2020 (ABC ME); 2 July 2020 (BYUtv)
Lucy, Jack, Tim, and Itch decide to take the rock to a local mining institute to try and confirm if it's radiation poisoning from the rock that has put Cake's life on the line. If they can successfully find the cause, they can help the hospital cure Cake.
6	"Hi-Tech, Lo-Fi"	Nicholas Verso	Roger Monk	20 January 2020 (ABC ME); 9 July 2020 (BYUtv)
Everyone's worst fear has happened- Flowerdew has stolen the rock and left Itch and his friends stranded in a city they are unfamiliar with. Can they figure out a way to track him and reclaim the rock? Meanwhile in Seaburgh Darcy has his first run-in with the mysterious guys in black.
7	"Road Trip"	Nicholas Verso	Ron Elliott	21 January 2020 (ABC ME); 16 July 2020 (BYUtv)
Itch sends everyone back to Seaburgh so that no one will know where he goes to destroy the rock, but Tim secretly sneaks onto the bus. Is Tim really a friend? When the group gets back to Seaburgh Lucy begins being questioned by government agents, and Jack must figure out how to occupy Itch's mom so she doesn't get worried.
8	"Friends and Enemies"	Nicholas Verso	Melanie Halsall	22 January 2020 (ABC ME); 23 July 2020 (BYUtv)
After Tim and Itch abandon the bus because they think the government is the mysterious men in black, they must learn how to survive the Australian Outback with limited supplies. Meanwhile in Seaburgh Lucy, Jack, and Chloe work to learn what Greencorp's connection is to Flowerdew and what their real plan may be for the rock.
9	"End Game"	Nicholas Verso	Heather Wilson	23 January 2020 (ABC ME); 30 July 2020 (BYUtv)
Itch's father returns to try and help rescue his missing son with Australian Intelligence. Meanwhile Tim is exposed as wanting the rock to rescue his mother, and a desperate Flowerdew decides to try kidnapping to force Itch to finally give him the rock.
10	"376 Down"	Nicholas Verso	Dan Berlinka	30 January 2020 (ABC ME); 6 August 2020 (BYUtv)
Tim knocks out Itch's dad, and Flowerdew arrives with Jack being held hostage. When Flowerdew threatens to throw Jack into a deep mining well Tim tackles him, throwing them both into the mine well in the process but rescuing Jack. Itch sinks the rock in the deepest mine where no one will find it before falling unconscious from radiation poisoning. When he comes to Australian Intelligence awards him for his diligent service, members of Greencorp are arrested for trying to weaponize the rock, and the rock is made an element named Loftium. As the episode ends, Tim awakes on a long lost beach wondering where he's at.

=== Series 2 ===
No.	Title	Directed by	Written by	Original release date
11	"Back with a Bang"	Nicholas Verso	Dan Berlinka	23 September 2021 (ABC ME); 1 January 2022 (BYUtv)
The school year ends and the gang begins to wonder what they'll be doing for the summer. Itch reveals he'll be doing summer school to catch-up from the time he missed in hospital. Lucy is planning a beach cleanup, Darcy is planning on working at the country club, and Jack plans on working at the local vets office. Eventually Itch and Lucy decide to meet near the beach, and Itch plans on admitting he loves Lucy. Chloe encourages him to go for it but warns Itch that a bunch of dead fish are washing up. As the two meet an explosion occurs in the bay causing the beach to be closed. The group thinks Greencorp may have something to do with it, so they track down Tim's mom (Lenora) to see if she can help them and so Itch can thank her for Tim saving Jack's life. As Jack tells her what Tim did, Tim comes out and reveals he's still alive.
12	"Big Brother"	Nicholas Verso	Heather Wilson	24 September 2021 (ABC ME); 1 January 2022 (BYUtv)
A woman in black pursues Itch, Tim, and the gang trying to get Lenora to permanently shut up. As a result Australian Intelligence puts them and their families into a safe house, a house Lenora owns that is undocumented. Meanwhile Lucy tests the water at the beach and discovers it has been poisoned by chemicals, meaning if anyone goes into it a lot more than the fish could become sick and die.
13	"Confrontations"	Nicholas Verso	Heather Wilson	25 September 2021 (ABC ME); 1 January 2022 (BYUtv)
When the mayor decides she should reopen the beach, Itch and Lucy try to convince her it's unsafe. However they may need some help from Darcy to even be able to see her. Elsewhere Tim turns to Chloe to try and figure out how he can regain their trust. His solution: a pool party and a speech, but Chloe has other ideas on what must happen for him to be forgiven.
14	"A Game"	Nicholas Verso	Melanie Halsall	26 September 2021 (ABC ME); 21 January 2022 (BYUtv)
Itch must rely on help from Darcy in order to sneak into the country club and steal Lannister's (Greencorp's President) laptop in order to find out what data he has on the water poisoning. Meanwhile Lucy and Tim visit the former president of Greencorp, Roshanna, and see if she's willing to share any information on their future plans and see if she knows what might be poisoning the water.
15	"Small Town Hackers"	Nicholas Verso	Craig Irvin	27 September 2021 (ABC ME); 1 January 2022 (BYUtv)
When the mayor announces it is time to reopen the beach, it is up to Tim and Lucy to convince her that the water is still unsafe for everyone. Jack comes up with a plan to test one of the dead fish, but an agent from the Department of Fish who works for Greencorp stops that plan. Meanwhile Tim and Chloe put their hacking skills to the test and try to find out if Lannister's laptop has any other information they can use.
16	"Stakeout"	Tenika Smith	Jessica Brookman	28 September 2021 (ABC ME); 1 January 2022 (BYUtv)
The team divides into two forces. One group, led by Itch and Lucy decide to track down the water source responsible for the increasing poison in the bay. Meanwhile Tim tries to track down an escaped Roshanna and see if she's willing to help them crack Lannister's laptop information.
17	"The Enemy of My Enemy"	Tenika Smith	Rhys Graham & Heather Wilson	29 September 2021 (ABC ME); 1 January 2022 (BYUtv)
Itch and Tim use a postcard and a secret cellphone message to try and find a person who has information on Greencorp and might be willing to help them, but it may require them to break the law and find a safe hiding place. Meanwhile Lucy follows Lannister to find something they can use to steal his fingerprint and infiltrate a secret Greencorp base.
18	"Special Ops"	Tenika Smith	Cienwen Langley	30 September 2021 (ABC ME); 1 January 2022 (BYUtv)
Itch, Lucy, and Tim infiltrate Greencorp's secret base and learn that an old enemy is in charge of the facility, Flowerdew. The plan is revealed- Flowerdew is trying to clone loftium. He believes he's found the solution to do so and decides to ignore all requirements. After catching the trio he decides to lock them up, but since the Greencorp scientists forget to check the trio's pockets Itch is able to call Jack and tell her that she and Darcy need to go retrieve the loftium from the mineshaft under water. If they're unable to do so, Flowerdew may accidentally destroy Seaburgh.
19	"No Turning Back"	Tenika Smith	Jessica Brookman	1 October 2021 (ABC ME); 1 January 2022 (BYUtv)
The trio finds out the air vent may provide an escape from Greencorp's secret lab, but only Tim is small enough to fit in it. Can Itch and Lucy find another way to escape or a way to distract Flowerdew so Tim can escape uncaught? Meanwhile Jack and Darcy retrieve Darcy's diving gear, and Darcy dives to retrieve the loftium, but his air canister only has 35 minutes of air. If that weren't enough Greencorp has sent the lady in black to stop them, but Roshanna may have something to say about that.
20	"Last Goodbye"	Tenika Smith	Melanie Halsall	2 October 2021 (ABC ME); 1 January 2022 (BYUtv)
Flowerdew and Lannister start the machine to try and create a copycat loftium. At first it looks like it'll be successful, but when the copycat loftium creates its own power source that begins to go unstable, Flowerdew realizes Itch was right all along. Lannister decides to flee the facility while Flowerdew works with Itch and Lucy to try and stop the copycat loftium. Jack and Darcy arrive with the real loftium, and Itch reveals that the Real loftium can be input into the copycat loftium's chamber to destroy both of them, but because it must be input manually someone will get full radiation exposure and die. Who will make the ultimate sacrifice and save the world?

== Awards and nominations ==
Year	Award	Category	Recipients and nominees	Result	Refs
2020	10th AACTA Awards	Best Original Music in Television	Diego Baldenweg, Nora Baldenweg, Lionel Baldenweg	Nominated	

== International Broadcast ==
The first series aired on TVNZ in New Zealand in February 2020, BYU TV in the United States in June 2020, CBBC Channel in the United Kingdom in November 2020, in Finnish on Yle in Finland in September 2020 and in Catalan in Super3 in Spain in February 2021.

Season 2 began airing on BYU TV's app on 1 January 2022, with an official double episode television premiere on 4 January 2022.

In Canada, the show airs on WildBrainTV.
