= How to Please a Woman =

- Directed by: Renée Webster
- Written by: Renée Webster
- Produced by: Tania Chambers; Judi Levine
- Starring: Sally Phillips; Caroline Brazier; Erik Thomson; Tasma Walton; Alexander England
- Cinematography: Ben Nott
- Edited by: Merlin Eden
- Music by: Guy Gross
- Production companies: Feisty Dame Productions; Such Much Films
- Release date: 19 May 2022
- Running time: 107 minutes
- Country: Australia
- Language: English

How to Please a Woman is a 2022 Australian comedy-drama film directed by Renée Webster, starring Sally Phillips, Caroline Brazier, Erik Thomson, Tasma Walton and Alexander England.

== Plot summary ==
When Gina Henderson (Sally Phillips) is fired from her office job, she takes over the operations of a moving company to try and turn their fortunes around. With help and some encouragement from her friends at the swimming club, Gina asks the (all-male) crew to provide cleaning services and more to the women in their town. As the business succeeds, Gina re-evaluates her own love and sex life.

== Cast ==
- Sally Phillips as Gina Henderson
- Erik Thomson as Steve
- Hayley McElhinney as Hayley
- Caroline Brazier as Sandra
- Tasma Walton as Monique
- Cameron Daddo as Adrian
- Alexander England as Tom
- Josh Thomson as Ben
- Ryan Johnson as Anthony
- Dan Paris as Mike
- Takia Morrison as Mandy

== Reception ==
On review aggregation website Rotten Tomatoes, the film has an approval rating of 71% based on 31 reviews. The website's critical consensus reads, "How to Please a Woman is disappointingly timid in some respects, but Sally Phillips' sparkling performance offsets many of this sex-positive comedy's nagging flaws." Sandra Hall of The Sydney Morning Herald rated the film 3.5 stars out of 5, writing that while she felt that Webster’s comic timing was "less assured" and "her script isn’t exactly crackling with witticisms", she believed that "its candour is engaging and so, too, is the camaraderie between Gina and her pals, male and female." Sheila O'Malley of RogerEbert.com rated the film 3 stars out of 4, writing that "Once the story settles in and the company is up and running, comedy and profundity ensue."

Leslie Felperin of The Guardian rated the film 3 stars out of 5, writing that "The end result is nowhere near as persuasive or grounded in solid screenwriting as Leo Grande is, but Phillips has always been a charmer onscreen and, like Grande’s Emma Thompson, she’s more than willing to use her talent here to make a case for women learning to manage and take charge of their own pleasure." Wenlei Ma of News.com.au gave the film a rating of 3/5, writing that "It doesn’t feel as if it has to rely on shock value because the core of the story isn’t about the sex, it’s about learning to accept that sex can be great, and there’s nothing wrong with wanting it to be great." Noel Murray of the Los Angeles Times wrote that "while its premise is at times iffy, the movie as a whole has a refreshing randiness about it."

Tim Robey of The Daily Telegraph rated the film 2 stars out of 5, writing that "With so many scenes of liberating banter shot inside a ladies’ shower facility, they might have chosen one that didn’t look as though this lot were mischievously entertaining one other in a PoW camp." Fran Hoepfner of TheWrap wrote a negative review of the film, writing that "Without a commitment to its tone, “How To Please A Woman” might help its titular woman, but it leaves its audience quite dissatisfied." Natalia Winkelman of The New York Times wrote that while the hook "piques curiosity — at least enough for a coy eyebrow raise", "Light intrigue is often not enough", and that "in this case, the movie strains to sustain charm."
