= Trouble with the Curve =

2012 film by Robert Lorenz

- Theatrical release poster
- Directed by: Robert Lorenz
- Written by: Randy Brown
- Produced by: Clint Eastwood; Robert Lorenz; Michele Weisler
- Starring: Clint Eastwood; Amy Adams; Justin Timberlake; John Goodman
- Cinematography: Tom Stern
- Edited by: Joel Cox; Gary D. Roach
- Music by: Marco Beltrami
- Production company: Malpaso Productions
- Distributed by: Warner Bros. Pictures
- Release date: September 21, 2012
- Running time: 111 minutes
- Country: United States
- Language: English
- Budget: $60 million
- Box office: $49 million

Trouble with the Curve is a 2012 American sports drama film directed by Robert Lorenz and starring Clint Eastwood, Amy Adams, Justin Timberlake, Matthew Lillard, and John Goodman. The film revolves around an aging baseball scout whose daughter joins him on a scouting trip. Filming began in March 2012, and the film was released on September 21, 2012.

This was Eastwood's first acting project since 2008's Gran Torino and his first acting role in a film he did not direct since his cameo in 1995's Casper. A year after its release, the film became the subject of a plagiarism lawsuit by a producer alleging that his former partner had taken an unfinished script after a dispute and conspired with his agent and Warner Bros. Pictures to present it as the work of a relative unknown.

== Plot ==
Aging Atlanta Braves baseball scout Gus Lobel believes his latest scouting assignment may be his last unless he can prove his value to the organization. He's viewed as unadaptable to changes within the game, especially advanced statistical analysis. His boss and friend, Pete Klein, does not want to let him go, but must contend with ambitious junior executive Phillip Sanderson, who is trying to position himself to fill the post of general manager and feels Gus is an obstacle to his ambition.

Ahead of the upcoming MLB draft, Gus is assigned to review a top prospect, egotistical North Carolina high schooler Bo Gentry. Pete suspects Gus is hiding health problems, so he asks Gus's daughter Mickey — a workaholic lawyer pursuing partnership in her firm — to accompany him. Although the two have a strained relationship, Mickey agrees and quickly realizes Gus's sight is failing, so she actively helps to make up for his shortcoming. Along the way, Gus reconnects with a former player he once scouted, Johnny "The Flame" Flanagan, now a scout for the Boston Red Sox, who wants to try out as a major-league play-by-play announcer. Mickey bonds with Johnny over a shared love of baseball, and the two start becoming attracted to one another.

While on the road, Mickey confronts Gus about why he always left her behind with relatives while he was on the road. Gus reveals that on one scouting trip when she was six she was lured away from him by a pedophile, an incident of which Mickey has no memory. While Gus prevented anything from happening to her, he felt that always being on the road meant he couldn't protect her properly. She tells him that leaving her behind was in fact worse, blaming that decision for issues in her personal life.

Other scouts find Gentry's hitting impressive, but Gus and Mickey spot that he is unable to hit a curveball - with Gus attributing his ability to high school pitching and using an aluminum bat - and they advise both Johnny and the Braves management to pass on him in the draft. Johnny accepts their advice, but Phillip shows his statistical analysis as proof they should draft Gentry. Phillip doubles down by staking his career on his decision, leading Braves general manager Vince to draft Gentry as the club's first pick. The next day Johnny angrily confronts Gus and Mickey, believing they only told him not to recommend Gentry in order to allow the Braves to draft him instead. Gus and Mickey argue at their motel and Gus leaves, taking a bus back to Atlanta.

Preparing to leave, Mickey observes a young man, Rigoberto Sanchez, pitching with his younger brother and realizes his talent from the sound of the ball hitting the glove. After seeing his curveball, she calls Pete and asks that Rigoberto be allowed to attend a tryout in Atlanta. Gus has returned to Turner Field, where media are attending Gentry's first batting practice with the organization. As Vince and Phillip criticize Gus for his evaluation of Gentry, Mickey brings Rigoberto to the field, where he is mocked by Phillip and Gentry. Mickey insists they allow him to pitch, and after Gentry fails to hit any of his fastballs, Mickey has Rigoberto throw his curveball. Gentry, even though he knows what pitch is coming, can not connect with the ball. Gus explains why he was against signing him: "It's called 'trouble with the curve'".

The executives realize they were wrong about both Gentry and Gus and are now intent on signing Rigoberto, with Gus suggesting that Mickey represent him. When Phillip continues to make snide remarks about the situation, Vince fires him, and also offers Gus a contract extension. Mickey receives an offer of a partnership in her firm, which she declines in favour of representing Rigoberto, and, when she and Gus leave the stadium, finds Johnny outside waiting for her. As the two share a kiss, Gus lights a cigar and walks away, muttering, "Looks like I'll be taking the bus."

== Cast ==
- Clint Eastwood as Gus Lobel
- Amy Adams as Mickey Lobel
- Justin Timberlake as Johnny "The Flame" Flanagan
- Matthew Lillard as Phillip Sanderson
- Jack Gilpin as Schwartz
- John Goodman as Pete Klein
- Robert Patrick as Vince
- Scott Eastwood as Billy Clark
- Ed Lauter as Max
- Chelcie Ross as Smitty
- Raymond Anthony Thomas as Lucious
- Matt Bush as Danny
- George Wyner as Rosenbloom
- Bob Gunton as Watson
- Tom Dreesen as Rock
- James Patrick Freetly as Todd
- Joe Massingill as Bo Gentry
- Jay Galloway as Rigoberto (Rigo) Sanchez
- Sammy Blue as the blues guitar musician

== Production ==
=== Filming ===
Filming began in Georgia in March 2012.

Locations included:

- Georgia Tech
- Atlanta: Virginia–Highland neighborhood including George's restaurant.
- Turner Field, former home of the Atlanta Braves.
- Macon, Georgia, Luther Williams Field, former home of the Macon Braves
- Dawsonville: Amicalola Lodge
- Young Harris: Young Harris College baseball fields
- Athens: College Ave & Clayton streets
- Dunwoody High School: Baseball Fields
- Jasper, Georgia
- Swannanoa, North Carolina
- Marion, North Carolina

== Release ==
=== Critical response ===
On review aggregation website Rotten Tomatoes the film has an approval rating of 51% based on 204 reviews, with a rating average of 5.60/10. The site's critical consensus reads, "Though predictable and somewhat dramatically underwhelming, Trouble with the Curve benefits from Clint Eastwood's grizzled charisma and his easy chemistry with a charming Amy Adams." On Metacritic, the film has a score of 58 out of 100 based on reviews from 40 critics, indicating "mixed or average reviews". Audiences polled by CinemaScore gave the film an average grade of "B+" on an A+ to F scale.

=== Box office ===
In its opening weekend, Trouble with the Curve ranked third in the box office, grossing $12.2 million. In its first week in theaters, it ranked second with $16,195,962. It remained in the top ten over the next two weeks with $31,218,109. However, the results at the box office were subsequently low. In twelve weeks, Trouble with the Curve grossed $35,763,137 in the United States, where it was distributed to 3,212 theaters. At the worldwide box office, the film grossed $48,963,137 which is the second lowest take for a film featuring Clint Eastwood as an actor, just ahead of Blood Work ($31,794,718 in worldwide box office). In January 2013, the film was nominated for Best Intergenerational Story at the AARP Movies for Grownups Awards, but lost to Silver Linings Playbook.

== Home media ==
Trouble with the Curve was released on DVD and Blu-ray on December 18, 2012.

== Plagiarism lawsuit ==
A year after the film's release, another producer, Ryan Brooks, filed a lawsuit in federal district court against Warner, the producers, two talent agencies, screenwriter Brown and Don Handfield, an actor and former partner of Brooks. He alleged copyright infringement and conspiracy, claiming the produced screenplay of the film bore striking similarities to Omaha, an unproduced screenplay he had commissioned from Handfield that had as its main character an older college baseball coach working through a difficult relationship with his grown daughter, as well as other plot elements.

Brooks, a former minor league baseball player himself, claimed that Handfield took the unfinished Omaha script with him after the two had a falling out over a rewrite. Handfield then, Brooks claims, conspired with Charles Ferraro, his agent at United Talent, to present it—with minor alterations such as changing the setting from college baseball to the major leagues—as the work of Brown, a fellow client of Ferraro with only two minor credits to his name who had primarily worked as a musician. Brooks' suit claimed that Brown's interviews to promote the film seemed rehearsed and frustrating to interviewers trying to understand how he created the film, and questioned how an unknown writer in his fifties managed to land the well-connected Ferraro as an agent.

All the named defendants who spoke to the media about the claims, including Brown, denied and derided them. Warner responded with a letter to Brooks' lawyer threatening serious legal actions in response if he did not withdraw the "reckless and false" complaint within a week. Attached to it was a draft of the Trouble with the Curve script, credited to Brown, that had purportedly been optioned by another production company in 1998. Brooks' lawyer questioned its authenticity to The New York Times suggesting that it bore signs of fabrication, such as the anachronistic use of Wireless laptops, and that there was no record of it having been registered with the Writers Guild of America, a common practice for screenwriters establishing authorship of their work before getting a production company interested.

Lawyers for the studio responded with a motion for summary judgment in their favor and presented evidence that they claimed proved Brown had written the first drafts of the script as early as 1996, including an affidavit from a computer forensics expert authenticating the timestamps on a floppy disk containing those early drafts. Brooks' lawyers called all of the evidence of earlier creation forged or tampered with, in addition to calling attention to anachronistic passages in those purported earlier drafts. In February 2014 Dale S. Fischer, the judge hearing the case, granted the motion, saying that Brooks had overstated the similarities between the two scripts and that, even if he hadn't, "the idea of a father-daughter baseball story is not protectable as a matter of copyright law."

Two months later Fischer dismissed the remaining claims under federal law, but said claims under state law could still be filed in state court. Brooks appealed his decision to the Ninth Circuit Court of Appeals, and in October refiled the case in Los Angeles County Superior Court. This time he alleged only breach of contract and did not name either Warner or Eastwood as defendants, as he had in the original claim. He demanded $5 million in damages. Brooks voluntarily dismissed the case in August 2016.

== See also ==
- List of baseball films
