= Christophe Boltanski =

French journalist and writer

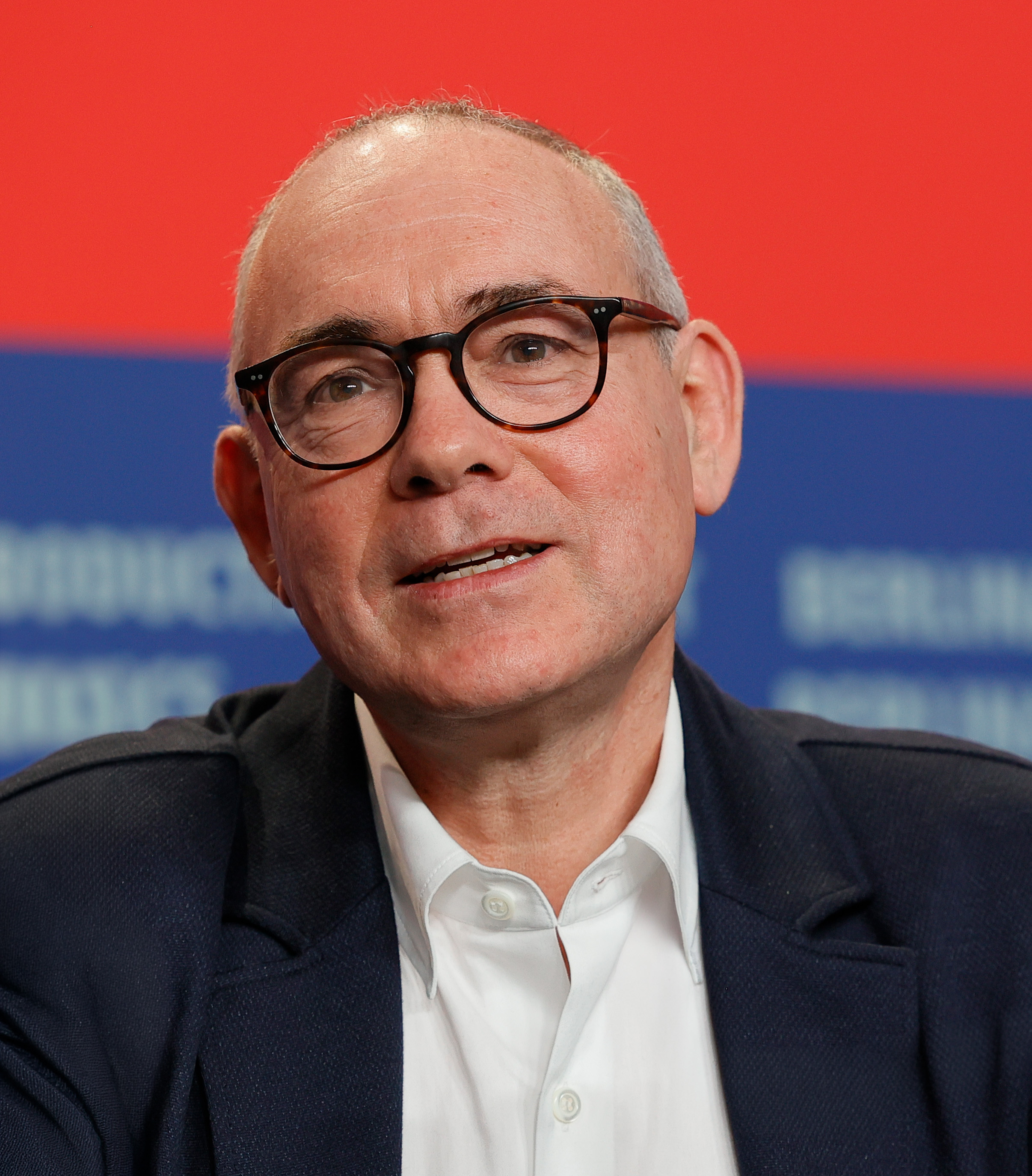
- Boltanski in 2025
- Born: 10 July 1962 (age 63); Boulogne-Billancourt
- Citizenship: French
- Occupations: journalist, writer, novelist
- Employer(s): Libération, Le Nouvel Obs
- Parent: Luc Boltanski
- Awards: Prix Bayeux-Calvados des correspondants de guerre 92000), Prix Femina (2015), Prix des prix littéraires (2015)

Christophe Boltanski (born 10 July 1962) is a French journalist, writer and chronicler. He was awarded laureate of the 2015 Prix Femina prize for his novel La Cache, which is the basis for the film La Cache (The Safe House).

== Biography ==
Christophe Boltanski is the son of sociologist Luc Boltanski and the nephew of linguist Jean-Élie Boltanski and conceptual artist Christian Boltanski.

After he completed his studies in 1987 at the Centre de formation des journalistes, Christophe Boltanski worked for the Le Progrès Egyptien (within the framework of his national service then for the daily Libération from 1989 to 2007; after being a war correspondent during the Gulf War, he was the correspondent of this newspaper in Jerusalem (1995–2000) and then in London (2000–2004).

From 2007 to 2017, he worked for the weekly Le Nouvel Observateur, while collaborating on the website Rue 89.

In 2000 he was awarded the Prix Bayeux-Calvados des correspondants de guerre for a report on a mine in Congo, in the Nord-Kivu region: "Les Mineurs de l'enfer".

== Works ==
Non-fiction Books

- Les Sept Vies de Yasser Arafat (with Jihan El-Tahri), Grasset, 1997 ISBN 978-2-246-49601-4
- Bethléem : 2000 ans de passion (with Farah Mébarki and Rémi Benali, at Éditions Tallandier, 2000 ISBN 978-2-235-02278-1
- Chirac d'Arabie (Les Mirages d'une politique française) (with Éric Aeschimann), Grasset, 2006 ISBN 978-2-246-69121-1
- Minerais de sang : Les esclaves du monde moderne, Folio (Gallimard), 2014 ISBN 978-2-07-045646-8, Grasset, 2012 ISBN 978-2-246-76471-7, photographs by Patrick Robert

Novels

- La Cache, Stock, collection bleue, 2015 ISBN 978-2-234-07637-2. – Prix Femina and Prix des prix littéraires 2015
