= Timothy (film) =

Australian comedy telefilm

Timothy is an Australian television comedy which first screened on ABC1 in 2014, as part of "Mental As...", to support Mental Health Week.

== Cast ==
- Stephen Curry as Timothy Garrett
- Denise Scott as Melinda Garrett
- Peter Rowsthorn as Colin
- Lisbeth Kennelly as Dr. Sandra Nelson
- John Leary as Mike Schroeder
- Natalie Medlock as Nurse
