= Robert Lorenz =

American film producer and director

Robert Lorenz is an American film producer and director, best known for his collaborations with Clint Eastwood. He has been nominated for the Academy Award for Best Picture three times, for Mystic River (2003), Letters from Iwo Jima (2006), and American Sniper (2014). He has also directed Trouble with the Curve (2012), The Marksman (2021) and In the Land of Saints and Sinners (2023).

== Life ==
As a producer he has been nominated three times for Best Picture: Mystic River (2003), Letters from Iwo Jima (2006), and American Sniper (2014). In 2012 he made his directorial debut with Trouble with the Curve. He is a longtime member of the Directors Guild of America and the Producers Guild of America. In 2015, he had a first look deal with Warner Bros.

== Filmography ==
He was producer for all films unless otherwise noted.

=== Film ===
Year	Film	Credit
2002	Blood Work	Executive producer
2003	Mystic River	
2004	Million Dollar Baby	Executive producer
2006	Flags of Our Fathers	
2006	Letters from Iwo Jima	
2007	Rails & Ties	
2008	Changeling	
2008	Gran Torino	
2009	Invictus	
2010	Hereafter	
2011	J. Edgar	
2012	Trouble with the Curve	
2014	Jersey Boys	
2014	American Sniper	
2021	The Marksman	
2023	In the Land of Saints and Sinners	Executive producer

Second unit director or assistant director

Year	Film	Role
1991	Femme Fatale	Second second assistant director
1991	Shakes the Clown	Second second assistant director
1991	Cool as Ice	Second assistant director
1992	Acquitted for Having Committed the Deed	Second assistant director
1992	Seedpeople	Second assistant director
1993	Silent Tongue	Second assistant director
1993	Monolith	Second assistant director
1994	Exit to Eden	Second second assistant director
1995	The Bridges of Madison County	Second assistant director
1995	Last of the Dogmen	Assistant director
1997	Absolute Power	First assistant director Second assistant director
1997	Midnight in the Garden of Good and Evil	First assistant director
1999	True Crime	First assistant director
2000	Space Cowboys	First assistant director
2002	Crossroads	First assistant director Second unit director
2002	Blood Work	First assistant director
2003	Mystic River	First assistant director
2004	Million Dollar Baby	First assistant director
2014	American Sniper	Second unit director

As director

Year	Film
2012	Trouble with the Curve
2021	The Marksman
2023	In the Land of Saints and Sinners

As writer

Year	Film
2021	The Marksman

Art department

Year	Film	Role
1990	Genuine Risk	Art swing gang

Miscellaneous crew

Year	Film	Role
1990	Slumber Party Massacre III	Production assistant

=== Television ===
Second unit director or assistant director

Year	Title	Role	Notes
1991	Cast a Deadly Spell	First assistant director: Second unit Second second assistant director	Television film
1992	Memphis	Second second assistant director	Television film
1994	My So-Called Life	Second assistant director	
1995	The Colony	Second assistant director	Television film
1995	Donor Unknown	Second second assistant director	Television film
1996	The Late Shift	Second assistant director	Television film
1996	A Face to Die For	Second assistant director	Television film
2001	Semper Fi	First assistant director	Television pilot
