= Lula (magazine) =

British biannual culture and fashion magazine

- Cover of the Summer 2024 edition
- Editor-in-chief: Nora Baldenweg
- Former editors: Leith Clark; Sheila Single
- Photographer: Damon Heath
- Categories: Culture and fashion
- Frequency: Biannual
- Founder: Damon Heath; Leith Clark
- Founded: 2005; 20 years ago
- Country: United Kingdom
- Language: English
- Website: Official website

Lula: Girl of My Dreams is a biannual British culture and fashion magazine launched in 2005 by fashion photographer Damon Heath and stylist Leith Clark. Clark, who served as both the founder and editor-in-chief of the magazine, created the publication as a reaction to the rampant materialism she saw in other magazines. The magazine has been praised for its unique vision and the strength of Clark's editorial vision.

== History ==
Clark served as both editor-in-chief and a contributing stylist to Lula from 2005 to 2013. In 2013 she announced that she was leaving the magazine in order to focus on the creation of her new magazine Violet Book. She was replaced by Sheila Single.

Though the magazine often used unknown or little known models as cover stars they also featured Kirsten Dunst, Lizzy Caplan, Charlotte Gainsbourg and Greta Gerwig. Under Clark's direction their issue featuring actress Charlotte Gainsbourg was their most successful copy.

== International edition ==
In 2014 Lula launched Lula Japan, an edition of the magazine focused on reaching Japanese readers. The first Japanese issue featured actress and model Stacy Martin on the cover photographed by Lula co-founder Damon Heath.

== Editor-in-chief ==
- Leith Clark, 2005-2013
- Sheila Single, 2014-2017
- Nora Baldenweg, 2017–present
