= The Marksman (2021 film) =

2021 film by Robert Lorenz

- Theatrical release poster
- Directed by: Robert Lorenz
- Written by: Robert Lorenz; Chris Charles; Danny Kravitz
- Produced by: Tai Duncan; Mark Williams; Warren Goz; Eric Gold; Robert Lorenz
- Starring: Liam Neeson; Jacob Perez; Katheryn Winnick; Juan Pablo Raba; Teresa Ruiz
- Cinematography: Mark Patten
- Edited by: Luis Carballar
- Music by: Sean Callery
- Production companies: Raven Capital Management; Sculptor Media; Zero Gravity Management; Voltage Pictures
- Distributed by: Open Road Films; Briarcliff Entertainment
- Release date: January 15, 2021 (United States)
- Running time: 108 minutes
- Country: United States
- Language: English
- Budget: $23–30 million
- Box office: $23.9 million

The Marksman is a 2021 American action drama film directed by Robert Lorenz. The plot follows a rancher and former Marine (Liam Neeson), living in an Arizona border town, who must help a young boy (Jacob Perez) escape a Mexican drug cartel. Katheryn Winnick, Juan Pablo Raba, and Teresa Ruiz also star.

The film was theatrically released in the United States on January 15, 2021, by Open Road Films and Briarcliff Entertainment. It received mixed reviews from critics, who praised Neeson's performance but criticized the film as being formulaic.

== Plot ==
Former US Marine Corps Scout Sniper and Vietnam War veteran Jim Hanson, a widower, lives along the Arizona-Mexico border with his dog, Jackson. While tending his ranch, which he is behind in payments on, he reports illegal border crossings to the United States Border Patrol, where his step-daughter Sarah works. One day he encounters Rosa and her son Miguel, Mexican citizens fleeing from the Mexican Mafia. As Hanson calls border patrol, a cartel gang led by Mauricio approaches and a shootout ensues, in which Hanson shoots and kills Mauricio's brother and Rosa is fatally wounded. Before dying, Rosa gives Hanson her family's address in Chicago and a bag of cash, begging him to take Miguel there, to which Hanson reluctantly agrees.

Border patrol show up after her death and take in Miguel. One of the cartel members comes in and claims that he's a relative of Miguel. Hanson happens to see their car there and sneaks Miguel out to go to safety. Meanwhile the gang bribe corrupt patrol officers to gain entry to the United States, and conduct their own manhunt in search for Miguel.

After Hanson uses his credit card to repair his truck, Mauricio tracks the pair to Route 66 in Oklahoma. However their road journey is interrupted when a patrol officer pulls them over and instructs Hanson into his squad car using an apparent cover story. The officer then telephones the gang in order to turn in Miguel, in which Hanson becomes suspicious. Knowing that the cop is corrupt, Hanson confronts him and a struggle ensues. Hanson and Miguel flee to a nearby hill, where they witness the gang cartel arrive and roughly question the officer (who awoke from unconsciousness), then shoot him dead.

Hanson and Miguel continue to make their way north. While staying at a motel, Hanson bribes the receptionist to not register him and Miguel as guests before the cartel shows up and during the escape, they kill Jackson. The patch on the truck's radiator fails while attempting to get away from the cartel and they are forced to stop. Eventually, Mauricio and his men catch up to Hanson and a firefight breaks out on a nearby farm. Hanson manages to kill three of the cartel members, but Mauricio captures Miguel.

After a skirmish, Hanson is shot and stabbed, but eventually comes into possession of Mauricio's gun with Miguel's help. Hanson shoots Mauricio before offering him a coup de grâce leaving a single bullet in his gun or a choice to shoot Hanson. As Hanson and Miguel leave the farm, they hear a gunshot.

They reach Chicago and Hanson leaves Miguel with his family before boarding a bus and succumbing to his wounds.

== Cast ==
- Liam Neeson as Jim Hanson, a former U.S. Marines sniper and Vietnam War veteran
- Katheryn Winnick as Sarah Pennington, border patrol agent, and step-daughter of Hanson
- Juan Pablo Raba as Mauricio, a deranged Mexican enforcer for the Vasquez Cartel
- Teresa Ruiz as Rosa, Miguel's mother who is on the run from the cartel
- Jacob Perez as Miguel, a boy who is on the run from the cartel with his mother
- Dylan Kenan as Randall
- Luke Rains as Everett
- Sean Rosales as Hernando
- Alfredo Quiroz as Carlos
- Amber Midthunder as Gas Station Clerk

== Production ==
The project, originally titled The Minuteman, was announced in May 2019, with Liam Neeson set to star. In September 2019, it was announced that Winnick and Raba joined the cast of the film.

Principal photography occurred in Lorain County, Portage County, Cleveland and other locations in Cuyahoga County, and Chardon, Ohio. Filming also occurred in New Mexico, and wrapped in October 2019.

== Release ==
The Marksman was initially scheduled to be theatrically released in the United States on January 22, 2021, but it was later moved up a week to January 15.

== Reception ==
=== Box office ===
The Marksman grossed $15.6 million in the United States and Canada, and $8.3 million in other territories, for a worldwide of $23.9 million.

The film grossed $3.7 million over the four-day MLK opening weekend, the second Open Road/Neeson title to top the box office during the COVID-19 pandemic after Honest Thief the previous October. The film played best in the South, with men making up 57% of the audience, and 72% being over the age of 25. It remained in first the following weekend with $2.03 million, then made $1.2 million in its third weekend and finished third.

=== Critical response ===
On review aggregator Rotten Tomatoes, the film holds an approval rating of 39% based on 108 reviews, with an average rating of 5.3/10. The site's critics consensus reads, "The Marksman benefits from having Liam Neeson in the lead, but this formulaic action thriller should have aimed higher." On Metacritic, it holds a weighted average score of 44 out of 100 based on 22 critics, indicating "mixed or average reviews". Audiences surveyed by PostTrak gave the film a 73% positive score, with 46% saying they would definitely recommend it.

Jeannette Catsoulis of The New York Times wrote: "Predictable to a fault, the movie coasts pleasurably on Neeson's seasoned, sad-sweet charisma." Michael O'Sullivan at The Washington Post rated the film 2/4 stars, writing that it "proves itself to be the cinematic version of comfort food: satisfyingly familiar but full of starch and empty calories."

Owen Gleiberman at Variety, gave a more negative review, stating "Lorenz stages the action with a convincing ebb and flow, but thanks to an undercooked script what happens in between is mostly boilerplate." David Ehrlich of IndieWire gave the film a C− and wrote "...The Marksman might be two three-ways short of The Mule, but almost everything about it — from its 'get off my lawn' misanthropy to its general take on the uselessness of government in American life — feels geared for a late-career Eastwood vehicle."
