= Kuoni Travel =

Tourism company based in Switzerland

Kuoni
- Type: Aktiengesellschaft
- Industry: Travel, Tourism
- Founded: 1906; 120 years ago
- Founder: Alfred Kuoni
- Headquarters: Zürich, Switzerland (historical) Regional operators based in respective countries
- Products: Charter and scheduled passenger airlines, package holidays, cruise lines, hotels, resorts, tailor-made holidays
- Services: Travel agencies
- Parent: REWE Group (via DERTOUR Group)
- Divisions: Kuoni UK (DERTOUR UK), Kuoni Switzerland (Kuoni Reisen), other Kuoni-branded regional operations under DERTOUR Group
- Website: kuoni.ch (Switzerland); see regional articles

Kuoni Travel is a tourism company, operating various services including charter and scheduled passenger airlines, package holidays, cruise lines, and hotels in destinations around the world across nine different geographic regions.

The company specialises in luxury and tailor-made travel for both business and consumer markets, as well as related services such as visa processing. In 2013, the Kuoni Group was named “World’s Leading Luxury Tour Operator” at the annual World Travel Awards.

== History ==
Kuoni was founded in 1906 by the entrepreneur Alfred Kuoni in Zurich, Switzerland, where the firm has continued to be based. Over time, Kuoni grew to be the biggest travel company in Switzerland. During 1965, Kuoni established a base in the United Kingdom by purchasing Challis and Benson in London’s Bond Street; over time, Kuoni became the leading long-haul tour operator in the British market.

In 1966, Peter Diethelm established the Kuoni UK tour operation. During 1970, Kuoni introduced the country's first charter flight to the Far East. In 1974, the company took over Houlders World Holidays and relocated its tour operation to new headquarters in Dorking, Surrey, after which it launched a long-haul tour programme. During 1980, Kuoni adopted a computerised reservations system, which the firm has credited with dramatically improving both the speed and flexibility of tailor-making its holidays. In 1981, Kuoni introduced its first batch of summer holidays to Switzerland.

During 1983, Kuoni was awarded the first Travel Weekly award for Britain’s Best Longhaul Tour Operator. In 1984, after reaching an arrangement with national flag carrier British Airways, the company operated the first chartered Concorde flight, which was flown to the Caribbean. During 1987, Kuoni offered the first round-the-world holiday by Concorde; that same year, it introduced the first charter flight to the Maldives. In 1988, the company launched the KUDOS reservations system for travel agents, increasing the flexibility of its holiday packages. During 1992, Kuoni is the first travel company to receive both the TTG and Travel Weekly Best Longhaul Operator award for 10 years in a row.

During 1998, Kuoni acquired Voyages Jules Verne; it also won its first ever award for ‘World’s Best Tour Operator’ at the World Travel Awards that year. In 1999, the company became the first British tour operator to offer an internet-based booking facility. In 2000, a collection of "handpicked" holidays, branded as Kuoni World Class was launched. In 2006 the firm acquired Journeys of Distinction and Kirker Holidays.

During 2007, Kuoni was voted as the Travel Weekly’s Best Longhaul Tour Operator for the 25th year and the Daily Mail’s Favourite Longhaul Tour Operator. In 2008, the company also acquired the luxury travel company Carrier. During 2009, Kuoni received a number of awards, including Favourite Family Tour Operator at the Sunday Times Travel Magazine Awards. Between 2009 and 2011, the company opened up new stores in various UK locations. In 2011, the Kuoni Explore magazine was launched, as well as a collection of "responsible tourism" holidays, branded Ananea.

During 2012, Kuoni formed an arrangement with department store John Lewis to become its exclusive travel partner, under which new stores were opened in various branches of John Lewis, including Southampton, London’s Oxford Street, Reading and Cardiff. In 2013, the company's first television advert was broadcast in the UK; the Stay & Cruise holidays brand was also launched and additional outlets opened at John Lewis stores in Leicester, Brent Cross, Aberdeen and Welwyn Garden City. During 2014, Kuoni was selected as one of the Sunday Times’ 100 Best Companies to Work For in the mid-sized category, while a new website for the company was launched that year.

== Current ownership structure ==
Following the 2015-2016 sale of Kuoni Group's tour operating divisions, the Kuoni brand operates through a series of independently-managed entities in their respective markets.

In the United Kingdom, Kuoni UK operates as part of DERTOUR UK, a subsidiary of the German REWE Group, and is headquartered in Dorking, Surrey.

In Switzerland, Kuoni is part of the REWE Group and its DERTOUR GROUP division, and is headquartered in Zurich.

In France, Kuoni is part of the REWE Group and its DERTOUR GROUP division, and is headquartered in Paris.

== Kuoni UK ==
Kuoni UK is part of DERTOUR UK (part of the German REWE Group) and is based in Dorking, Surrey, England. Kuoni UK has been in the premium and luxury tour operating business since 1966, specialising in multi-centre holidays, safaris and honeymoons in particular to the Maldives, Mauritius, Thailand, Sri Lanka & South Africa.

Kuoni UK has a network of 27 retail stores across the UK including 8 located in John Lewis retail stores.

Kuoni UK have been awarded Recommended Provider status by Which?, the UK's largest consumer organisation.
