= Renée Webster =

Filmmaker from Western Australia

Renée Webster is a filmmaker from Western Australia. She is known for her direction work on several TV series, including The Heights, and on television commercials. Her first feature film, How to Please a Woman, was released in 2022.

== Career ==
Webster's short films Scoff (2003) and Edgar and Elizabeth (2007) were screened in film festivals worldwide and garnered awards.

Her career in television started in Western Australia with direction work the children's television series Streetsmartz, which aired from 2005 to 2007. This was followed by directing three episodes of Marx and Venus (2007–8).

She was set-up director on five episodes of the children's TV series Itch, which aired in 2020, and directed 11 episodes across both seasons of The Heights (2019–2020), both on ABC Television.

She also directs television commercials, including for Lotterywest and Western Power, and documentaries.

She directed and wrote the screenplay for her first feature film, a comedy entitled How to Please a Woman, starring Sally Phillips and Erik Thomson. After screening at Perth International Arts Festival, the WA Made Film Festival and a gala night at Luna Cinemas in Perth, the film opened around Australia in May 2022 to generally positive reviews.

== Awards ==
- 2007: Nomination, AWGIE Award, for the short film Edgar and Elizabeth
- 2008: Winner, West Australian Screen Awards, Best Short Film Screenwriting, for Edgar and Elizabeth
- 2008: Winner, WOW Film Festival, Best Australian Fiction (Comedy), for Edgar and Elizabeth
- 2020: Nomination, Australian Directors Guild Awards for best direction for The Heights
