= Rascals on the Road =

- Directed by: Michael Steiner
- Written by: Michael Sauter, Christoph Frey, Michael Steiner
- Produced by: Peter-Christian Fueter, Andi Huber
- Starring: Manuel Häberli; Janic Halioua
- Cinematography: Pascal Walder
- Edited by: Tobias Fueter; Gisela Weibel
- Music by: Adrian Frutiger; Diego Baldenweg
- Production companies: Kontraproduktion AG; C-FILMS AG; SRF Schweizer Radio und Fernsehen; Impuls Home Entertainment AG; Teleclub AG
- Release date: September 2005
- Running time: 100 minutes
- Country: Switzerland
- Language: Swiss German

Rascals on the Road (German: Mein Name ist Eugen) is a 2005 Swiss film directed by Michael Steiner and written by Steiner, Michael Sauter, and Christoph Frey. Adapted from Klaus Schädelin’s children’s novel, it follows a group of schoolboys on a journey from Bern to Zurich. The film opened in German-speaking Switzerland in September 2005 and later won several awards, including the Swiss Film Award for Best Fiction Film.

== Synopsis ==
In 1960s Bern, the schoolboys Eugen and Wrigley run away after their mischief leaves them facing punishment. They set off for Zurich to find Fritzli Bühler, the “king of the rascals”, carrying an old treasure map that once belonged to him. Their journey takes them through Ticino and over the Alps, joined by their friends Bäschteli and Eduard, while their worried parents search for them.

== Cast ==
The cast includes:

- Manuel Häberli as Eugen
- Janic Halioua as Wrigley
- Dominic Hänni as Bäschteli
- Alex Niederhäuser as Eduard
- Mike Müller as Eugen’s father

== Production ==
The film was adapted from Klaus Schädelin’s children’s novel by director Michael Steiner and screenwriter Michael Sauter as a road movie from Bern through Ticino to Zurich. The Neue Zürcher Zeitung reported that the film had production costs of six million Swiss francs, around a quarter of which came from commercial and private sources.

== Release ==
The film opened in German-speaking Switzerland on 60 copies after numerous preview screenings at open-air events that summer. It went on to record around 580,000 cinema admissions in Switzerland, ranking as the third most successful Swiss film over the period 1976 to 2016.

== Reception ==
=== Awards ===
The film won several awards, including the Swiss Film Award for Best Fiction Film at Solothurn, the Zürcher Filmpreis, and the Grand Prix at the Festival international du Film pour enfants de Montréal in 2006. Among its 2007 awards were the Special Jury Prize at the International Festival of Films for Children and Young Adults and the Best Feature Film prize from the Bruges Children’s Jury at the European Youth Film Festival of Flanders.

=== Critical response ===
Filmdienst wrote that the film adapts a Swiss children’s classic in dialect form and said that, after an energetic start, it settles into a more utilitarian rhythm while remaining entertaining family cinema despite some overstatement.

== Festival screenings ==
The film was screened at festivals including the Solothurn Film Festival, the 28th Moscow International Film Festival, the 12th Sarajevo Film Festival, Filmfest Hamburg, and the 10th Tallinn Black Nights Film Festival in 2006. Among its 2007 festival screenings were the Berlin & Beyond Film Festival in San Francisco and the Zlín International Film Festival for Children and Youth.
