= Head Full of Honey (2018 film) =

Film directed by Til Schweiger

- Theatrical release poster
- Directed by: Til Schweiger
- Screenplay by: Til Schweiger; Lo Malinke; Jojo Moyes
- Based on: Head Full of Honey by Hilly Martinek; Til Schweiger
- Produced by: Til Schweiger; Christian Specht
- Starring: Nick Nolte; Matt Dillon; Emily Mortimer; Sophia Lane Nolte
- Cinematography: René Richter
- Edited by: Christoph Strothjohann; Til Schweiger
- Music by: Martin Todsharow; Diego Baldenweg; Nora Baldenweg; Lionel Baldenweg
- Production companies: Barefoot Films; Warner Bros. Film Productions Germany
- Distributed by: Warner Bros. Pictures
- Release dates: October 27, 2018 (Valladolid International Film Festival); November 30, 2018 (United States); March 21, 2019 (Germany)
- Running time: 128 minutes
- Countries: Germany; United States
- Language: English
- Box office: $138,844

Head Full of Honey is a 2018 drama film directed by Til Schweiger. It is an American remake of the 2014 German film of the same name, which Schweiger also directed and co-wrote with Hilly Martinek.

A widowed grandfather who has Alzheimer's disease is taken on a trip to Venice by his granddaughter by car, high speed train, on foot and by hitching rides.

The film was released on October 27, 2017.

== Plot ==
Retired veterinarian Amadeus Ross has Alzheimer's disease. The eulogy he holds at his wife Margaret's funeral reveals his deteriorating mental state. When his son Nick and granddaughter Matilda 'Tilda' visit him in Connecticut three months later, they see that he can no longer live on his own because of his mental condition. Nick convinces Amadeus to move into their house in England.

Nick is married to Sarah, but their marriage is in danger because not only did he have an affair when they lived in the US, but she had one with her boss in the UK. Amadeus's presence in the household causes disputes between the couple. For example, Amadeus causes a fire in the kitchen while trying to bake a cake, which Sarah puts out in the nick of time.

While Amadeus's mental state continues to degrade, he finally goes to see Dr. Holst, where he even has difficulty answering simple questions. Later, at the family's summer party in the garden, Amadeus accidentally causes a disaster by setting off some fireworks, which leads to Sarah moving out for a while.

Nick meets with Dr. Holst again, who convinces him that moving his father to a retirement home has become inevitable. However, Tilda does not agree this is how Amadeus should be treated. Shortly after Sarah returns home, Tilda embarks on a journey to Venice with her grandfather, where he and Margaret had spent their honeymoon. Tilda is told by her paediatrician Dr. Edwards that visiting places the sick person knows well can help living with the disease.

They start their trip by car, but soon Amadeus causes some crashes due his confusion with one-way streets and red lights. Tilda then gets them London-Venice Express high-speed train tickets, which fails when Amadeus wanders off the train in northern Italy. Tilda pulls the emergency brake to stop the train and runs after him. The police search for them, so they hide in a toilet stall.

In the evening, the janitor Mickey finds the pair and helps them continue their journey to Venice. Starting by sheep truck, they get stopped by the police, but manage to flee. After hitching a few more rides, they find shelter in a nunnery. The Mother Superior is so touched by their story that she drives Tilda and Amadeus to Venice.

Nick and Sarah also arrive in Venice, looking for the pair. They check into the same hotel as them, but they do not notice each other. Amadeus leaves the hotel at night. Tilda notices in the morning, goes looking for him, and finds him sitting on a bench near the sea.

It is revealed that, while on honeymoon there, Amadeus had sat on that bench with Margaret. His condition has advanced so far that he forgets he has a granddaughter, so he does not recognise Tilda. At that moment, Nick and Sarah find them, and the four travel back to England.

Both Nick and Sarah decide to cut back on working so that they can spend more time with Amadeus, while also hiring a carer. Towards the end, he moves into a nursing home. Nick and Sarah's marriage is saved thanks to their reconnecting during the Venice search. Then, their marriage is further solidified when Sarah gives birth to a baby boy nine months later, whom they name after his grandfather.

Amadeus spends his remaining days contentedly with his family, and dies quietly in bed in Tilda's presence. At the funeral, Tilda lies in the grass and looks to the sky, as Amadeus had promised he would watch over her from heaven.

== Cast ==
- Nick Nolte as Amadeus
- Matt Dillon as Nick
- Emily Mortimer as Sarah
- Sophia Lane Nolte as Matilda
- Jacqueline Bisset as Vivian
- Eric Roberts as Dr. Holst
- Greta Scacchi as Abbess
- Jake Weber as Dr. Edwards
- Til Schweiger as The London Restaurant Waiter
- Claire Forlani as Head Mistress
- J.David Hinze as Priest
- Matteo A.Bof as Train Station Policeman
- Veronica Ferres as Woman In Orient Express
- Costa Ronin as Russian Oligarch In Restaurant
- Luca Ribezzo as Police chief

== Production ==
An American remake of Til Schweiger's film Head Full of Honey was announced in March 2018, with Schweiger directing. Nick Nolte was cast in the leading role, which Michael Douglas was initially sought for. Matt Dillon and Emily Mortimer would star as his son and daughter-in-law respectively. Jacqueline Bisset joined the cast in April.

Filming had commenced by June in Germany. German state film funding spent 5.17 million US dollars on this film; the funding was conditional on a release in Germany.

== Reception ==
=== Box office ===
During the first two weeks, the film grossed US$65,000 in German movie theatres. On the second weekend, only 155 persons watched Head Full of Honey. In contrast, the 2014 version was the most successful film in German movie theaters that year, with over seven million viewers over the entire run time.

=== Critical response ===
It received positive to mixed reviews from audiences but negative reviews from critics. On review aggregator Rotten Tomatoes, Head Full of Honey has an approval rating of 0% based on six reviews.
