= Head Full of Honey (2014 film) =

- Theatrical release poster
- Honig im Kopf
- Directed by: Til Schweiger
- Written by: Til Schweiger
- Screenplay by: Til Schweiger; Hilly Martinek
- Produced by: Til Schweiger; Thomas Zickler
- Starring: Dieter Hallervorden; Emma Schweiger; Til Schweiger
- Cinematography: Martin Schlecht
- Edited by: Constantin von Seld
- Music by: Dirk Reichardt; Martin Todsharow; David Jürgens
- Production companies: Barefoot Films; Warner Bros. Film Productions Germany; SevenPictures Film
- Distributed by: Warner Bros. Pictures
- Release date: 25 December 2014
- Running time: 139 minutes
- Country: Germany
- Language: German
- Box office: US$63 million (Germany)

Head Full of Honey (German: Honig im Kopf; lit.: Honey in the Head) is a 2014 German drama film directed by Til Schweiger. It was one of eight films shortlisted by Germany to be their submission for the Academy Award for Best Foreign Language Film at the 88th Academy Awards, but it lost out to Labyrinth of Lies.

== Plot ==
Retired vet Amandus has Alzheimer's disease. A speech he holds at his wife Margarete's funeral reveals his deteriorating mental state. When his son Niko and his granddaughter Tilda visit him, they see that he can no longer live on his own. Niko convinces Amandus to move into his house near Hamburg.

Niko is married to Sarah, but their marriage is in danger because his wife has a romance with her boss, Serge. Amandus's presence in the household causes disputes between Niko and Sarah. For example, Amandus nearly causes a fire in the kitchen while trying to bake a cake, which Sarah only prevents in the nick of time.

While Amandus's mental state continues to degrade, a summer fête is thrown in the garden. Because of his condition, Amandus causes a disaster which leads to Sarah moving out. Niko now believes that moving his father to a retirement home has become inevitable, however his daughter Tilda does not think that this is the way Amandus should be treated. Instead, she wants to take her grandfather on a trip to Venice, where he and his wife Margarete had spent their honeymoon. Tilda has been told by her paediatrician Dr. Ehlers that visiting places the sick person knows well can help living with the disease. They start their trip by car, but soon get into a car crash when Amandus ignores a red traffic light. Tilda then decides that they should go by train. When Amandus accidentally leaves the train, Tilda pulls the emergency brake and runs after him. The police are now searching for them, so they hide in a toilet cabin. In the evening, a janitor helps them continue their journey to Venice. Going by a sheep lorry, they get stopped by the police but manage to flee and find shelter in a monastery. The Mother Superior is so touched by their story that she drives Tilda and Amandus to Venice.

Niko and Sarah also arrive in Venice, looking for Tilda and Amandus. They check into the same hotel as Niko and Sarah, but they don't notice each other. Amandus leaves the hotel at night. Tilda goes looking for him in the morning and finds him sitting on a bench. It is revealed that while on honeymoon in Venice, Amandus had sat on that bench with his wife Margarete. His condition has advanced so far that he forgets he has a granddaughter, so he doesn't recognise Tilda. At that moment, Niko and Sarah find Tilda and Amandus, and the four travel back to Hamburg.

Sarah decides to stop working so that she can take care of Amandus. The marriage of Niko and Sarah is saved when Sarah gives birth to a baby boy nine months later, whom they name after his grandfather. Amandus spends his remaining days contently with his family, and dies of cardiac failure in Tilda's presence. At the funeral, Tilda lies in the grass and looks to the sky, because Amandus had promised he would protect her from heaven.

== Cast ==
- Dieter Hallervorden – Amandus Rosenbach
- Emma Schweiger – Tilda Rosenbach
- Til Schweiger – Niko Rosenbach
- Jeanette Hain – Sarah Rosenbach
- Katharina Thalbach – Vivian Saalfeld
- Tilo Prückner – Dr. Ehlers
- Mehmet Kurtuluş – Dr. Holst
- Violetta Schurawlow – Nun
- Pasquale Aleardi – Police Officer
- Jan Josef Liefers – Serge
- Fahri Yardım – Erdal
- Samuel Koch

== Reception ==
The film was the highest-grossing German film released in 2014 with a gross of US$63 million and is currently the third highest-grossing German film of all time.

== US remake ==
On 21 March 2018, German media announced that Til Schweiger would create a remake of Honig im Kopf – with its literally-translated name, Honey in the Head – for the US market, with him as director and with Nick Nolte and Matt Dillon as main cast members. It was eventually titled Head Full of Honey.
