= List of Academy Award winners and nominees from Switzerland =

This is a list of Academy Award winners and nominees from Switzerland.

== Best Actor in a Leading Role ==
Best Actor
Year	Name	Film	Status	Notes
1962	Maximilian Schell	Judgment at Nuremberg	Won	
1976	Maximilian Schell	The Man in the Glass Booth	Nominated	

== Best Actor in a Supporting Role ==
Best Supporting Actor
Year	Name	Film	Status	Notes
1978	Maximilian Schell	Julia	Nominated	First German-speaking actor to be nominated in two different categories.

== Best Documentary ==
Documentary Feature
Year	Name	Film	Status	Notes
1961	Arthur Cohn	Le Ciel et la boue	Won	
1981	Arthur Cohn	Der Gelbe Stern	Nominated	Shared with Bengt von zur Mühlen.
1991	Arthur Cohn	American Dream	Won	
2000	Arthur Cohn	One Day in September	Won	
2002	Christian Frei	War Photographer	Nominated	

== Best Animated Feature ==
Animated Feature
Year	Name	Film	Status	Notes
2016	Claude Barras; Max Karli	My Life as a Courgette	Nominated	

== Best Original Screenplay ==
Best Original Screenplay
Year	Name	Film	Status	Notes
1946	Richard Schweizer	Marie-Louise	Won	First foreign language film to win a writing award.
2024	Tim Fehlbaum	September 5	Nominated	Shared with Moritz Binder and Alex David

== Best Adapted Screenplay ==
Best Adapted Screenplay
Year	Name	Film	Status	Notes
1949	Richard Schweizer; David Wechsler	The Search	Nominated	
2022	Edward Berger	All Quiet on the Western Front	Nominated	Berger was born in West Germany and holds Swiss citizenship Shared with Lesley Paterson and Ian Stokell

== Best Story ==
Best Story
Year	Name	Film	Status	Notes
1949	Richard Schweizer; David Wechsler	The Search	Won	

== Best Live Action Short ==
Live Action Short
Year	Name	Film	Status	Notes
1931/32	Mack Sennett	The Loud Mouth	Nominated	
1931/32	Mack Sennett	Wrestling Swordfish	Won	
1931/32	Hal Roach	The Music Box	Won	
1935	Hal Roach	Tit for Tat	Nominated	
1936	Hal Roach	Bored of Education	Won	
2009	Reto Caffi	Auf der Strecke	Nominated	
2014	Stefan Eichenberger; Talkhon Hamzavi	Parvaneh	Nominated	

== Best Animated Short ==
Animated Short
Year	Name	Film and Song	Status	Notes
2017	Giacun Caduff; Timo von Gunten	La Femme et le TGV	Nominated	

== Best Costume Design ==
Costume Design
Year	Name	Film	Status	Notes
1955	René Hubert	Désirée	Nominated	
1965	René Hubert	The Visit	Nominated	

== Best Visual Effects ==
Visual Effects
Year	Name	Film	Status	Notes
1980	H. R. Giger	Alien	Won	

== Best International Feature Film ==
Best International Feature Film
Year (Ceremony)	Film	Original title	Language(s)	Director	Result
1970 (43rd)	First Love	Erste Liebe	German	Maximilian Schell	Nominated
1973 (46th)	L'Invitation	L'Invitation	French	Claude Goretta	Nominated
1981 (54th)	The Boat Is Full	Das Boot ist Voll	German	Markus Imhoof	Nominated
1984 (57th)	Dangerous Moves	La Diagonale du fou	French	Richard Dembo	Won Academy Award
1990 (63rd)	Journey of Hope	Reise der Hoffnung	Turkish, Swiss German, Italian	Xavier Koller	Won Academy Award

== Honorary Academy Award ==
Academy Honorary Award
Year	Winner	Note
1938	Mack Sennett	For his contribution to Live Action Short films
2010	Jean-Luc Godard	"For passion. For confrontation. For a new kind of cinema."
