= Moses Storm =

American actor

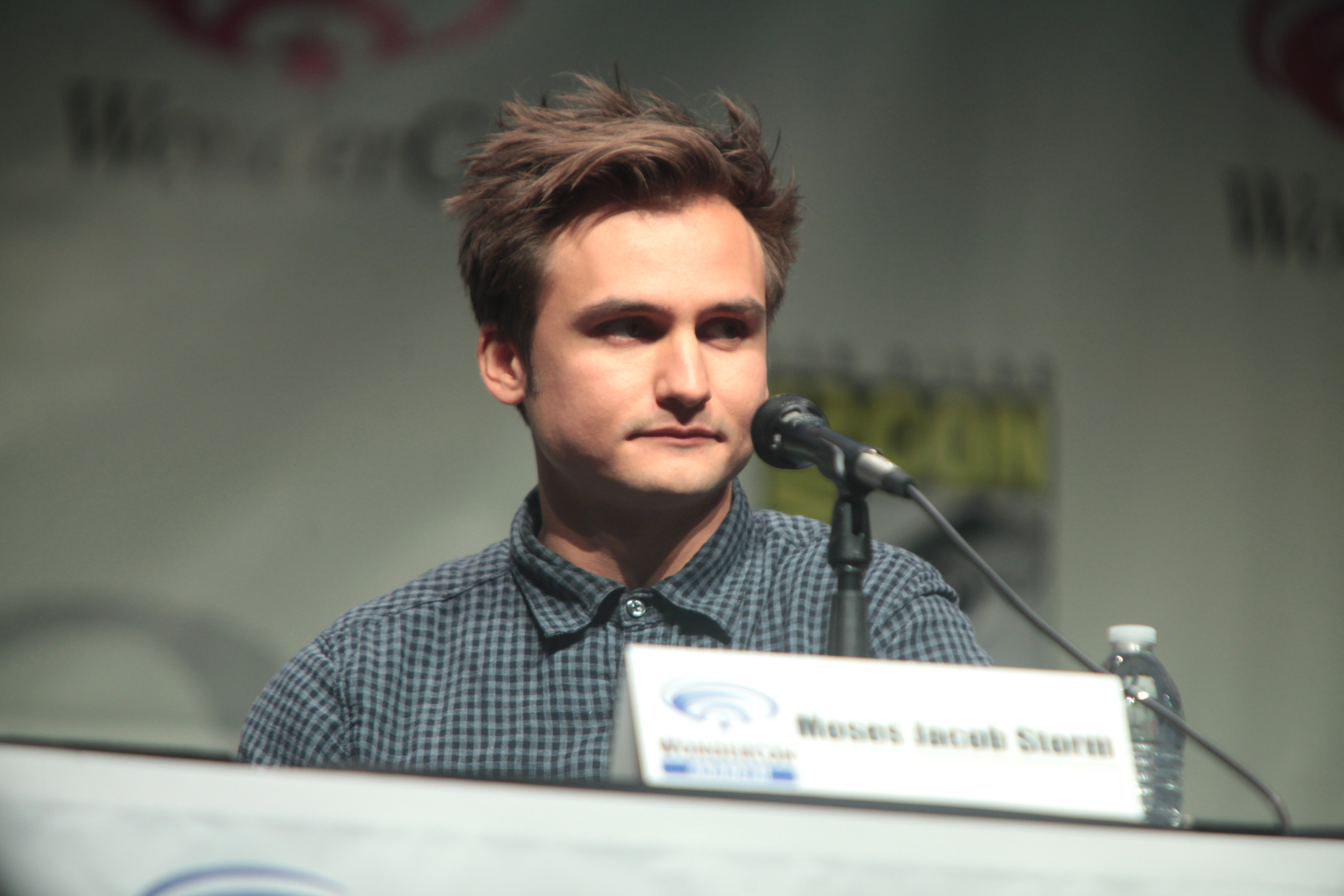
- Born: Moses Jacob Storm; May 6, 1990 (age 36); Kalamazoo, Michigan, U.S.
- Relatives: Michael Woroniecki (uncle)

Comedy career
- Medium: Stand-up, television, film, writing
- Genres: Observational comedy, sarcasm, satire
- Subjects: Popular culture, current events
- Website: mosesstorm.com

Moses Jacob Storm (born May 6, 1990) is an American writer, actor, comedian, and performance artist who has appeared in film, television and radio.

== Early life ==
Moses Storm was born in Kalamazoo, Michigan, and is one of five children. Raised by his parents on a converted Greyhound bus, he and his siblings primarily received homeschooling from their mother.

During his early years, Storm's family was part of a non-denominational religious sect led by his uncle, Michael Woroniecki, known as "The Way." They traveled from town to town, preaching at state fairs and music festivals.

Storm attended one semester of community college for video production but left to pursue performing in Los Angeles. After initially taking a cleaning job in the city, Storm became a comedian when he recognized his talent and passion for the craft."

== Career ==
=== Comedy ===
Storm is an alumnus of the UCB Theatre and currently hosts a live program called Trifecta alongside Ify Nwadiwe and Christian Spicer at the UCB Theatre Sunset venue. He co-hosted and produced a bimonthly show on the Nerdist stage at Meltdown Comics called This Show is Your Show!, which LA Weekly in their "Best Of" section as "Best Comedy Show".

Storm has performed stand-up on Last Comic Standing and Conan. He accompanied Conan O'Brien, as well as Ron Funches, Laurie Kilmartin, and Flula Borg on select dates for O'Brien's limited "Conan & Friends: An Evening of Stand-Up and Investment Tips" tour in late 2018. Storm has also performed alongside Jo Firestone at the Toronto Comedy Festival for SiriusXM's JFL42 program. In the same year, Storm performed a show at The Kennedy Center and at the 2018 SF Sketchfest in shows with Fred Armisen and Jacqueline Novak.

On January 20, 2022, Storm debuted in his own comedy special on HBO Max, "Trash White," produced by Conan O'Brien.

Storm recited a monologue for The Moth titled "It Pays to Be Poor" and was awarded the title of The Moth GrandSLAM Champion.

=== Acting ===
In television, Storm has portrayed various characters in projects such as The 4 to 9ers, Another Period, Youth and Consequences, About a Boy, This is Us, and Arrested Development. He also appeared in the Comedy Central Originals one-off special Ice to Iceland. In 2019, Storm starred as one of the leads in NBC sitcom Sunnyside, portraying the character Bojan/Brady. His performance added to the ensemble cast of the show.

Storm received critical acclaim for his role as Mitch Roussel in the 2014 horror film Unfriended.

=== Performance art ===
In 2014, Storm presented The Modern Millennial, an immersive theater performance piece funded on Kickstarter. The crowdfunding paid for a loft space in Los Angeles where audiences could observe Storm's day-to-day life. The space also featured art exhibits by Storm.

== Filmography ==
=== Film ===
Year	Title	Role	Notes
2014	The Great American Comedy Tour	John-O	Short film
2014	Unfriended	Mitch Roussel	
2015	Wrestling Isn't Wrestling	Friend watching GOT	Short documentary film
2016	The Wedding Party	Skyler	
2018	Father of the Year	Trey	
2020	Bad Hair	Executive Justin	
2020	The Lovebirds	Steve	
2021	Plan B	Andy	
2023	Fool's Paradise	Junior	

=== Television ===
Year	Title	Role	Notes
2011	No Ordinary Family	Student #2	Episode: "No Ordinary Friends"
2012	All the Wrong Notes	Eddie	Episode: "Everybody Haunts"
2012	The 4 to 9ers	Seth	Television film
2012	Sketchy	Dean	Guest Role; 2 episodes
2013	Stevie TV	Stevie's Brother	Episode: #2.1
2014	About a Boy	CJ	Episode: "A Christmas Card"
2014	The 4 to 9ers: The Day Crew	Seth	Main role; 5 episodes
2014	Correcting Christmas	Jason	Television film
2016	Another Period	Strom	Episode: "Harvard"
2016	Small Victories	Scooter	Television film
2017	Ryan Hansen Solves Crimes on Television	Griff	Episode: "Hungry for Justice"
2018	Youth & Consequences	Hook	Television mini-series
2018	Arrested Development	Shane	Recurring role; 2 episodes
2018	I'm Dying Up Here	Brendan Sibler	Episode: "Now You See Me, Now You Don't"
2018	The Jim Jefferies Show	Correspondent	Episode: "Third-Party Debate: The Best of the Rest"
2018	This Is Us	Squirrel Watterson	Recurring role; 2 episodes
2019	Sunnyside	Brady	Main role; 11 episodes
2022	Players	Guru	Recurring role; 10 episodes
