= Edge of space (disambiguation) =

Edge of space refers to the Kármán line, an altitude of 100 km above mean sea level.

Edge of space or Edge of Space may also refer to:

- Space boundary, the transition between Earth's atmosphere and outer space
- Edge of Space, 2024 Swiss-American short film
- The Edge Of Space, sub-show of Starstuff, children's TV program
