= On-set virtual production =

Technology for television and film production

On-set virtual production (OSVP) (Note: Also known as virtual production (VP), immersive virtual production (IVP), virtual production technology (VPT), or In-Camera Visual Effects (ICVFX), and often called The Volume.) is an entertainment technology for television and film production in which LED panels are used as a backdrop for a set, on which video or computer-generated imagery can be displayed in real-time. The use of OSVP became widespread after its use in the first season of The Mandalorian (2019), which used Unreal Engine, developed by Epic Games. The technology replaces green screen compositing by displaying pre-recorded background plates on the LED wall, which allows actors to see the environment and provides interactive lighting.

== History ==
Australian film director Clayton Jacobson first had the idea of improving the green screen that was then in use when filming a TV ad for detergent in 2003. Watching his son playing videogames and seeing the 3D technology used in them gave him the idea. Eventually, in 2016, Jacobson and his son made one of the prototypes for a virtual production stage in their shed, using a set of LED screens. However, he could not get anyone to take an interest in developing the technology further, so gave up on it. In 2017, PRG presidents Brian Edwards partnered with cinematographer Markus Förderer and producers Giuseppe Mercadante and Jean de Meuron to showcase OverDrive, their On-set virtual production LED wall panel technology on the set of Megan (2018 film). The technology replaced green screen compositing by displaying pre-recorded background plates on the LED wall. This allowed actors to see the environment in which the scene was taking place, improving immersion and reducing the need to imagine backgrounds that would otherwise be added in post-production. The LED panels also provided interactive lighting, casting colors, reflections, and atmospheric effects directly onto the actors, costumes, props, and physical sets. This helped prevent common green-screen issues, such as green spill reflecting onto skin or reflective surfaces, while giving cinematographers a more accurate view of the final image during filming. Other filmmakers had also caught on to the idea though, and in 2018 an Australian cinematographer, Greig Fraser, used the technology to film the Star Wars franchise spin-off series, The Mandalorian (released 2019). Instead of using the green screen during the filming stage, the team combined post-production with the production stage of the series. They installed huge LED walls linked to powerful computers that ran Unreal Engine gaming software (used for Fortnite, among others). They called this soundstage "the volume", a term already used to refer to a stage where visual effects techniques take place.

Since its inventive use in The Mandalorian, which used ILM's StageCraft, the technology has become increasingly popular. Miles Perkins, industry manager of film and TV for Epic Games and maker of the Unreal Engine, estimated that there were around 300 stages by October 2022, increased from only three in 2019. Most of these were built during or after the COVID-19 pandemic, when lockdowns meant that production studios had to find ways to produce films without traveling to other locations.

In March 2023, the world's largest virtual production stage was opened at the Docklands Studios Melbourne, in the city of Melbourne, Australia.

== Terminology ==
On-set virtual production (OSVP) is also known as virtual production (VP), immersive virtual production (IVP), In-Camera Visual Effects (ICVFX), or The Volume.

== Technology ==
With careful adjustment and calibration, an OSVP set can be made to closely approximate the appearance of a real set or outdoor location. OSVP can be viewed as an application of extended reality. OSVP contrasts with virtual studio technology, in which a green screen backdrop surrounds the set, and the virtual surroundings are composited into the green screen plate downstream from the camera, in that in OSVP the virtual world surrounding the set is visible to the camera, actors, and crew, and objects on set are illuminated by light from the LED screen, creating realistic interactive lighting effects, and that the virtual background and foreground are captured directly in camera, complete with natural subtle cues like lens distortion, depth of field effects, bokeh and lens flare. This makes it a far more natural experience that more closely approximates location shooting, making the film-making process faster and more intuitive than can be achieved on a virtual set.

To render parallax depth cues correctly from the viewpoint of a moving camera, the system requires the use of match moving of the background imagery based on data from low-latency real-time motion capture technology to track the camera, such systems as Stype and Mosys which track camera position within the volume and equate this position within the Unreal scene - so that any movement is reflected within the scene as well .

Industry organizations including SMPTE, the Academy of Motion Picture Arts and Sciences, and the American Society of Cinematographers have started initiatives to support the development of OSVP.

== Examples ==
Stages that use OSVP include the various StageCraft stages, Pixomondo's Toronto-based LED stage, which has a long-term lease from CBS, ZeroSpace's Volume in New York City, or Lux Machina various stages. In Japan, the LED wall and virtual production were used by Toei Company for its Super Sentai shows Avataro Sentai Donbrothers and Ohsama Sentai King-Ohger, with the latter also being produced in collaboration with Sony PCL Inc. Toronto's Dark Slope Studios is the home of Virtual Production shots for Heated Rivalry, Gen V and BET. Italy's Cinecittà Studios in Rome features a LED wall that is 167 feet in circumference and 26 feet tall. Roland Emmerich's TV series Those About to Die was shot at this location.

== Productions using the technologies ==
=== Television series ===
- The Mandalorian (2019–2023)
- The Book of Boba Fett (2021-2022)
- Star Trek: Discovery (2021–2024)
- Avataro Sentai Donbrothers (2022–2023)
- Star Trek: Strange New Worlds (2022–present)
- How I Met Your Father (2022–2023)
- Our Flag Means Death (2022–2024)
- Obi-Wan Kenobi (2022)
- The Old Man (2022)
- Westworld (2022)
- Andor (2022–2025)
- The Lord of the Rings: The Rings of Power (2022–present)
- House of the Dragon (2022–present)
- 1899 (2022)
- The Santa Clauses (2022–2023)
- Ohsama Sentai King-Ohger (2023–2024)
- Silo (2023)
- The Muppets Mayhem (2023)
- Ahsoka (2023–present)
- One Piece (2023–present)
- YuYu Hakusho (2023)
- Percy Jackson and the Olympians (2023–present)
- Masters of the Air (2024)
- Fallout (2024–present)
- Doctor Who series 14 (2024)
- The Acolyte (2024)
- Those About to Die (2024)
- Time Bandits (2024)
- Star Wars: Skeleton Crew (2024–2025)
- The Eternaut (2025)
- Murderbot (2025)
- Wednesday (2025–present)
- Gen V (2025)
- It: Welcome to Derry (2025–present)
- Heated Rivalry (2025-present)
- Hate the Player: The Ben Johnson Story (2026)

=== Feature films ===
- Avatar (2009)
- Oblivion (2013)
- Interstellar (2014)
- The Jungle Book (2016)
- Rogue One: A Star Wars Story (2016)
- Ghost in the Shell (2017)
- Solo: A Star Wars Story (2018)
- First Man (2018)
- Alita: Battle Angel (2019)
- The Lion King (2019)
- The Irishman (2019)
- Star Wars: The Rise of Skywalker (2019)
- The One and Only Ivan (2020)
- The Midnight Sky (2020)
- In vacanza su Marte (2020)
- Venom: Let There Be Carnage (2021)
- Red Notice (2021)
- Don't Look Up (2021)
- Death on the Nile (2022)
- The Batman (2022)
- Top Gun: Maverick (2022)
- Thor: Love and Thunder (2022)
- The Gray Man (2022)
- Bullet Train (2022)
- Pinocchio (2022)
- Divinity (2022)
- Black Adam (2022)
- Devotion (2022)
- The Fabelmans (2022)
- Avatar: The Way of Water (2022)
- Ant-Man and the Wasp: Quantumania (2023)
- Shazam! Fury of the Gods (2023)
- The Pope's Exorcist (2023)
- The Flash (2023)
- Barbie (2023)
- Gran Turismo (2023)
- The Creator (2023)
- Retribution (2023)
- The Killer (2023)
- The Marvels (2023)
- Candy Cane Lane (2023)
- Poor Things (2023)
- Society of the Snow (2023)
- Aquaman and the Lost Kingdom (2023)
- No Way Up (2024)
- Dune: Part Two (2024)
- Godzilla x Kong: The New Empire (2024)
- Daddio (2024)
- Transformers One (2024)
- Megalopolis (2024)
- Joker: Folie à Deux (2024)
- Venom: The Last Dance (2024)
- Here (2024)
- Paddington in Peru (2024)
- Red One (2024)
- Wicked: Part One (2024)
- Mufasa: The Lion King (2024)
- Snow White (2025)
- A Minecraft Movie (2025)
- Final Destination Bloodlines (2025)
- How to Train Your Dragon (2025)
- Superman (2025)
- Happy Gilmore 2 (2025)
- A Big Bold Beautiful Journey (2025)
- The Lost Bus (2025)
- Tron: Ares (2025)
- Avatar: Fire and Ash (2025)
- Mercy (2026)
- Project Hail Mary (2026)
- The Mandalorian and Grogu (2026)
- Disclosure Day (2026)
- Moana (2026)
- Play Dead (TBD)

=== Short films ===
- Megan (2018)
- The Vandal (2021)
- The Shepherd (2023)

== See also ==
- Cinematic virtual reality
- Entertainment technology
- Extended reality
- Holodeck
- Virtual camera system
- Virtual cinematography
