= Pigeons (2026 film) =

2026 Swiss-American animated short film

- Directed by: Amos Sussigan
- Written by: Julien M. Wagner; Timo von Gunten; Amos Sussigan
- Produced by: Amos Sussigan; Timo von Gunten; Samira Sahli; Dan Lund
- Narrated by: Andy Serkis
- Edited by: Ryan Burkhard; Damian Derungs; Noa Röthlisberger
- Music by: Michael Künstle; Matteo Pagamici
- Production companies: The Hub Media; BMC Films
- Release date: 8 May 2026 (Animayo International Film Festival of Animation)
- Running time: 12 minutes
- Countries: Switzerland; United States
- Language: English

Pigeons is a 2026 Swiss-American animated short film directed by Amos Sussigan from a screenplay by Julien M. Wagner, Timo von Gunten and Sussigan. Narrated by Andy Serkis, the film follows a carrier pigeon searching for purpose after losing his job.

The film had its world premiere in competition as an Official Selection at the Academy Awards qualifying Animayo | Summit, Conference and International Film Festival of Animation 2026, where it won Best Production Design.

== Premise ==
The film follows a carrier pigeon whose role is made obsolete when a telephone is installed in his owner's home. As he searches for food, shelter, and a new purpose, he moves through a changing world shaped by technological progress.

== Cast ==
- Andy Serkis as The Narrator

== Production ==
Pigeons was directed by Amos Sussigan. The screenplay was written by Julien M. Wagner, Timo von Gunten and Sussigan. The film was produced by Sussigan, von Gunten, Samira Sahli and Dan Lund, with Andy Serkis, Bianca Marrocco and Jean de Meuron serving as Executive Producers.

Pigeons marked the third collaboration between Sussigan and producer Dan Lund, following the Academy Awards qualified animated shorts Aria for a Cow (2015) and Coaster (2019), starring Nina West. According to director Sussigan, approximately 45 artists from multiple countries contributed to the production over the course of one year.

The animated short was created with no studio financing and features more than 170 hand-painted backgrounds. Sergio Mancinelli served as art director, Peter Staubli as sound designer and re-recording mixer, Shane Harris as senior colorist, while Ryan Burkhard, Damian Derungs and Noa Röthlisberger edited the film. Michael Künstle and Matteo Pagamici are the composers.

== Release ==
Pigeons had its world premiere at Animayo | Summit, Conference and International Film Festival of Animation 2026 in Gran Canaria, Spain, on May 8, 2026.

The animated short had its US premiere at the Oscar and BAFTA qualifying Heartland International Film Festival (Indy Shorts) on July 26, 2026.

The film was also selected for competition at the HollyShorts Film Festival, Flickers' Rhode Island International Film Festival and Fantoche.

== Accolades ==
Year	Award	Category	Result
2026	Animayo International Film Festival of Animation	Best Production Design	Won
