= Red Clover (film) =

2012 television film

- DVD cover and poster reflecting the current title of the film
- Written by: Anthony C. Ferrante
- Directed by: Drew Daywalt
- Starring: Billy Zane; Courtney Halverson; William Devane
- Theme music composer: Gregory S. Burkart
- Country of origin: United States
- Original language: English

Production
- Producer: Anthony C. Ferrante
- Cinematography: Robert Morris
- Editor: Asaf Eisenberg
- Running time: 90 minutes
- Production company: After Dark Films

Original release
- Network: Syfy
- Release: March 17, 2012

Red Clover (also known as Leprechaun's Revenge and St. Patrick's Day Leprechaun) is a 2012 made for television horror film directed by Drew Daywalt. The movie was originally made under the title Red Clover, but was changed to Leprechaun's Revenge for a March 17, 2012 television release on the Syfy Channel. The title was switched back to Red Clover for its 2013 DVD release. Red Clover stars Billy Zane as a Massachusetts sheriff who must save his town from a homicidal leprechaun.

== Plot ==
Set in the fictional town of Keening, Massachusetts, the movie follows Karen O'Hara (Courtney Halverson), a young woman who is largely unaware of the town's true bloody past. About sixty-six years ago, a horrific massacre devastated the town, and since that time the town has decided to forgo any St. Patrick's Day festivities. The town managed to temporarily rid themselves of the killer, a bloodthirsty leprechaun, by sending it to another dimension by way of an old book. However, Karen accidentally sets the monster free one day while she is out hunting. The leprechaun immediately sets about killing several people, but Karen's father, Sheriff Connor O'Hara (Billy Zane), is unwilling to believe 'Pops' O'Hara's (William Devane) claims that the murders are perpetuated by a supposedly mythical being.

== Cast ==
- Billy Zane as Sheriff Connor O'Hara
- Courtney Halverson as Karen O'Hara
- William Devane as "Pops" O'Hara
- Dave Randolph-Mayhem Davis as Dax Spence (credited as Dave Davis)
- Kevin Mangold as The Leprechaun
- Azure Parsons as Officer Jen Peterson
- Kelly Washington as Amanda McHenry
- Derek Babb as Josh
- Chase Boltin as Ben
- Joseph Randy Causin as Parade Goer
- Danny Cosmo as Leprechaun Man
- Matty Ferraro as Tannen
- Andrea Frankle as Mrs. Jones
- Emily D. Haley as Parade Fan
- Karl Herlinger as Karl Morris
- Kent Jude Bernard as Enos
- Gabriel Jarret as Harris
- Thomas Francis Murphy as Dr. McCormick
- Dane Rhodes as Wally "Happy" O'Shannon
- Glen Warner as Green Face Man (uncredited)

== Production ==
Daywalt began working on Red Clover while developing another project with After Dark, who had asked him to direct for them after viewing some of his other work. During the development of the film, writer Ferrante wanted to make the leprechaun character "creepy and organic" and wanted to avoid the typical clothing associated with St. Patrick’s Day. One of the weapons used in the film, a staff with four sharpened horseshoes on it, was developed after Ferrante joked that they could call the movie "Four-Leaf Cleaver". Filming took place in Baton Rouge, Louisiana.

== Reception ==
Critical reception for Red Clover under its original name and its DVD release were mixed to negative. Comparisons were made to the Leprechaun film series and the movie's plot was one of the most commonly criticized elements of Red Clover. At the same time, several reviewers acknowledged that the film had some entertainment value as a B movie. DVD Verdict gave a mixed review, stating that "this isn't as plainly awful as almost everything that airs on that network, but that doesn't mean it's very good, either". In contrast, the review from HorrorNews.net was largely positive, praising the movie's dialogue and acting.
