= Mermaid (2025 film) =

- Theatrical release poster
- Directed by: Tyler Cornack
- Written by: Tyler Cornack
- Produced by: Daniel Brandt; Dan Eckerle; Cole Eckerle
- Starring: Johnny Pemberton; Avery Potemri; Kevin Nealon; Kirk Fox; Tom Arnold; Robert Patrick; Kevin Dunn
- Cinematography: Joel Lavold
- Edited by: Cole Eckerle
- Music by: Tyler Cornack
- Production company: Bad Grey
- Distributed by: Utopia
- Release dates: March 11, 2025 (SXSW); May 8, 2026 (United States)
- Running time: 105 minutes
- Country: United States
- Language: English

Mermaid is a 2025 American action comedy horror thriller film written and directed by Tyler Cornack. The film stars Johnny Pemberton as a troubled Florida man who discovers an injured mermaid and attempts to protect her. The cast also includes Kevin Nealon, Avery Potemri, Kirk Fox, Tom Arnold, Devyn McDowell, Julia Valentine Larson, Robert Patrick, and Kevin Dunn.

The film premiered at the South by Southwest (SXSW) Film Festival on March 11, 2025. Following its festival debut, Utopia acquired North American distribution rights. The film was released theatrically in the United States on May 8, 2026.

== Plot ==
Off the coast of Fort Lauderdale, a motoryacht owner spends his night celebrating his recent divorce when a noise lures him to his tarp-covered liferaft at the bow. When he finds a monstrous creature under the tarp, he reflexively shoots it, but then another creature appears and kills him.

Doug Nelson, a divorced Lauderdale resident struggling with a drug addiction and lack of social grace with women, is fired from his job at a strip club, and his drug supplier Ron Bocca and his son "Gator" poison his pet fish after Doug fails to pay up for the latest delivery. At his lowest, Doug rides out to sea and prepares to commit suicide when he discovers a wounded mermaid floating in the water. He takes her to his home, shelters her in his bathtub and treats her injuries. Despite her feral nature, he develops a liking to the mermaid, calls her Destiny, and begins "dating" her, even taking her out in disguise and a wheelchair, which disturbs his few remaining social contacts.

After taking Destiny to his daughter's birthday party, which ends disastrously when Destiny spews black slime all over the place, another mercreature invades Doug's house and attacks him, but he drives it away. The next night, while Doug is in town, Ron and Gator discover Destiny in Doug's house, kidnap her and take her to Doug's former workplace to auction her off to their wealthy clientele. When Doug discovers this, he determinedly follows them and invades the club, but Gator tranquilizes him. With his consciousness fading, Doug electro-shocks Gator and drops him into Destiny's water tank, where she kills Gator.

When Doug wakes up again, he finds that Ron has managed to sell off Destiny despite the deadly incident. Ron takes Doug on his motoryacht into the open water, where he prepares to kill him, but having consumed heroin beforehand, he is unable to fight back properly when Doug recovers, is thrown overboard and drowns. Commandeering Ron's boat, Doug invades the yacht of James Morris, the millionaire who purchased Destiny, and finds him eating pieces of her flesh while she is still alive. Morris dares Doug to shoot him, but instead the second mercreature, summoned by Destiny's cries of agony, boards the ship and mauls Morris to death. Afterwards, Doug frees Destiny, and with his newly discovered dignity, he throws his drug supplies overboard and drives off on Ron's motoryacht.

== Cast ==
- Johnny Pemberton as Doug Nelson
- Avery Potemri as Destiny, a mermaid
- Kevin Nealon as Keith
- Kirk Fox as Skip, owner of a strip club
- Tom Arnold as Todd
- Devyn McDowell as Layla, Doug's daughter
- Julia Valentine Larson as Tina
- Robert Patrick as Ron Bocca
- Tyler Rice as Gator Bocca
- Kevin Dunn as James Morris

== Production ==
The film was written and directed by Tyler Cornack. It was produced by Daniel Brandt, Dane Eckerle, and Cole Eckerle through the production company Bad Grey.

Principal photography took place prior to its 2025 festival premiere. The film blends elements of action, comedy, horror, and thriller genres.

== Release ==
Mermaid premiered at the South by Southwest Film Festival on March 11, 2025, as part of the Narrative Spotlight section. Following its festival debut, the independent distributor Utopia acquired North American distribution rights to the film. The film was released theatrically in the United States on May 8, 2026.

== Reception ==
On the review aggregator website Rotten Tomatoes, 91% of 22 critics' reviews are positive. Metacritic, which uses a weighted average, assigned the film a score of 49 out of 100, based on 4 critics, indicating "mixed or average" reviews.

Critical response following the film's festival screenings noted its unconventional premise and genre-blending approach. In a review from Variety, the film was described as a surreal Florida-set creature story centered on an unstable protagonist who forms a bond with a wounded mermaid.

ScreenAnarchy described the film as an absurdist comedy that blends elements of crime thriller and creature feature, noting that its unusual tone and dark humor may divide audiences while appealing to viewers receptive to its offbeat style.

Coverage of the film's SXSW premiere highlighted Johnny Pemberton’s performance and the film's unusual blend of dark comedy and creature-feature elements.
