= Kirk Fox =

American actor

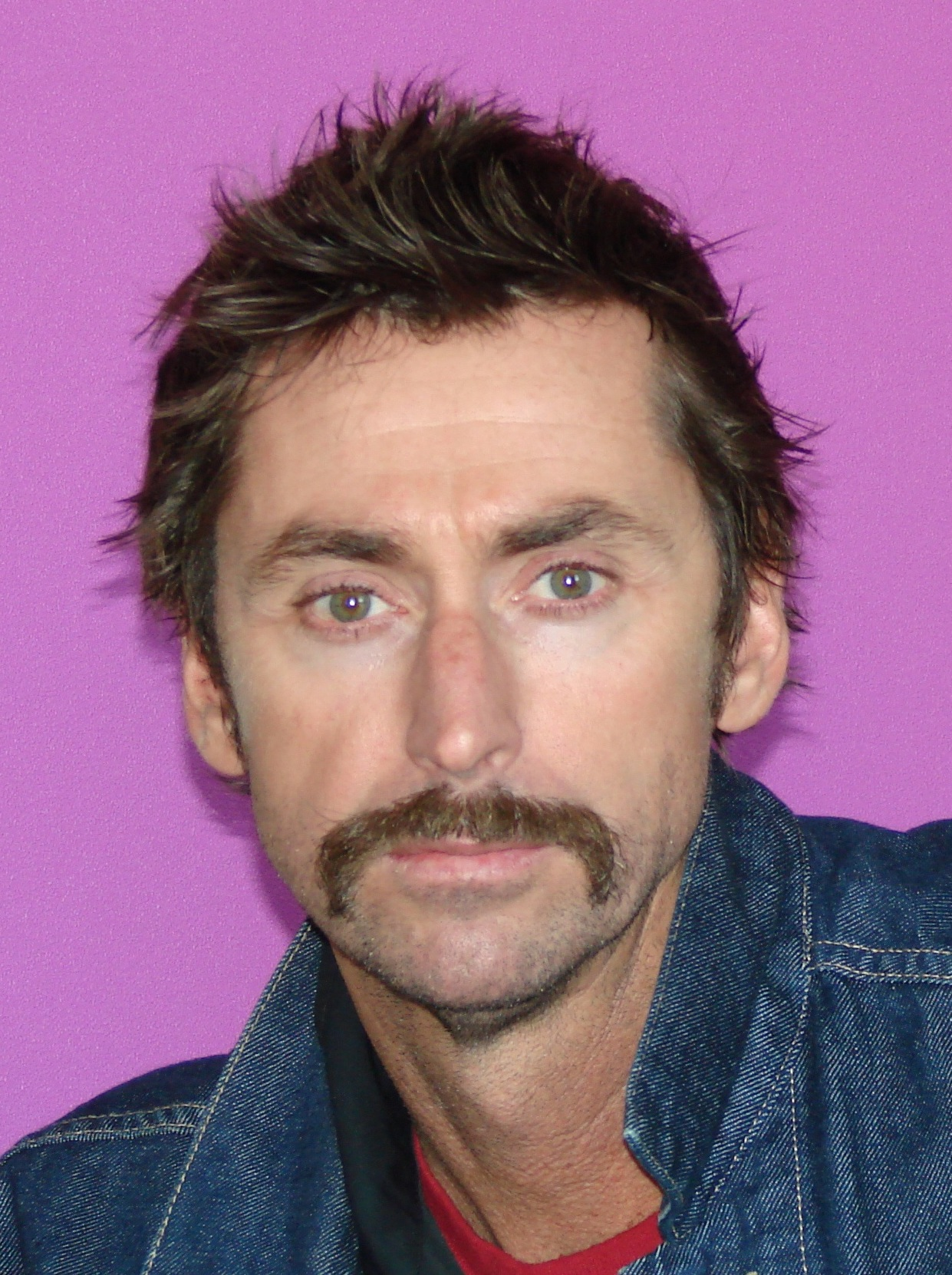
- Occupations: Actor; screenwriter; comedian
- Years active: 1993–present
- Spouses: Alison Eastwood (m. 1999; div. 2000) Jaren Boczan (m. 2017)
- Children: 1

Kirk Fox is an American actor, screenwriter, and stand-up comedian. He played Mr. March in How to Rock and Kenny Boy in Reservation Dogs.

== Career ==
=== Television ===
Fox played Sewage Joe on Parks and Recreation and was a regular on Nickelodeon's How to Rock as Mr. March. Other credits include Community on NBC, Who Gets the Last Laugh? on TBS, Reservation Dogs on FX/Hulu, and Brooklyn Nine-Nine on Fox.

From 2013 to May 2014, Fox hosted CBS TV Distribution's syndicated daytime talk show The Test.

In 2023, Fox starred as juror Pat McCurdy in Lee Eisenberg and Gene Stupnitsky's Peabody Award-winning docu-comedy television series Jury Duty, which premiered on Amazon Freevee on April 7, 2023.

=== Web series ===
In 2009, Fox and Owen Benjamin starred in Heckle U.

In 2012 and 2013, Fox starred as Melinda Hill's suitor in the first and ninth episodes of Romantic Encounters.

=== Stand-up comedy ===
Fox started doing stand up comedy in 2002. In 2005, Fox co-wrote and co-starred in the comedy Tennis Anyone? with Donal Logue. On August 11, 2006, he made his television standup debut on Comedy Central's Live at Gotham and in 2007 received the Jury Prize for best standup at the HBO Comedy Festival in Aspen, Colorado. In March 2008 he was featured in his own 1/2 hour special on Comedy Central: Comedy Central Presents: Kirk Fox. He appeared on The Tonight Show with Jay Leno in December 2008 and May 2009.

== Personal life ==
Fox was married to Alison Eastwood. They later divorced. Fox married Jaren Boczan in 2017. They have a daughter born in 2018.

== Filmography ==
=== Film ===
Year	Title	Role	Note
1993	Treacherous	Enforcer	
1994	Wyatt Earp	Pete Spence	
1994	In the Army Now	Corporal	
1996	Criminal Hearts	Arizona Highway patrol officer	
1996	The Trigger Effect	Drugstore Announcer	
1996	Infinity	Mechanic	
1997	The Postman	Gangly Recruit	
1999	Crazy in Alabama	Patrolman	
1999	Mumford	Gregory	
2000	The Patriot	Skunk	
2000	The Right Temptation	Sharpshooter	
2002	City of Ghosts	FBI Agent Philps	
2003	Pauly Shore Is Dead	Kirk	Also writer
2003	Manfast	Kirk	
2005	Tennis, Anyone...?	Gary Morgan	Also writer and producer
2007	Natural Born Komics		Voice role
2008	Forgetting Sarah Marshall	Mixer	
2009	The Lodger	LAPD Officer #3	
2009	Still Waiting...	Hank	
2009	Heart Too Tender	Bob	Short film
2009	Post Grad	Buckle-O-Bill	
2010	How to Make Love to a Woman	Gil	
2010	Group Sex	Sex Addict #1	
2011	Let Go	Paul	
2012	Any Day Now	Beaux	
2013	Fake Dog Shit	The Manager	Short film
2019	Tow Zone	Phil	Short film
2020	Bulletproof 2	Archie Kelso	
2024	Max Dagan	Sergeant Clark	
2025	Mermaid	Skip	
2026	Busboys	Rocky	

=== Television ===
Year	Title	Role	Note
1997	The Burning Zone	Carny	Episode; "A Secret in the Neighborhood"
1998	Nash Bridges	Ricky Allan Klinsman	Episode; "Hot Prowler"
1999	Martial Law	Marcus	Episode; "Substitutes"
2000	The Pretender	Huey	Episode; "Junk"
2005	Deadwood	Charlie Manuel	Episode; "Childish Things"
2006	Live at Gotham		
2006	Grand Union	Joey McBride	Television movie
2008	Comedy Central Presents: Kirk Fox	Himself	
2008	Gaytown		Television movie
2009-2011	In Gayle We Trust	Jack Stumpfle	9 episodes
2009-2013	Parks and Recreation	Joe	8 episodes
2009	Paris Hilton's My New BFF	Himself	
2009	The Tonight Show with Jay Leno	Himself	
2009	Heckle U	Darrell Downing	8 episodes
2009	Reno 911!	Gary Morgan	Episode; "The Midnight Swingers"
2010-2011	Svetlana	Eddie	4 epsides
2010	Terriers	Carter	4 epsides
2012	How to Rock	Mr. March	Recurring role; 12 episodes
2012	Community	Blade	Episode; "Origins of Vampire Mythology"
2012	Figure It Out	Himself	3 episodes
2016	The Carmichael Show	Landlord	Episode; "Gentrifying Bobby"
2016	Rush Hour	Donovan	10 episodes
2017-2018	The Mick	Loan Shark	2 episode
2018	Brooklyn Nine-Nine	Kurt	Episode; "DFW"
2018	NCIS	Rod Carmale	Episode; "Beneath the Surface"
2019-2020	Briarpatch (TV series)	Sid	6 episodes
2020	Dress Up Gang	Fox	5 episodes
2020-2021	Black Monday	Blair's Dad	2 episodes
2021	Curb Your Enthusiasm	Contest Mc	Episode; "The Mini Bar"
2021-2023	Reservation Dogs	Kenny Boy	8 episodes
2023	Jury Duty	Pat McCurdy	8 episodes
2025	Bad Thoughts	Roger	Episode; "Success"
2026	The Lowdown	Jeff Morgan	2 epsiodes

== Awards and nominations ==
Award	Year	Category	Nominated work	Result	Ref.
Film Independent Spirit Awards	2024	Best Ensemble Cast in a New Scripted Series	Jury Duty	Won	
