= Courtney Halverson =

American actress

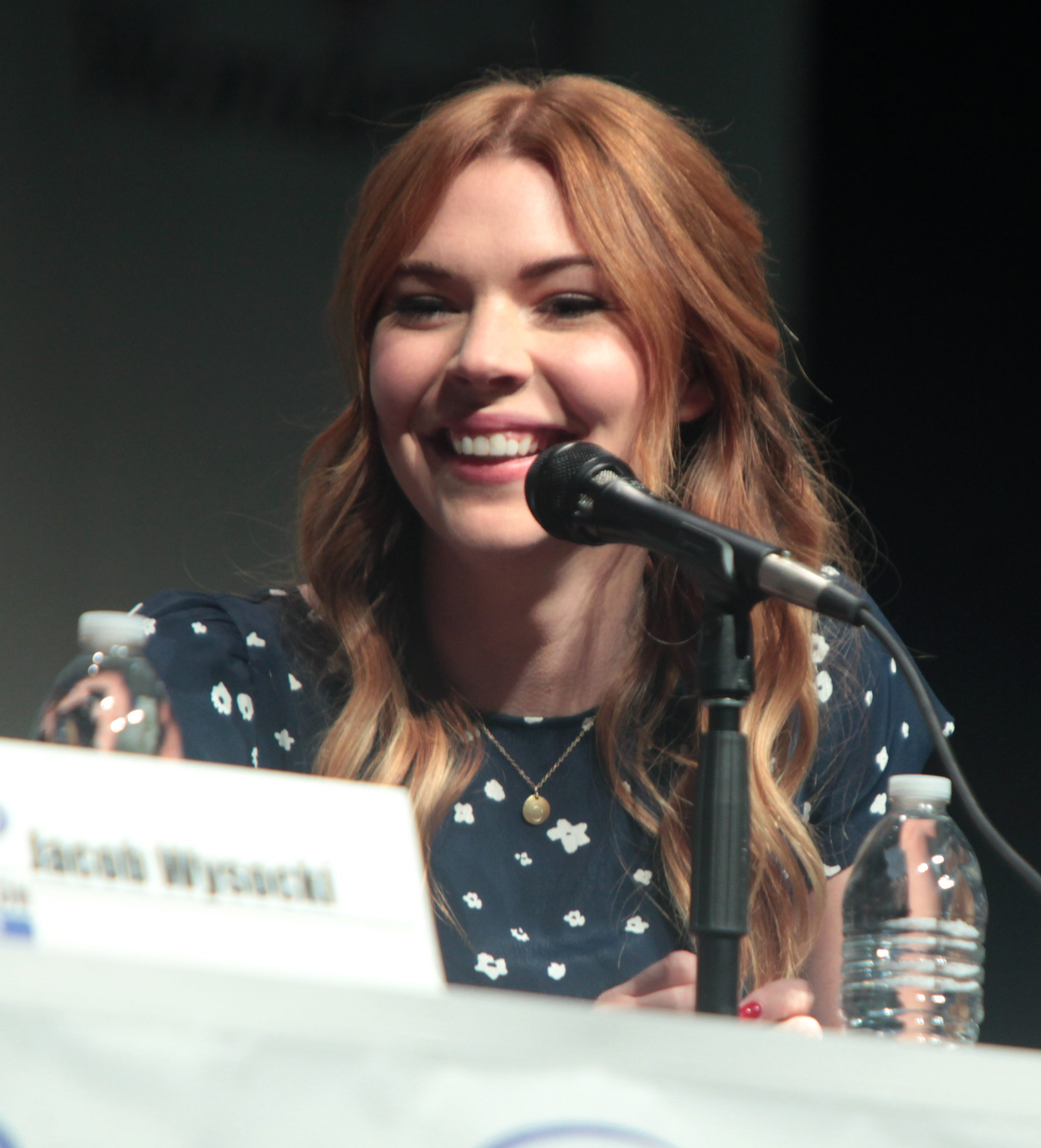
- Halverson speaking at WonderCon 2015
- Born: June 14, 1989 (age 37); Orange County, California
- Occupation: Actress
- Years active: 2003–present

Courtney Halverson (born June 14, 1989) is an American actress.

== Life and career ==
Courtney Halverson was born in Orange County, California, and graduated from high school at the age of 15.

She has been nominated twice for a Young Artist Award, once in 2006 for A Distant Shore and again in 2007 for Sleepwalk. She also starred in the thriller films Leprechaun's Revenge, The Hammer and Unfriended.

== Filmography ==
=== Film ===
Year	Title	Role	Notes
2003	Rogues	Sarah Moore	
2004	Hold the Rice	Lola Baunum	Short film
2005	The Phone Ranger	Sarah	Short film
2005	A Distant Shore	Theda McNeil	Short film
2006	Apology	Teenage Sarah	Short film
2006	Sleepwalk	Vicky	Short film
2006	Freaky Faron	Faron Hallowell	
2007	Feedback	Lilly	Short film
2009	Etienne!	Tara	
2009	Godspeed	Sarah Roberts	
2010	The Hammer	Michelle	
2014	Unfriended	Valerie "Val" Rommel	
2015	1915	"Lucky"	
2015	Forever	Nina	
2016	Debt	Unknown	Short film
2018	St. Agatha	Catherine	
2024	Consumed	Beth	

=== Television ===
Year	Title	Role	Notes
2005	Check This Kid Out	Narrator	TV series
2005	Ned's Declassified School Survival Guide	Student Passing Note	Episode: "Notes & Best Friends"
2007	America's Most Wanted	Meghan Brown	Episode: "Tanya Diane Brown"
2008	Rita Rocks	Lindsey	Episode: "Under Pressure"
2008	Gigantic	Nikki Diamond	TV series
2009	Ghost Whisperer	Young Lauren	Episode: "Greek Tragedy"
2009	Big Love	Nuss	Episodes: "Empire" and "For Better or for Worse"
2009	Love Finds a Home	Lillian	Television film
2011	Death Valley	Natalie	Recurring role; 5 episodes
2012	Red Clover	Karen O'Hara	Television film
2013	The Secret Life of the American Teenager	Waitress	Episode: "Shiny and New"
2013	General Hospital	Anna Donely	Guest role; 2 episodes
2015	True Detective	Erica Jonson	Episodes: "The Western Book of the Dead", "Maybe Tomorrow" and "Omega Station"
2016	Murder in the First	Stacie Bader	Episode: "Sam I Am"
2016	Criminal Minds	Cherry Rollins	Episode: "Scarecrow"

=== Music videos ===
Year	Song	Artist	Role	Ref
2005	"To All Of You"	Syd Matters	All-American Girl	
