= Reel Shorts Film Festival =

Annual short film festival in Alberta, Canada

- Location: Grande Prairie, Alberta, Canada
- Hosted by: Reel Shorts Film Society
- No. of films: 80+
- Language: International
- Website: http://reelshorts.ca

The Reel Shorts Film Festival, held annually in Grande Prairie, Alberta since 2007, is recognized as one of North America's best short film festivals. Its programming focus is short-form cinematic storytelling, screening "gems of storytelling brilliance" from around the world, across Canada, and in the Peace Region. The purpose is twofold: to entertain, educate, and engage audiences; and to grow the film-making community in the Peace Region by inspiring, developing, and showcasing its filmmakers. Thousands of submissions are received annually from which 80-105 short films are selected. It is a qualifying festival for the Canadian Screen Awards.

== History ==
Terry Scerbak founded the festival as a production of the nonprofit Grande Prairie Live Theatre in 2007. In 2016, she was one of the founding members of the Reel Shorts Film Society which took over the production of the festival in 2017 with the full support and cooperation of the GPLT Board of Directors.

The festival's program has grown from 3 days screening 38 films in 2007 to 6–8 days screening 80-105 films since 2014. The 14th edition of the festival, originally scheduled for May 4–11, 2020 but postponed due to the COVID-19 pandemic, takes place April 26 to May 3, 2021.

== Awards ==
Since 2010, audiences have determined the winner(s) of the Audience Choice Awards. Since 2014, the directors of Audience Choice Awards and Jury Awards have received an award designed by Grande Prairie sculptor Grant Berg.

=== Audience Choice Awards ===
Year	Audience Choice Short	Youth Audience Choice Short
2019	The Blue Door (dir. Paul Taylor, UK)	All in Good Time (dir. Bonnie Dempsey, Ireland)
2018	The Ambassador (dir. Shane Atkinson, France)	Rag Dolls (dir. Justin and Kristin Schaack, USA)
2017	The Babysitter Murders (dir. Ryan Spindell, USA)	Get Up Kinshasa! (dir. Sébastien Maitre, France)
2016	Discipline (dir. Christophe M. Saber, Switzerland)	Dji. Death Sails (dir. Dmitri Voloshin, Moldova)
2015	The Gunfighter (dir. Eric Kissack, USA)	Foster Dog (dir. Lisa Alonso Vear, USA)
2014	Fool's Day (dir. Cody Blue Snider, USA)	
2013	A Senior Moment (dir. Michelle Davidson, USA)	
2012	Sugar (Suiker) (dir. Jeroen Annokkée, Netherlands)	
2011	The Legend of Beaver Dam (dir. Jerome Sable, Canada)	
2010	Multiple Choice (dir. Michael Goode, Australia)	

In 2014, the festival became competitive and presented the following awards.

=== Jury Awards ===
Year	Best Live Action Short Under 15 Minutes	Best Live Action Short 15+ Minutes	Best Animated Short	Best Documentary Short
2019	The Blue Door (dir. Paul Taylor, UK)	Suck It Up (Avaler des couleuvres) (dir. Jan Sitta, France)	The Driver is Red (dir. Randall Christopher, USA)	The Day Don Died (dir. Steve J. Adams and Sean Horlor, Canada)
2018	About the Birds and the Bees (dir. J.J. (Janne) Vanhanen, Finland)	The Winkles (Les Bigorneaux) (dir. Alice Vial, France)	Two Trams (dir. Svetlana Andrianova, Russian Federation)	Fixed! (dir. Cat Mills, Canada)
2017	Camping with Ada (Campingliv) (dir. Ina Lerner Grevstad, Norway)	La femme et le TGV (dir. Timo von Gunten, Switzerland)	Borrowed Time (dir. Lou Hamou-Lhadj and Andrew Coats, USA)	12 Days in Idomeni (dir. Javier Sobremazas, Germany)

Year	Best Live Action Short Under 13 Minutes	Best Live Action Short 13+ Minutes	Best Animated Short	Best Documentary Short
2016	The Jacket (Die Jacke) (dir. Patrick Vollrath, Austria)	Wolf Head (Gueule de loup) (dir. Alice Vial, France)	The OceanMaker (dir. Lucas Martell, Belize/USA)	The House is Innocent (dir. Nicholas Coles, USA)

Year	Best Live Action Short	Best Animated Short	Best Documentary Short
2015	The Way of Tea (Les frémissements du thé) (dir. Marc Fouchard, France)	Strings (Cuerdas) (dir. Pedro Solis Garcia, Spain)	The Tsunami and the Cherry Blossom (dir. Lucy Walker, Japan/USA)
2014	Dotty (dir. Mick Andrews and Brett O'Gorman, New Zealand)	Oh Sheep! (dir. Gottfried Mentor, Germany)	Grandpa and Me and a Helicopter to Heaven (Morfar och Jag och Helikoptern till Himlen) (Åsa Blanck and Johan Palmgren, Sweden)

== Film Productions ==
In the summer of 2012, the festival produced a short film as part of Shoot for Reel, a two-week internship training program for 12 interns which was a collaboration between the festival, Grande Prairie Regional College, and Ricebrain Media, a Vancouver film company whose president (Scott Belyea) grew up in Grande Prairie. The Horizon Project, the short film that Belyea directed during the 11 days of Shoot for Reel, premiered at the 7th Reel Shorts Film Festival in 2013.

The school program of screenings, training, and filmmaker class visits is a big component of the film festival. In 2013, the festival produced HB, an 8-minute film directed by Nathan Fast, as part of the Youth Film Mentorship Project. On Sep 29, 2013, it won the Best Overall Youth Short Film Award at the Calgary International Film Festival and a month later won the Young Filmmakers Program Competition Grand Prize at the 2013 Austin Film Festival.

In the summer of 2018, the festival helped fund the production of the short film Aeternitas as part of the 2018 Shoot for Reel, a five-day internship training program for 12 interns led by Writer/Director Gordie Haakstad and Cinematographer Chris Beauchamp, owners of The Distillery Film Company and producers of the film. Aeternitas was nominated for six Rosie Awards in 2019 for Drama Under 30 Minutes and won two of them: Gordie Haakstad for Best Director and Chris Beauchamp for Best Cinematographer.

== See also ==
- List of festivals in Alberta
- List of short film festivals
- List of film festivals in North and Central America
- List of film festivals
