= Unfriended =

2014 film by Levan Gabriadze

- Theatrical release poster
- Directed by: Leo Gabriadze
- Written by: Nelson Greaves
- Produced by: Timur Bekmambetov; Jason Blum; Nelson Greaves
- Starring: Shelley Hennig; Moses Storm; Renee Olstead; Will Peltz; Jacob Wysocki; Courtney Halverson; Heather Sossaman
- Cinematography: Adam Sidman
- Edited by: Parker Laramie; Andrew Wesman
- Production companies: Bazelevs Company; Blumhouse Productions
- Distributed by: Universal Pictures
- Release dates: July 20, 2014 (Fantasia); April 17, 2015 (United States)
- Running time: 83 minutes
- Country: United States
- Language: English
- Budget: $1 million
- Box office: $64.4 million

Unfriended (originally titled Cybernatural) is a 2014 American screenlife supernatural horror film directed by Levan Gabriadze and produced by Timur Bekmambetov. Set on a computer screen, the film stars Shelley Hennig, Moses Storm, Renee Olstead, Will Peltz, Jacob Wysocki, and Courtney Halverson as six high school students in a Skype conversation which is haunted by a student, played by Heather Sossaman, who was bullied by them and killed herself. The film is told almost entirely through a screencast of a MacBook.

The film premiered at the Fantasia International Film Festival on July 20, 2014, and was theatrically released by Universal Pictures in the United States on April 17, 2015. The film received mixed reviews from critics but was a box-office success, grossing $64.4 million against a $1 million budget. A standalone sequel, Unfriended: Dark Web, was released in 2018.

== Plot ==
In Fresno, California in 2013, high school student Laura Barns dies by suicide via gunshot after an anonymous user uploads a video of her passing out and defecating at an unsupervised party, making it go viral. One year later, her former childhood best friend, Blaire Lily, is chatting with her boyfriend, Mitch Roussel, on Skype, during which they agree to lose their virginities to each other on prom night. Soon after, they are joined by their friends and classmates Jess Felton, Ken Smith, and Adam Sewell. However, an unknown user named "billie227" intrudes.

The group tries various ways to get rid of the intruder, but they are unsuccessful each time. Blaire looks up the account and realizes that it belonged to Laura, though the others are incredulous about the possibility of Laura contacting them from the grave. The group suspects that a classmate, Val Rommel, is pranking them. After they invite Val to their chat, Jess' Facebook page is updated with embarrassing photos of Val at a party. Jess denies uploading the photos and deletes them from her account, but the pictures instantly reappear on Adam's account. Val receives a message of a picture not visible to the others, which she considers a threat. Angry, she calls 911 to report that she is being harassed and abruptly leaves the chat.

The group receives a photo of Val and Laura's Facebook messages from before Laura's death, with Val telling Laura to kill herself. Val reappears in the chat, sitting motionless and silent next to a bottle of bleach before collapsing. Police officers arrive shortly after; the friends eavesdrop and learn that Val died from a presumed suicide. Just then, "billie227" sends each of the friends a personalized message proving intimate knowledge of their secrets; in Blaire's case, this turns out to be several pictures revealing that she had cheated on Mitch with Adam. Ken distributes a program to remove "billie227" from the chat, and Adam attempts to call the police. However, the 911 operator turns out to be the intruder again and re-enters the chat, revealing a camera view from the other side of Ken's room. He approaches the camera source, but then, his video feed is briefly cut, before it shows him killing himself with a blender.

Afterward, "billie227" forces the remaining four friends to play a game of Never have I ever, stating that the loser will die. During the course of the game, it is revealed that Jess started a rumor that Blaire had an eating disorder; Blaire stole and crashed Jess' mother's car; Mitch made out with Laura and also reported Adam to the police for dealing cannabis; Jess stole $800 from Adam; and Adam offered to trade Jess' life for the others in the group. Tensions flare, and a drunken Adam finally loses his temper and uses the game to force Blaire to reveal that she is no longer a virgin, having slept with him at least twice behind Mitch's back. Mitch is distraught and retaliates by forcing Adam to admit that he roofied a classmate, raped her while she was unconscious, and forced her to abort the pregnancy.

Blaire and Adam then receive messages sent remotely to their printers, which they refuse to show to Mitch and Jess. Mitch threatens to leave if Blaire does not show the note, and "billie227" warns that Mitch will die if he signs off. In a moment of panic, Blaire shows her note, which states: "If you reveal this note, Adam will die". Adam, having pulled out a gun, shoots himself, knocking his camera and revealing a similar note directed to Blaire that would have killed her instead. After this, "billie227" continues the game, asking Jess if she defaced her grave. As Blaire convinces Jess not to continue playing, the lights are cut in Jess' house and her video feed is disconnected. Blaire looks for help on Chatroulette and gets a stranger in Nevada to send police to Jess' house. Soon after, Jess' video feed reconnects, showing her with an activated curling iron in her mouth, killing her; the intruder even creates a crude meme with a picture of Jess' demise.

The lights in Blaire and Mitch's houses are cut, and "billie227" — now revealed to be Laura herself — presses them to confess who uploaded the video. Blaire tells her that Mitch was the one who posted it; Mitch then stabs himself in the eye with a hunting knife. Laura begins a countdown and Blaire brings up photos of their time as friends, apologizing about how they drifted apart. Laura asks if that was how she truly remembered things, before her countdown hits zero. Laura then uploads an extended version of the party video to Blaire's Facebook page, which reveals Blaire operating the camera for the original video. The new video quickly gains attention, with multiple people sending scathing comments towards Blaire for her actions that led to Laura's suicide. Laura says that she wishes she could forgive Blaire before leaving the chat. As Blaire hears her bedroom door creak, her laptop is slammed shut and Laura's spirit attacks her.

== Cast ==
- Shelley Hennig as Blaire Lily
- Moses Storm as Mitch Roussel
- Renee Olstead as Jess Felton
- Will Peltz as Adam Sewell
- Jacob Wysocki as Ken Smith
- Courtney Halverson as Val Rommel
- Heather Sossaman as Laura Barns / "billie227"
- Mickey River as Dank Jimmy
- Cal Barnes as Rando Pauls
- Matthew Bohrer as Matt
- Christa Hartsock as Chatroulette Girl
- Greg Cipes as Brucer the dog (Uncredited)
Also uncredited are Konstantin Khabensky and Michael Herbig as Police officers and Tony Hernandez, Anthony Eftimeo and Denis Lyons as unnamed students.

== Production ==
Gabriadze was attracted to the project (then titled Offline) as it focused on the theme of bullying. He noted that the nature of bullying had changed since he was in school, as the Internet allowed for bullies to continue their actions even after school hours.

Production was 16 days total, including six 12-hour days of principal photography, three days of pick-ups and then a few more reshoots. When filming began, it mostly consisted of long takes around ten minutes in length. Shelley Hennig, who portrayed Blaire, found that this proved difficult for the energy and motivation needed from her and the other actors. At her request, at least one full, 80-minute-long take was filmed, with each actor in separate rooms with separate computers. The film's ending was captured during one of these feature-length takes.

The film's title changed during shooting (and would also change prior to its theatrical release), as the film's crew felt that the title of Offline was "too general and not obvious" and that the then title of Cybernatural was "more to the point of what it is". For wide release, the film was re-titled Unfriended.

== Release ==
Unfriended initially had its world premiere on July 20, 2014, at the Fantasia International Film Festival and screened on the film festival circuit under the title of Cybernatural. A generally positive film festival reception and test screenings for the film prompted Universal Pictures to pick up the film rights with the intent to give it a wide theatrical release the following year. The film's title was changed from Cybernatural to Unfriended and the film was theatrically released on April 17, 2015. The film was screened at Playlist Live on February 6, 2015, and premiered at SXSW on March 13, 2015.

=== Marketing ===
Unfriended was heavily marketed online, with 60% of the marketing budget being spent on digital platforms. January 12, 2015, the film's first official trailer with the title Unfriended was released. Shortly after, on February 6, 2015, the film was screened at Playlist Live, a popular convention for internet celebrities from Vine and YouTube. Images were also released.

On February 13, 2015, a campaign was launched with Kik Messenger, in which Kik users could have a chat conversation with Laura. This made use of automated responses and pre-scripted responses, while also driving users to a dedicated microsite.

On March 13, 2015, after the film's premiere at SXSW, an after-party was hosted by Blumhouse. Exclusive Never Have I Ever cards were released at SXSW later, and a "NEVER HAVE I EVER" section was set up on the film's official website. Unfriended-themed photo booths were set up as well. During production, official Facebook and Skype accounts were set up for the characters in the film, and, after the premiere at SXSW, people who attended were "friended" by the official Laura Barns Facebook account. There was also a Twitter account, which tweeted attendees of the after-party.

=== Home media ===
Unfriended was released on DVD and Blu-ray on August 11, 2015. It received a Netflix release in May 2017. The Criterion Collection also added the film to their streaming service in October 2023.

== Reception ==
=== Box office ===
Unfriended grossed $32.8 million in North America and $31.6 million in other territories, for a worldwide gross of $64.4 million against a budget of $1 million. Deadline Hollywood calculated the net profit of the film to be $17.1 million, when factoring together all expenses and revenues.

In North America, the film opened against Child 44, Paul Blart: Mall Cop 2 and Monkey Kingdom on April 17, 2015, across 2,739 theaters, earning $6.8 million on its opening day. In its opening weekend, Unfriended earned $15.8 million, which was higher than its $12 million range projection, and finished in third place at the box office behind Furious 7 ($29.2 million) and fellow newcomer Paul Blart: Mall Cop 2 ($23.8 million). Its opening weekend is the biggest debut for an original horror movie since The Conjuring, which opened with $41.9 million in July 2013.

=== Critical reception ===
Review aggregator Rotten Tomatoes gives the film an approval rating of 62% based on 183 reviews, with an average rating of 5.8/10. The site's critical consensus reads, "Unfriended subverts found-footage horror clichés to deliver a surprisingly scary entry in the teen slasher genre with a technological twist." On Metacritic, the film has a weighted average score of 59 out of 100 based on 30 critics, indicating "mixed or average reviews".

Reception at the Fantasia Film Festival was mostly positive. Common praise for the film centered upon its acting and visuals, and Twitch Film commented that the film was an "interesting look at modern methods of communication and the ramifications of the new normal of always-on social interaction." Variety commented that while the film was "exasperating" at points, they also felt that it was clever and innovative.

Dread Central also praised the film overall, but stated that they felt that the movie's one major flaw was "the fashion in which we are trafficked to each scare through multi-screen clicking, copying, pasting and re-sizing, basically all-around multi-tasking. It can be trying to sit through and I liken it to sitting over someone's shoulder watching them web-surf... endlessly." It was named Most Innovative Film at the Fantasia Film Festival and received a Special Mention for Feature Film.

British film critic Mark Kermode gave the film a positive review, calling it a film which understands Skyping culture and cyber-bullying. He said, "Many people who've seen the trailer say, 'You're being stalked through the internet. Just log off.' The point is they can't because they're addicted." While on one hand admitting it was a "shrieky, teen-terrorized, slasher movie," on the other hand he said it was a film about how cyber-bullying only works if you cooperate with it.

Irish film critic Donald Clarke, writing for The Irish Times, gave the film a very positive review, describing it as "genuinely unsettling" and praising the filmmakers' "uncanny grasp of the complicated dynamics of contemporary interaction" and how they succeeded in retaining "a position on the moral high ground while bloody mayhem rages around their feet".

Some critics found the film to contain unintentionally humorous moments that detracted from the experience. Lauren Chval of RedEye found the scenes involving Blaire's pleas for help on Chatroulette, as well as some of the phrases typed by Laura's ghost (including "but in this version [of a drinking game], the loser doesn’t drink. The loser dies."), to be more humorous than frightening.

In CinemaScore polls conducted during the opening weekend, cinema audiences gave Unfriended an average grade of "C", on an A+ to F scale.

== Sequel ==
In April 2015, it was announced that Universal Pictures had greenlit a sequel, tentatively titled Unfriended 2. In October 2017, it was announced that the film was shot secretly and the film's working title would be Unfriended: Game Night. On March 9, 2018, the film's official title was revealed to be Unfriended: Dark Web. The film was released on July 20, 2018.

== See also ==
- Bullying and suicide
- Cyberbullying
- Chatroom
- The Den
- Friend Request
- Host
- List of ghost films
- Take This Lollipop
