= Mark Baechle =

Swiss composer (born 1977)

- Born: June 25, 1977 (age 49); Basel, Switzerland
- Other name: Mark Bächle

Mark Baechle (alternately spelled Mark Bächle, born June 25, 1977) is a Swiss composer based in New York City.

== Early life and education ==
Baechle was born in Basel, Switzerland. He studied film scoring at Berklee College of Music in Boston.

== Career ==
After college, Baechle moved to New York. At the outset of his career, he assisted Academy Award-winning composer Elliot Goldenthal in New York and started to work as an orchestrator for a number of well-known score composers. He subsequently established his own career as a composer for film and television, writing scores for documentaries, short films, and series.

In 2024, Baechle composed the score for the short film Edge of Space, which was shortlisted for the 97th Academy Awards in the Live Action Short Film category.

Also in 2024, Baechle co-composed (with Marcus Bagalà) the score for the feature-length documentary Clemente, which premiered at SXSW.

Baechle's score for the Swiss period drama Frieda's Case (Friedas Fall), directed by Maria Brendle, was also released in 2024. The film centers on a historical court case from 1904 and premiered at the 20th Zurich Film Festival to critical acclaim.

== Awards ==
Baechle received the 2021 Los Angeles Area Emmy Award for Outstanding Music Composition for his work on the KCET documentary series Tending Nature: Preserving the Desert with the Native American Land Conservancy.

== Select credits ==
- Edge of Space (short film, 2024) – composer
- Clemente (feature documentary, 2024) – co-composer (with Marcus Bagalà)
- Frieda's Case (*Friedas Fall*) (feature film, 2024) – composer
- Max Dagan (feature film, 2024) - composer
- Vow of Silence: The Assassination of Annie Mae (series, 2024) - co-composer (with Robert Mirabal)
