= Timo von Gunten =

Swiss director, writer and producer (born 1989)

Timo von Gunten (born 15 December 1989) is a Swiss film director, screenwriter and producer. He is best known for writing and directing the short film La femme et le TGV (2016), starring Jane Birkin, which was nominated for the Academy Award for Best Live Action Short Film at the 89th Academy Awards in 2017. The film also won the Swiss Film Award for Best Short Film and the Audience Award at the Max Ophüls Prize.

His work includes short films, feature films, television series and animation. He co-directed the second season of the Swiss television series Die Beschatter (Quasi Detectives) and was a writer and producer on the 2026 animated short film Pigeons, narrated by Andy Serkis.

Since 2018, von Gunten has been a member of the Academy of Motion Picture Arts and Sciences.

== Early life and education ==
Timo von Gunten was born on 15 December 1989 in Zürich, Switzerland. He began making films at a young age, producing numerous short films before establishing himself professionally as a filmmaker.

He studied screenwriting at the Zurich University of the Arts (ZHdK), graduating with a Master of Arts in 2020. Alongside his filmmaking career, he plays the cello in the film music symphonic orchestra Tifico.

== Career ==
=== Early work and international recognition (2011–2017) ===
Von Gunten began his professional filmmaking career writing and directing short films, including Acht Blumen (2011), Monsieur du Lit (2012), Poupée (2013) and Mosquito (2014). His early films received recognition at international film festivals.

In 2016 von Gunten co-wrote and directed the experimental impro film Le Voyageur (The Voyager, 2016) having its world premiere at the Zurich Film Festival and screening in competition at the Sophia Int. Film Festival as well as the Max Ophüls Preis in Saarbrücken.

Von Gunten gained international recognition with La femme et le TGV (2016), a short film starring British-French actress and icon Jane Birkin. Producers on this film were Giacun Caduff, Jean de Meuron, Bela Böke and Giles Foreman. The film is about a lonely widow who develops an unlikely correspondence with a high-speed train driver after waving to his passing train every day. When their connection is unexpectedly interrupted, she embarks on a journey of self-discovery.

In 2017, La femme et le TGV won the Swiss Film Award for Best Short Film and was nominated for the Academy Award for Best Live Action Short Film at the 89th Academy Awards. It won the Swiss Film Award for best short film of the year and was also included in the Césars's Nuits en Or programme. The film received numerous international awards, including audience awards at the Heartland Film Festival, the Shnit International Shortfilmfestival, the Boulder International Film Festival and the Max Ophüls Prize.

=== Television and further work (2018–2026) ===
His subsequent projects included the short films The Impatient Patient (2019), Sonnenwende (2020), as well as the commercial Dreamcolor (2020) for HP, which received an Bronze EDI Award for best commercial spot in Switzerland.

Von Gunten continued working in development of several feature scripts and began working in television. He worked as a second-unit director on the first season of the Swiss crime-comedy television series Die Beschatter (Quasi Detectives), produced by Turnus Film for Swiss Radio and Television (SRF). He subsequently returned as a co-director with Michael Steiner for the second season.

In 2024, von Gunten was selected for Netflix's Grow Creative director development programme. In 2025, he participated in a Netflix workshop on directing actors led by filmmaker Michael Lehmann.

In 2026, von Gunten co-wrote and produced the Swiss-American animated short film Pigeons, directed by Amos Sussigan and narrated by British actor Andy Serkis.

Von Gunten originated the initial concept and idea for the film, which developed into a screenplay co-written with Julien M. Wagner and Sussigan.

The film follows a carrier pigeon whose role becomes obsolete following the introduction of the telephone. Searching for food, shelter and a new purpose, the story explores technological progress, freedom and the experience of being left behind.

The production was a collaboration between The Hub Media and BMC Films, with producers including Amos Sussigan, Timo von Gunten, Samira Sahli, Dan Lund, with Jean de Meuron and Andy Serkis as executive producers.

Pigeons premiered at the Animayo International Film Festival of Animation in May 2026, where it won Best Production Design. It won best animation film at the New York Shorts International Film Festival. It subsequently screened at international festivals including Indy Shorts, HollyShorts, the Rhode Island International Film Festival and Fantoche, the International Animation Film Festival in Baden, Switzerland.

== Filmography ==
- 2026 – Pigeons – original idea, writer, co-producer (animated short film)
- 2025 – Finally Finn (feature, screenwriter)
- 2024–2025 – Die Beschatter, season 2 – Co-director (television series)
- 2022 – Die Beschatter, season 1 – second-unit director (television series)
- 2020 – Dreamcolor – director (commercial)
- 2020 – Sonnenwende – director (short)
- 2018 – The Man who sold the Eiffel Tower (feature, screenwriter)
- 2019 – The Impatient Patient – writer / director (short)
- 2016 – La femme et le TGV – writer / director (short)
- 2016 – Le voyageur – writer / director (experimental)
- 2014 – Mosquito – writer / director (short)
- 2013 – Poupée – writer / director (short)
- 2013 – Eastern Winds – writer / director (short)
- 2011 – Acht Blumen – writer / director (short)
- 2011 – Monsieur Du Lit – writer / director (short)

== Awards ==
- 2026 – New York Shorts International Film Festival – Best Animation (Pigeons)
- 2026 – Animayo International Film Festival – Best Production Design (Pigeons)
- 2020 – EDI Awards – Corporate Communication / Marketing Film (Dreamcolor)
- 2017 – Academy Awards (Oscars) – Nomination for Best Live Action Short Film (La femme et le TGV)
- 2017 – Swiss Film Awards – Best Short Film (La femme et le TGV)
- 2017 – Max Ophüls Prize – Audience Award (La femme et le TGV)
- 2017 – Boulder International Film Festival – Audience Award (La femme et le TGV)
- 2017 – Underexposed Film Festival – Grand Jury Award (La femme et le TGV)
- 2016 – Heartland Film Festival – Audience Award (La femme et le TGV)
- 2016 – Sitges Film Festival, Noves Visions – Jury Award (La femme et le TGV)
- 2016 – Shnit International Shortfilmfestival – Audience Award (La femme et le TGV)
- 2015 Winner, Best Screenplay: CWA Competition LA for La femme et le TGV
- 2015 Grand Jury Prize, Best Screenplay: trms Award for La femme et le TGV
- 2015 Winner: Int. Jaipur Film Festival, India, Best Picture Mosquito
- 2014 Winner: NYC Picture Start Film Festival, Best Cinematography Mosquito
- 2014 Closing Ceremony Film, BBC Film Festival Aan Korb, London Eastern Winds
- 2013 Winner: Swiss Short Film Festival, Los Angeles Poupée
- 2013 Director's Choice Award, Lucerne Dance Film Festival Eastern Winds
- 2012 Winner: Unica Award Swiss Youth Film Festival Monsieur du Lit
- 2012 Winner: Swiss Hotel Film Award Monsieur du Lit
- 2012 Winner: Film Festival Schaffhausen Monsieur du Lit
- 2012 Winner: Short Short Film Festival, Rhode Island, USA Monsieur du Lit
- 2011 Winner: Haba Youth Prize, Uster Acht Blumen
- 2011 Winner: Int. Social Media Film Festival, Las Vegas Acht Blumen
- 2011 Winner: Int. Filmfestival Luzern, Best Picture Acht Blumen
