= Etienne! =

2009 film by Jeff Mizushima

- Directed by: Jeff Mizushima
- Written by: Jeff Mizushima
- Produced by: Jeremy Boreing; Giacun Caduff; Joel Moore
- Starring: Richard Vallejos; Megan Taylor Harvey; Sophia Myles; Courtney Halverson
- Cinematography: Tim van der Linden
- Production company: Category One Entertainment
- Release date: June 12, 2009
- Running time: 88 minutes
- Country: United States
- Language: English

Etienne! is a 2009 American comedy film written and directed by Jeff Mizushima. It stars Richard Vallejos, Sophia Myles and Courtney Halverson. It was released on June 12, 2009 at the CineVegas International Film Festival and received positive reviews from critics.

== Cast ==
- Richard Vallejos as Richard
- Megan Taylor Harvey as Elodie
- Sophia Myles as Sophia
- Courtney Halverson as Tara
- David Fine as Kenly
- Caveh Zahedi as Man in coat
- Jeremiah Turner as Doug
- Matt Garron as Matt
- Rachel Stolte as Rachel
- Solon Bixler as Solon
- Anthony Kuan as Anthony
- Molly Livingston as Molly
- Jerry Mosher as Dr. Mosher
- Marisa Pedroso as Marion
- Claudia Pedroso as Marion's Mother
- Vito Razi as Vito
- Lisa Strauss as Shannon
- Debaveye Thibault as Backpacker
- Sarah Virden as Sarah

== Reception ==
The film was a critical success. The Hollywood Reporter named it an "oddball charmer" of a film and 'the unofficial feel-good film of the fest'. Others liked the 'feel-good' atmosphere of the film and the cheerful 1960s setting along with its celebrity cameo appearances. The film has a rating of 88% on Rotten Tomatoes. The New York Times labelled the film as "enormously likable".
