= UCLA Extension =

Public continuing education institution

- Type: Public continuing education institution
- Established: 1917
- Parent institution: University of California, Los Angeles
- Dean: Eric A. Bullard, Ph.D.
- Location: Los Angeles, California, United States
- Campus: Urban
- Website: uclaextension.edu

UCLA Extension is a public continuing education institution headquartered in Westwood, Los Angeles, on the campus of the University of California, Los Angeles. Classes are held at UCLA, in Downtown Los Angeles, and other locations throughout Los Angeles County.

Founded in 1917, it is part of the University of California system, and all courses are approved by the University of California, Los Angeles, although it is financially self-supporting.

UCLA Extension is accredited, through UCLA, by the Western Association of Schools and Colleges.

== History ==
On February 14, 1893, the Regents of the University of California adopted the extramural instruction plan, which officially founded University Extension.

In 1902, University Extension was reorganized as a self-governing body within the university. The doors of UC Extension in Los Angeles (officially "University of California Extension Division, Southern District") were opened in September 1917.

Extension's original location was in downtown Los Angeles. For the growing film industry, one early course was "Motion Pictures: The Film as a Factor in Molding Tomorrow's Citizenry." By 1919, more than 1,600 students attended almost 100 classes.

Beginning in 1942, Dean Baldwin Woods guided University Extension through the revisionist era of World War II and the postwar years. "Long before many leaders in the community realized that the knowledge explosion had shattered the myth of ever 'finishing' one's education, he perceived the huge and unending task of continuing education."

== Academics ==
UCLA Extension offers more than 5,000 courses and more than 100 certificate programs.

== Entertainment Studies ==
UCLA's Entertainment Studies program has graduated Emmy-, Grammy- and Oscar-nominated and winning alumni, more recently including: Gavin Hood (Ender’s Game, Tsotsi, Rendition, X-Men Origins: Wolverine) and Darryl Swann (Macy Gray, Black Eyed Peas, Mos Def). Award-winning instructors include Kirk Saduski (John Adams, The Pacific, Game Change, The Seventies), among others.

== Writers' Program ==
The UCLA Extension Writers' Program is the largest open-enrollment writing and screenwriting program in the world.

Notable alumni include: Bryan Cogman, Game of Thrones; Stuart Beattie, G.I. Joe: The Rise of Cobra; Australia; Pirates of the Caribbean: The Curse of the Black Pearl; 30 Days of Night; Collateral; Zoanne Clack, Grey’s Anatomy; Tucker Cawley, Parks and Recreation, Everybody Loves Raymond; Eric Jerome Dickey, Resurrecting Midnight; Doug Ellin, Entourage; Janet Fitch, White Oleander (Oprah Pick); Alice Greenway, White Ghost Girls (winner of the Los Angeles Times Book Prize for First Fiction); Gavin Hood, Tsotsi (Academy Award winner, Best Foreign Film); Randi Mayem Singer, Mrs. Doubtfire; Melissa Rosenberg, adaptation of Twilight; Dexter; Earl W. Wallace, Witness (Academy Award winner for Best Original Screenplay); Joseph Wambaugh, The Onion Field; Kevin Williamson, Scream, Dawson’s Creek; Iris Yamashita, Letters from Iwo Jima (Academy Award nominee for Best Original Screenplay).

== Notable instructors and lecturers ==
Notable instructors and lecturers at UCLA Extension have included the Pablo Casals, Walter Cronkite, Steve Allen, Aldous Huxley, Henry Kissinger, Jascha Heifetz, and Peter Drucker, Giammario Villa, among others.

== Notable alumni ==
People who have taken classes or graduated from UCLA Extension include:

- Troy Aikman, NFL Hall of Fame quarterback, earned his B.A. from UCLA by taking his last two courses online through UCLA Extension.
- James Franco attended UCLA Extension, taking courses in literature and creative writing.
- Jean de Meuron attended UCLA Extension, earning the Business & Management of Entertainment certificate with distinction.
- Frederico Lapenda graduated in the Film & Television Program in 1994. He is a movie producer, MMA promoter, Allies of the Amazon co-creator with Stan Lee, Beverly Hills Film Festival President, and Brazilian Tourism Ambassador.
- Marilyn Monroe attended UCLA Extension in April 1951, taking "Backgrounds of Literature" with teacher Claire Soule.
- Univision news anchor Jorge Ramos received a journalism certificate from UCLA Extension.
- Arnold Schwarzenegger enrolled in Extension classes during the 1970s as a young actor and bodybuilder, and helped celebrate Extension's 90th anniversary.
- Benson Taylor attended UCLA Extension, taking courses in game music production.
- Ava DuVernay took filmmaking courses from UCLA Extension as part of her transition from a career in public relations to film.
