= Last Appeal =

2024 American film

- Official poster
- Directed by: Terre Weisman
- Written by: Terre Weisman
- Produced by: Rafi Jacobs; Barry Katz; Stephen Mastrocola; Liana Montemayor; Terre Weisman
- Starring: Rob Morrow; Zachary Gordon; Jay Mohr; Jeff Ross; Michael Madsen
- Cinematography: Tim Banks
- Edited by: Luka Stojcic
- Music by: Mark Baechle
- Production companies: Creative Balance Films; Static Films; Barry Katz Entertainment
- Release date: June 30, 2024 (DWF)
- Running time: 92 minutes
- Country: United States
- Language: English

Last Appeal (originally titled Max Dagan) is a 2024 American drama film written and directed by Terre Weisman and starring Rob Morrow, Zachary Gordon, Jay Mohr, Jeff Ross, and Michael Madsen (in his final film role, released during his lifetime). Produced by Weisman and Barry Katz, the film follows guitarist Max Dagan (Gordon), who attempts to secure the release of his imprisoned, dying father Albert (Morrow). Lindsey Dresbach and Rob Brownstein appear in supporting roles.

Last Appeal had its world premiere at the Dances with Films film festival on June 30, 2024. Dresbach won the Best Supporting Actress award at the Boston Film Festival for her role in the film.

== Premise ==
Trying to get his dying father released from prison, rock band guitarist Max Dagan enlists the help of the daughter of the man his father killed.

== Cast ==
- Zachary Gordon as Max Dagan
  - Harry Holden White as Young Max Dagan
- Rob Morrow as Albert Dagan
- Michael Madsen as Dan Clancy
- Lindsey Dresbach as Alaina Brennan
  - Mara Swanson as Young Alaina Brennan
- Rob Brownstein as Bob Dagan
- Lisa Roumain as Ilene Brennan
- Richard Neil as John Brennan
- Jay Mohr as Dr. Gene Connors
- Jeff Ross as Oscar Lubin
- Kirk Fox as Sergeant Clark
- Jacob Wysocki as Steve "The Bartender"
- Eugenia Kuzmina as Lisa Tyler
- Justice Gamble as Eddie Brock

== Production ==
Weisman self-financed Last Appeal and started writing the film in 2020, although production was stalled due to the COVID-19 pandemic. In September 2022, Michael Madsen, Rob Morrow, and Jay Mohr were cast in the film. Filming started the same month.

Originally titled Max Dagan, the film's title was changed to Last Appeal in 2025.

== Release ==
Last Appeal premiered at the Dances with Films film festival on June 30, 2024, at the TCL Chinese Theatre.

== Accolades ==
Year	Award	Category	Nominated work	Result
2024	Boston Film Festival	Best Supporting Actress	Lindsey Dresbach	Won
2024	SoHo International Film Festival	Best Film	Terre Weisman	Won
