= The Test (talk show) =

American talk show (2013–2014)

- Genre: Talk show
- Presented by: Kirk Fox
- Country of origin: United States
- Original language: English
- No. of seasons: 1
- No. of episodes: 118

Production
- Executive producers: Carla Pennington; Jay McGraw; Patricia Ciano
- Running time: 42 minutes
- Production companies: Stage 29 Productions; CBS Television Distribution

Original release
- Network: Syndication
- Release: September 9, 2013 – May 2014

The Test is an American conflict resolution talk show that premiered on September 9, 2013, and aired on syndication. Hosted by Kirk Fox, The Test handles a variety of tests such as polygraph, DNA, and pregnancy. It resolves conflicts that are present between families, friends or various people.

== Production ==
The series was revealed on January 9, 2013, when it was sold into 56% of the country. By April 2013, The Test was sold in over 90% of the country with Tribune Broadcasting's 17 owned stations serving as the series' anchor group in major markets.

On April 1, 2014, it was announced that The Test had been canceled.
