= Check This Kid Out =

American television series

Check This Kid Out is a Disney Channel short series which premiered in June 2005, during Disney Channel's So Hot Summer! promotion. Narrated by Courtney Halverson and Carr Thompson, the show features short segments of teenagers, from across the country, who spotlight the jobs that they do. Toon Disney stopped airing the short series on February 12, 2009. The series was left on the air until December 2009, but it returned on March 26, 2012.

== The kids ==
This season featured a combination slideshow / video format, featuring ideas of possible professions. This season featured these kids and their jobs:

Kid	Job
Adam Ho	Guitarist
Arabella Uhry	Medical Expert
Jessica Long	Swimmer
Brittany Colon	Sport Buddy
Cameron DiSarcina	Shrooms Enthusiast
Francisco Fernandez	Anime Expert
Daniel Brim	Inventor
Danielle Grega	Poetry Writer
DJ Sconyers	Translator
Chance Ruder	Animal Ambassador
John-Henry Lambin	Kids Extreme Founder
Lyndsey Adkins	Artist
Kaylie Richards	Basketball Expert
Farrah Vincent	Yo-Yo Player
Hayley Perkins	Horse Coach
Omar Wiseman	Chess Champion
Kali Gluckman	Photographer
Emily Cutler	Strings
Michael Rand	Pilot
Rika Tachikawa	J-Pop Idol

The Check This Kid Out interstitials were originally cast with the help of Alyse Rome, founder and president of Amazing Kids! (www.amazing-kids.org), a children's educational non-profit organization and the number one online resource for stories about real-life amazing kids. Alyse was hired as a consultant to help with the initial casting.
