= La femme et le TGV =

- Film poster
- Directed by: Timo von Gunten
- Written by: Timo von Gunten
- Produced by: Giacun Caduff, Jean de Meuron, Bela Böke, Giles Foreman
- Starring: Jane Birkin
- Music by: Diego Baldenweg with Nora Baldenweg and Lionel Baldenweg
- Release date: 5 August 2016
- Running time: 30 minutes
- Country: Switzerland
- Language: French

La femme et le TGV (English: The Railroad Lady) is a 2016 Swiss French-language short film directed by Timo von Gunten. It received critical acclaim and was nominated for many industry awards including the Academy Award for Best Live Action Short Film at the 89th Academy Awards in 2017 with producer Giacun Caduff.

== Synopsis ==
A lonely widow, Elise, lives next to a TGV railroad line in Switzerland and makes a point to wave a Swiss flag at the train during its twice daily passing. By day she runs a bakery in town which has few customers. Across the street from her bakery is a dance studio which is visited by a young man, Jacques, who drives recklessly into town and parks illegally in front of the bakery to visit his girlfriend, much to Elise's dismay.

Meanwhile, Elise gets a letter, thrown out the window of a passing train, from Bruno, a TGV train driver, thanking her for her flag waving. Moved, she manages to establish contact with Bruno and the two develop a relationship, with him dropping letters and packages to her regularly. Through her letters and phone calls, it is revealed that originally she waved at trains with her son, and when he grew up and moved away, she continued as a way to stay close to him.

On her birthday, her son Pierre comes to visit. She tells him that she has "met someone" and he reacts angrily, and then tries to convince her to move into a retirement home. Annoyed, she leaves while he's taking a phone call and races home to greet the train, but the train does not come. She wanders out onto the tracks to see if a letter or package is left and Pierre finds her there. He hugs her and gives her the pamphlet for the retirement home. She goes inside and angrily calls the railroad only to discover that the TGV has been rerouted and will no longer come by. She falls asleep in a chair, missing a knock on her door.

In the morning she discovers a letter from Bruno under the door. He writes that he is sorry he missed her, that he will miss seeing her as he passes by and that he is leaving by train from Zürich later that morning. Elise gets on her bicycle and races to meet him. Although she bikes fast enough to create a breeze, on the outside of town she realizes she will not make it to Zürich on time. She runs into Jacques who gives her a ride in his automobile. Elise, still in her nightgown, races through the train station but gets to the platform just as the doors have been closed, leaving her visibly disappointed. But Bruno, sitting in a passenger car, spots her and calls her name, banging on the window of the train. She finally sees him, but then notices his wife, sitting next to him, as the train departs. Jacques comforts her. Back in town, Elise's bakery, after a closure for remodeling, reopens to a large crowd, with Jacques hired to help. Elise reflects on the experience and realizes that it has given her renewed desire to reengage with life.

In the epilogue, video is shown of the real woman on whom the story is based.

== Cast ==
- Jane Birkin as Elise
- Julie Dray as Dance Teacher
- Nicolas Heini as Bruno's Son
- Lucien Guignard as Jacques
- Manuela Biedermann as Charlotte
- Viola von Scarpatetti as Dustlady
- Gilles Tschudi as Bruno
- Heidi Bohrer as Bruno's wife
- Mathieu Bisson as Pierre

== Awards ==
- Nominated: Academy Award for Best Live Action Short Film
- Finalist: Music + Sound Awards (International) «Best Short Film Score»
- Won: Best Live Action Short 15+ Minutes, Reel Shorts Film Festival
- Won: Swiss Film Award «Best Short Film»
