= Megan (2018 film) =

2018 American film

- Film poster
- Directed by: Greg Strasz
- Written by: Giuseppe Mercadante; Greg Strasz
- Produced by: Jean de Meuron; Giuseppe Mercadante; Olcun Tan
- Starring: Matilda Lutz
- Cinematography: Markus Förderer
- Edited by: Zimo Huang
- Music by: Iris Wallner
- Release date: July 31, 2018
- Running time: 8 minutes
- Country: United States
- Language: English

Megan is an American proof-of-concept film that pays homage to the Cloverfield franchise. It was released on YouTube on July 31, 2018 and immediately went viral.

== Synopsis ==
When a young scientist becomes entangled in a military mission to deliver the only antidote that will save mankind, she finds herself not only fighting for survival but also being confronted by demons from her past.

== Production ==
The film was produced by Jean de Meuron, Giuseppe Mercadante and Olcun Tan. Once the script was ready and with the lookbook in hand director Greg Strasz, producers Jean de Meuron and Giuseppe Mercadante pitched the idea to several leading industry vendors. Companies like RED Digital Cinema, Helinet Aviation, International Studio Services, Dolby and Gradient Effects believed in their vision and decided to support their project. The script was written by Giuseppe Mercadante and Greg Strasz on a story written by Jean de Meuron, Giuseppe Mercadante and Greg Strasz.

The film was shot in three days at RED Digital Cinema Hollywood Studios, Helinet Aviation, the Los Angeles River, and Venice Beach. The heavy VFX work was done by Gradient Effects, known for their work on Stranger Things and Thor: Ragnarok. The "ashes" that are seen following the crash scene were previously used in Stranger Things' "upside-down world".

== Reception ==
On August 1, 2018, a day after release, the proof of concept went viral, picked up originally by Bloody Disgusting, SYFY, Screen Rant, the Spanish El Mundo, Geek Tyrant, then spread to several major publications like Indie Wire, Gizmodo, the French IGN, Empire, and PopSugar.

== Accolades ==
Megan has won awards at various festivals, including the London International Short Film Festival, where the film won Best International Sci-Fi Short. Megan won a Silver Telly Award, honoring excellence in video and television across all screens since 1979, at The 40th Annual Telly Awards (Online: General-Viral).
