= Jean de Meuron =

Swiss film maker

- Jean de Meuron at the 89th Academy Awards
- Born: November 29, 1985 (age 40); Basel, Switzerland
- Education: The New School
- Occupations: Writer, Director, Producer

Jean de Meuron (born November 29, 1985) is a Swiss writer, director and producer. He is best known for writing, directing and producing Edge of Space, which gathered widespread entertainment industry recognition, received multiple awards, top honors and prizes at international film festivals, and was Shortlisted in the Best Live Action Short Film category for the 97th Academy Awards in 2024.

De Meuron and his team won a total of 6 Telly Awards, honoring excellence in video and television across all screens since 1979, for Edge of Space at The 46th Annual Telly Awards, including Gold for Craft-Directing, General-Science & Technology, Craft-Videography & Cinematography and Craft-Drone & Aerial Cinematography, as well as Silver for General-History and Craft-Use of Archival Footage. He is also known for producing the critically acclaimed La femme et le TGV that got several accolades at major film festivals around the world and was nominated for an Academy Award for Best Live Action Short Film at the 89th Academy Awards in 2017, as well as the viral Megan (2018 film) for which de Meuron won a Silver Telly Award at The 40th Telly Awards (Online: General-Viral). Before his filmmaking career, de Meuron worked for internationally renowned writer, director and producer Roland Emmerich at Centropolis Entertainment, contributing as part of the creative team to Tides (film) and Moonfall (film). In 2019, he was invited to join the Academy of Motion Picture Arts and Sciences as a member.

== Early life and education ==
De Meuron was born in Basel, Switzerland as the son of architect Pierre de Meuron, co-founder of the prestigious global firm Herzog & de Meuron. He is an alumnus of the New York Film Academy (NYFA), USC School of Cinematic Arts and UCLA Extension. In 2016, he graduated from The New School, New York with a Bachelor of Science in Liberal Arts – Film & Media Studies.

== Work ==
Acting as Manager Industry at the Zurich Film Festival in Switzerland, de Meuron is in charge of co-curating and co-organizing the Zurich Summit conference with ZFF Festival Director & Co-Owner, Reta Guetg.

== Filmography ==
Short Film

Year	Film	Functioned as			Notes	Ref.
Year	Film	Director	Producer	Writer	Notes	Ref.
2016	La femme et le TGV	No	Executive	No		
2017	The Suitcase	No	Executive	No		
2017	Blood Brothers	No	Yes	No		
2018	Megan (2018 film)	No	Yes	Story		
2018	Child of the Earth	No	Executive	No		
2019	First Contact	Yes	Yes	Yes		
2021	Atom	No	Executive	No		
2024	Edge of Space	Yes	Yes	Yes		
2026	Pigeons	No	Executive	No		

Documentary

Year	Film	Functioned as			Notes	Ref.
Year	Film	Director	Producer	Writer	Notes	Ref.
2012	CINEMAsuisse: Marc Forster	No	Associate	No		
