= Michael Woroniecki =

Christian missionary (born 1954)

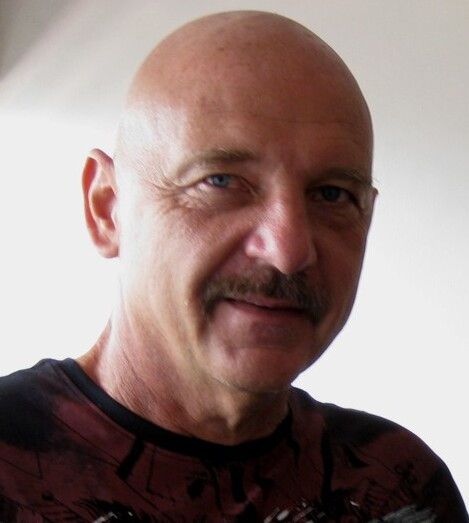
- Woroniecki in 2009
- Born: February 4, 1954 (age 72); Grand Rapids, Michigan, US
- Other names: Michael Warnecki, Warneki, Worneki, Mike War
- Education: Central Michigan University; Melodyland School of Theology; Fuller Theological Seminary; Aquinas College

Ecclesiastical career
- Church: Current: None Former: Cornerstone Christian Fellowship

Michael Peter Woroniecki (also Michael Warnecki, Warneki, Worneki, Mike War, and Mike Wazowski; born February 4, 1954) is an American evangelical street preacher who has been described as a cult leader. Woroniecki is well known for his ministry on college campuses and at various public events across the US over the span of the last 30 years.

== Early life and family ==
Woroniecki was the youngest of a large Polish Catholic family who was raised in the city of Grand Rapids, Michigan. His mother became involved in the Catholic Charismatic Movement in the early 1970s and sought to introduce her children to the born again experience. In 1972, seeking a way out of Grand Rapids, he "made a deal with God" that he would attend prayer meetings with his mother if he could make All-City tailback in football and thus receive a scholarship for college. He got the title and the scholarship.

Woroniecki attended Central Michigan University (CMU) where he studied psychology and played varsity football from 1972 to 1976. He boasted of being able to bench press 400 lbs and run a 4.5 second 40-yard dash. Woroniecki explains in his Christian testimony that he forgot his deal with God and had a "wild streak", involving himself in alcohol and partying. Woroniecki states that he was known to his teammates as the "Crazy War" and says he was arrested the summer of his freshman year for fighting in a bar, just to prove to his peers how tough he was.

During spring football practice in 1974, Woroniecki suffered a disabling football injury that threatened his athletic aspirations. About the same time, Woroniecki's mother gave him a Bible, which he began to read. Woroniecki says God used this time of suffering and depression to break him of his pride, preparing him to receive the Gospel. Woroniecki attended the annual Catholic Charismatic Conference at University of Notre Dame the weekend of June 14, 1974 with his family. He was in the stadium when he says he told God that he didn't know what the saying "born again" meant, but that he wanted everything that the Lord had for him. While sitting alone in the stadium, Woroniecki says that he gave his life to Jesus. At that moment, Woroniecki believes that he "met the living Jesus". "The grass and goalposts were the same but I was changed" says Woroniecki, adding that he found significance in the recently painted Touchdown Jesus on the library mural right in front of him.

Woroniecki returned to college football practice in July that same summer. One day after practice, while in a bar with his teammates, Woroniecki says he ordered water in the place of his usual beer. His friends becoming curious, Woroniecki explained that he had met Jesus. Used to his outrageous life-of-the-party humor, they all mistakenly thought he was joking, and Woroniecki became the focus of ridicule and rejection by his teammates. He writes that he could not understand why people like Roger Staubach, a famous Christian athlete, were respected, yet he was rejected, until he read John 12:24 and 25. He reasoned that if the world hated Jesus without cause, they would also hate and reject him if he followed him.

The same year, Woroniecki and his teammates went on to win the NCAA Division II Football Championship for the only time in Central Michigan's history. Woroniecki graduated from Central Michigan with a B.S. in Behavioral Sciences in 1976. While at CMU, Woroniecki met a cheerleader from Detroit, Michigan, Leslie Jean Ochalek (later renamed "Rachel Rebekah"). Woroniecki and Ochalek married in 1979.

== Education ==
Charles and Rose Woroniecki, Michael Woroniecki's parents, were members of the Basilica of Saint Adalbert, a Roman Catholic church in the Polish west side of Grand Rapids. Michael Woroniecki attended a Catholic grade school adjoining his family's parish and then advanced to West Catholic High School, another parochial school in Grand Rapids. During his senior year of high school in 1972, Woroniecki began attending Catholic Charismatic prayer meetings, part of his "deal with God."

After graduating from Central Michigan, Woroniecki attended Melodyland School of Theology at Anaheim, California starting in 1976. A month after returning home from seminary that summer, his mother died from colon cancer.

Woroniecki applied to the Dominican and Franciscan Orders of the Catholic Church with the intention of helping to bring reform from within the Church. In his final round of interviews with the Dominican seminary near Chicago, Illinois, Woroniecki was refused immediate admission and decided on a different course of action. He then applied to the Franciscan seminary in his own hometown of Grand Rapids. After a semester of study at Aquinas College, Woroniecki was again offered an extended preparatory period. He chose to pursue other means of study.

In 1978, Woroniecki was accepted at Fuller Theological Seminary in Pasadena, California, a non-denominational institution. Woroniecki says he was "deeply grieved" by the professionalism and business-like attitude towards the things of God at Fuller. This atmosphere, Woroniecki claims, ultimately compelled him to stand on the campus lawn and preach "the living Jesus" to fellow students and professors when they came out of the chapel. He confronted classmates over the attitudes of scholastic pride and hypocrisy that he thought to contradict the life of Jesus of Nazareth. Woroniecki obtained his Master of Divinity degree from Fuller in 1980.

Upon returning to Grand Rapids, Woroniecki briefly attended and occasionally preached at Maranatha Church. Shortly thereafter, Woroniecki left to start his own home church and street preaching ministry.

== Ministry ==
=== Preaching ===
Woroniecki returned to Grand Rapids after graduating from Fuller Seminary in the summer of 1980, where he preached on the streets and at various events while carrying a sign or cross, starting his own ministry called Cornerstone Christian Fellowship. As a result of, according to Woroniecki, "youthful zeal" and a city unsure of how to handle his unconventional evangelistic approach, Woroniecki was arrested numerous times over the next year and a half. In October 1981, he offered to leave town if the pending charges against him would be dropped. The offer was accepted and Woroniecki began to travel the US, stopping first in Atlanta, Georgia where street preaching is permitted.

To deliver his message, Woroniecki chooses college campuses, large sporting and political events as well as city centers. His wife and six adult children are often seen ministering alongside him. In the early 1990s, he shipped a Ford van to England and then ferried it to France. The family traveled together across Europe and then to Tangier, Morocco. In May 1995, they preached in Casablanca, where Muslim law makes it a crime to declare Jesus as the Son of God. A riot resulted and the family was arrested. They were interrogated for eight hours by state officials, then ordered to leave the country.

Since leaving Grand Rapids 30 years ago, Woroniecki and his family have preached in all 50 U.S. states, Latin America, Europe, Russia and Morocco.

=== Music ===
Michael Woroniecki began creating music with an electronic keyboard in 1986. In the early 1990s he began using this music as another form of ministry on the streets of Europe. During the summers of 1992 to 1996 he performed in downtown city plazas and centers in places like London, Paris, Barcelona, Lisbon, Rome, Berlin, Budapest, Athens, and Moscow. Woroniecki says he used the music along with dances and Biblical skits as a means of communicating the gospel in countries where they did not speak the language. Michael does not consider himself professional but believes "that music is a powerful tool to touch people of all walks of life".

During the 1996 Atlanta Summer Olympic Games, Woroniecki was reported to have performed with his family outside the various venues using the event to reach the international crowds with his message. Beginning in 1997, Woroniecki traveled throughout Mexico and Latin America, playing on the streets.

Woroniecki claims that, from 2006 to 2009, he has self-produced eight music CDs which he and his family have distributed in their travels.

== Religious views ==
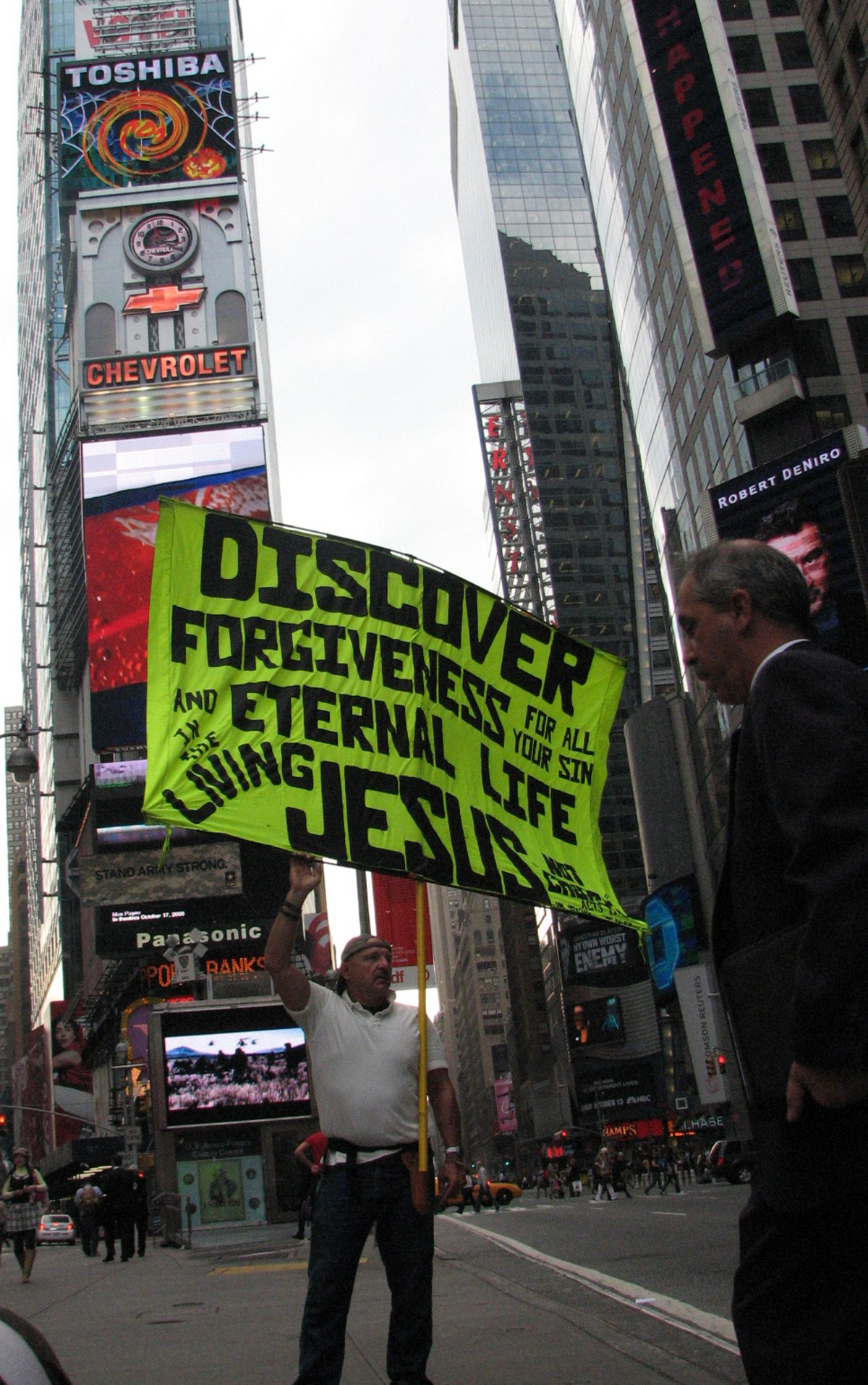
Woroniecki in Times Square, 2008.

Woroniecki preaches that one must "get alone, study the New Testament and seek the Living Jesus to be Born Again". He says that today's "churches" are not the true Church as seen in the Scriptures and cannot save anyone.

Woroniecki has used large banner signs and often a wooden cross to convey his message for the past 35 years. In his ministry Woroniecki addresses the Biblical themes of hypocrisy in the institutional system, grace, salvation, forgiveness, hell, judgment, deception and the consequences of sin. Because of this, Woroniecki has taken his share of verbal and physical opposition. He claims that these are the "last days" and that Jesus will soon return to judge the world. Woroniecki cites various Scripture verses in his pamphlets to substantiate his message that only by faith can a man be saved from hell and reconciled to God, a doctrine accepted by most mainstream Christians and defined by Martin Luther as sola fide.

The Bible figures strongly in Woroniecki's beliefs and is a focal point of his preaching. Despite not holding a conventional position in an established religion, Woroniecki's knowledge of Scripture and theology is extensive. His years of personal and scholastic study at three seminaries are reflected in his writings. Woroniecki believes in Biblical inerrancy and considers the Scriptures authoritative on all matters of life.

Woroniecki's message is met on the streets with a variety of responses.

== Andrea Yates ==
Woroniecki first met Rusty Yates in the mid-1980s while preaching on the campus of Auburn University. Rusty took some literature, and they corresponded by mail for the next several years. In 1989 Rusty introduced the Woronieckis to Andrea Kennedy, whom he had recently begun dating. Woroniecki said of this meeting that Andrea seemed slightly intimidated, and that he advised them not to marry quickly, the same advice he gave to other young couples.

The Yates and Woroniecki families stayed in touch by letter and telephone, and in 1998, the Yates family traveled to Miami after hearing that the Woronieckis were selling their motor home. Rusty bought the bus, a 1978 GMC that Woroniecki had used for his family's travels. During the week that the Yates stayed, Woroniecki confronted Rusty, saying that he was "willing to sacrifice his wife and children for the sake of his job". After this confrontation, Rusty and Woroniecki "grew apart". In the months leading up to the drownings, Rusty described the relationship with the Woronieckis as not being very close.

Andrea Yates had suffered mental health difficulties for several years leading up to 2001. In June 1999 Andrea took an overdose of sedatives and was hospitalized several times over the next two years. She was prescribed a variety of antidepressant and antipsychotic medications. On June 20, 2001, a few weeks after being discharged from Devereaux Texas Treatment Center, Andrea killed all five of her children.

In early 2002 Michael Woroniecki came to the attention of the national media when Yates's trial started. Yates's defense attorney, George Parnham, placed a copy of Woroniecki's newsletter The Perilous Times into evidence, suggesting that the material was dangerous for someone like Yates, and defense team psychiatrist Lucy Puryear said on Good Morning America that "Yates's fate may have been different if she never met Woroniecki". Certain media outlets alleged that Woroniecki bore some responsibility for influencing Andrea.

However, both Michael Woroniecki and Rusty Yates dismissed the allegations. According to the Houston Chronicle, "[Russell] Yates said his relationship with Woroniecki was more like learning from a book. He was free to accept what he wanted and reject that which he didn't". Yates said "That's just crazy" when asked whether or not his wife was influenced by Woroniecki. He stated that Andrea had suffered schizophrenia, depression and delusions for years. Both Yates and Woroniecki characterized the connection between Woroniecki's teachings and Andrea Yates's state of mind as nothing more than sensationalist reporting. Woroniecki "... certainly didn't cause the delusion," says Yates.

Woroniecki called the defense's claims "ridiculous". He stated that he had only met Andrea personally four or five times over 20 years and that his relationship with her was "one of nothing but love and compassion". Woroniecki said that he had warned Russell Yates that Andrea and their children needed his love. Peter Jennings of World News Tonight reported that Rachel Woroniecki wrote to Rusty and Andrea that they needed to reconcile their marriage. In an interview with Dateline NBC in March 2002, Mrs. Woroniecki said:

"A major problem is that people think that by emulating our lifestyle they can have the joy and the love that we have without building a foundation in Jesus Christ."

Woroniecki was quoted by the Grand Rapids Press as saying,

"I will gladly sacrifice my reputation if it can spare Andrea from the death penalty and give her a second chance at life. However ... it is deceitful and irresponsible to blame doctors, hospitals, clinics or 'postpartum depression.' They (Rusty and Andrea Yates) both know that the issues which culminated in this tragedy are much, much deeper."

== Currently ==
Woroniecki and family members carried signs and preached outside both the Democratic National Convention in Denver and the Republican National Convention in Saint Paul in 2008.

In November 2010, Woroniecki and his family were seen ministering in Times Square in New York City, promoting their website www.ifanyoneisthirsty.com. The author writes that the primary point of their message was "that Jesus is alive and that we need to actively seek him out", adding that despite any controversy, the family seemed to him to be genuine in their efforts to "go all over the world and celebrate life and the living Jesus."

Jack Wellman, Christian evangelist, author and regular contributor to OVI Magazine and Yahoo! Voices, confirms that Woroniecki continues to take his message "to the world and the streets of the nations". Woroniecki's current message, according to Wellman, taken from Woroniecki's website and literature, is:

"Are you willing to look deeper, beyond it all? Please give us a chance to help you. It will be well worth your time. What we offer you is not a new group, "church", formulas, self exaltation or doctrines. What we offer you is the love of the living Jesus who has the answers that you are looking for".

Woroniecki and his family currently run a 501(c)3 organization called Deep Heart, which is the organization they often tour under.

Woroniecki remains active in his ministry and has recently visited various universities during the fall semesters.
