= Giacun Caduff =

Swiss director and producer

Giacun Caduff (born 1979) is a Swiss director and producer. Best known for his work on La femme et le TGV as producer, which earned him critical appraisal and recognition including Academy Award for Best Live Action Short Film at the 89th Academy Awards in 2017 with director Timo von Gunten.

== Early life and education ==
He was born in Gempen, Solothurn in 1979. Having made several short movies in school, he moved to Los Angeles in the United States in 2001 to study film at the UCLA School of Theater, Film and Television from which he earned a M.A. in creative producing in 2008. His graduation film Etienne!, played at several film festivals.

== Professional career ==
After having returned to Switzerland, he founded the Gässli Film Festival in Basel in 2009, which he led until 2020. In 2014 he directed the feature film 20 rules for Sylvie. In 2016 he produced the movie La femme et le TGV for which he was nominated to the academy awards in 2017. In June 2017, he was nominated to become one of the jurors for the Oscar nominations.

== Filmography ==
- 2016: La femme et le TGV (short)
- 2016: Three Explanations for a Body in the Rhine (Short) (co-producer) (post-production)
- 2015: 20 rules for Sylvie
- 2015: Little Mountain Boy (additional second ad)
- 2013: Not So Young (first assistant director)
- 2013: Die schwarzen Brüder (additional second ad: additional)
- 2012: Someone Like Me (second assistant director)
- 2011: Salad Days (producer)
- 2009: AmerAsian (first assistant director)
- 2006: Things You Don't Tell... (first assistant director)
- 2006: Orizuru (Short) (first assistant director)
- 2009: Etienne! (producer)
- 2005: 2B or Not 2B (Short) (producer)
- 2003: The Jazz Addict (Short) (first assistant director)

== Awards ==
- 2017: Nominated to the Academy Award for Best Live Action Short Film
- 2015: Solothurn Prize for Culture Furtherance
