= Edge of Space =

2024 Short Film

- Film Poster
- Directed by: Jean de Meuron
- Screenplay by: Jean de Meuron
- Produced by: Jean de Meuron; Nicolas Emiliani; Elena Bawiec
- Cinematography: Daryl Hefti
- Edited by: Chris Witt
- Music by: Mark Baechle
- Release date: July 26, 2024 (LA Shorts)
- Running time: 18 minutes
- Countries: Switzerland; United States
- Language: English

Edge of Space is a 2024 Swiss-American short film written, directed and produced by Jean de Meuron. Inspired by actual historical events, the 18 minutes short film about a USAF Test Pilot recruited by NASA was among the 15 Shortlisted films in the Best Live Action Short Film category for the 97th Academy Awards. De Meuron and his team won a total of 6 Telly Awards, honoring excellence in video and television across all screens since 1979, for Edge of Space at The 46th Annual Telly Awards, including Gold for Craft-Directing, General-Science & Technology, Craft-Videography & Cinematography and Craft-Drone & Aerial Cinematography, as well as Silver for General-History and Craft-Use of Archival Footage.

== Summary ==
Set in 1961, during the height of the US-Soviet space race, an ambitious USAF test pilot is recruited by NASA for a daring suborbital mission in an X-15 hypersonic rocket-powered aircraft with astronomical implications.

== Cast ==
- Chad Michael Collins as Glen Ford
- Kimberly Alexander as Chloé Ford
- Freedom Bridgewater as United States Air Force Colonel
- Gregory Gast as NASA Official
- Jackson Robert Scott as Young Glen Ford
- Justin Taite as Howard Ford
- Kevin LaRosa II as Tom Mitchell
- Nathalia Ramos as Emily Mitchell
- Marcus Eley as Funeral Priest
- David Schroeder as Diner Customer

== Release ==
The film had its world premiere in July 2024 at the Oscar® and BAFTA qualifying LA Shorts Fest, where it won Jury Special Mention. In August 2024, the film screened at the Oscar® and BAFTA qualifying HollyShorts Film Festival, where it was nominated for Best VFX.

== Accolades ==
Award	Year	Category	Result	Ref.
LA Shorts Fest	2024	Jury Special Mention	Won	
HollyShorts Film Festival	2024	Best VFX	Nominated	
